= List of Beijing landmarks =

There are many landmarks in Beijing. The best-known ones include the Badaling stretch of the Great Wall of China, the Temple of Heaven, the Tian'anmen and the Forbidden City, a number of temples, hutongs and parks, relics of ages gone by.

== Buildings, monuments and landmarks ==
- Baliqiao (Eight Li Bridge)
- Beijing Ancient Observatory
- Beijing National Stadium
- Bell Tower and Drum Tower
- Forbidden City (World Heritage Site)
- Guozijian (Imperial College)
- Haotian Pagoda
- Historic hutongs and siheyuans in many older neighborhoods
- Huguang Guild Hall
- Liulichang
- Marco Polo Bridge and the Wanping Fortress
- Ming tombs (World Heritage Site)
- Old Summer Palace
- Pagoda of Cishou Temple
- Pagoda of Tianning Temple
- Peking Man Site at Zhoukoudian (World Heritage Site)
- Prince Chun Mansion
- Prince Gong Mansion
- Summer Palace (World Heritage Site)
- Tiananmen Square
  - Great Hall of the People
  - Mausoleum of Mao Zedong
  - Monument to the People's Heroes
  - National Centre for the Performing Arts
  - National Museum of China
  - Tiananmen (Gate of Heavenly Peace)
  - Zhengyangmen
- Tuancheng Fortress
- Zhengyici Peking Opera Theatre

== Temples, churches and mosques ==
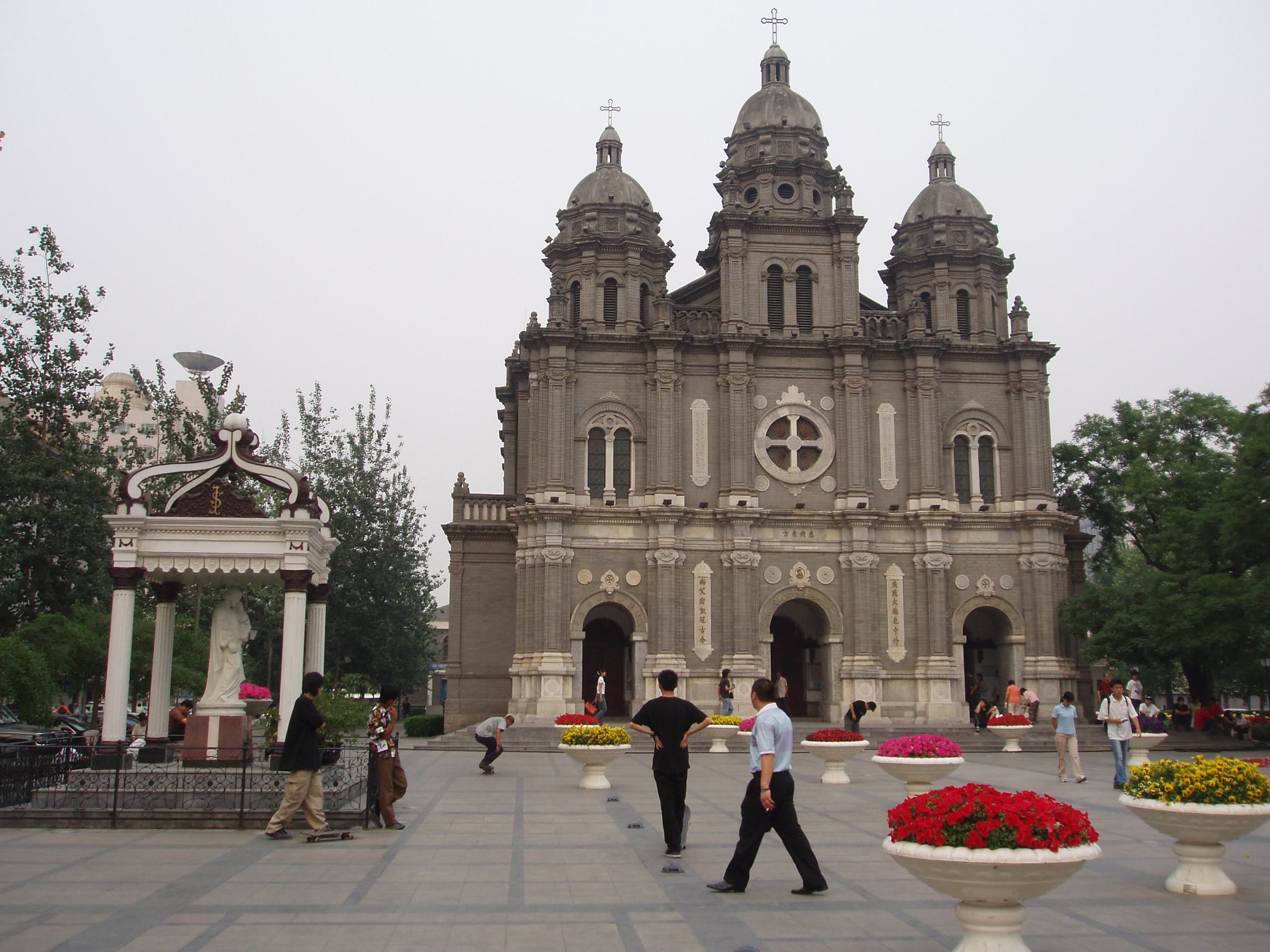
St. Joseph's Church, Beijing

- Altar of Earth and Harvests
- Badachu
- Bailin Temple
- Big Bell Temple
- Cathedral of the Immaculate Conception
- Chanfu Temple
- Changchun Temple
- Cheng'en Temple
- Confucius Temple
- Dahui Temple
- Dajue Temple
- Dongyue Temple
- Fahai Temple
- Fayuan Temple
- Guanghua Temple
- Guangji Temple
- Hongluo Temple
- Imperial Ancestral Temple
- Jietai Temple
- Miaoying Temple
- Niujie Mosque
- Temple of Azure Clouds
- Temple of Earth
- Temple of Heaven (World Heritage Site)
- Temple of Moon
- Temple of the Sun
- Xiancantan
- Tanzhe Temple
- Temple of Agriculture
- Wangfujing Church
- Wanshou Temple
- White Cloud Temple
- Wofo Temple
- Xishiku Church
- Church of Our Lady of Mount Carmel, Beijing
- Yonghegong
- Yunju Temple
- Zhenjue Temple
- Zhihua Temple

== Museums ==
- Beijing Art Museum
- Beijing Exhibition Center
- Beijing Liao and Jin City Wall Museum
- Beijing Museum of Natural History
- Beijing Planning Exhibition Hall
- Capital Museum
- China Railway Museum
- Chinese Aviation Museum
- Dabaotai Western Han Dynasty Mausoleum
- Geological Museum of China
- Madame Tussauds Beijing
- Military Museum of the Chinese People's Revolution
- National Art Museum of China
- National Museum of China
- Palace Museum
- Paleozoological Museum of China
- Western Zhou Yan State Capital Museum
- Yuan Center

== Parks and gardens ==
- Beihai Park
- Beijing Botanical Garden
- Chaoyang Park
- Ditan Park
- Fragrant Hills
- Grandview Garden
- Haidian Park
- Honglingjin Park
- Jingshan Park
- Longtan Park
- Milu Yuan
- Ming City Wall Relics Park
- Olympic Green
- Purple Bamboo Park
- Qingnianhu Park
- Ritan Park
- Shichahai
- Taoranting Park
- Tiantan Park
- World Park
- Wuzuolou Forest Park
- Yuetan Park
- Zhongshan Park
- Yuyuantan Park

== Shopping and commercial districts ==
- 798 Art Zone
- Beijing central business district
- Beijing Financial Street
- Silk Street
- Wangfujing
- Xidan
- Yizhuang
- Zhongguancun

== See also ==
- List of hutongs in Beijing
- List of pagodas in Beijing
- Major national historical and cultural sites in Beijing
- Tourism in China
