= List of Major National Historical and Cultural Sites in Beijing =

This list is of Major Sites Protected for their Historical and Cultural Value at the National Level in the Municipality of Beijing.

Site	Chinese name	Location	Designation	Image
Red Building of Peking University	北京大学红楼	Beijing; 39°59′23″N 116°18′19″E	1-8	Upload file
Lugou Bridge	卢沟桥	Beijing	1-24	Upload file
Tiananmen	天安门	Beijing; 39°54′26″N 116°23′28″E	1-30	Upload file
Monument to the People's Heroes	人民英雄纪念碑	Beijing; 39°54′11″N 116°23′30″E	1-33	Upload file
Pagoda and Stone-carved Sutras at Yunju Temple	房山云居寺塔及石经	Beijing; 39°36′29″N 115°46′04″E	1-66	Upload file
Temple of the White Pagoda	妙应寺白塔	Beijing; 39°55′26″N 116°21′25″E	1-74	Upload file
Diamond Throne Pagoda at Zhenjue Temple	真觉寺金刚宝座	Beijing; 39°56′37″N 116°19′27″E	1-75	Upload file
Cloud Platform at Juyongguan	居庸关云台	Beijing; 40°17′20″N 116°04′05″E	1-98	Upload file
Forbidden City	故宫	Beijing; 39°54′53″N 116°23′26″E	1-100	Upload file
Great Wall at Badaling	万里长城—八达岭	Yanqing County, Beijing; 40°21′15″N 116°00′25″E	1-101	Upload file
Temple of Heaven	天坛	Beijing; 39°52′56″N 116°24′23″E	1-105	Upload file
Beihai Park and Round City	北海及团城	Beijing; 39°55′28″N 116°22′59″E	1-106	Upload file
Zhihua Temple	智化寺	Beijing; 39°54′58″N 116°25′33″E	1-110	Upload file
Guozijian	北京国子监	Beijing; 39°56′46″N 116°24′48″E	1-113	Upload file
Yonghe Temple	雍和宫	Beijing; 39°56′49″N 116°24′40″E	1-114	Upload file
Summer Palace	颐和园	Beijing; 39°59′51″N 116°16′08″E	1-122	Upload file
Zhoukoudian	周口店遗址	Beijing; 39°41′21″N 115°55′26″E	1-136	Upload file
Ming Dynasty Tombs	十三陵	Beijing; 40°15′12″N 116°13′03″E	1-178	Upload file
Former Peking Residence of Soong Ching-ling	北京宋庆龄故居	Beijing	2-9	Upload file
Huangshicheng (Imperial Archives)	皇史宬	Beijing	2-29	Upload file
Beijing Ancient Observatory	北京古观象台	Beijing; 39°54′22″N 116°25′41″E	2-32	Upload file
Southeast corner of Beijing city fortifications	北京城东南角楼	Beijing; 39°53′55″N 116°21′04″E	2-35	Upload file
Prince Gong Residence and Garden	恭王府及花园	Beijing; 39°56′12″N 116°22′46″E	2-40	Upload file
Former Residence of Guo Moruo	郭沫若故居	Beijing	3-40	Upload file
Zhengyangmen	正阳门	Beijing; 39°53′57″N 116°23′29″E	3-63	Upload file
Imperial Ancestral Temple	太庙	Beijing; 39°54′36″N 116°23′37″E	3-80	Upload file
Beijing Shejitan	北京社稷坛	Beijing; 39°54′38″N 116°23′19″E	3-81	Upload file
Beijing Temple of Confucius	北京孔庙	Beijing; 39°56′43″N 116°24′30″E	3-82	Upload file
Residence of Chongli	崇礼住宅	Beijing	3-91	Upload file
Fahai Temple	法海寺	Beijing; 39°56′24″N 116°09′12″E	3-119	Upload file
Niujie Mosque	牛街礼拜寺	Beijing; 39°53′04″N 116°21′29″E	3-134	Upload file
Pagoda of Tianning Temple	北京天宁寺塔	Beijing; 39°53′37″N 116°20′24″E	3-150	Upload file
Yinshan Forest of Pagodas	银山塔林	Beijing	3-153	Upload file
Liulihe Site	琉璃河遗址	Beijing	3-201	Upload file
Old Summer Palace	圆明园遗址	Beijing; 40°00′26″N 116°17′33″E	3-221	Upload file
Jietai Temple	戒台寺	Beijing; 39°52′08″N 116°04′48″E	4-94	Upload file
Beijing Dongyue Temple	北京东岳庙	Beijing; 39°55′25″N 116°26′16″E	4-113	Upload file
Dagaoxuandian	大高玄殿	Beijing	4-128	Upload file
Lidai Diwang Temple	历代帝王庙	Beijing	4-129	Upload file
Beijing Drum Tower and Bell Tower	北京鼓楼、 钟楼	Beijing; 39°56′25″N 116°23′23″E	4-130	Upload file
Cathedral of the Immaculate Conception in Beijing (Nantang)	南堂	Beijing	4-165	Upload file
Big Bell Temple	觉生寺	Beijing; 39°58′05″N 116°19′55″E	4-166	Upload file
Site of a Jin Dynasty Water Gate	金中都水关遗址	Beijing; 39°51′41″N 116°21′10″E	5-1	Upload file
Jingtai Mausoleum	景泰陵	Beijing	5-145	Upload file
Tanzhe Temple	潭柘寺	Beijing; 39°54′14″N 116°01′27″E	5-195	Upload file
Beijing Keyuan	北京可园	Beijing	5-196	Upload file
Residence of Prince Fu	孚王府	Beijing	5-197	Upload file
Jingshan Park	景山	Beijing; 39°55′25″N 116°23′26″E	5-198	Upload file
White Cloud Temple	北京白云观	Beijing; 39°53′56″N 116°20′17″E	5-199	Upload file
Ten Thousand Buddha Hall, Stone Carvings and Pagoda at Kong Shui Cave	万佛堂、孔水洞石刻及塔	Beijing	5-200	Upload file
Fayuan Temple	法源寺	Beijing; 39°53′02″N 116°21′49″E	5-201	Upload file
Temple of Agriculture	先农坛	Beijing; 39°52′36″N 116°23′10″E	5-202	Upload file
Temple of Azure Clouds	碧云寺	Beijing; 39°59′45″N 116°11′07″E	5-203	Upload file
Dahui Temple	大慧寺	Beijing; 39°57′06″N 116°19′24″E	5-204	Upload file
Wofo Temple	十方普觉寺	Beijing; 40°00′19″N 116°12′04″E	5-205	Upload file
Qingjing Huacheng Pagoda	清净化城塔	Beijing	5-206	Upload file
Great Wall at Simatai	长城—万里长城—司马台	Miyun County, Beijing; 40°38′57″N 117°24′43″E	5-442(5)	Upload file
Buildings of the Beijing Legation Quarter	东交民巷使馆建筑群	Beijing; 39°54′11″N 116°24′06″E	5-474	Upload file
Architecture in the Garden of Yan at Weiming Lake	未名湖燕园建筑	Beijing	5-475	Upload file
Early Buildings of Tsinghua University	清华大学早期建筑	Beijing; 40°00′00″N 116°19′36″E	5-476	Upload file
Walls of Yuan Capital Dadu	元大都城墙遗址	Beijing	6-1	Upload file
Site of the Cross Temple	十字寺遗址	Beijing	6-2	Upload file
Jin Tombs	金陵	Beijing	6-221	Upload file
Tombs of Matteo Ricci and Other Foreign Missionaries	利玛窦和外国传教士墓地	Beijing	6-222	Upload file
Grave and Ancestral Temple of Yuan Chonghuan	袁崇焕墓和祠	Beijing	6-223	Upload file
Cheng'en Temple	承恩寺	Beijing; 39°56′05″N 116°09′31″E	6-298	Upload file
Temple of Earth	地坛	Beijing; 39°57′05″N 116°24′36″E	6-299	Upload file
Deshengmen Watchtower	德胜门箭楼	Beijing; 39°56′55″N 116°22′23″E	6-300	Upload file
Temple of the Moon	月坛	Beijing; 39°54′57″N 116°20′46″E	6-301	Upload file
Zhongnanhai	中南海	Beijing; 39°54′41″N 116°22′50″E	6-302	Upload file
Dajue Temple	大觉寺	Beijing; 40°03′05″N 116°05′58″E	6-303	Upload file
Temple of the Sun	日坛	Beijing; 39°54′52″N 116°26′17″E	6-304	Upload file
Jingming Garden	静明园	Beijing	6-305	Upload file
Training Camp of the Jianrui Battalions	健锐营演武厅	Beijing; 39°59′07″N 116°12′14″E	6-306	Upload file
Wanshou Temple	万寿寺	Beijing; 39°56′45″N 116°18′19″E	6-307	Upload file
Guanyue Temple	关岳庙	Beijing	6-308	Upload file
Prince Chun Mansion	醇亲王府	Beijing	6-309	Upload file
Guangji Temple	广济寺	Beijing; 39°55′25″N 116°21′58″E	6-310	Upload file
Bailin Temple	柏林寺	Beijing; 39°56′41″N 116°24′49″E	6-311	Upload file
Old Architecture of the Village of Cuandixia	爨底下村古建筑群	Beijing; 39°59′49″N 115°38′18″E	6-312	Upload file
Anhui Huiguan	安徽会馆	Beijing	6-313	Upload file
Baoguo Temple	报国寺	Beijing	6-314	Upload file
Grand Canal	京杭大运河	Beijing; 30°15′41″N 120°13′26″E	6-810	Upload file
Former Metropolitan University Site	京师大学堂分科大学旧址	Beijing	6-874	Upload file
Former Army and Navy Headquarters of the Qing Dynasty	清陆军部和海军部旧址	Beijing	6-875	Upload file
Beijing Chongwenmen Christian Church	亚斯立堂	Beijing	6-876	Upload file
Beijing Zoo	清农事试验场旧址	Beijing; 39°56′19″N 116°20′00″E	6-877	Upload file
Xishiku Cathedral	西什库教堂	Beijing	6-878	Upload file
Former National Institute of Mongolia and Tibet Site	国立蒙藏学校旧址	Beijing; 39°56′54″N 116°19′03″E	6-879	Upload file
Former Beijing National Assembly Building	北京国会旧址	Beijing	6-880	Upload file
Former Imperial Women School Site	京师女子师范学堂旧址	Beijing	6-881	Upload file
Former Site of the Printing House of the Finance Ministry	国民政府财政部印刷局旧址	Beijing	6-882	Upload file
Buildings of the Dazhalan Business Street	大栅栏商业建筑	Beijing	6-883	Upload file
Peking Union Medical College	北京协和医学院 (协和医学院旧址)	Beijing	6-884	Upload file
Old Peking Library	北平图书馆旧址	Beijing; 39°56′45″N 116°19′21″E	6-885	Upload file
Memorial to the Luanzhou Uprising	辛亥滦州起义纪念园	Beijing	6-886	Upload file
Residence of Sun Yat-sen	孙中山行馆	Beijing	6-887	Upload file
Former Residence of Lu Xun	北京鲁迅旧居	Beijing	6-888	Upload file

As well as sites protected at the national level there are 326 sites in Beijing that are under municipal protection (see zh or de).

== See also ==
- Principles for the Conservation of Heritage Sites in China
