= Forbidden City Concert Hall =

Concert hall in Beijing, China

Coordinates: 39.9109°N 116.3957°E

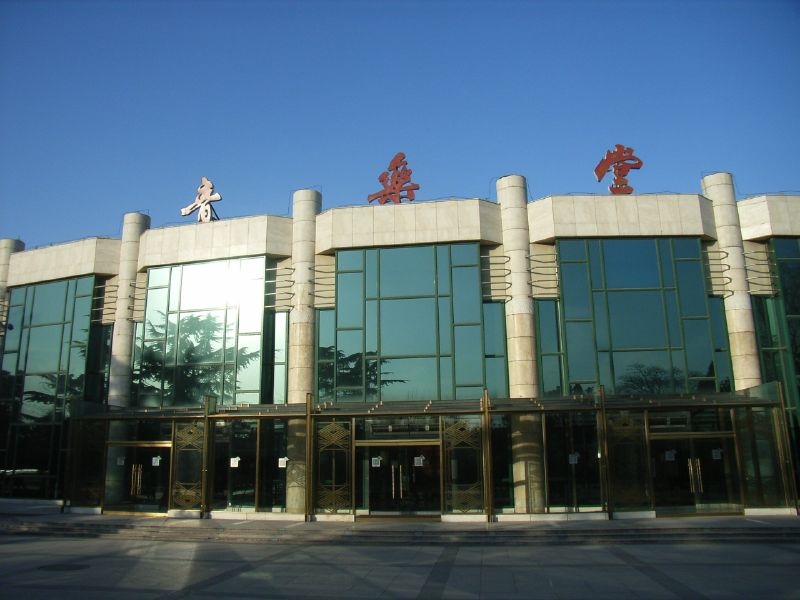
The Forbidden City Concert Hall

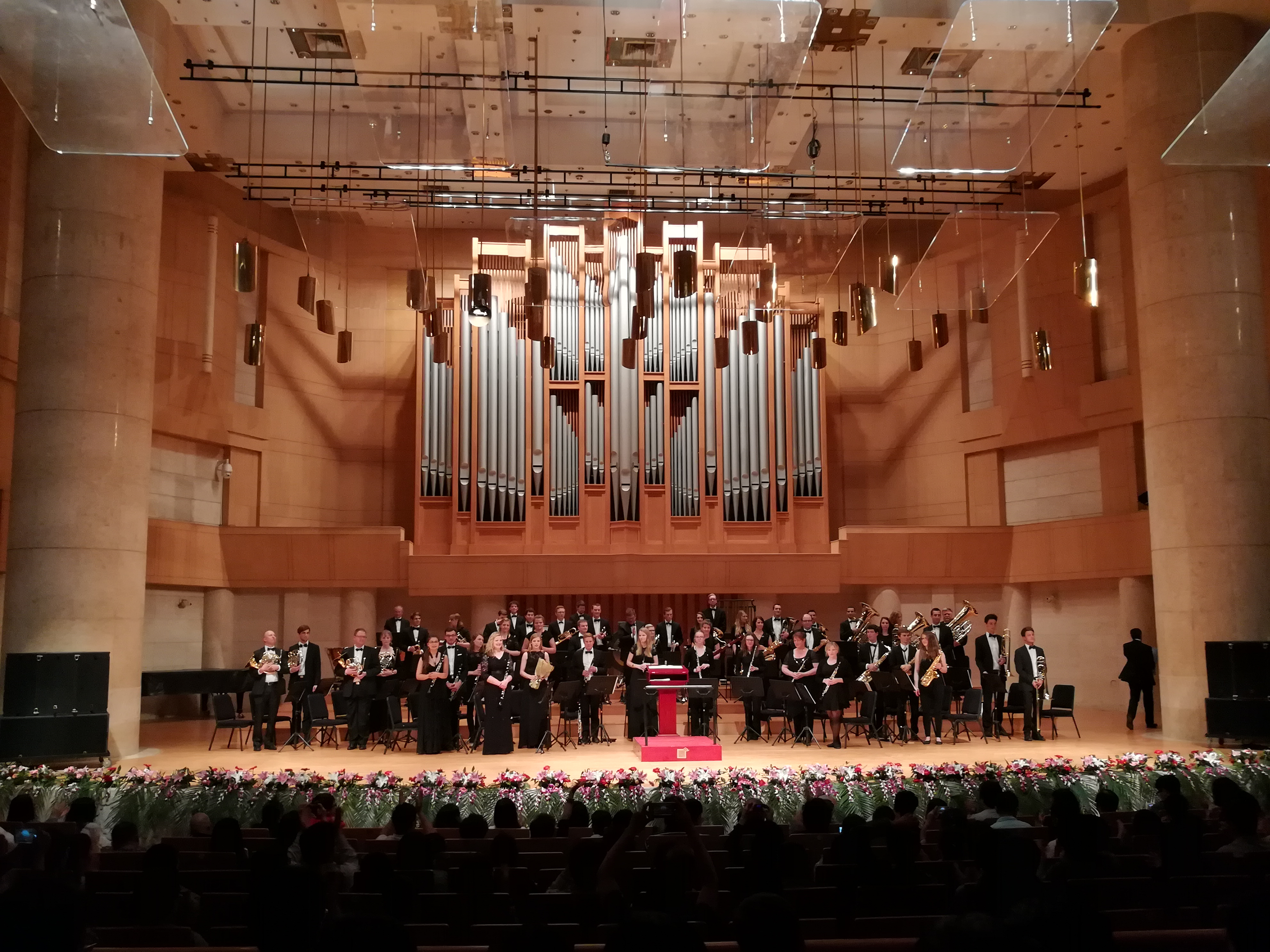
Interior

Forbidden City Concert Hall (Chinese: 中山公园音乐堂; lit. 'Zhongshan Park Music Hall') is a 1,419-seat multi-purpose venue in Beijing. The name of the venue came from the fact that it is located within the grounds of the Beijing Zhongshan Park, a vast former imperial altar Shejitan and now a public park located to the southwest of the Forbidden City and in the Imperial City.

Aside from its acoustics, the Concert Hall is well known for the romantic setting of its environment, as it is situated inside one of Beijing's most beautiful parks and is surrounded by historic gardens and landmarks.
