= Tuancheng =

Tuancheng, literally "Circular Wall", "Round Fort", or "Round City", may refer to:

- Tuancheng Fortress (Chinese: t 團城演武廳, s 团城演武厅, p Tuánchéng Yǎnwǔtīng) in Beijing, China
- Tuancheng Island (t 團城島, s 团城岛, p Tuánchéngdǎo) in Kunming Lake at the Summer Palace in Beijing, China
- Round City (t 團城, s 团城, p Tuánchéng), a former island in Beihai Park in Beijing, China
- Tuancheng Township (t 團城鄉, s 团城乡, p Tuánchéngxiāng) in Lushan County near Pindingshan, Henan, in China
