= Imperial City, Beijing =

Section of Beijing in the Ming and Qing dynasties

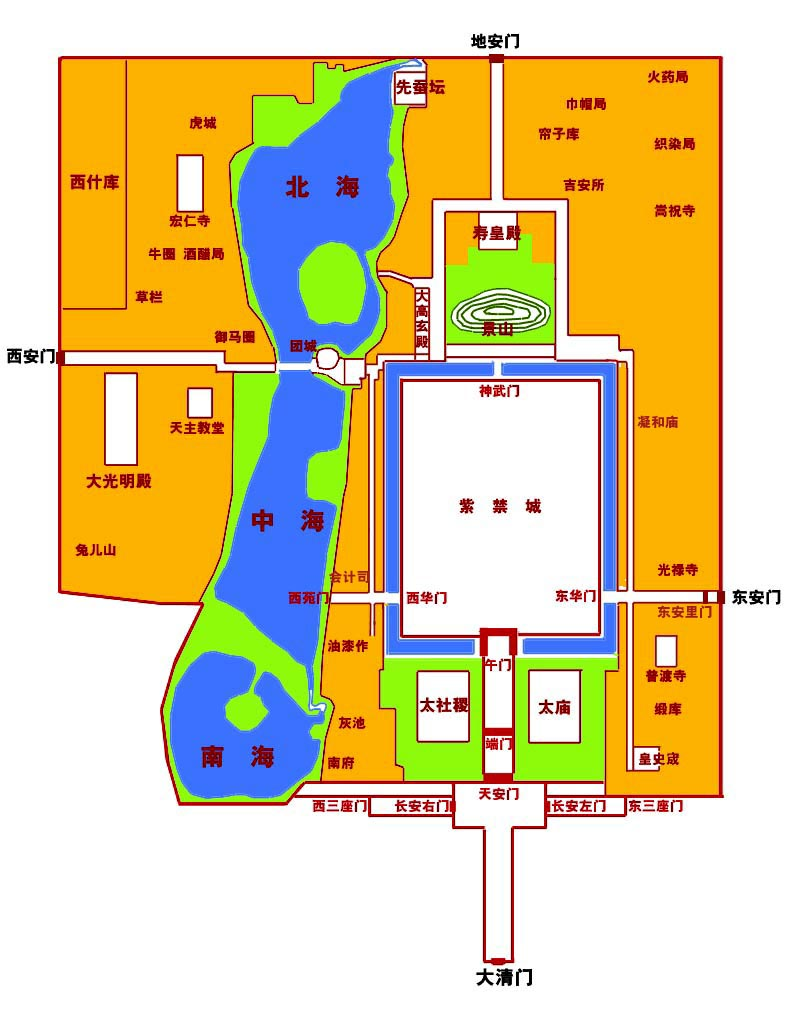
Outline of Beijing's Imperial City. The large white space on the right is the Forbidden City.

The Imperial City (Chinese: 北京皇城; pinyin: Běijīng Huángchéng; lit. 'Beijing Imperial City') is a section of the city of Beijing in the Ming and Qing dynasties, with the Forbidden City at its center. It refers to the collection of gardens, shrines, and other service areas between the Forbidden City and the Inner City of ancient Beijing. The Imperial City was surrounded by a wall and accessed through seven gates and it includes historical places such as the Forbidden City, Tiananmen, Zhongnanhai, Beihai Park, Zhongshan Park, Jingshan, Imperial Ancestral Temple, and Xiancantan.

== Construction ==
Location of the Imperial City within the walled city of Beijing in the Qing dynasty.

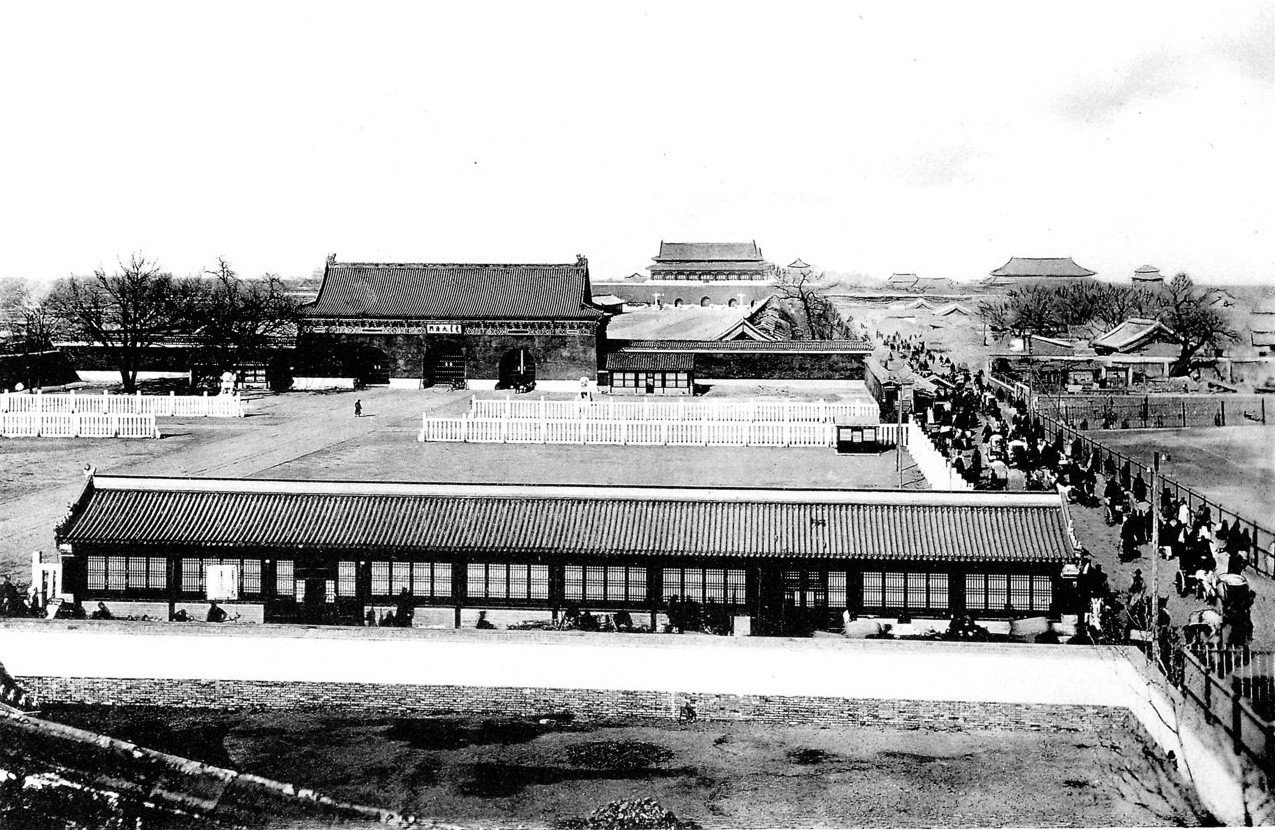
The Gate of China, formerly the formal gateway to the Imperial City. This view is from the Zhengyangmen. Behind the Gate of China is Tiananmen and the Forbidden City.

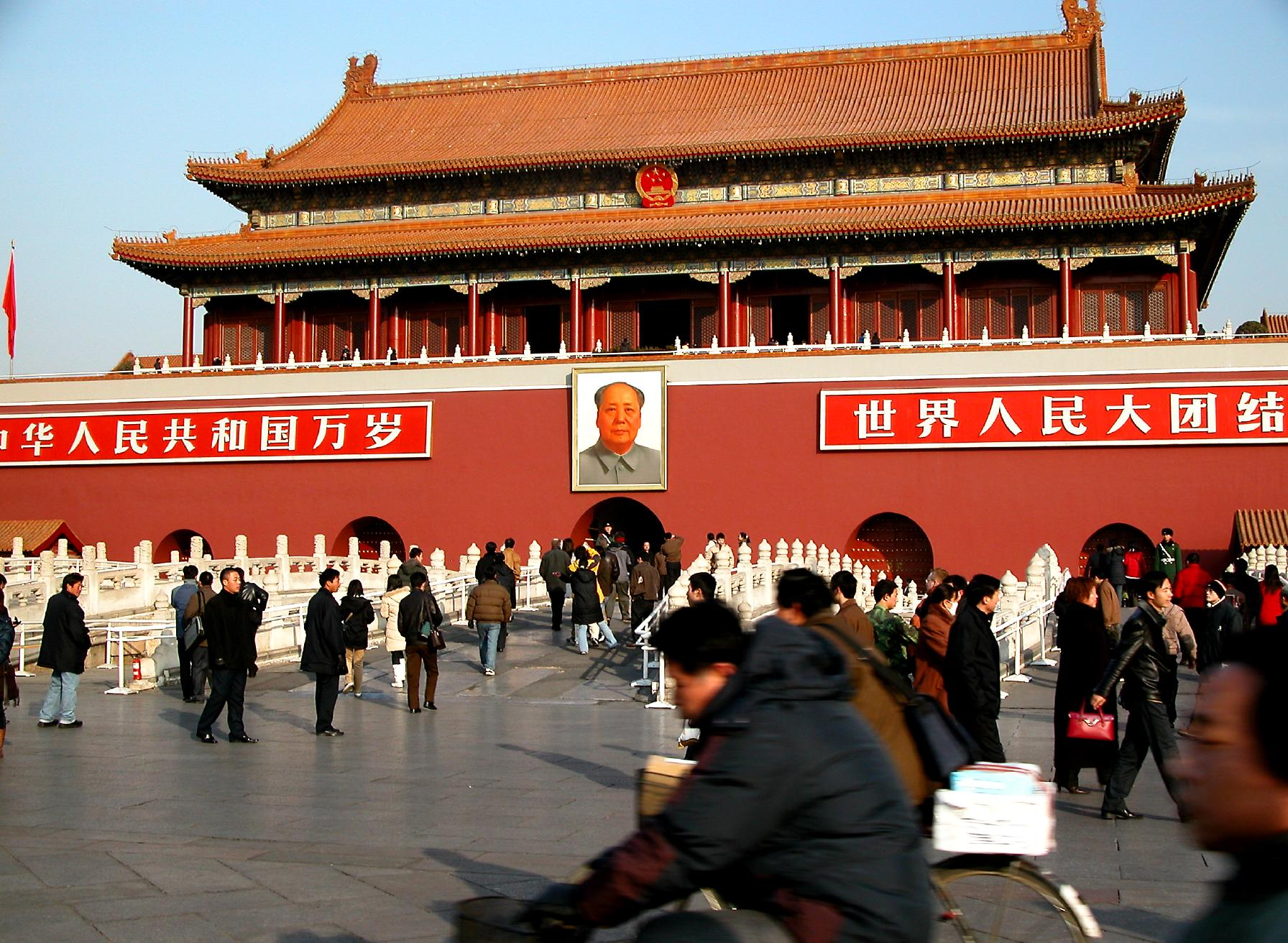
Tiananmen, the southern gate of the Imperial City

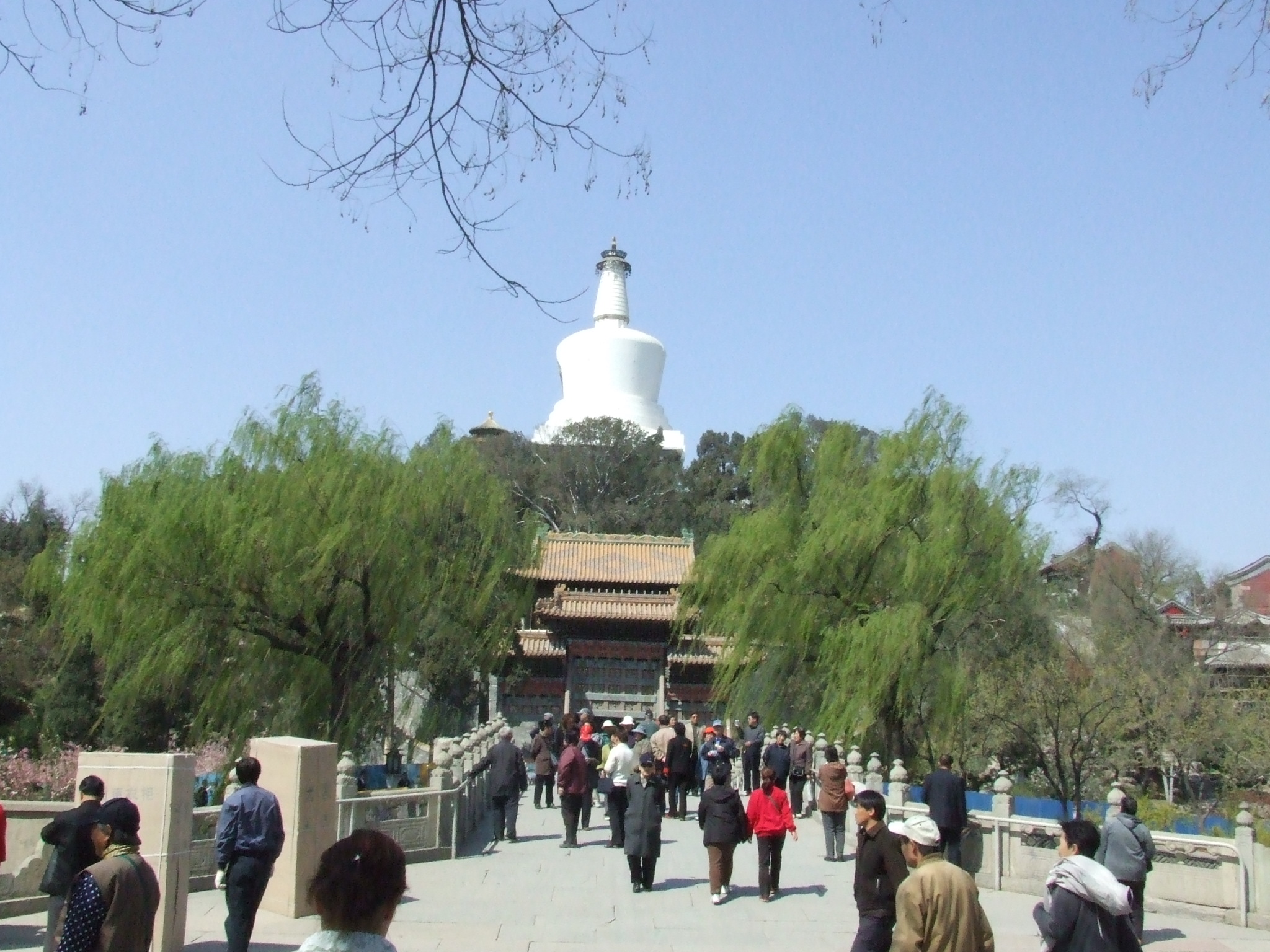
The Beihai Park, a former imperial garden centred on one of the lakes which cover most of the western part of the former Imperial City.

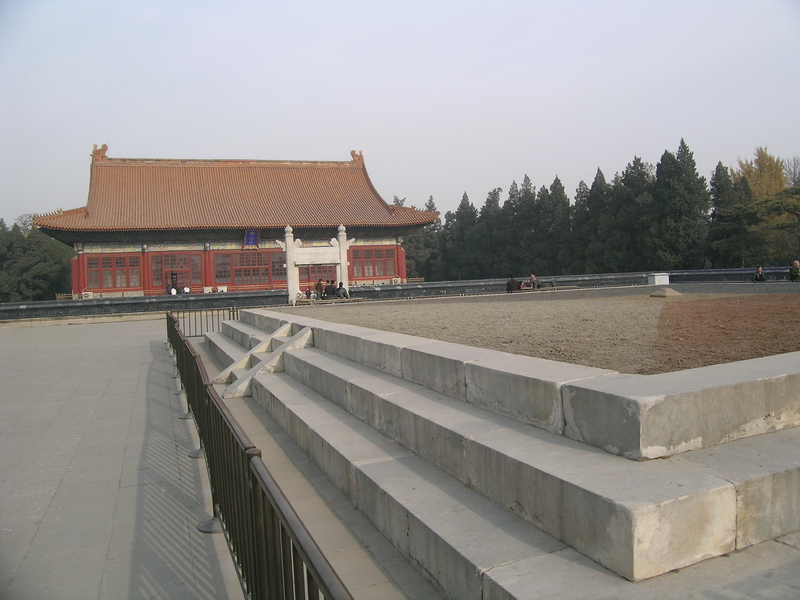
The Altar of Earth and Harvests in the Imperial City, built in 1421. The altar compound is now Zhongshan Park.

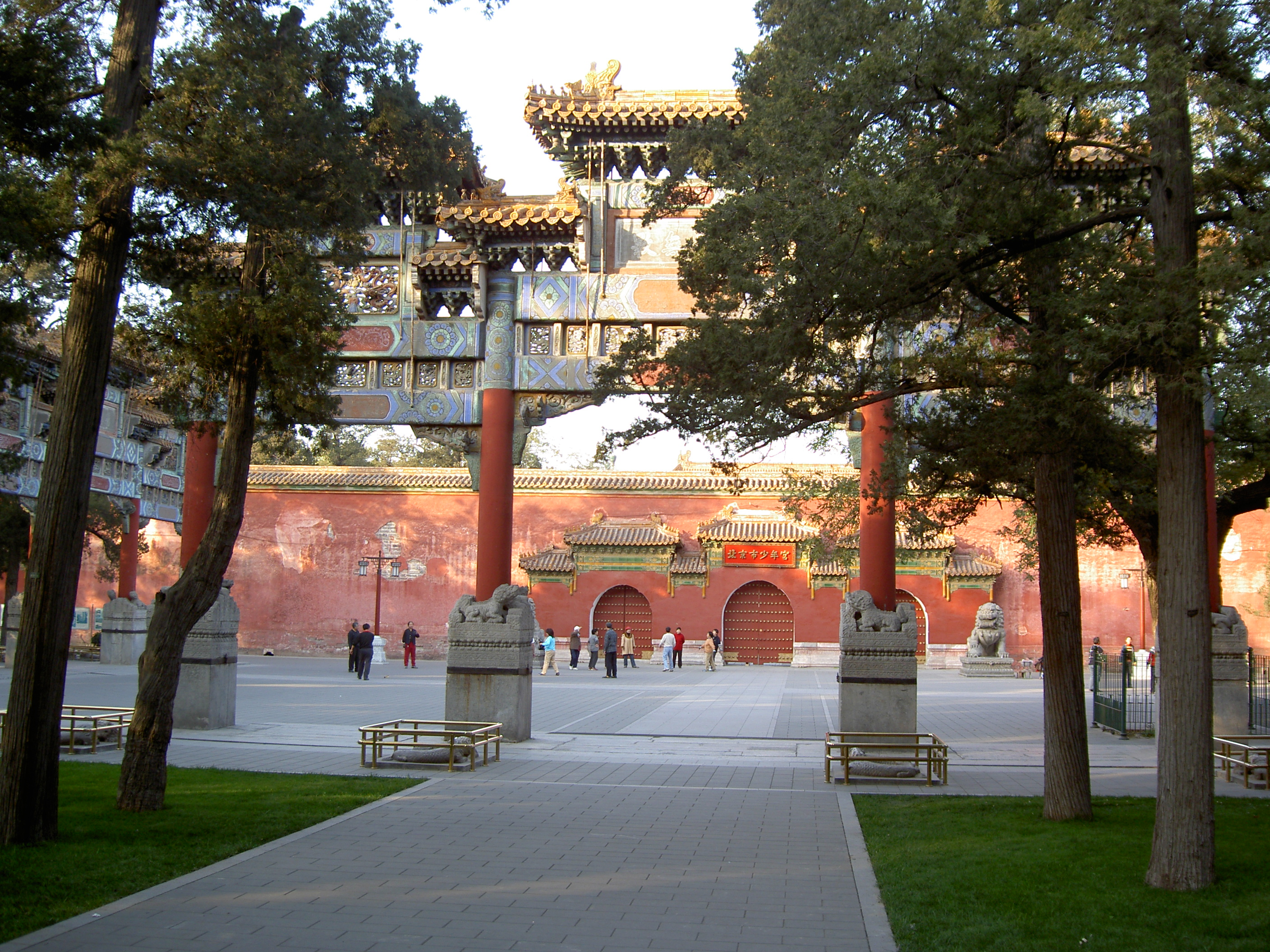
Jingshan Hill, an artificial hill with five peaks located to the north of the Forbidden City.

In the Yuan dynasty, Beijing was known as Dadu, and the Imperial City formed the centre of the city. In 1368, the Ming armies conquered Dadu, and changed its name to "Beiping" (the two characters meaning "north" and "peace" or "pacified"), with the capital moved to Nanjing. Because the Imperial City was untouched by battle, most of it survived the war; however, in 1369, the Hongwu Emperor ordered that the Imperial City, a remnant from Mongol Yuan rule over China, be demolished.

In 1370, the Hongwu Emperor's fourth son Zhu Di was created Prince of Yan, with seat in Beiping. In 1379 he built a princely palace within the Yuan Imperial City.

In 1399, Zhu Di launched a coup d'état and ascended to the throne to become Yongle Emperor in 1402. In 1403, the name of Beiping was changed to Beijing (literally "the Northern Capital"), and in 1406 a plan was drafted to move the capital to Beijing.

In 1406, construction of the Forbidden City began, copying the layout of the existing palaces in Nanjing. The new imperial palace was placed in the site of Yuan palace. Earth dug up from construction of the moat were used to construct Jingshan Hill to the north of the imperial palace.

On the basis of the Yuan Imperial City, the area was expanded to encompass the lakes of Zhongnanhai and Beihai and a significant area beyond.

== Ming dynasty ==
The Imperial City centres on the Forbidden City. To the west of the Forbidden City are the Zhongnanhai and Beihai, which were surrounded by imperial gardens and collectively known as the Western Park or Xiyuan.

To the north of the Forbidden City is Jingshan Park contains Jingshan Hill and Shouhuang Hall.

To the south of the Forbidden City are the Imperial Shrine of Family or Imperial Ancestral Temple and Altar of Earth and Harvests. Further to the south was the "Corridor of a Thousand Steps" outside Chengtianmen Gate, to either side of which are the offices of the various government ministries.

There are seven gates in the walls of the Imperial City. To the south is the Great Ming Gate (later renamed the Great Qing Gate, Gate of China). Behind the Great Ming Gate was the Chengtianmen Gate, (later renamed the Tian'anmen, "Gate of Heavenly Peace"). To either side of the Chengtianmen were the Left Chang'an Gate and the Right Chang'an Gate. To the east was Dong'anmen Gate ("Gate of Eastern Peace"); to the west was the Xi'anmen Gate ("Gate of Western Peace"). To the north was Bei'anmen (later renamed the Di'anmen, "Gate of Earthly Peace").

Also housed in the Imperial City were a number of service buildings for the imperial palace, warehouses, Taoist temples, and a palace for the Imperial Grandson.

== Qing dynasty ==
After the fall of the Ming dynasty, the rulers of the Qing removed most of the service buildings. Apart from a narrow area surrounding the lakes of Zhongnanhai and Beihai, the western parts of the Imperial City were given to princes and members of the Eight Banners as residential land. Likewise, apart from a small number of warehouses, the eastern parts of the Imperial City were also given to members of the Eight Banners as residential land. To the collection of temples in the Imperial City was added a Catholic church on the western shore of Zhongnanhai.

== Republic of China to present ==
After the fall of the Qing dynasty in 1912, the Republic of China government took over the Imperial City. Zhongnanhai was, for a time, converted into the Presidential Palace for Beiyang Government. The Imperial Ancestral Temple became a part of the Palace Museum. Beihai and Jingshan became public parks. Most of the former temples and imperial warehouses gradually became private residences.

In 1912, during a coup by warlord Cao Kun, the Dong'anmen gate was destroyed by fire. In 1914, the Corridor of a Thousand Steps was demolished to make way for Zhongshan Park, named after Sun Yat-sen. In 1915, in order to improve traffic, much of the wall surrounding the Imperial City was demolished except the southern wall along Chang'an Avenue. After the capital was moved to Nanjing, Zhongnanhai became a public park.

In 1949, the People's Republic of China was established in Beijing. In the next few years, Gate of China, Left Chang'an Gate, Right Chang'an Gate, the three remaining eastern and western gates, and Di'anmen were demolished. Zhongnanhai became the presidential palace of the new government, housing the central headquarters of the Chinese Communist Party and the State Council of the People's Republic of China. Many of the surviving buildings in the former garden were demolished.

The area to the west of Beihai Park were occupied by the Department of Defence, with a large office building now dominating the park skyline. Most of the temples in the Imperial City were occupied by units of the People's Liberation Army. Some of these buildings remain occupied and are in severe disrepair.

In recent decade, the Beijing municipal government has restored several of these temples, and established a park around the remaining sections of the Imperial City wall. Plans were drawn up to gradually move out institutions occupying various historical buildings. In 2004, a 1984 ordinance relating to building height and planning restriction was renewed to establish the Imperial City area and the northern city area as a buffer zone for the Forbidden City. In 2005, a proposal was released to include the Imperial City and Beihai as extension items to the Forbidden City as a World Heritage Site.

== See also ==
- Beijing city fortifications
- History of Beijing
