= Qingnianhu Park =

Urban park in Beijing, China

Coordinates: 39°57′22″N 116°24′14″E

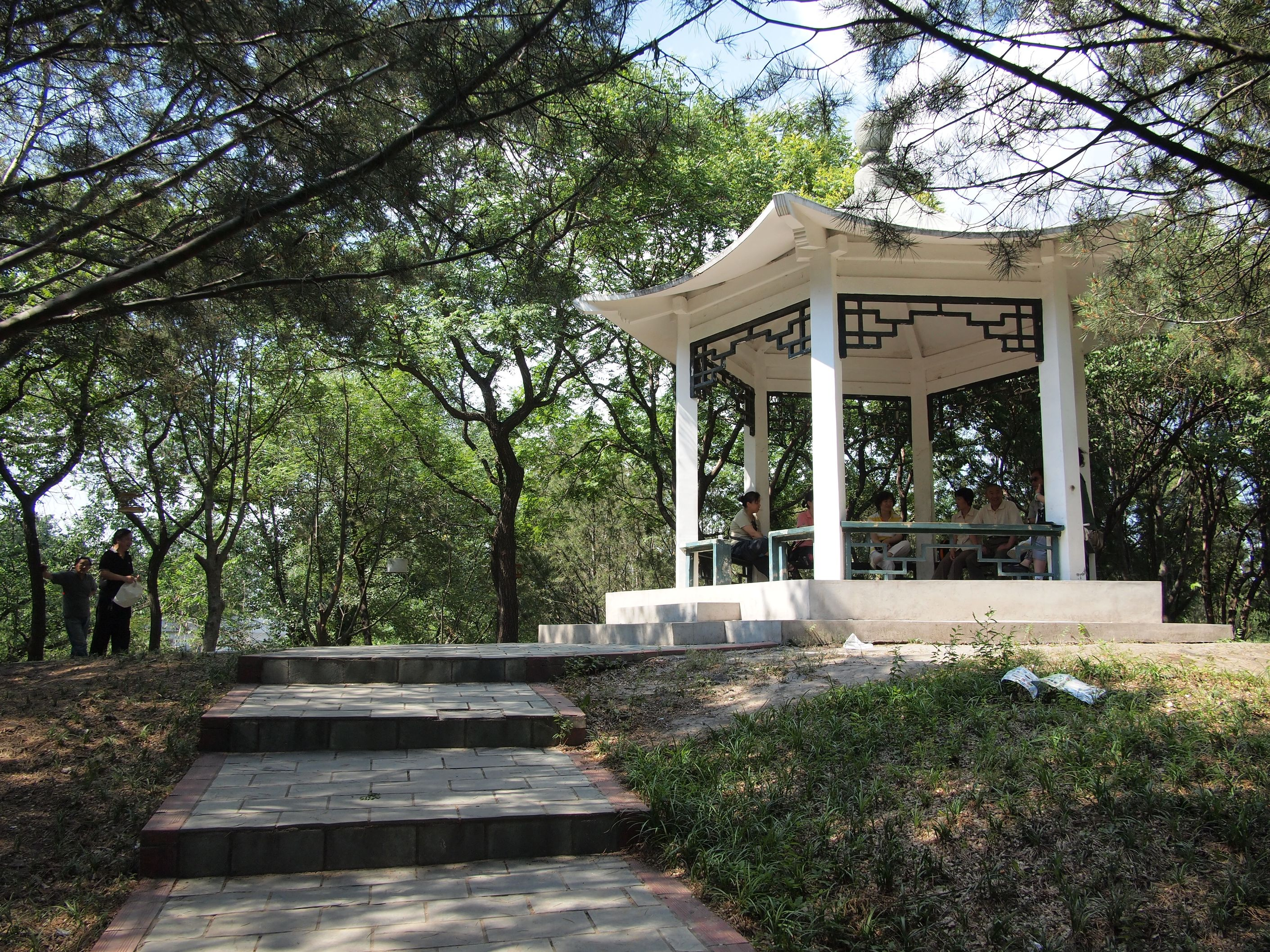
Qingnianhu Park

Qingnianhu Park (Chinese: 青年湖; pinyin: Qīngnián Hú; literally "Youth Lake") is a city park in Beijing, situated in Dongcheng District, west of Andingmenwai Street. The park was built in 1960 and covers an area of 170,000 square metres (1,800,000 sq ft). Qingnianhu, or Youth Lake, accounts for about a third of the park's area. The lake was dug by teenage volunteers organized by the local government in 1958. Public transportation can be used to get to the park, which lies just outside Ditan station served by bus lines 18, 104, and 108. An entrance fee of 2 yuan is required as of 2012.

== Features ==
Over 16,000 trees are spread across different scenic areas. Qingnianhu Park is known for its modern arts sculptures that complement the natural areas. Qingnianhu Water World is a huge outdoor swimming pool inside the park. The park also features numerous attractions for children including bumper cars, a mini race circuit, and a swinging pirate ship. Adults can enjoy activities such as gate-ball, fishing, ice skating, and public fitness equipment. A small driving range, cafés, and a restaurant are also present.

== See also ==
- List of Beijing landmarks
