= Xiancantan =

Coordinates: 39°55′52″N 116°23′10″E

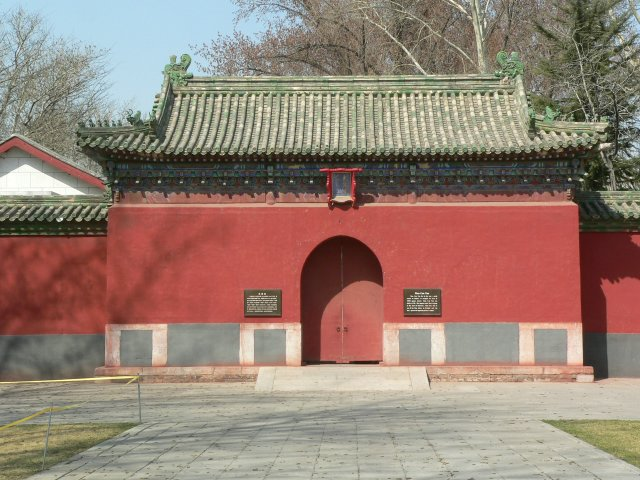
Entrance gate to the Xiancantan

The Xiancantan (Chinese: 先蚕坛), known in English as Altar to the Goddess of Silkworms, is an imperial altar in Beijing, China, similar to the Imperial Ancestral Hall, Xiannongtan (Temple of Agriculture) and the Altar of Earth and Harvests. It is located at the eastern ground of the Beihai Park, a large imperial garden in the city's historical centre. It can be reached by a bridge from the Temple of the Dragon King (Longwangmiao).

The Xiancantan (Altar to the Goddess of Silkworms) was built in 1742 during the Qianlong period (1736-1796) of Qing Dynasty. The Xiancantan was built for Leizu, the wife of the Yellow Emperor, who is credited with the invention of sericulture. Entering through the Gate of Admiration for Silkworms, one could see a 1.3-metre-high altar and a staircase on each side leads to the site where sacrificial rituals were performed.

The site is also known for its Mulberry trees, which provides regular diet for silkworms. Behind the temple, there are several halls dedicated to the Silkworms.

== See also ==
- Nine Altars and Eight Temples

== See also ==
- Beihai Park
- Tourist attractions of Beijing
