= Milu Yuan =

Public park in Beijing, China

Coordinates: 39.7789°N 116.4579°E

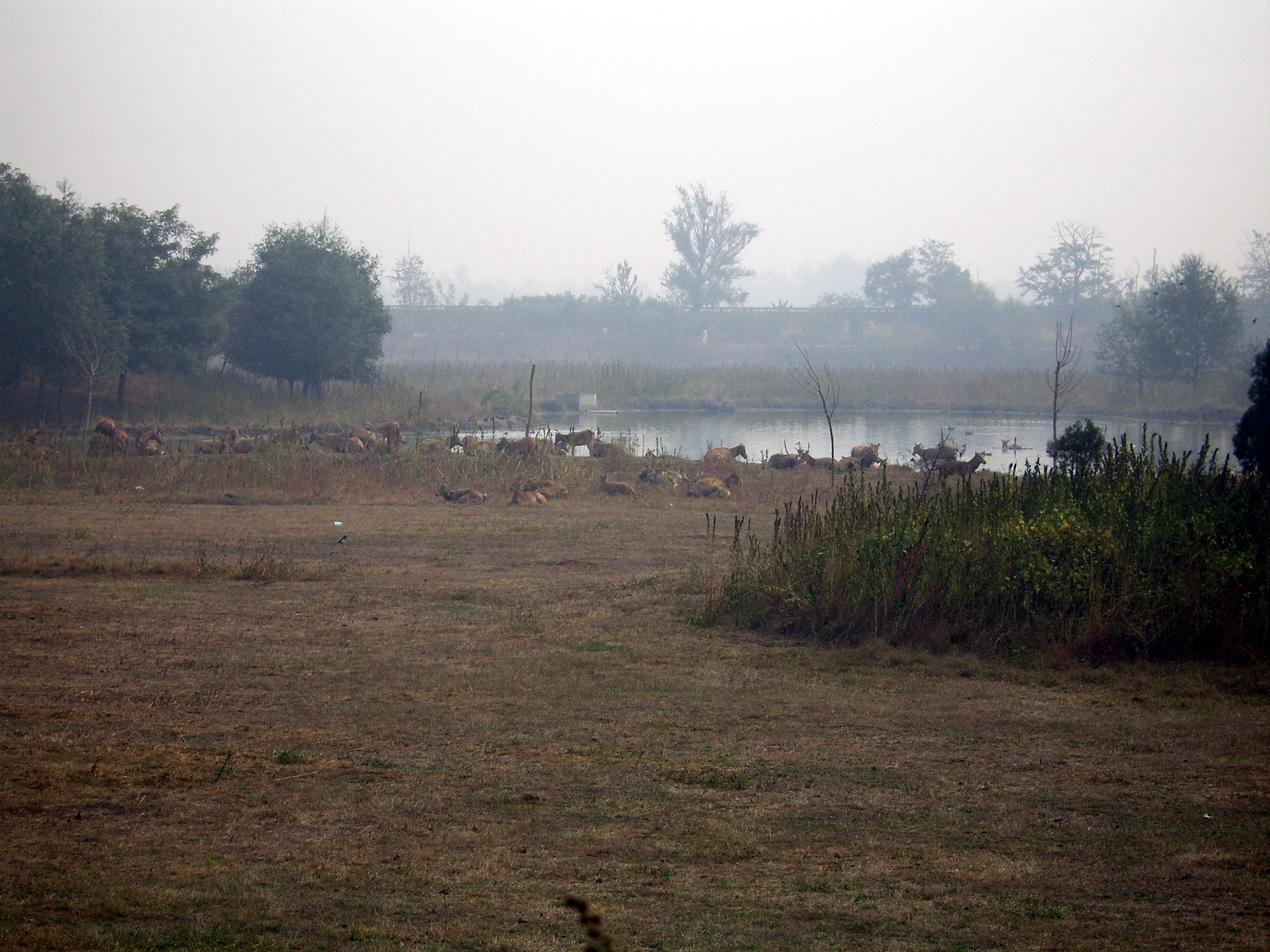
A herd of milu or Père David's Deer, after which the park is named.

The Milu Park, or Milu Yuan (Chinese: 麋鹿苑; pinyin: Mílù Yuán), is a large public park located in southern Beijing, China named after its captive breeding herd of milu or Père David's deer. It was once called the Nanyuan Garden or Nanhaizi Garden, which was the imperial hunting grounds for Ming and Qing emperors. The gardens, palaces, forests, rivers, marshes and grasslands used to be enclosed by walls and gates.

Milu Yuan is now a public park and an ecological research center that serves as a natural park for animals in Beijing. Among the attractions are the Père David's deer or milu a deer that became extinct in China toward the end of the 19th century during the Qing dynasty. The deer was re-introduced to Beijing from Britain, mainly the Whipsnade Wild Animal Park, in the 1980s. On March 18, 1999 the park celebrated the birth of a Père David's deer, the first wild birth in centuries. As of 2010, Milu Yuan had the highest population of Père David's deer worldwide.
