= Jietai Temple =

Buddhist Temple in Mentougou District, China

- 戒台寺
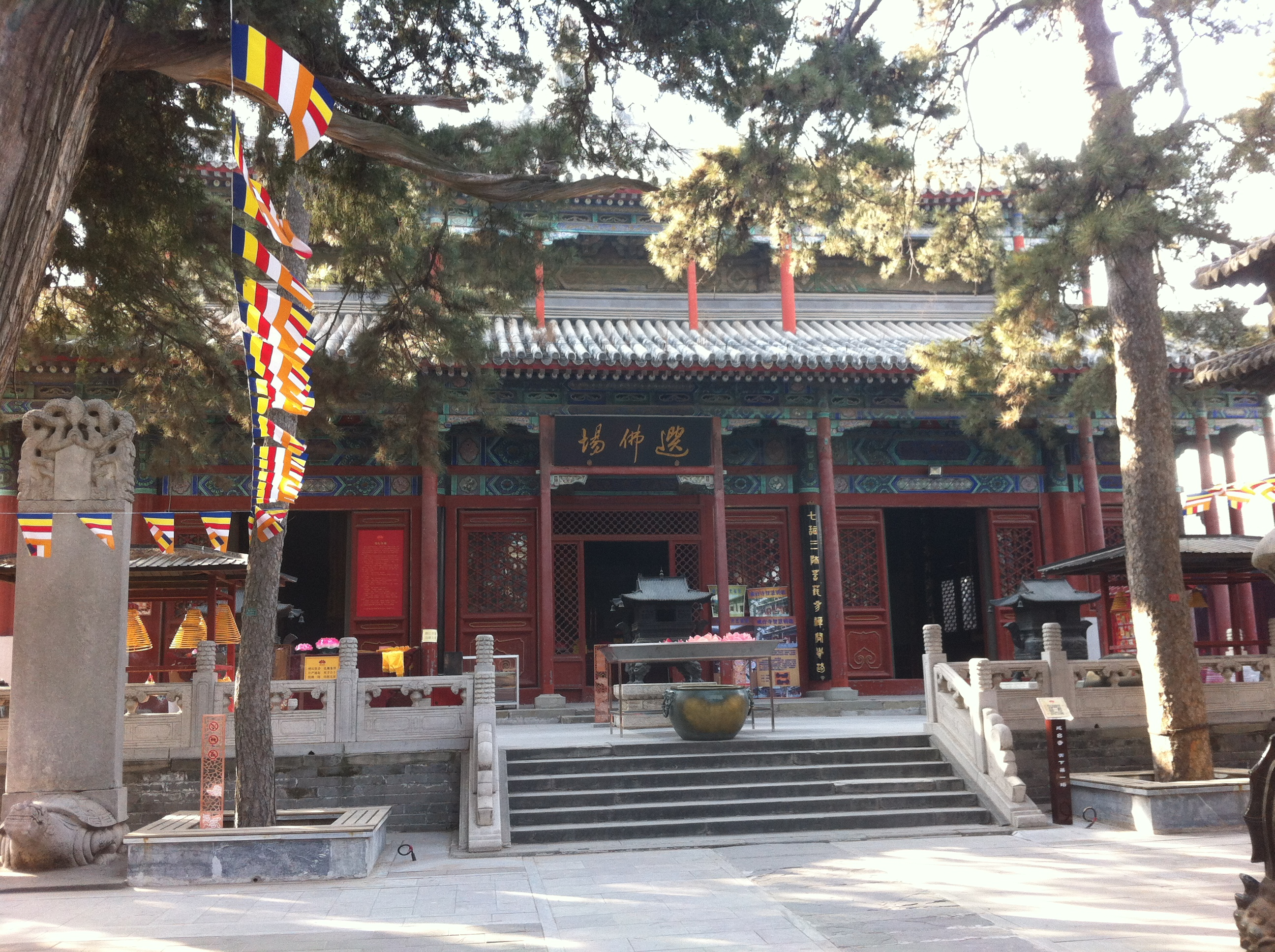
- Jietai Temple

- Location on Beijing.

Religion
- Affiliation: Buddhism

Location
- Location: Beijing
- Country: China
- Coordinates: 39°52′08″N 116°04′48″E

Architecture
- Style: Chinese architecture
- Established: 622

Jietai Temple (Chinese: 戒台寺; pinyin: Jiè Tāi Sì) is a Buddhist temple in Mentougou District in western Beijing, China. It was constructed during the Tang dynasty, with major modifications made during the Ming and Qing dynasties.

Like the older Tanzhe Temple nearby along China National Highway 108, Jietai Temple is now a tourist attraction of Beijing.

The temple is located on the mountainside of the Ma'an mountain approximately 25 kilometers from downtown Beijing. It was first built in the Kaihuang period of the Sui dynasty (581–600) and was originally called the Huiju Temple (Wisdom Accumulation Temple).

The ordination altar in Jietai Temple is known as one of the three largest ordination altars in China together with the other two in Kaiyuan Temple in Quanzhou, Fujian and Zhaoqing Temple in Hangzhou, Zhejiang. As it has largest construction scale, so it is also called the "First Altar in the World" (天下第一坛).

== History ==
Jietai Temple was first built in 622, in the 5th year of Wude period in the Tang dynasty (618–907) with the name of "Huiju Temple" (慧聚寺).

In 1069, in the 5th year of Xianyong period in the Liao dynasty (907–1125), master Fajun (法均) founded the ordination altar in the temple. Monks from different areas gathered here to observe the precepts, hence the name "Jietan Temple" (戒坛寺; Jietan means the ordination altar).

== Architecture ==
=== Jietan Hall (Hall of Ordination Altar) ===
Jietan Hall is the most important hall in Jietai Temple. It was first built in 1069, in the 5th year of Xianyong period in the Liao dynasty (907–1125) and was renovated in the Jin dynasty (1115–1234), Yuan dynasty (1279–1368), Ming dynasty (1368–1644) and Qing dynasty (1644–1911). It still preserves the architectural style of the Liao dynasty.

Inside the hall, a plaque with "树精进幢" (树精进幢 means after observing precepts in the temple, monks can write their own books) written by Qianlong Emperor is hung on the architrave. Another plaque with "清戒" written by Kangxi Emperor is hung in the interior side of the architrave.

A large square ordination altar which is 3.25-metre (10.7 ft) high and made of bluestone is placed in the middle of the hall. The three layers of the ordination altar are all shaped in Sumeru thrones with carved patterns of clouds and grass. It is surrounded by niches enshrining colored clay sculptures of "deities of precepts" (戒神). On the ordination altar enshrines a clay statue of Sakyamuni which is sitting on a 3-metre (9.8 ft) high lotus throne. In front of the Buddha statue, ten red sandalwood chairs and ten dragon-carved desks are put for the 10 precept masters who will witness the precepts ceremony, namely three masters to witness the ceremony and seven to prove it.

== Other ==
=== Pine trees ===
Jietai Temple is also renowned for its old and grotesque pine trees. They were mostly planted in the Tang dynasty (618–907) and Song dynasty (960–1279), and have formed a varied grotesque appearance in the thousand years since. During the Ming and Qing dynasties (1368–1911), the "Ten Grotesque Pine Trees" (十大奇松) were known to the world, which attracted many literati to come and compose poems to eulogize them. Some well-known old pine trees are Leisure Pine Tree (自在松), Lying Dragon Pine Tree (臥龍松), Nine Dragon Pine Tree (九龍松), Pagoda Embracing Pine Tree (抱塔松), Active Pine Tree (活動松) and so on.

== Gallery ==
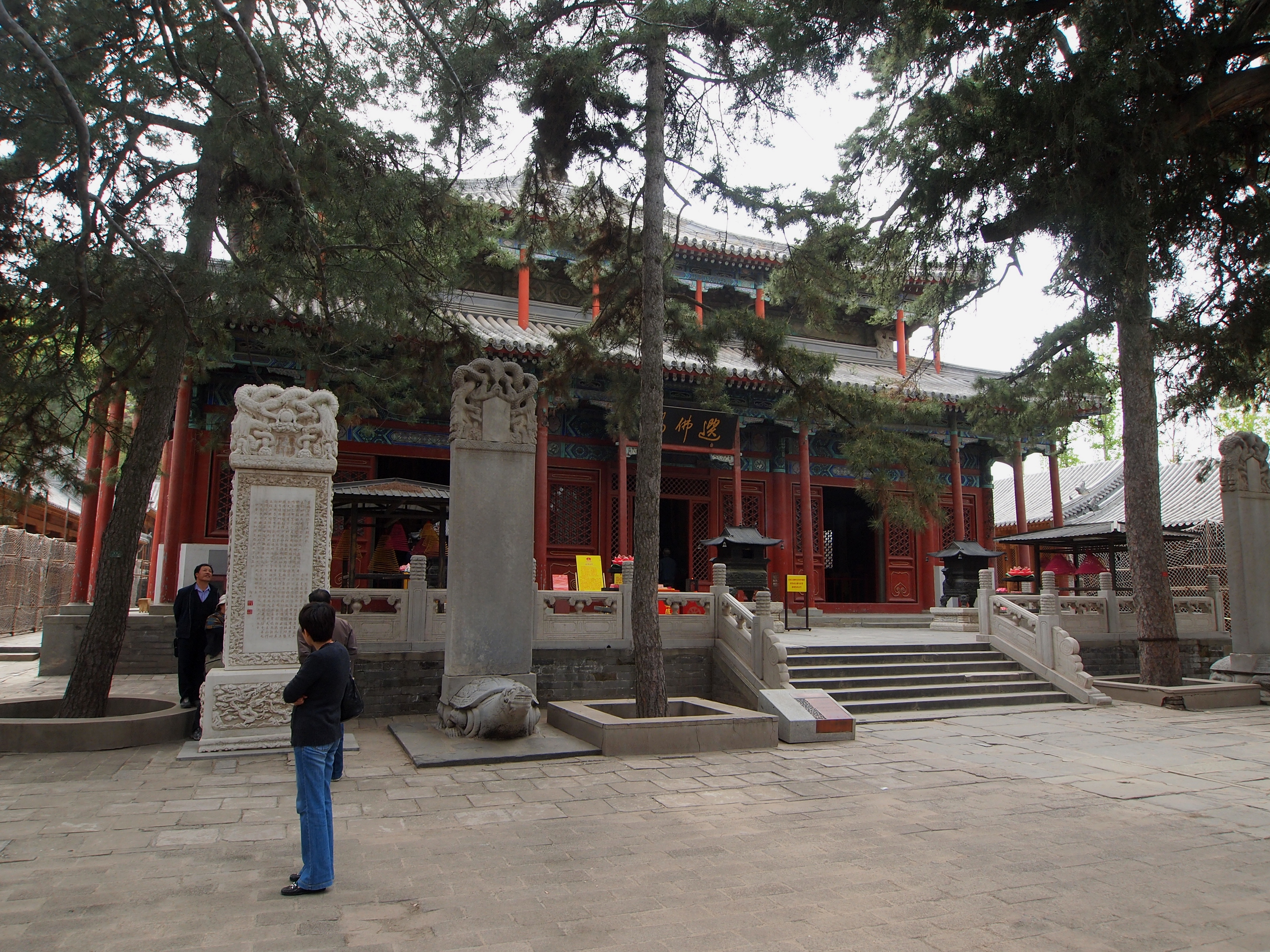
The Ordination Altar Hall.

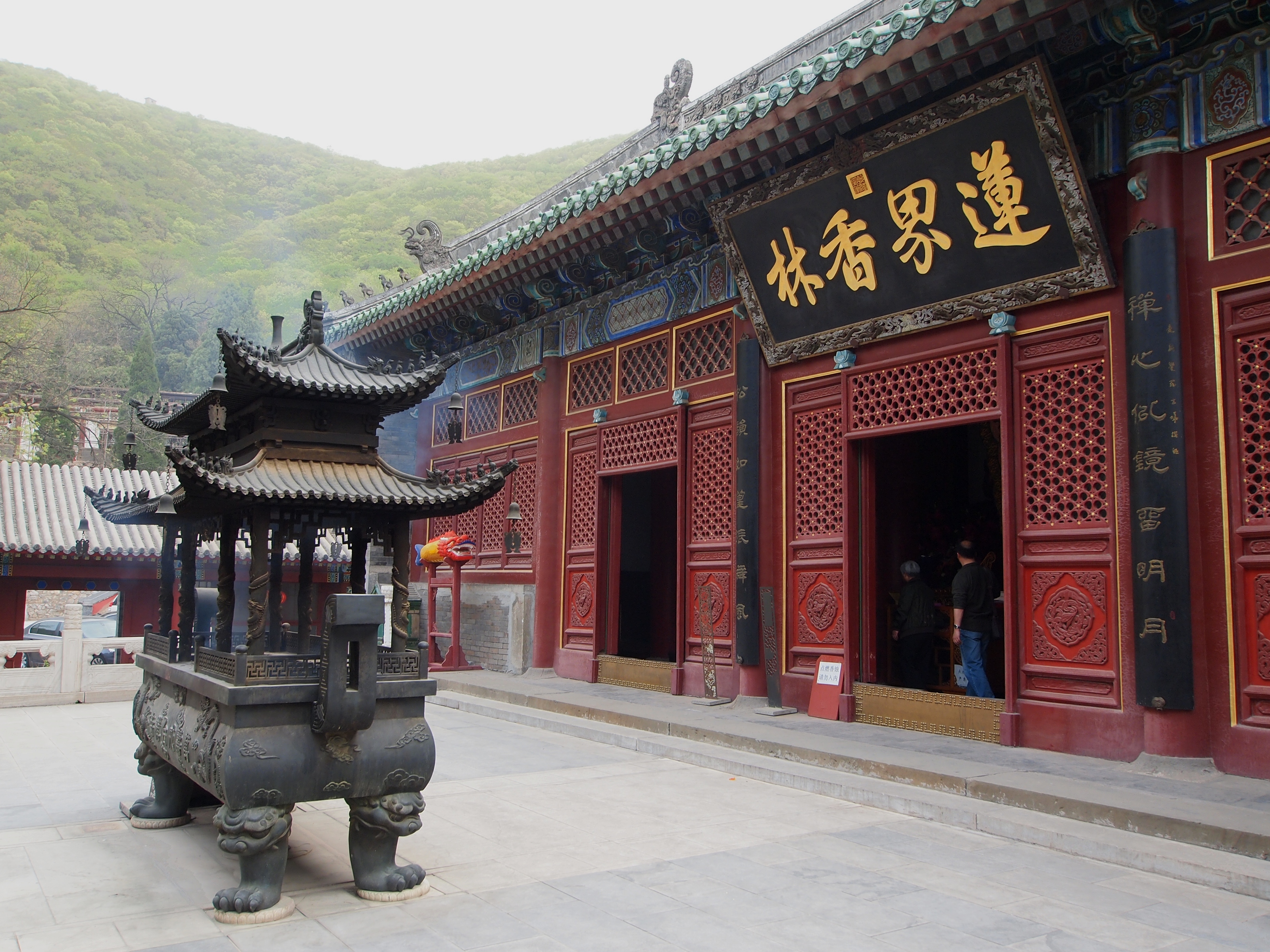
The Mahavira Hall.

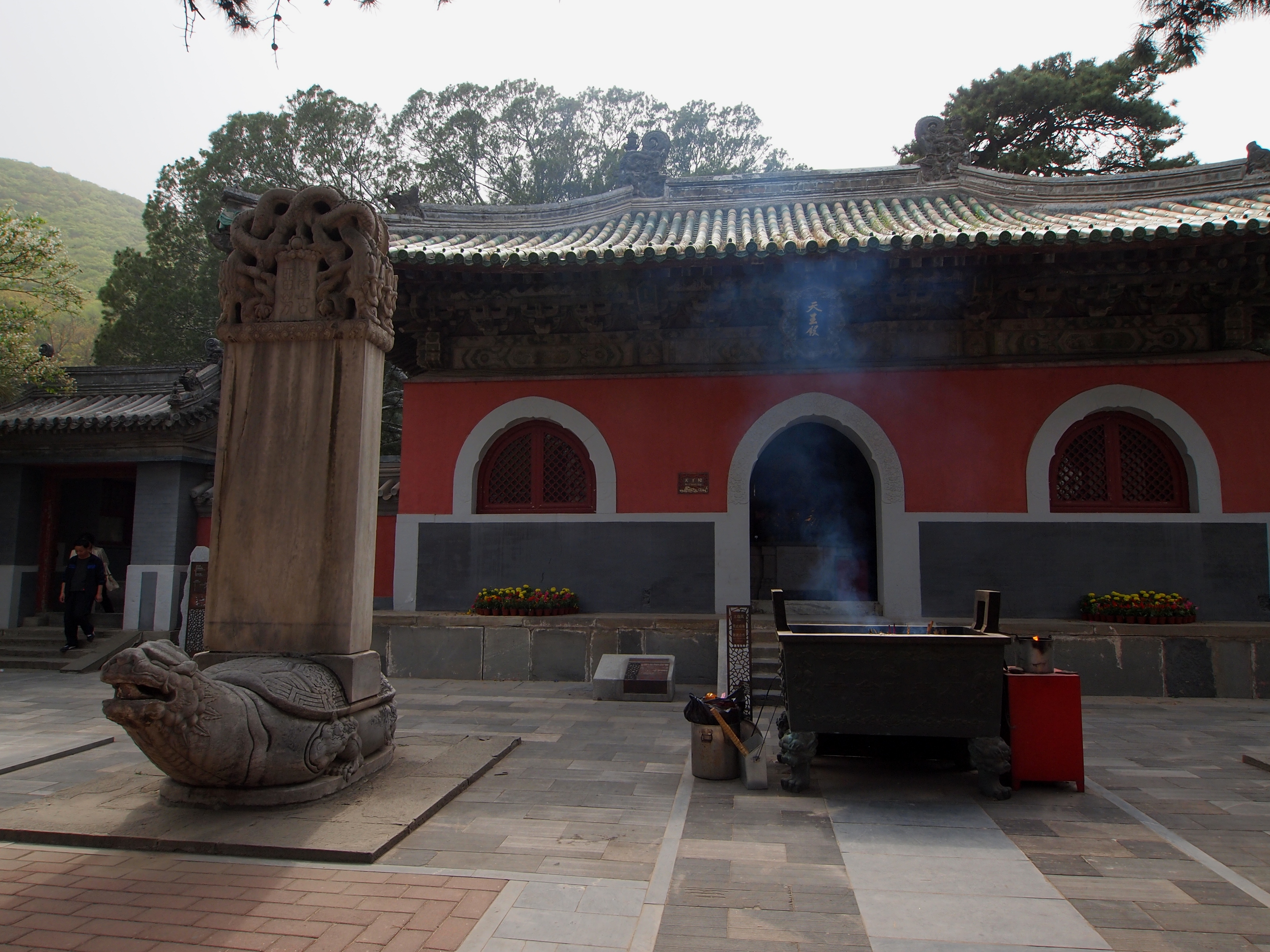
The Four Heavenly Kings Hall.

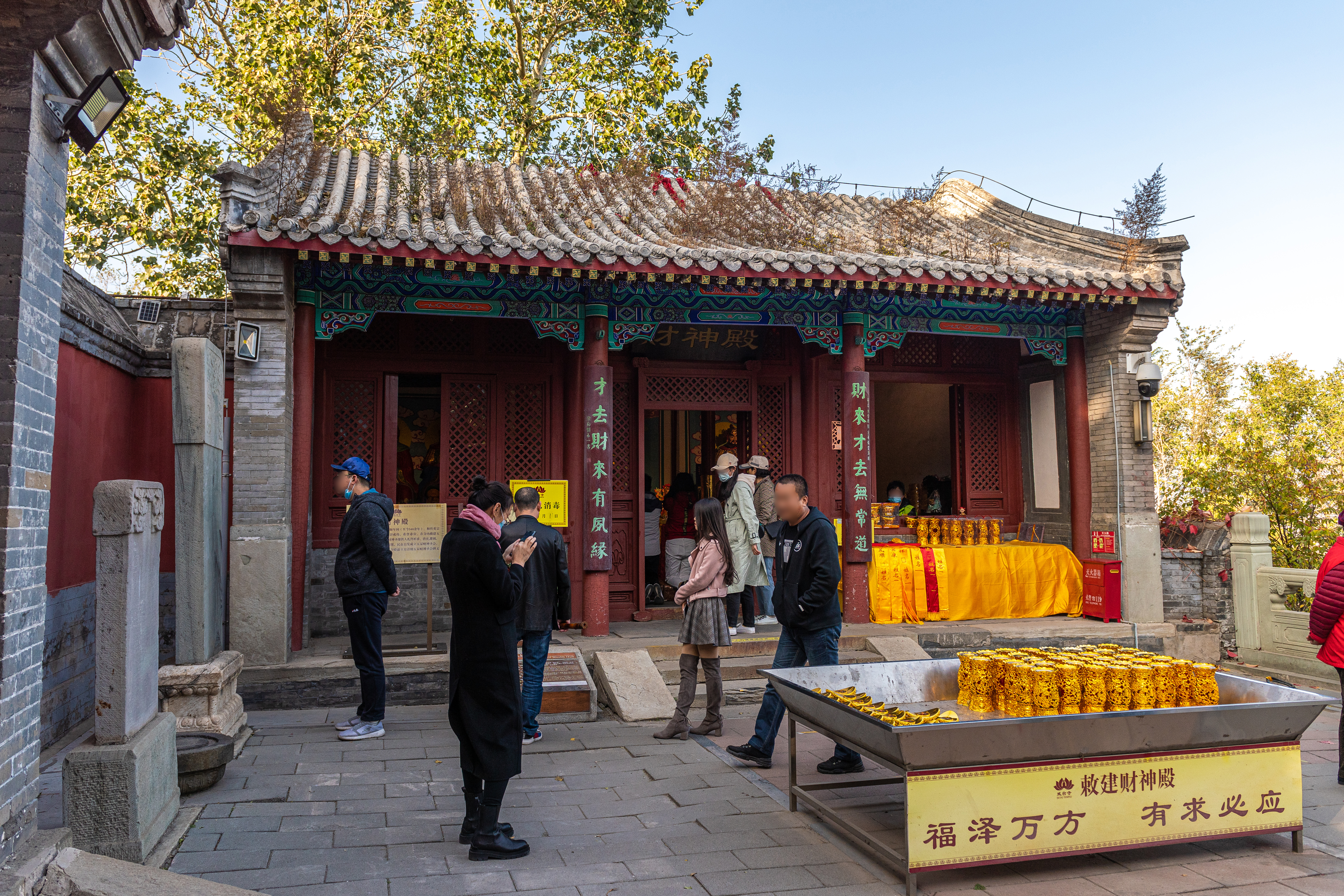
The Hall of Gods of Wealth.

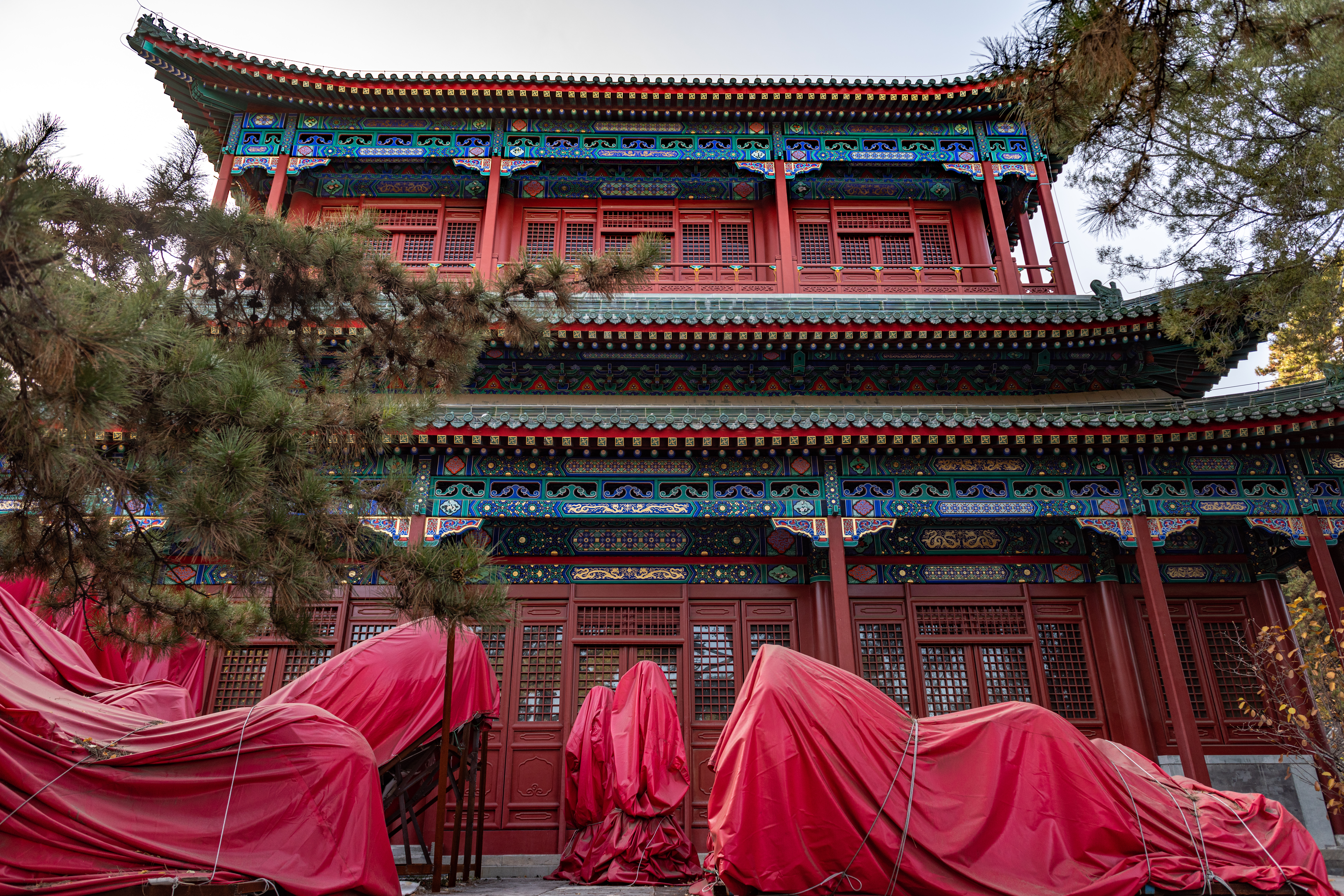
The Thousand-Buddha Pavilion, rebuilt in 2015.

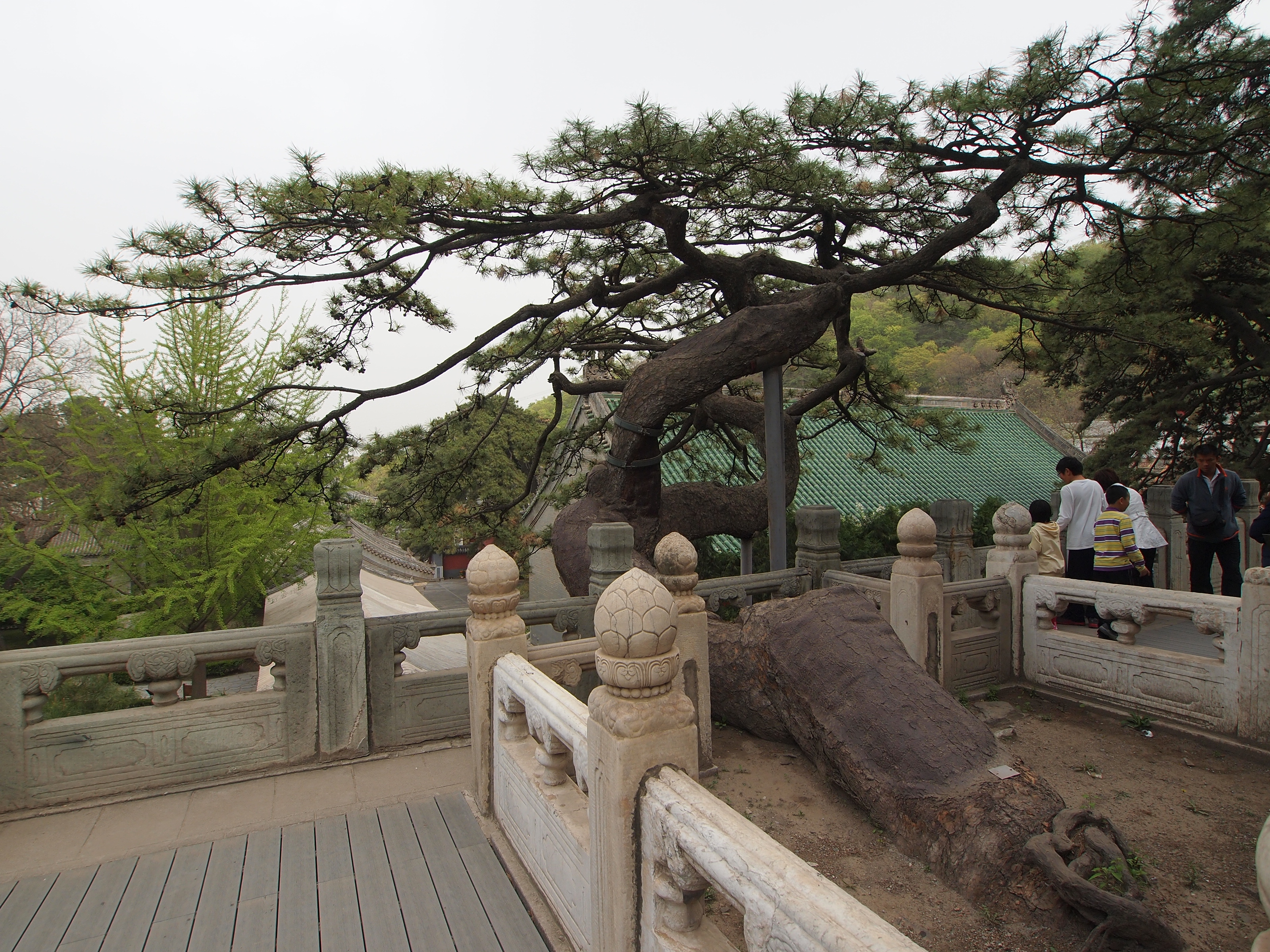
The Lying Dragon Pine Tree (卧龙松).

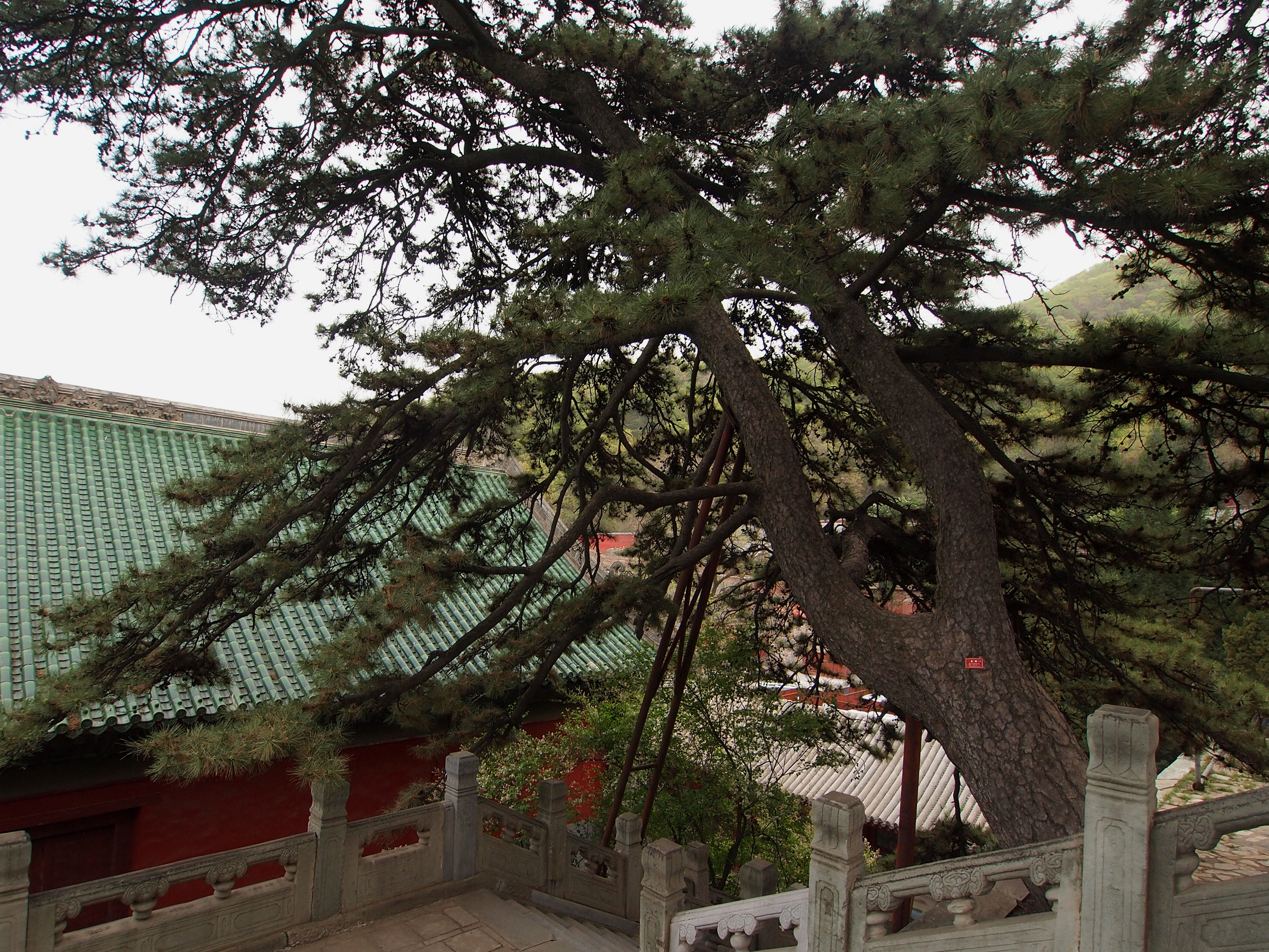
The Leisure Pine Tree (自在松).

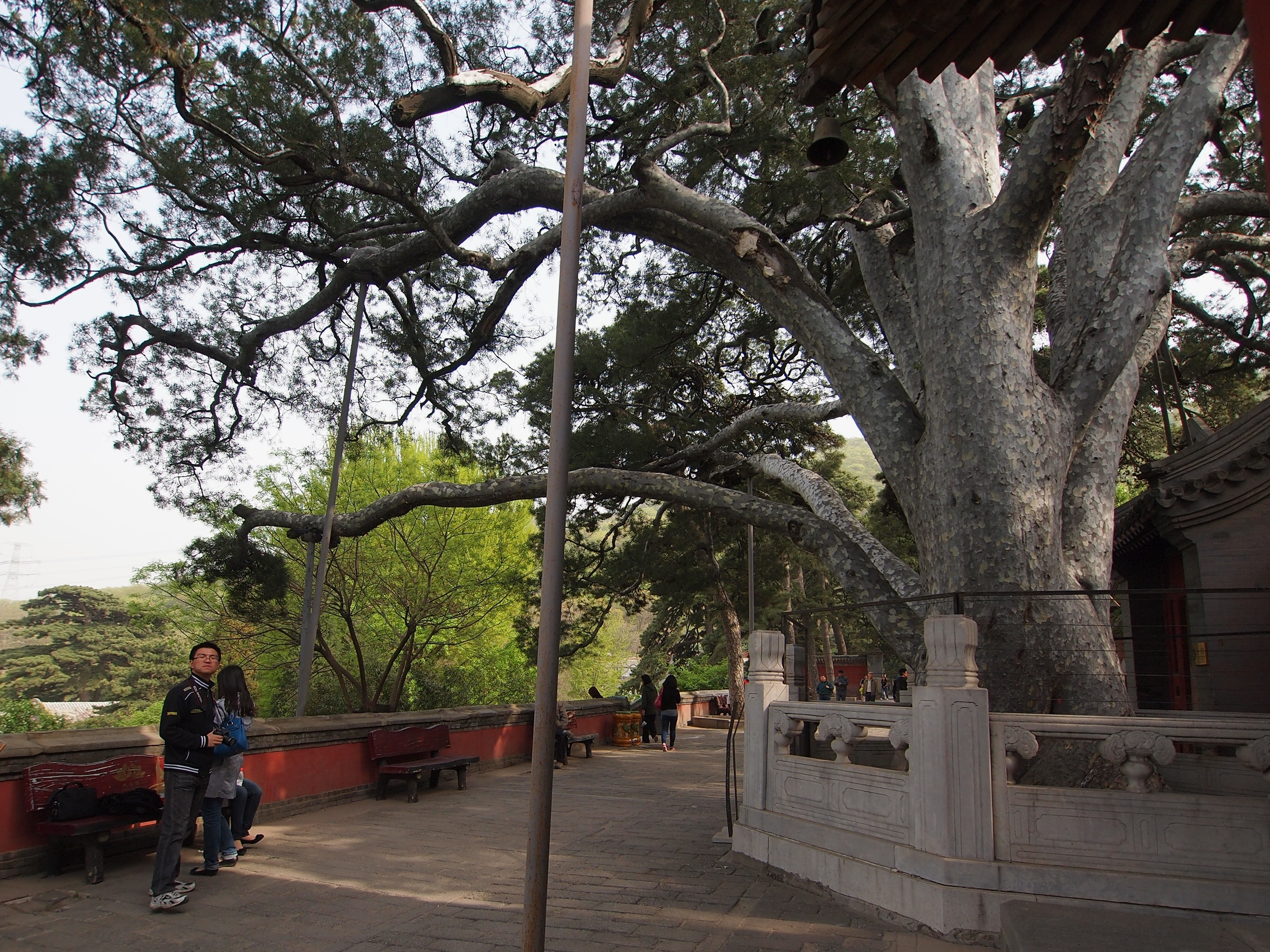
The Nine Dragon Pine Tree (九龙松).
