= Wuzuolou Forest Park =

Chinese nature reserve

Coordinates: 40.5090°N 116.8116°E

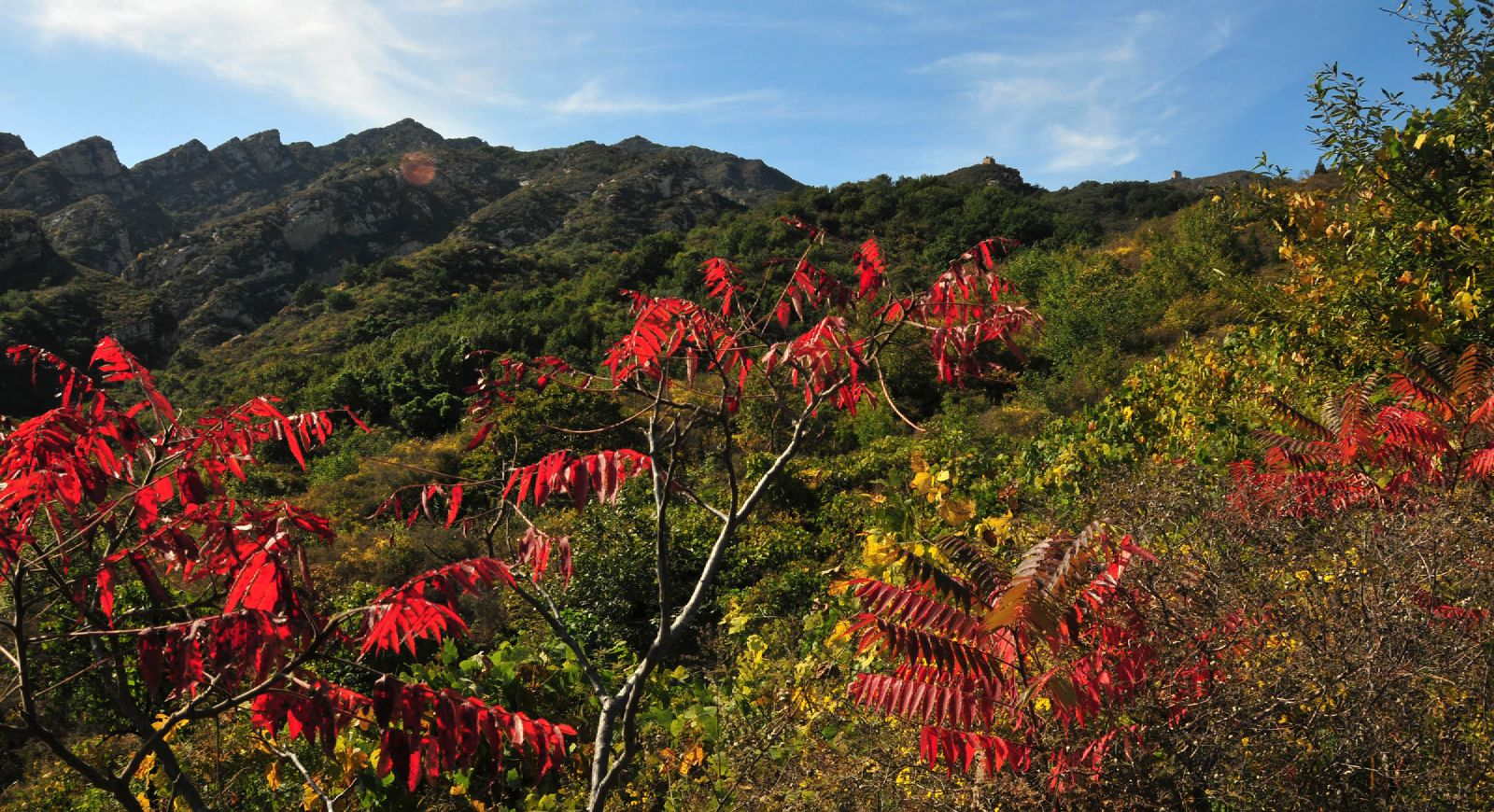

Wuzuolou Forest Park (simplified Chinese: 五座楼森林公园; traditional Chinese: 五座樓森林公園; pinyin: Wǔzuòlóu Sēnlín Gōngyuán) is a large natural reserve and public park located in the northern suburb of Beijing, China.

The park covers a total area of 1,400 ha (14 km^{2}), and the highest peak within the Wuzuolou Forest Park is 1,020 m (3,350 ft) above sea level. About 73% of the park is covered by forest, and the coverage includes high and steep mountains, deep valleys, thick forests, deep ponds and waterfall. Notable sites within the forest park include Bixia Dai Spring House, Forest Park, and Qiuhong winter white.
