= Wofo Temple =

Buddhist temple in Beijing

Coordinates: 40.0053°N 116.201°E

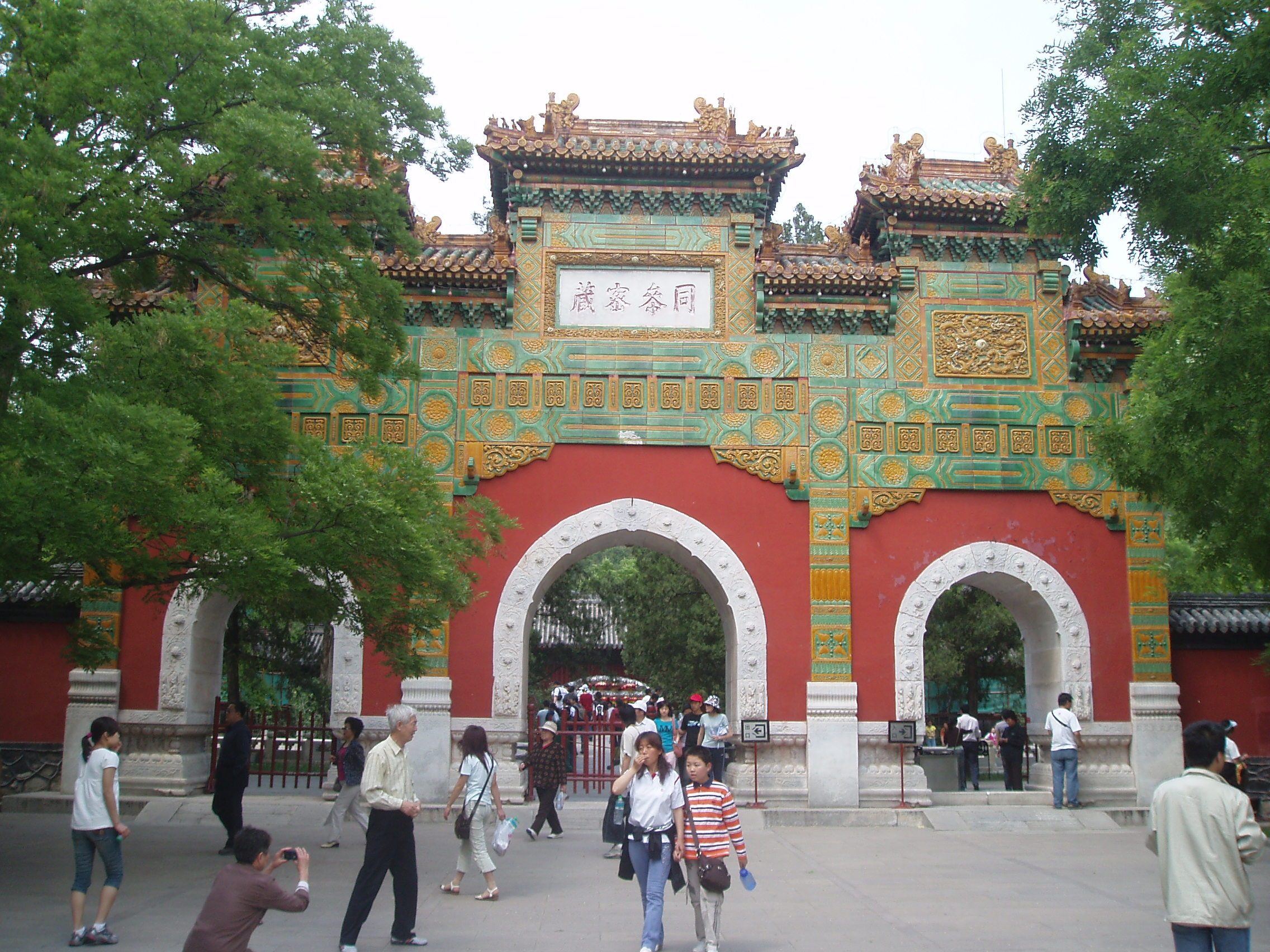
The main gate of the Wofo Temple

Wofo Temple (Chinese: 卧佛寺; pinyin: Wòfó Sì) is a Buddhist temple located near the Beijing Botanical Garden 20 kilometres (12 mi) from the center of Beijing. The temple is the location of a recumbent Buddha sculpture, created in 1321.

== History ==
The temple was first built in the 7th century and known as the Doulu temple. During the following centuries temple was destroyed and rebuilt numerous times while also undergoing name changes. The current incarnation dates from 1734. The temple's first recumbent Buddha was carved in sandstone. In 1321, during the Yuan dynasty the sandstone carving was replaced by a 5.2 meter long statue made of bronze and weighing 2.5 tons.

== Layout ==
Following a north–south axis, the temple contains an entrance gate followed by three halls. On either side of the axis are buildings used by the monks for lodging as well as to accommodate guests. The first hall is called the Tianwang hall, the second the Sanshi Buddha hall, followed by the Recumbent Buddha hall.
