= Beijing Liao and Jin City Wall Museum =

Liao and Jin City Wall Museum
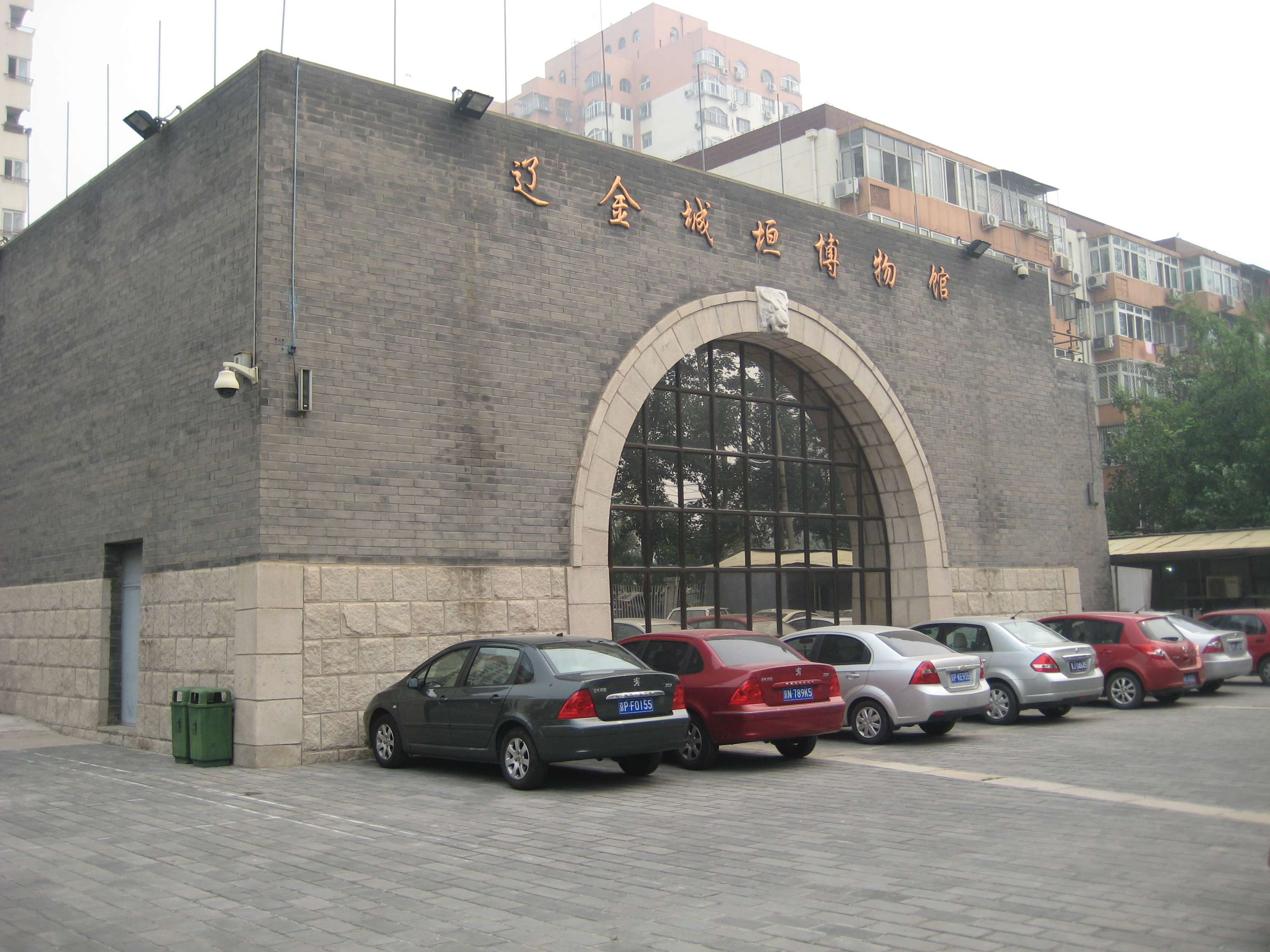
- The Liao and Jin Dynasty City Wall Museum
- Established: 1995
- Location: Beijing
- Coordinates: 39°51′41″N 116°21′9.5″E
- Type: Historical site, History museum
- Public transit access: Public Bus

The Beijing Liao and Jin Dynasty City Wall Museum (Chinese: 北京辽金城垣博物馆) is a museum built over the ruins of Beijing's Liao and Jin dynasty (1115–1234) city wall. The museum is located at No.41 Yulinli, Yulin South Road, in Fengtai District of southwestern Beijing, near the north bank of the Liangshui River.

== History ==
During the 12th century, the city of Beijing was centered to the southwest of the present day metropolis in southern Xicheng District (formerly Xuanwu District) and Fengtai District. The city known as Zhongdu was the capital of the Jin dynasty. In 1990, the remnants of a water gate in the city wall of Zhongdu was discovered at the site. The museum built over the water gate opened in 1995.The museum's display space of 2,500 square meter is primarily underground. The remnants of the water gate, a wood and stone structure, is 43.4 m in length with a tunnel that is 21 m long and 7.7 m wide. The museum also showcases Liao and Jin era artifacts unearthed in and around Beijing.

Admission to the museum is free.

== See also ==
- History of Beijing
- Beijing city fortifications
- List of museums in China
- Ming City Wall Relics Park
