= Dahui Temple =

Buddhist temple in Beijing, China

- Temple of Great Wisdom
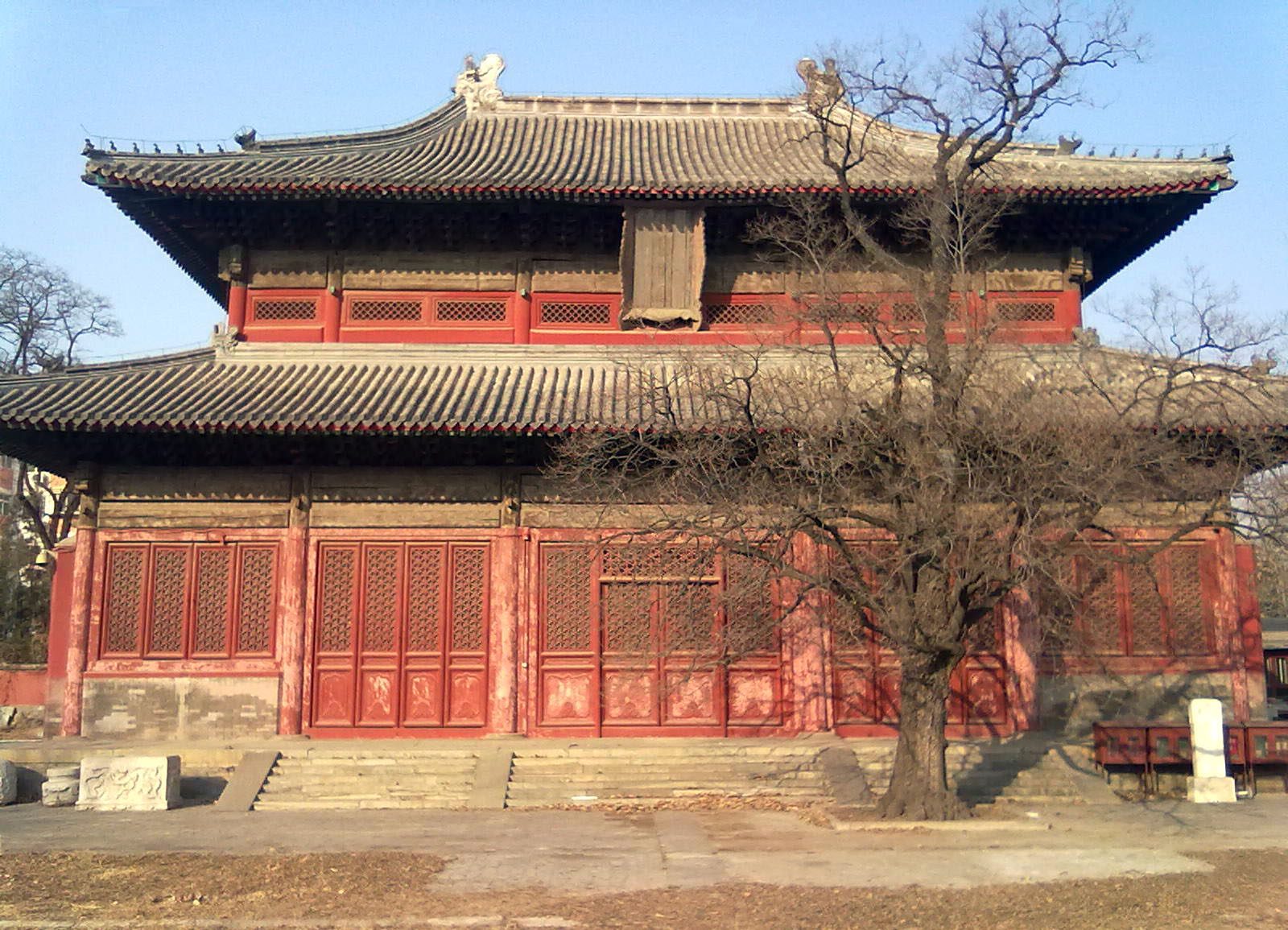
- Dahui Temple

Religion
- Affiliation: Buddhism

Location
- Location: Beijing
- Country: China
- Interactive map of Dahui Temple
- Coordinates: 39°57′06″N 116°19′24″E

The Dahui Temple (Chinese: 大慧寺), literally Temple of Great Wisdom, is a Ming Dynasty Buddhist temple located in Beijing. It is located in the western Haidian District of the city. It lies in the street Dahui Si Road near the Xueyuan Nan Road. It was first built in 1513, and restored in 1757. The temple is known for its Buddhist sculptures: 28 colored Buddhist statues, all over three meters tall. These carving are described to be great works of art of the Ming era.
