= Cheng'en Temple =

Buddhist temple in Beijing, China

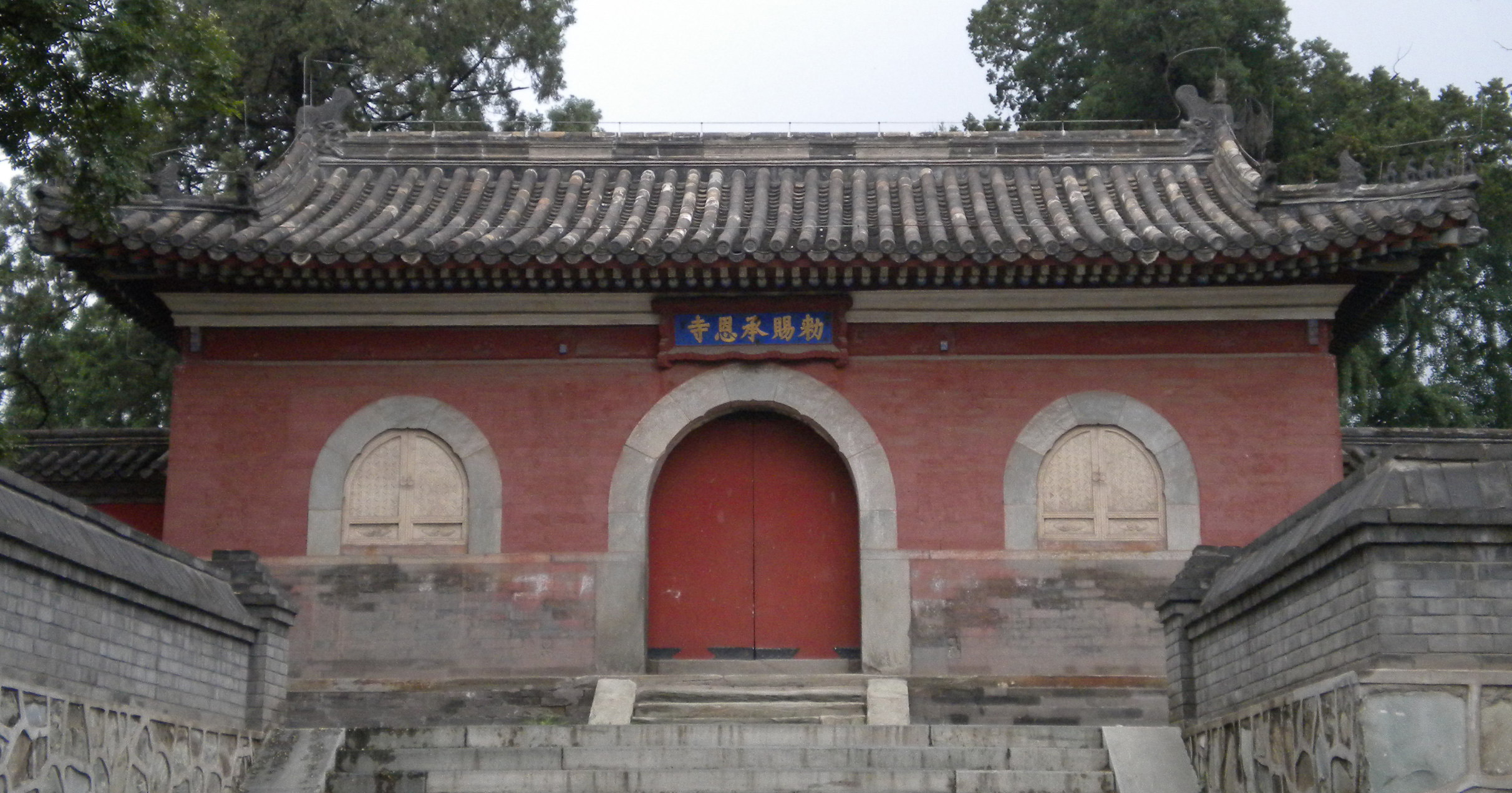
- The Cheng'en Temple

Religion
- Affiliation: Buddhism

Location
- Location: Beijing
- Country: China
- Interactive map of Cheng'en Temple
- Coordinates: 39°56′05″N 116°09′31″E

The Cheng'en Temple (Chinese: 承恩寺) is a Buddhist temple in Beijing, China. It was first founded during the Sui dynasty but later rebuilt several times, notably between 1510 and 1513 by the Zhengde Emperor of the Ming dynasty. The temple's main Daxiong Palace, clock and drum towers, and stone-sculpted Buddhas were constructed during the Ming dynasty. It also contains an important collection of Chinese religious art from the Ming dynasty, such as the murals on the interior walls of the Hall of Heavenly Kings (Tianwang dian).
