= Zhongshan Park (Beijing) =

Park in Beijing, China

Coordinates: 39°54′30″N 116°23′18″E

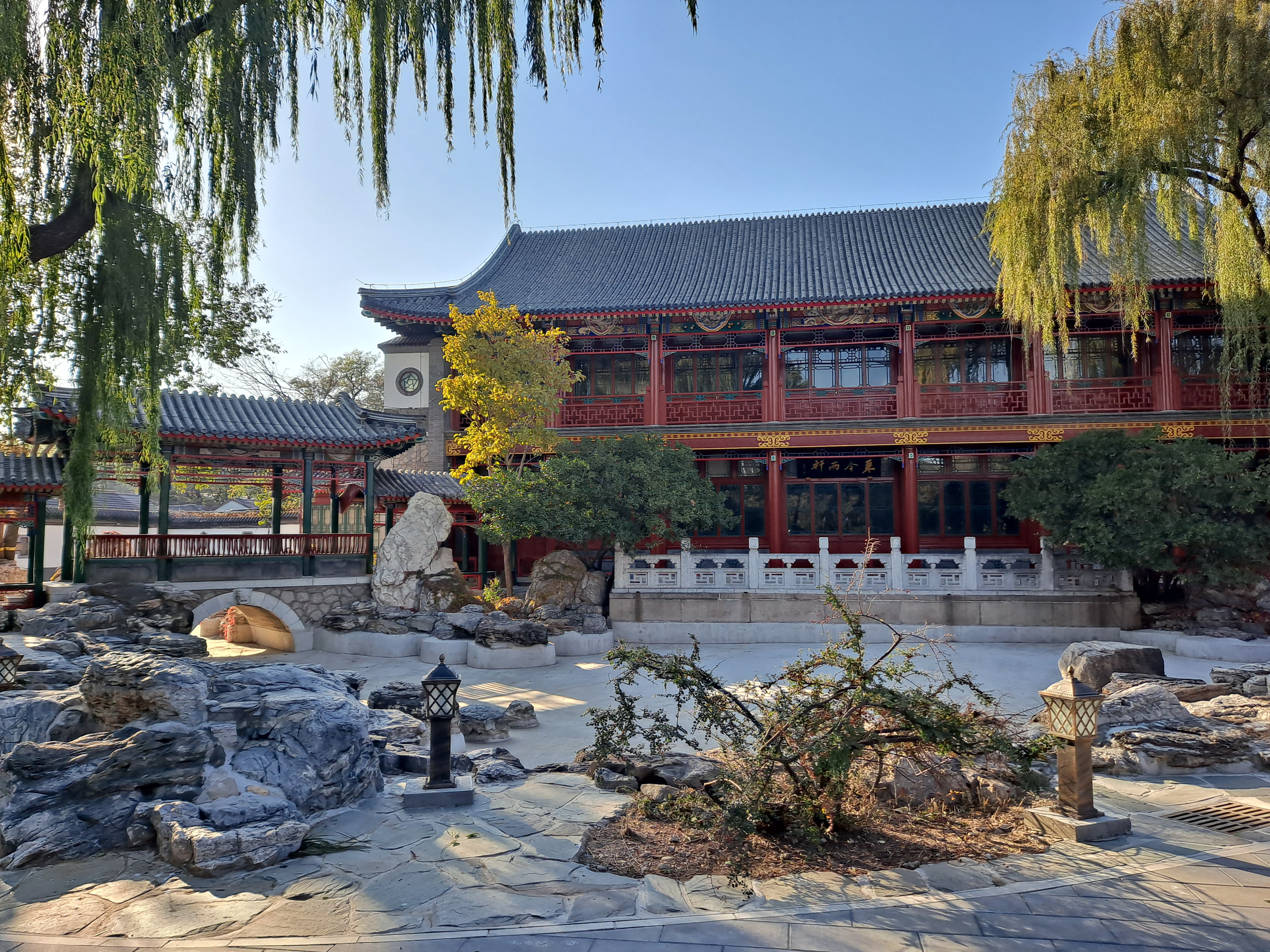
- The "Altar of Earth and Harvests" built in 1421
- Interactive map of Zhongshan Park
- Type: Urban park
- Location: Beijing, China
- Area: 23 hectares (57 acres)
- Created: 1421(as Altar of Land and Grain); 1928 (as a public park)
- Owner: Beijing Municipal Administration Center of Parks
- Status: Open all year

The Zhongshan Park (simplified Chinese: 中山公园; traditional Chinese: 中山公園) was a former imperial altar and now a public park that lies just southwest of the Forbidden City in the Imperial City, Beijing.

Of all the gardens and parks surrounding the Forbidden City, such as the Beihai and Jingshan, Zhongshan is arguably the most centrally located of them all. The Zhongshan Park houses numerous pavilions, gardens, and imperial temples such as the Altar of Earth and Harvests or Altar of Land and Grain in some translations (Shejitan, 社稷坛), which was built in 1421 by the Yongle Emperor, and it symmetrically opposite the Imperial Ancestral Temple, and it's where the emperors of Ming and Qing dynasties made offerings to the gods of earth and agriculture. The altar consists of a square terrace in the centre of the park.

By 1914, the altar grounds had become a public park known as the "Central Park". That park was then renamed in 1928 after Sun Yat-Sen (Zhongshan Park), in memory of China's first revolutionary political leader who helped bring about the first republic era in 1911, which is what the park is known as today. Many parks in China during that period also took on this name (see Zhongshan Park).

The Zhongshan Park includes various halls and pavilions built for the members of the imperial family, stone archways and a greenhouse which houses fresh flowers on display all year round. The greenhouse includes 39 varieties of tulips presented to the park in 1977 by the Princess of Holland.

== Gallery ==
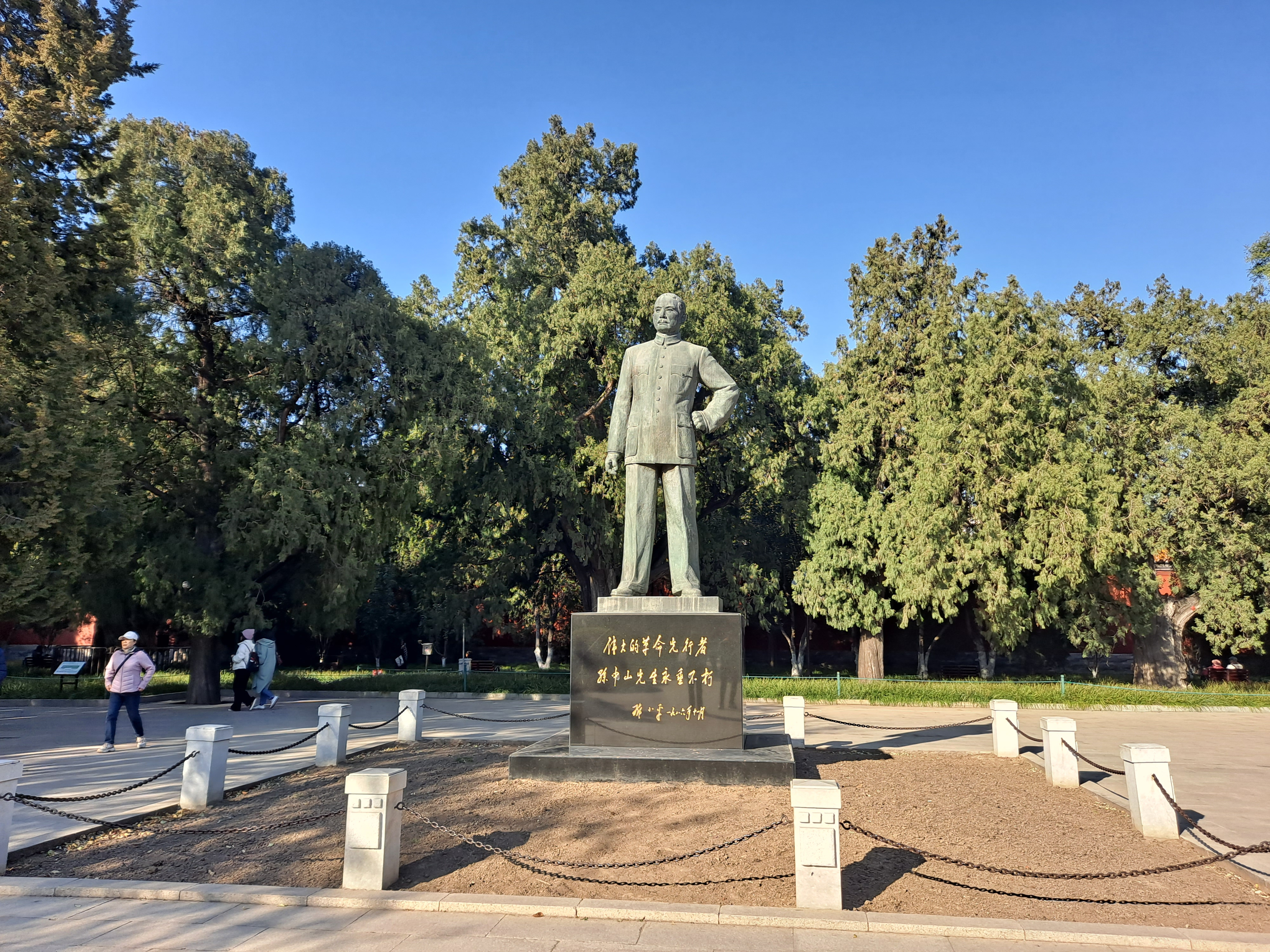
Statue of Sun Yat-Sen

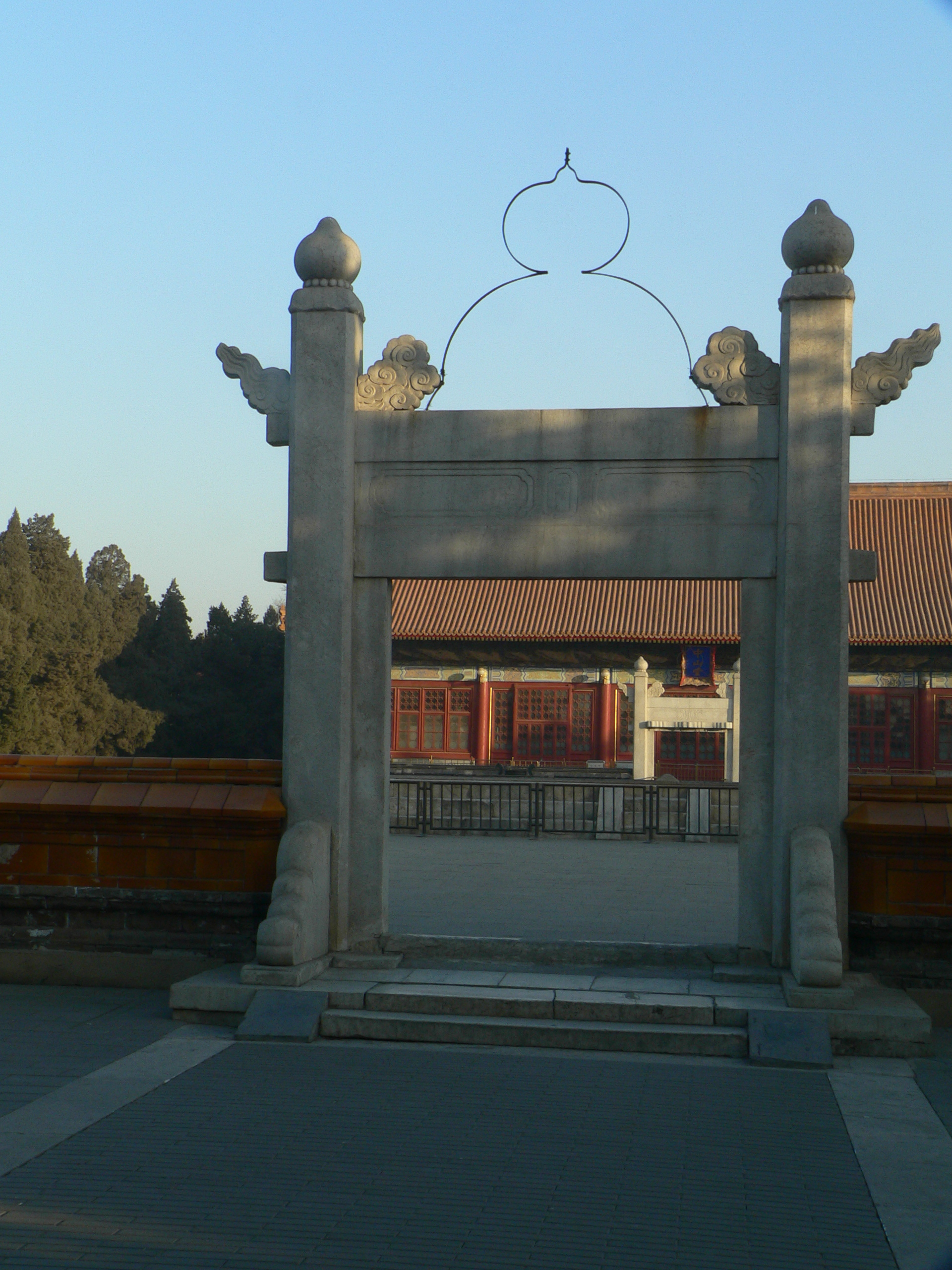
The Altar of Earth and Harvests

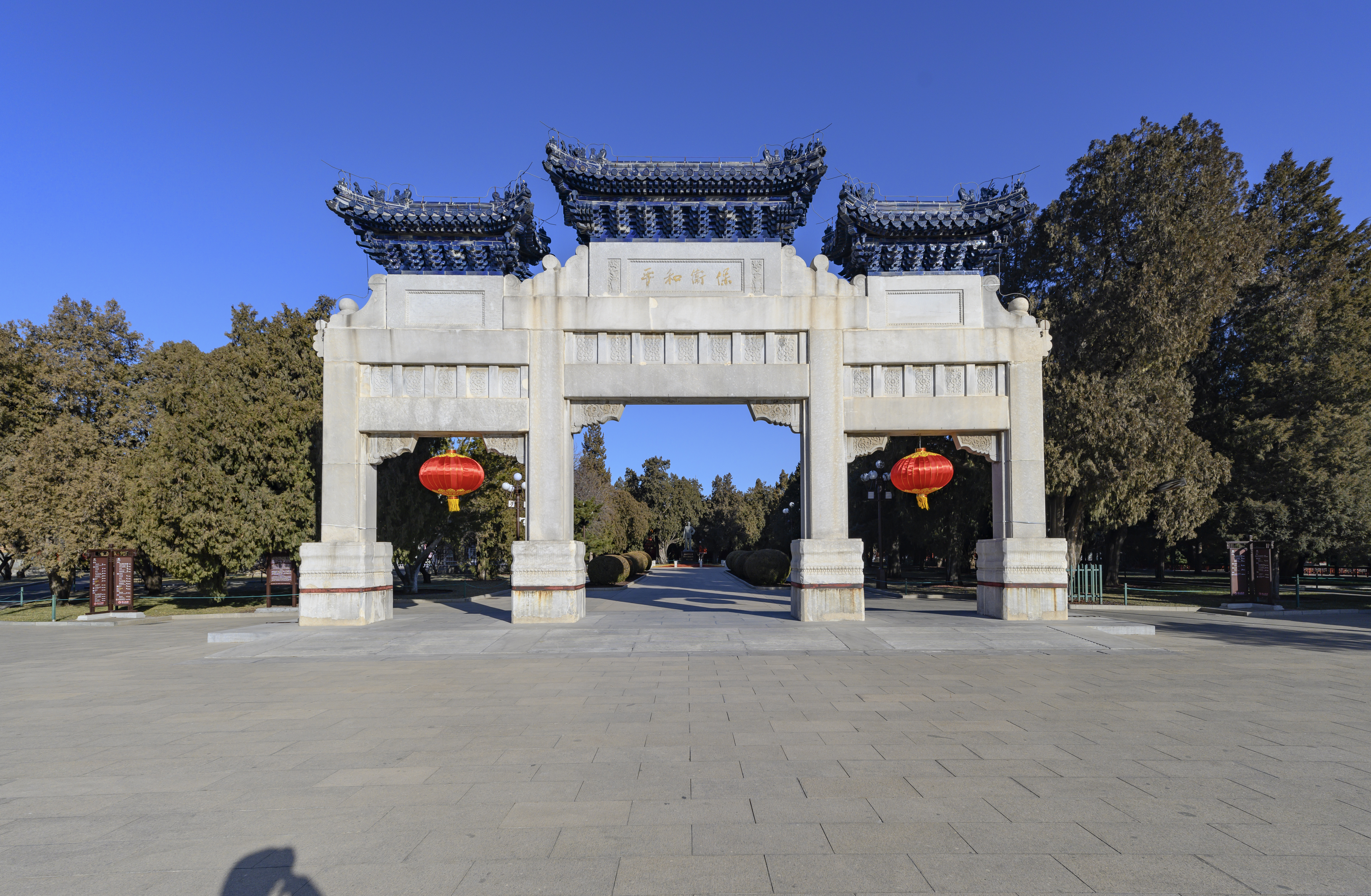
This stone archway was erected by the Chinese government (Qing) at the time to commemorate Baron von Kettler, killed during the Yihetuan Movement in 1900

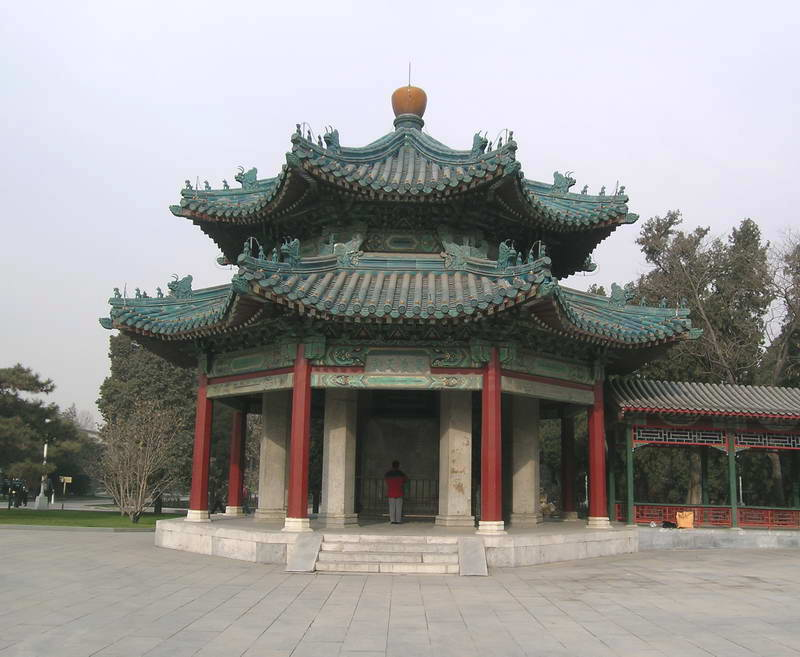

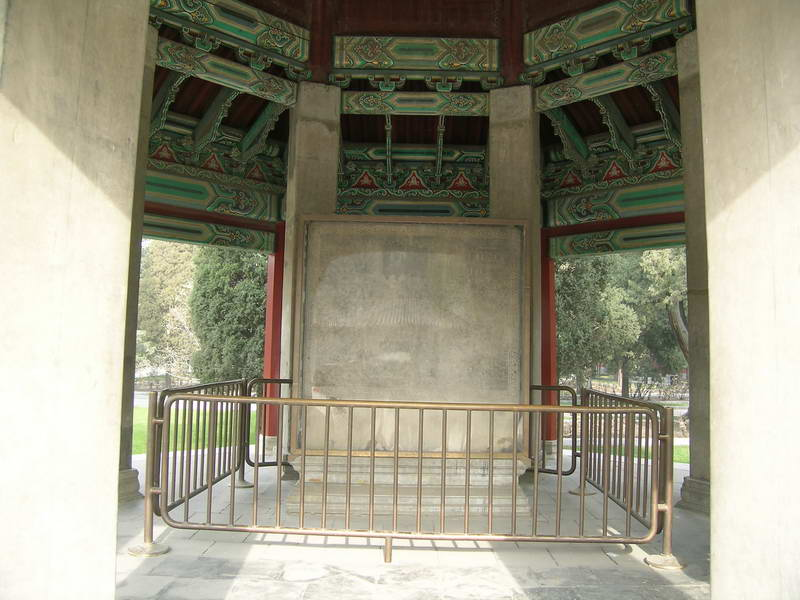

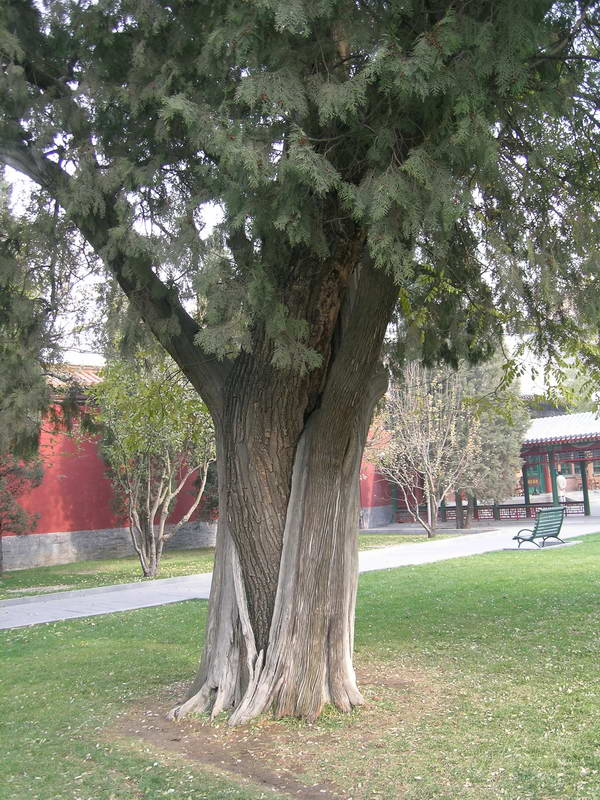

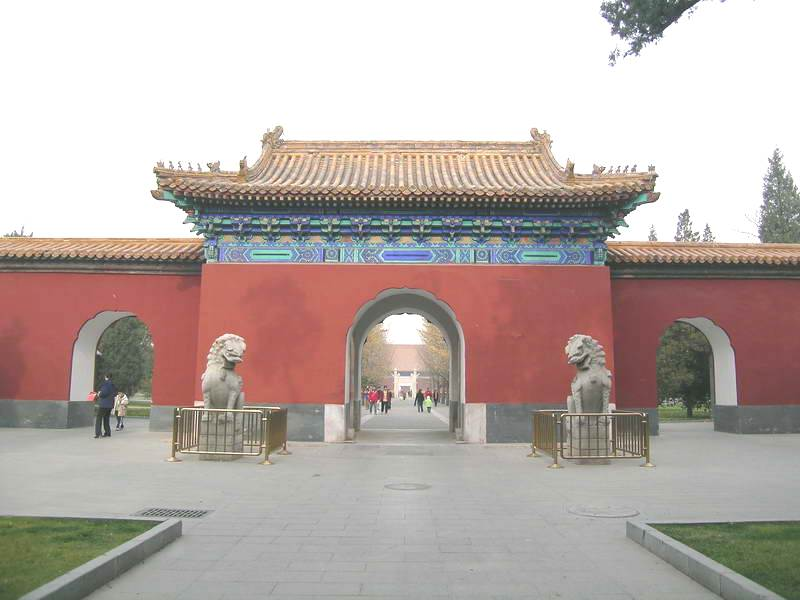
The south gate into the altar

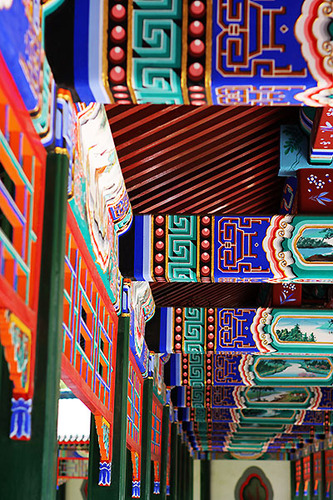

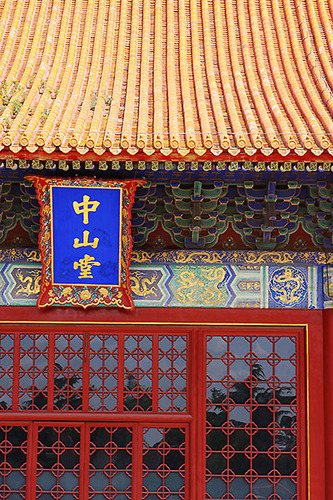
