= Tuancheng Fortress =

Chinese museum

Coordinates: 39.9852°N 116.204°E

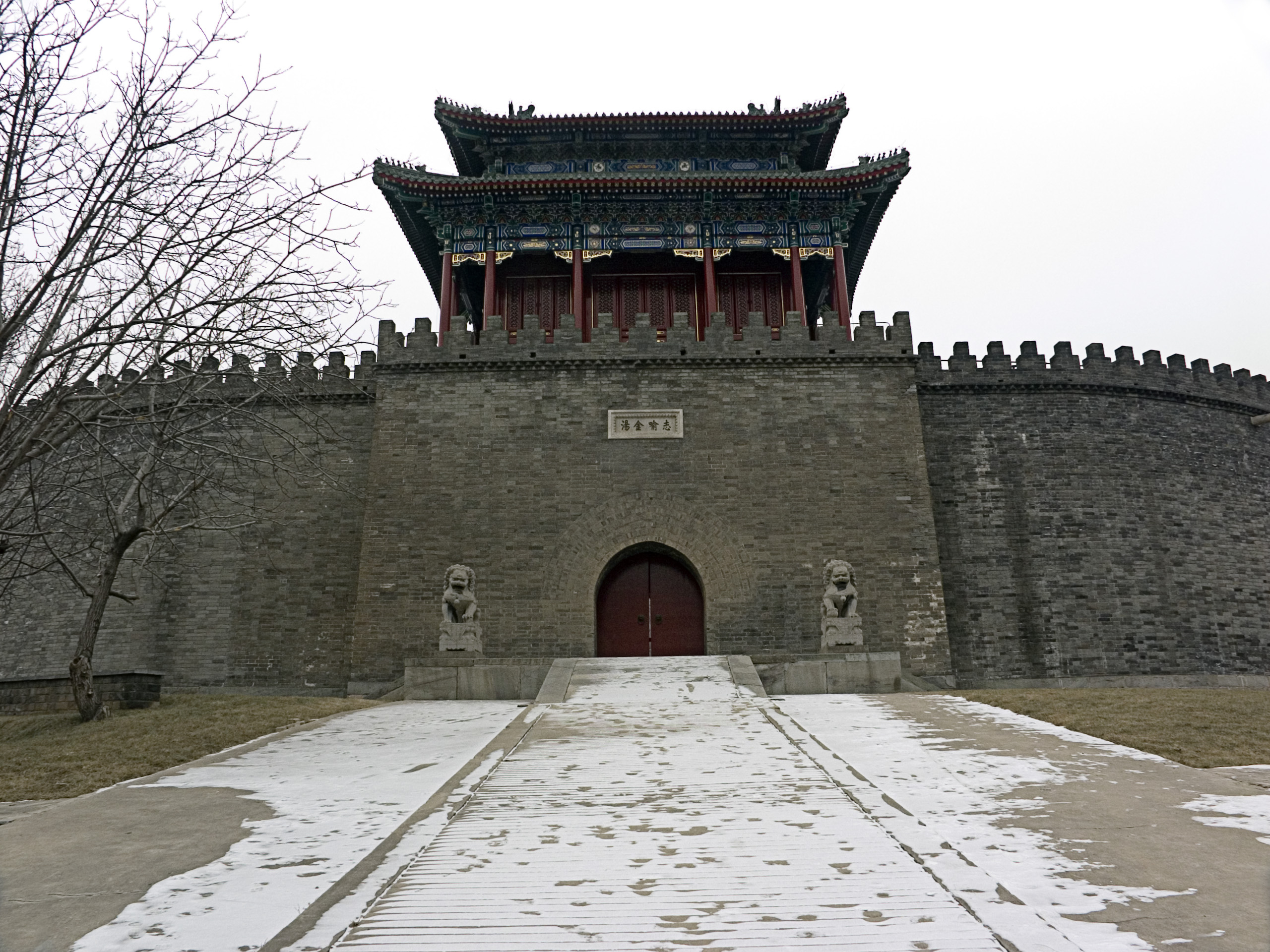
The north gate into the fortress

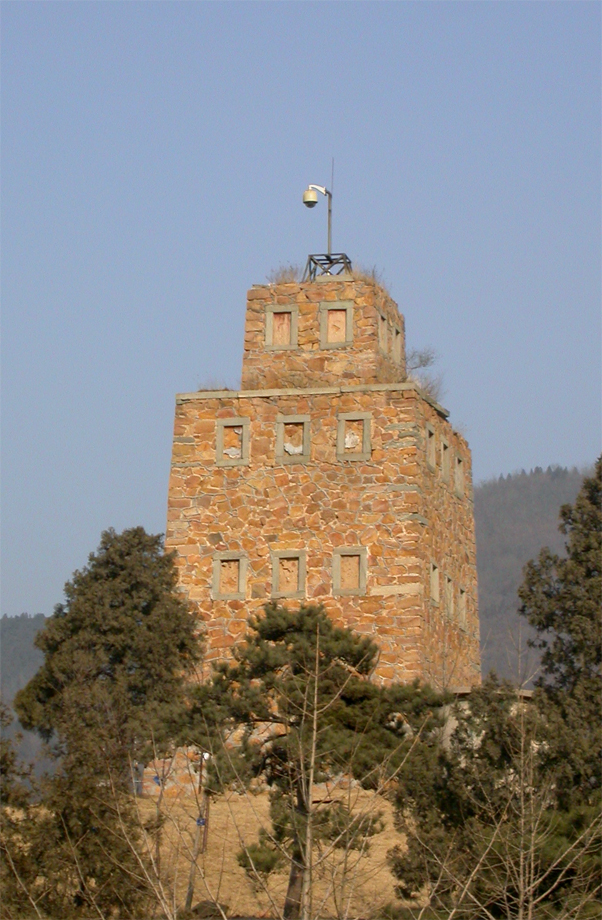
Tibetan tower house folly within Tuan Cheng Fortress

The Tuancheng Fortress or Tuan Cheng Fortress (Chinese: t 團城演武廳, s 团城演武厅, p Tuánchéng Yǎnwǔtīng, lit. "Round Wall Fortress") is a historic 18th-century fortress located near the Fragrant Hills in the Haidian District of Beijing, China. Today, the fortress is a national museum and is also known as the Tuancheng Exhibition Hall.

The fortress was built in the 14th year of the Qianlong Emperor's reign (1749 CE). Tuancheng was a castellated military training compound used by the Qing to train, inspect, and honor their troops.

The site is especially well preserved. Today, the fortress frequently holds large-scale martial arts events and attracts fans from all around China.
