= 祭 =

祭 may refer to:

- Generic festivals
- Matsuri (Japanese festivals, often religious)
- Jesa (祭祀)
- Sacrifice to Heaven (Chinese: 祭天; pinyin: Jìtiān)
