= Seonjamdan =

Confucian altar in Seoul, South Korea

- 선잠단지
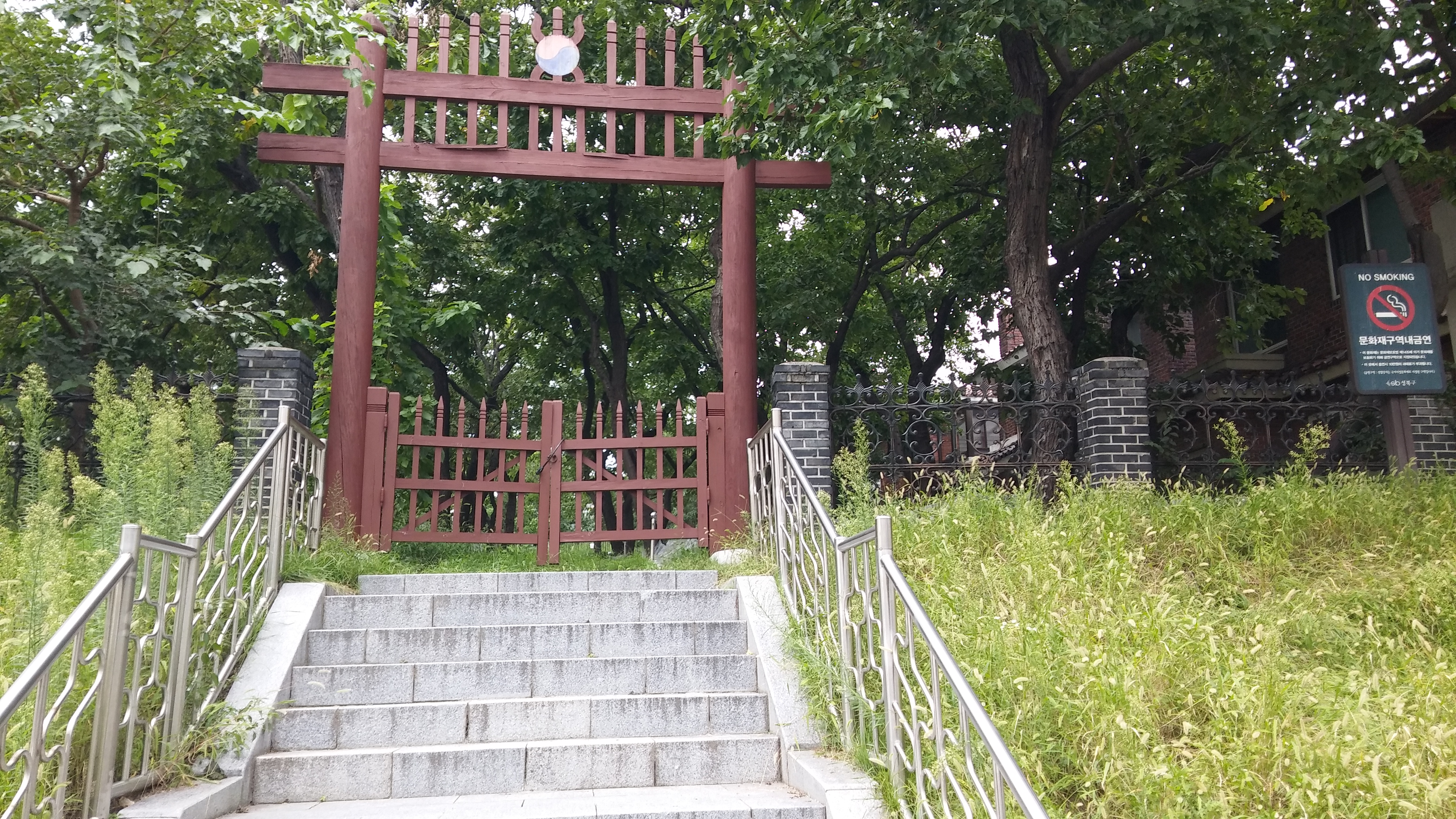
- Entrance to Seonjamdanji

Religion
- Affiliation: Korean Confucianism

Location
- Location: 64-1, Seongbuk-dong; Seongbuk-gu, Seoul, South Korea
- Interactive map of Seonjamdan
- Coordinates: 37.593778°N 126.999333°E
- Historic Sites of South Korea
- Official name: Seonjamdan Altar Site
- Designated: January 21, 1963

Korean name
- Hangul: 선잠단지
- Hanja: 先蠶壇址
- RR: Seonjamdanji
- MR: Sŏnjamdanji

Seonjamdan (Korean: 선잠단지; Hanja: 先蠶壇址) is a Confucian altar site located in Seongbuk-dong, Seongbuk District, Seoul, South Korea. The site served as the location for two altars built during the Joseon dynasty for silkworm rituals.

== History ==
The first Seonjamdan was constructed sometime between the reign of King Taejo and the lunar calendar year of 1414. To comply with the Liji which required ritual silkworm breeding ceremonies to be performed in a northern suburb, Seonjamdan was located to the northeast of Hanyang in Seongbuk-dong. In 1749, King Yeongjo had a second altar constructed as a replacement for the first one.

Following the Korean Empire's loss of diplomatic sovereignty to Japan, the ancestral tablets enshrined at Seonjamdan were relocated to Sajikdan in 1908. The site was then damaged by Japanese authorities and abandoned for three decades while the local town repurposed it as a public space. On October 19, 1939, Japanese authorities designated Seonjamdan as historical site. In 1961, a portion of Seonjamdan's protected area was decreased to accommodate new road construction; the altar itself was also expanded and rebuilt.

Seonjamdan was designated a historic site by the South Korean government on January 21, 1963.

== See also ==
- Hwangudan, Seoul
- Sajikdan, Seoul
- Xiancantan, Beijing
