= Hwangudan =

Imperial shrine in Seoul, South Korea

Coordinates: 37°33′54.19″N 126°58′47.46″E

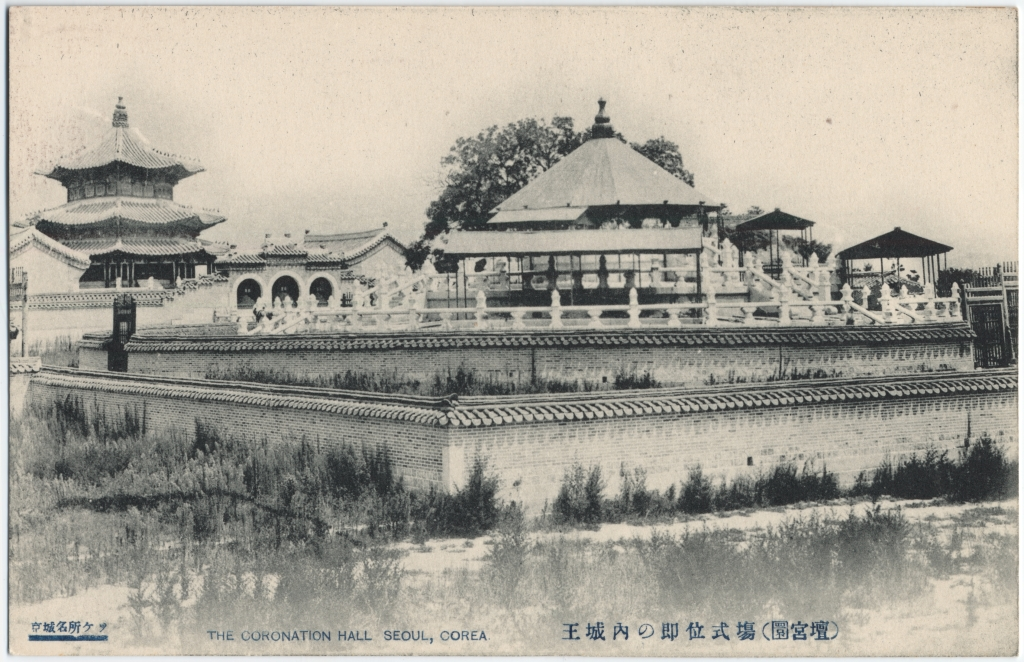
- The two original main buildings. Coronation hall before destruction (right of center) and Hwanggungu (left), the latter of which still stands today (c. 1904)
- Interactive map of the Hwangudan area

General information
- Location: 112, Sogong-ro, Jung District, Seoul, South Korea
- Years built: 1897 (Coronation hall); 1899 (Hwanggungu)
- Inaugurated: October 11, 1897

Design and construction
- Designations

Historic Sites of South Korea
- Official name: Hwangudan Altar
- Designated: 1967-07-15
- Reference no.: 157

Korean name
- Hangul: 환구단
- Hanja: 圜丘壇
- RR: Hwangudan
- MR: Hwan'gudan

Hwangudan (Korean: 환구단; Hanja: 圜丘壇) was a shrine complex that still partially stands in Jung District, Seoul, South Korea. The complex consisted of two main buildings: a coronation site and Hwanggungu (황궁우; 皇穹宇; lit. 'Imperial Vault of Heaven'). The coronation site was built in late 1897 and destroyed in 1913. Hwanggungu was built in 1899 and still stands today.

The coronation site was built as the site of King Gojong's ritual declaration of the Korean Empire. Upon his ascendency, Gojong performed the Rite of Heaven, a ritual that had not been performed by a Korean monarch for hundreds of years. The ritual was normally reserved for Sons of Heaven, but Korea had been a tributary state to China for centuries.

The coronation site was demolished by the Japanese colonial government and replaced with the Josun Railway Hotel (조선철도호텔). The Josun Hotel's successor, the Josun Hotel & Resort, still stands on the location of the hall, with Hwanggungu nearby.

Hwangudan was designated South Korea's Historic Site No. 157 on July 15, 1967, but it is still relatively unknown to both locals and tourists. The complex has gone by a number of other names, including Wongudan (원구단; 圜丘壇), Jecheondan (제천단; 祭天壇) and Wondan (원단; 圜壇).

== History ==
=== Background ===
Korean monarchs of the Three Kingdoms and Goryeo periods have historically made sacrifices to heaven across the peninsula. The practice was Confucianized with the adoption of the round altar ritual by Seongjong of Goryeo in 983. The round altar ritual was restricted to Sons of Heaven. Goryeo monarchs sacrificed to heaven until 1385, even during the period of Mongol rule. King Sejo of Joseon briefly restarted the rite at a location elsewhere in Seoul, but stopped the practice in the tenth year of his reign in 1464 because the rite could only be performed by the Son of Heaven, and Joseon was a tributary state to Ming.

=== Creation ===
In 1897, the main coronation site of Hwangudan was constructed by around a thousand workers in ten days. It was constructed on the site of a former reception hall that was used to entertain Chinese ambassadors. It was made in preparation for the establishment of the Korean Empire, which Gojong, the monarch of Joseon, established after Qing (China) ceased to be Korea's suzerain.

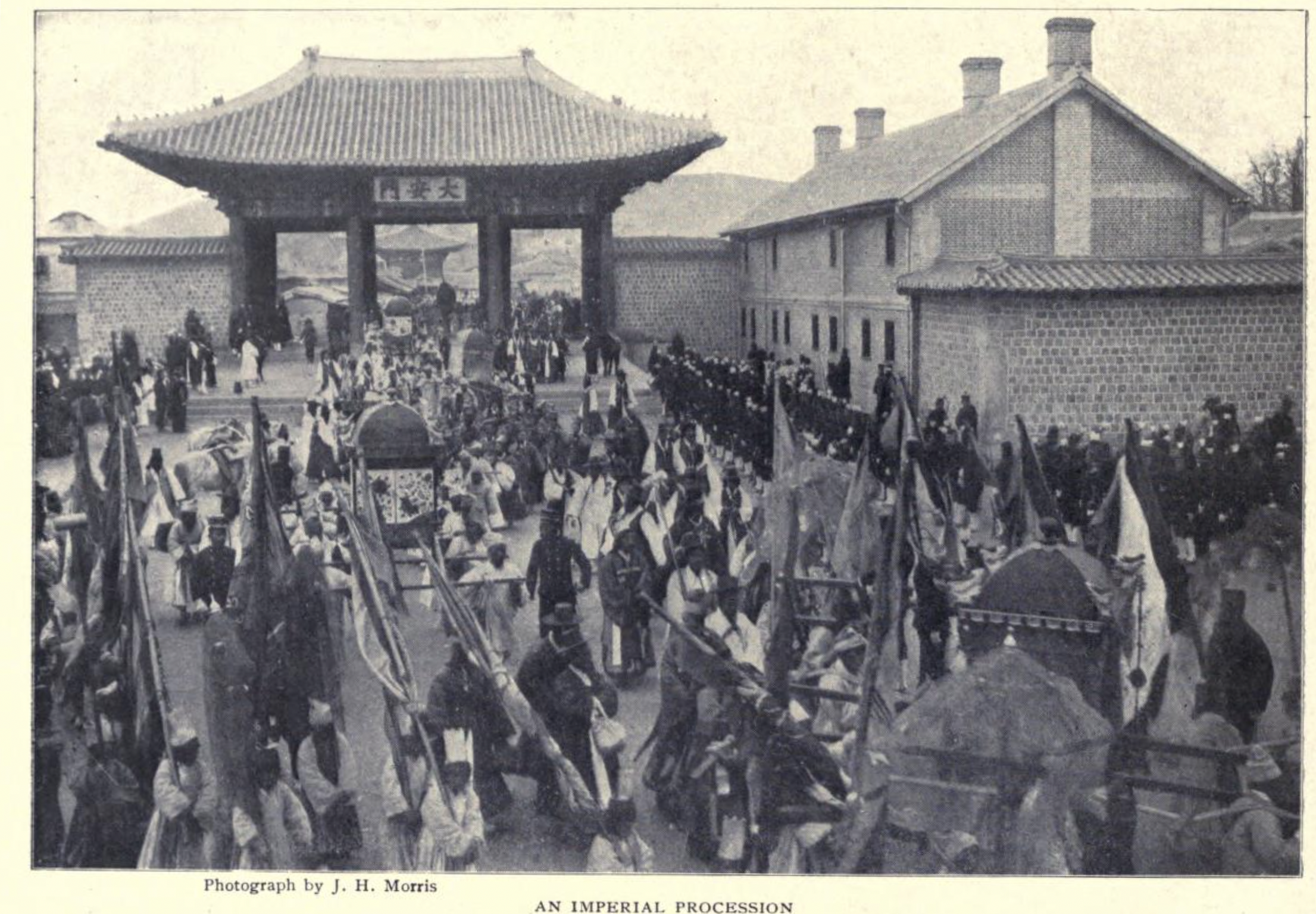
An imperial procession departing from Deoksugung (1899)

In preparation to ascend the throne, on October 11, 1897, King Gojong began to perform the full sacrificial rites for the first time in centuries. The historic Korean newspaper The Independent published the following about the occasion: (Note: "십일일 밤 장안의 사가와 각 전에서는 등불을 밝게 달아 길들이 낮과 같이 밝았다. 가을 달 또한 밝은 빛을 검정 구름 틈으로 내려 비쳤다. 집집마다 태극 국기를 높이 걸어 애국심을 표하였고, 각 대대 병정들과 각처 순검들이 만일에 대비하여 절도있게 파수하였다. 길에 다니던 사람들도 즐거운 표정이었다. 십이일 새벽에 공교히 비가 왔다. 의복들이 젖고 찬기운이 성하였다. 그러나 국가의 경사를 즐거워하는 마음에 젖은 옷과 추위를 개의치 않고 질서 정연히 각자의 직무를 착실히 하였다. 십일일 오후 두시 반 경운궁에서 시작하여 환구단까지 길가 좌우로 각 대대 군사들이 질서정연하게 배치되었다. 순검들도 몇백 명이 틈틈이 벌려 서서 황국의 위엄을 나타냈다. 좌우로 휘장을 쳐 잡인 왕래를 금하였고 옛적에 쓰던 의장등물을 고쳐 황색으로 만들어 호위하게 하였다. 시위대 군사들이 어가를 호위하고 지나갈 때에는 위엄이 웅장했다. 총끝에 꽂힌 창들이 석양에 빛을 반사하여 빛났다. 육군장관들은 금수로 장식한 모자와 복장을 하였고, 허리에는 금줄로 연결된 은빛의 군도를 찼다. 옛 풍속으로 조선군복을 입은 관원들도 있었으며 금관조복한 관인들도 많이 있었다. 어가 앞에는 대황제의 태극국기가 먼저 지나갔고, 대황제는 황룡포에 면류관을 쓰고 금으로 채색한 연을 탔다. 그 뒤에 황태자가 홍룡포를 입고 면류관을 쓴 채 붉은 연을 타고 지나갔다. 어가가 환구단에 이르자 제향에 쓸 각색 물건을 둘러보고 오후 네시쯤 환어하였다. [...] 십이일 오전 두시 다시 위의를 갖추어 황단에 가서 하느님께 제사하고 황제위에 나아감을 고했다... 광무 원년 시월 십이일은 조선사기에서 몇 만년을 지내더라도 제일 빛나고 영화로운 날이 될지라... 그날부터는 조선이 다만 자주독립국뿐이 아니라 자주독립한 대황제국이 되었으니...어찌 조선인민이 되어…감격한 생각이 아니 나리오")

Beginning at 2:30 p.m. on the 11th, battalions of soldiers were tightly arranged on each side of the road from Gyeongunggung (Deoksugung) to Hwangudan. [...] First came the flag of the Korean Empire, and the Great Emperor followed wearing a golden dragon robe, a crown, and flying a golden kite. Behind him was the Crown Prince, wearing a red dragon robe and crown, and flying a red kite. After arriving at Hwangudan, they inspected the many-colored objects to be used for the ceremony, and returned to the palace around 4 p.m... [It rained heavily on the morning of the twelfth, but people faithfully performed their duties]. At 2 a.m. on the 12th, the Emperor arrived at the shrine again in high spirits, performed jesa to heaven, and announced his ascendency to the imperial throne.

[This day] will be remembered as the brightest and most glorious for Joseon for tens of thousands of years... From this day, Joseon becomes not only an independent country, but an independent Great Empire... Oh, to be a citizen of Joseon... Is this not a moving thought?

— The Independent, October 14, 1897

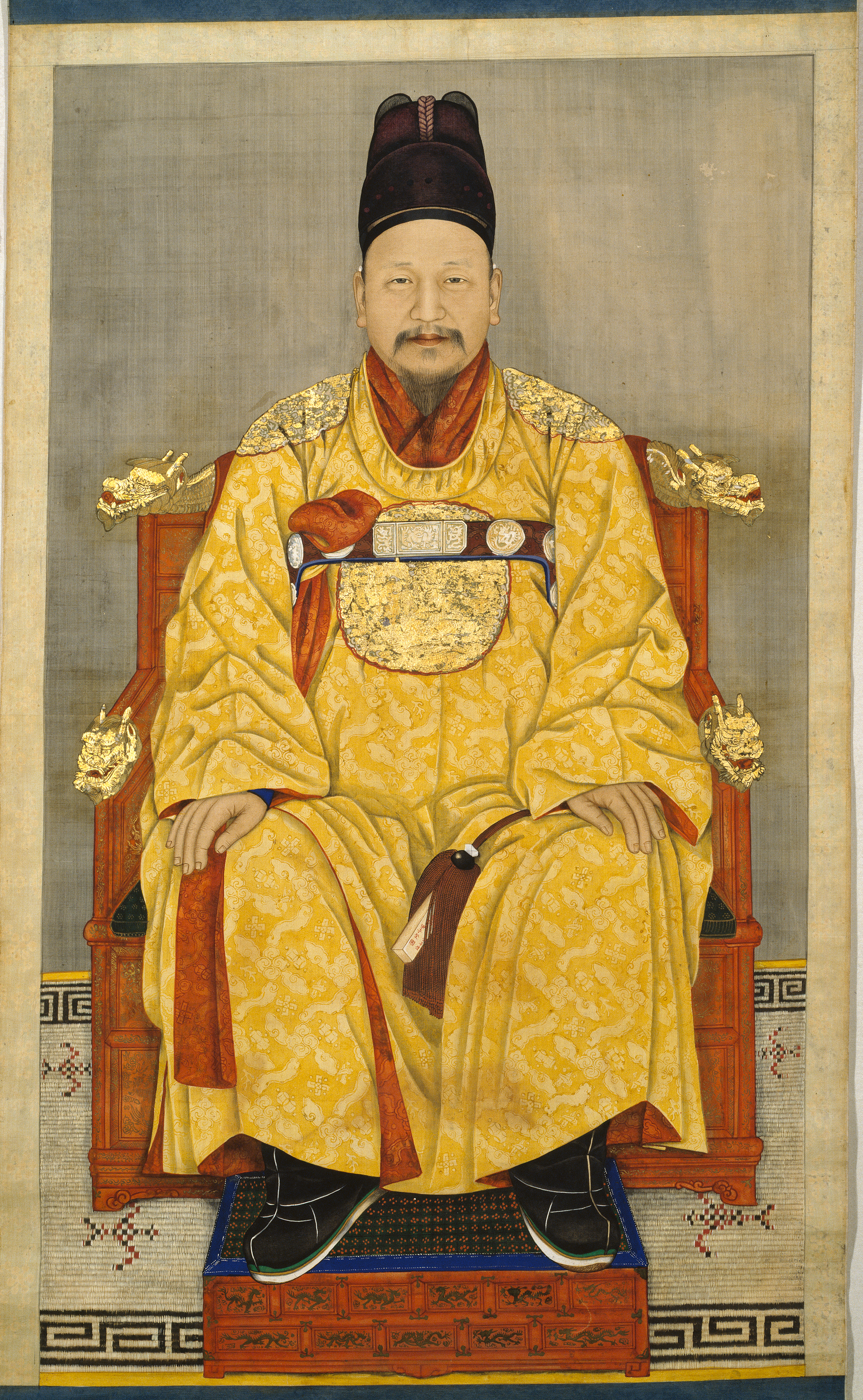
Portrait of Gojong wearing golden dragon robes

The King and Crown Prince were each carried in a golden throne by around fifty men. According to Yun, the ceremony concluded at around 5 a.m. That day, preparations began for another ceremony at the shrine for the posthumous elevation of Queen Min to Empress Myeongseong.

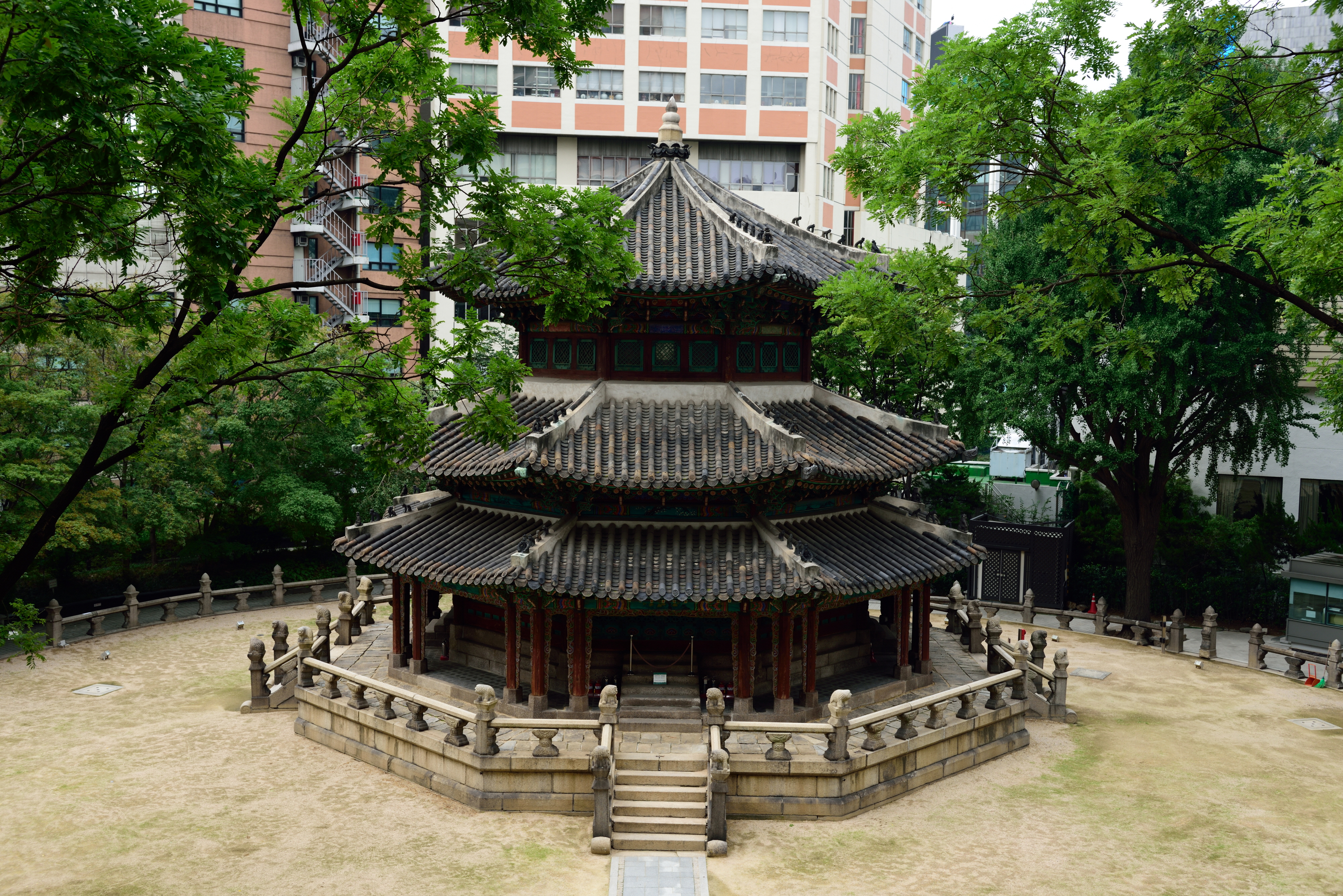
Hwanggungu, the only major building of the complex still standing (2015)

In 1899, the building Hwanggungu was created to commemorate Taejo, the founder of the Joseon dynasty. Stone memorial tablets (신위판; 神位版) dedicated to the god of heaven, god of the sea, and god of the moon were said to be kept there.

=== Japanese colonial period ===
Despite the celebrations, Korea was only nominally independent; it was then quickly drifting under the influence of the Empire of Japan, which eventually formally colonized it in 1910. The coronation site was demolished in 1913 and replaced with the Josun Railway Hotel the following year. This left only the Hwanggungu standing.

=== Recent history ===
After the liberation of Korea in 1945, Hwanggungu was largely forgotten about, and is still relatively unknown today. In 1960, the main gate to Hwangudan was removed to make way for a Josun Hotel construction project, and placed near another hotel in Ui-dong. It was largely forgotten about there, until it was later discovered that it once belonged to Hwangudan and moved back to its original spot in 2007. Hwangudan was designated South Korea's Historic Site No. 157 on July 15, 1967.

The site has gone by a number of other names over time, including Wongudan (원구단; 圜丘壇), Jecheondan (제천단; 祭天壇) and Wondan (원단; 圜壇). However, since 2005, the government-preferred name for the shrine has been Hwangudan.

Hwangudan was repaired from 2015 to 2017. Entrance into Hwangudan by tourists used to be allowed, but is now prohibited as of 2018.

In 2017, a reenactment of Gojong's coronation ceremony was held on its 120th anniversary in Deoksugung and Seoul Plaza. The coronation site was recreated in a different location for the ceremony. As a symbolic gesture, civilians were invited to audition for various roles in the ceremony, and were selected to play officials, guards, palanquin bearers, and the imperial family.

== Architecture ==
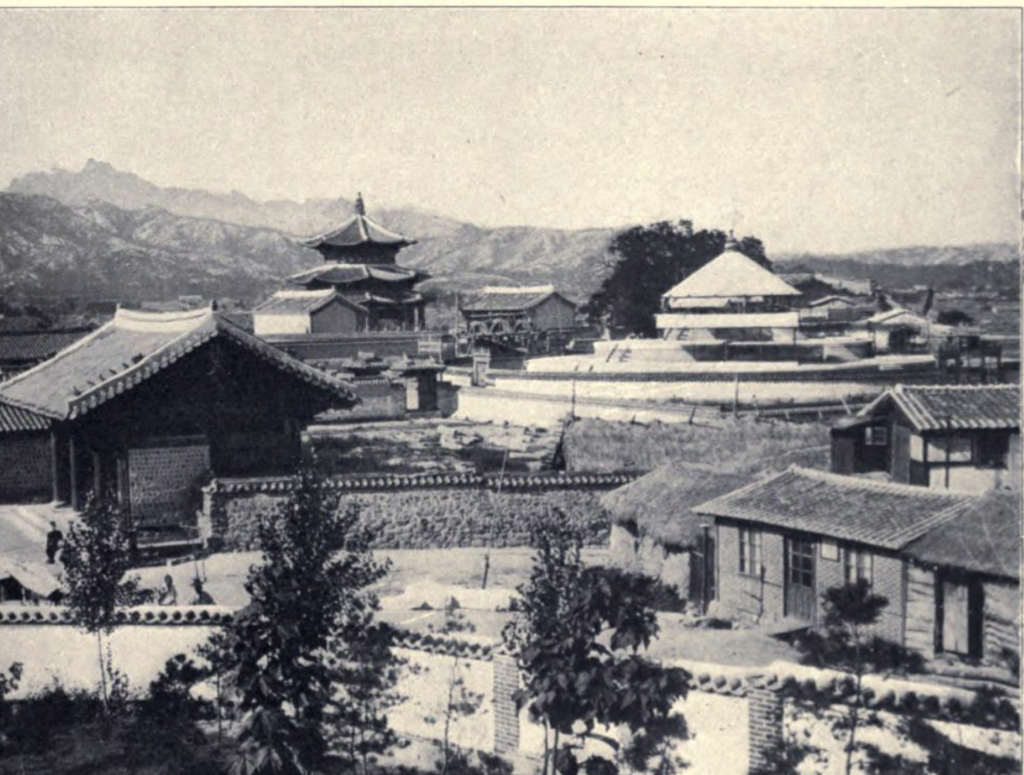
In this photo published by American traveler Burton Holmes, the platforms of the coronation site are more clearly visible. (1899)

Hwangudan's design was heavily inspired by the Temple of Heaven in Beijing. The coronation site consisted of three progressively smaller platforms with a golden awning over the top platform and a granite wall surrounding the lowest. The bottom floor was around 144 cheok (unit very close to a foot. Around 48 meters) in diameter, the middle 72 cheok (24 m), and the top 36 cheok (12 m). The lower two platforms each had nine steps that led up to the next one. The overall structure was designed by Sim Ui-seok. A scale model of the building was on display at the Seoul Museum of History in 2017.

Hwanggungu is a three-storied octagonal shrine north of the main hall.

Several other smaller structures and relics still exist in the area. The original gate and main gate leading to Hwanggungu are original, although the main gate was moved away and back to its current spot. In addition, three stone drums (석고단; 石鼓壇; Seokgodan) that feature dragon decorations are nearby Hwanggungu. These drums were made in 1902 to commemorate the 40th anniversary of Gojong's reign.

== Gallery ==
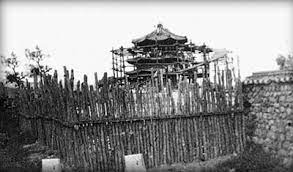
Hwanggungu being constructed (1899)

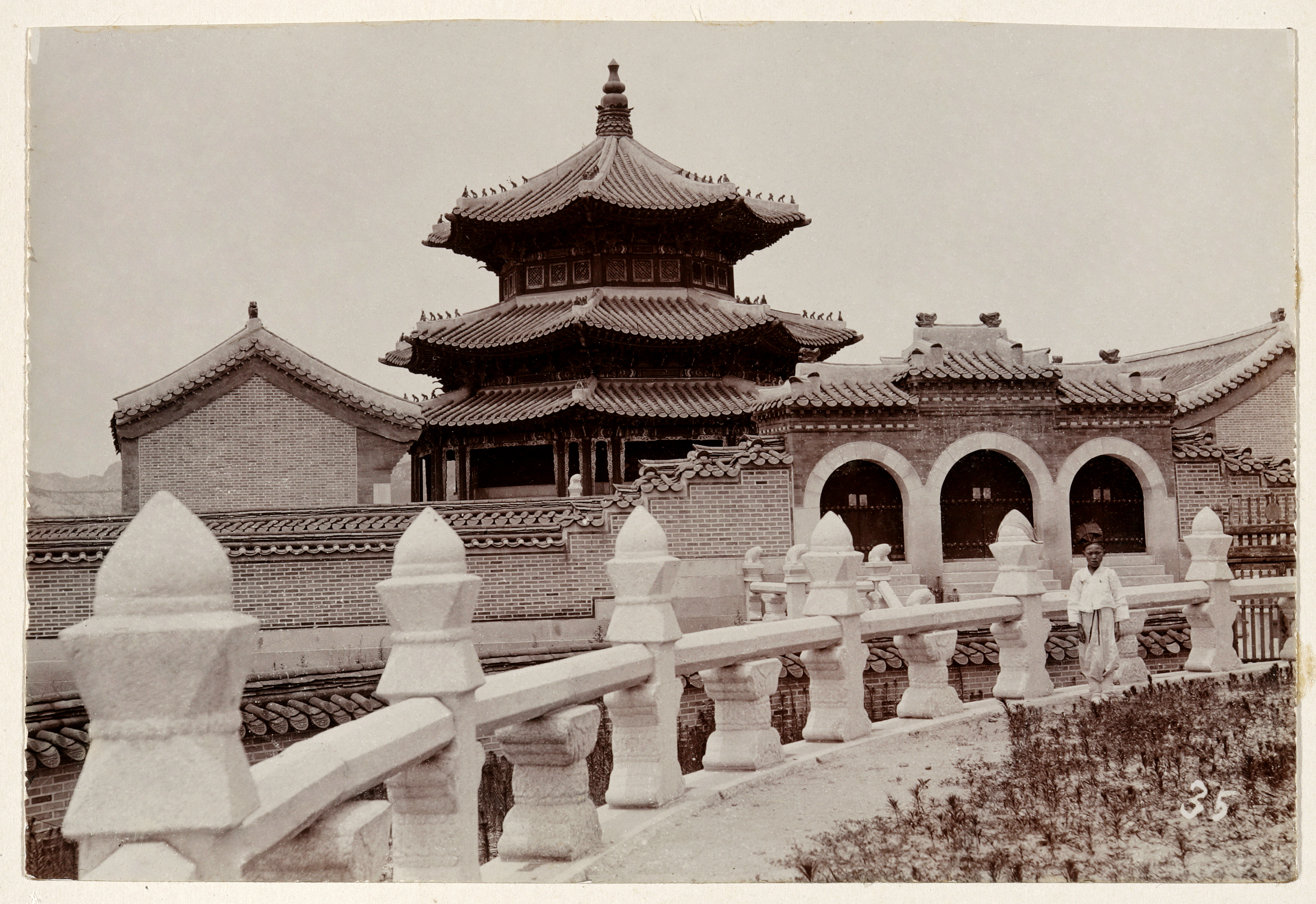
Hwanggungu (1906)

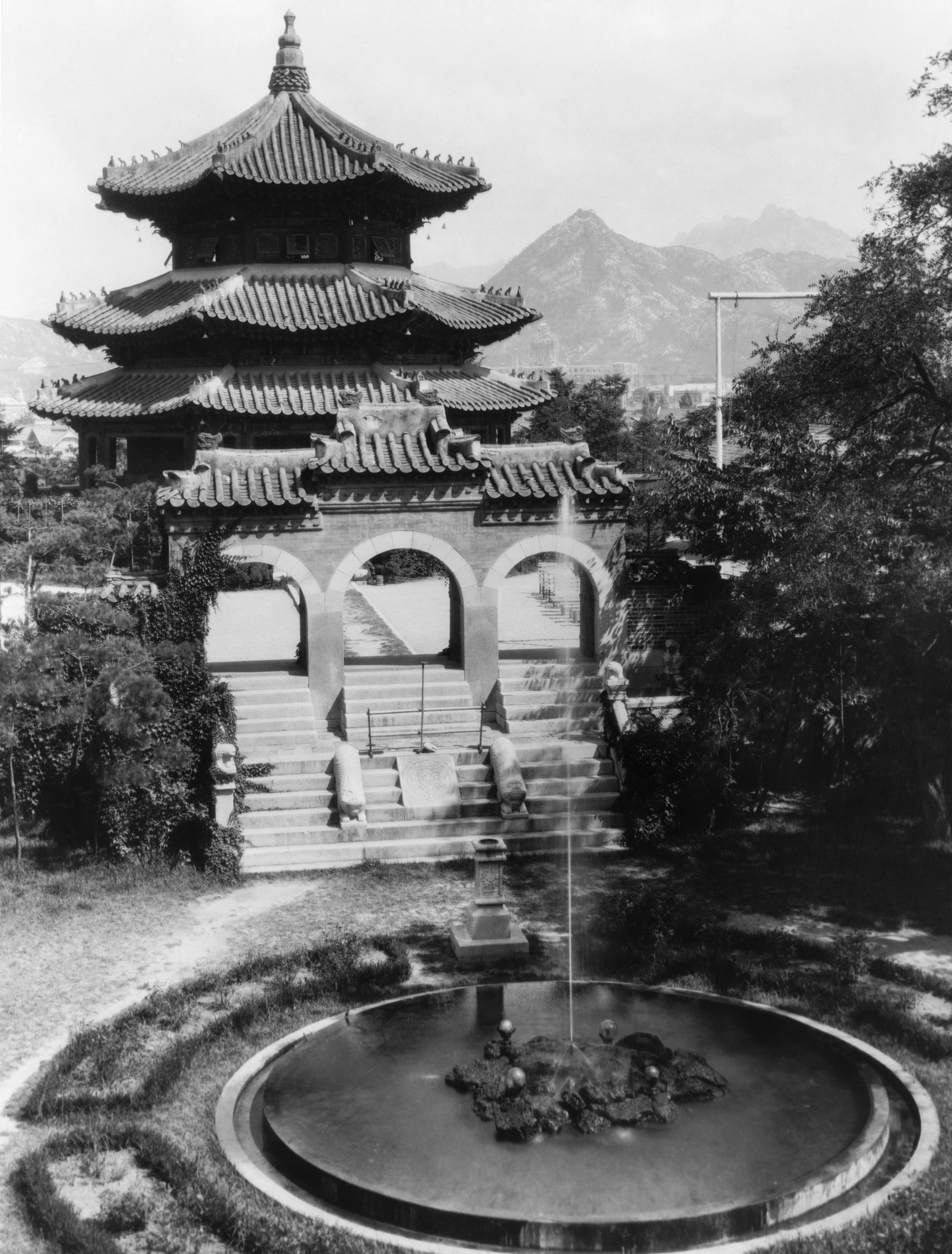
Hwanggungu (1925)

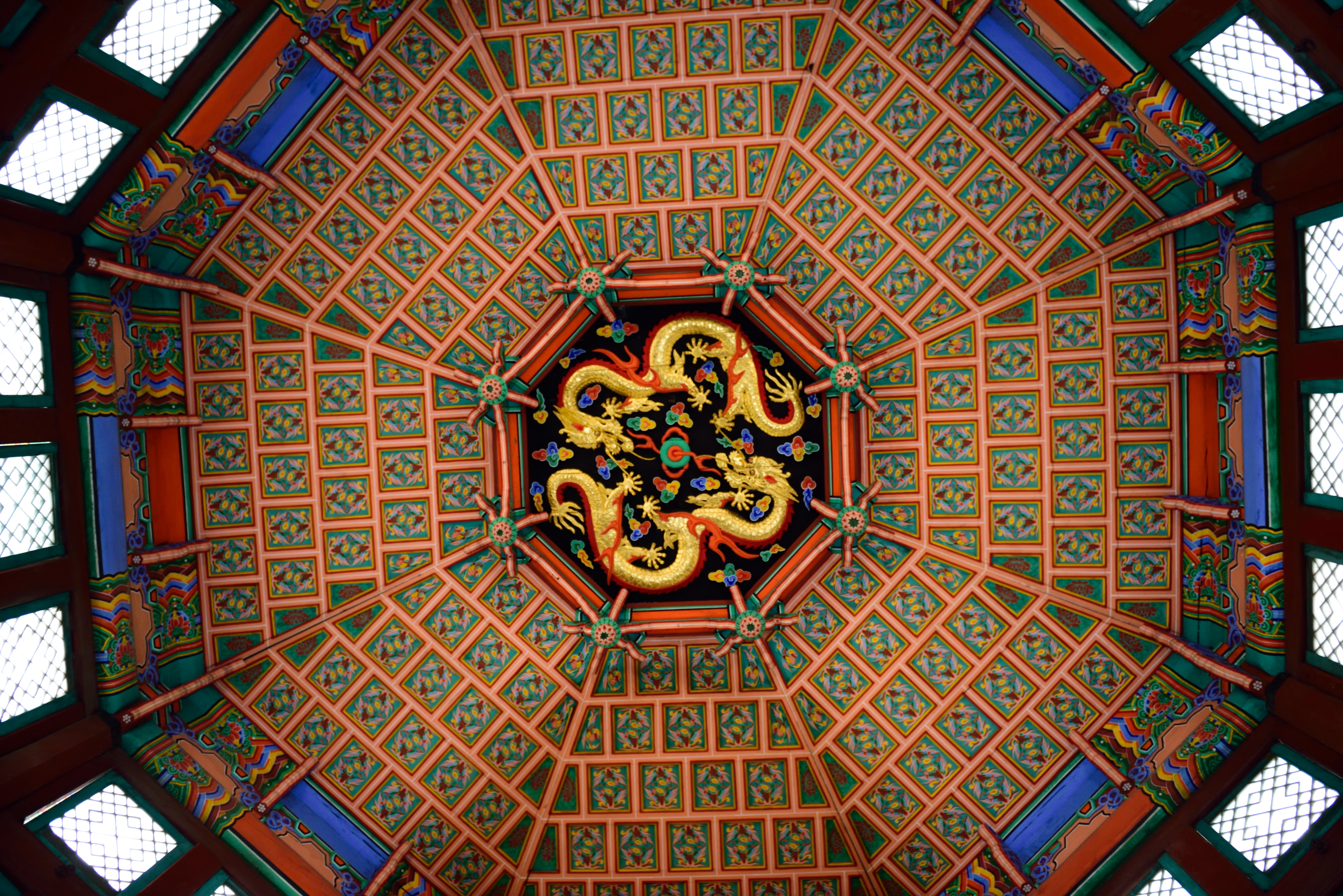
The ceiling of Hwanggungu (2015)

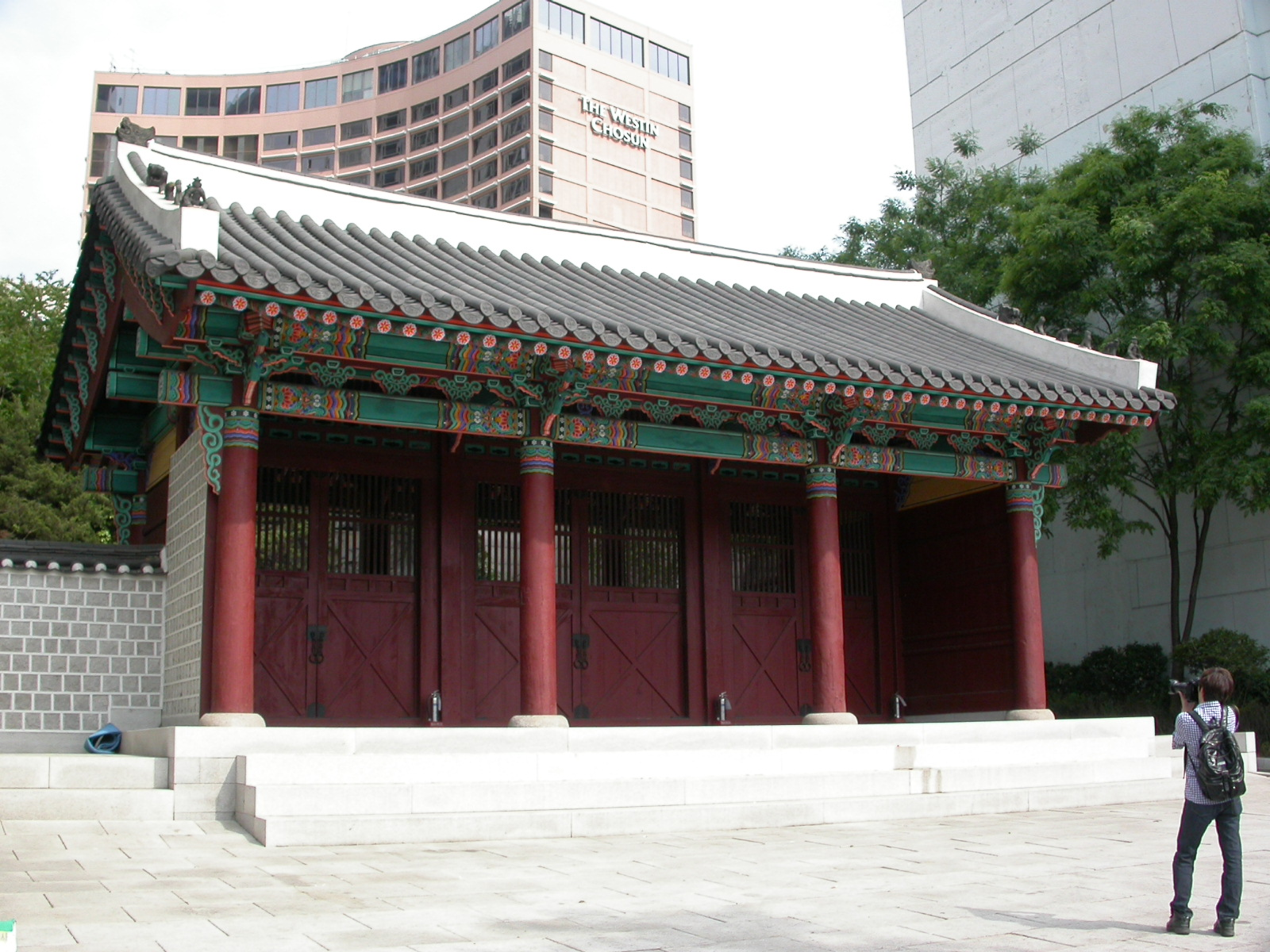
Restored main entrance into the complex, Josun Hotel seen in background (2011)

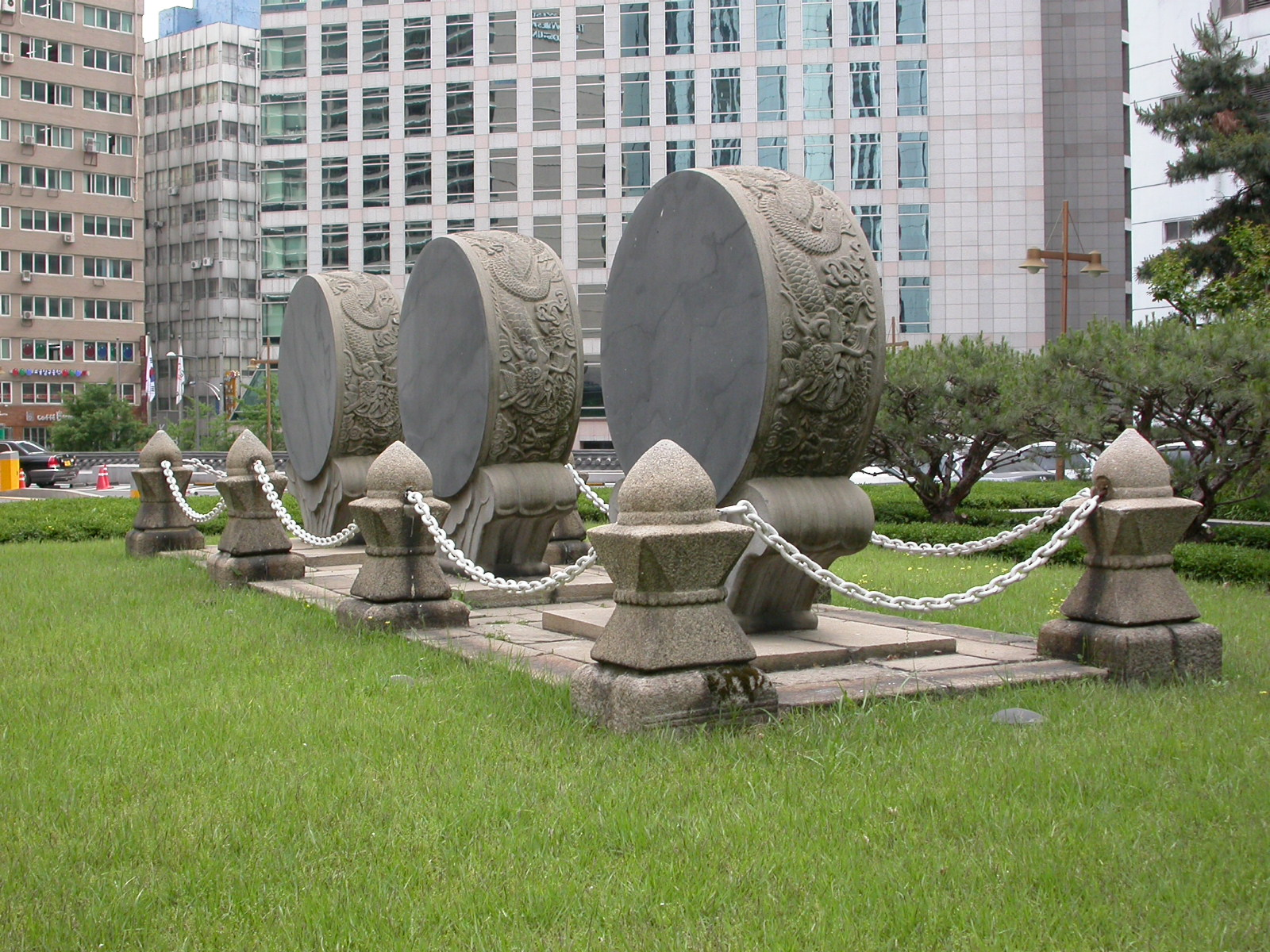
The stone drums (2011)

== See also ==
- Sajikdan, a Neo-Confucian altar in Seoul
- Chamseongdan, another altar on Ganghwa Island for similar rites
- Temple of Heaven in Beijing
