= Sajikdan =

Neo-Confucian altar in Seoul, South Korea

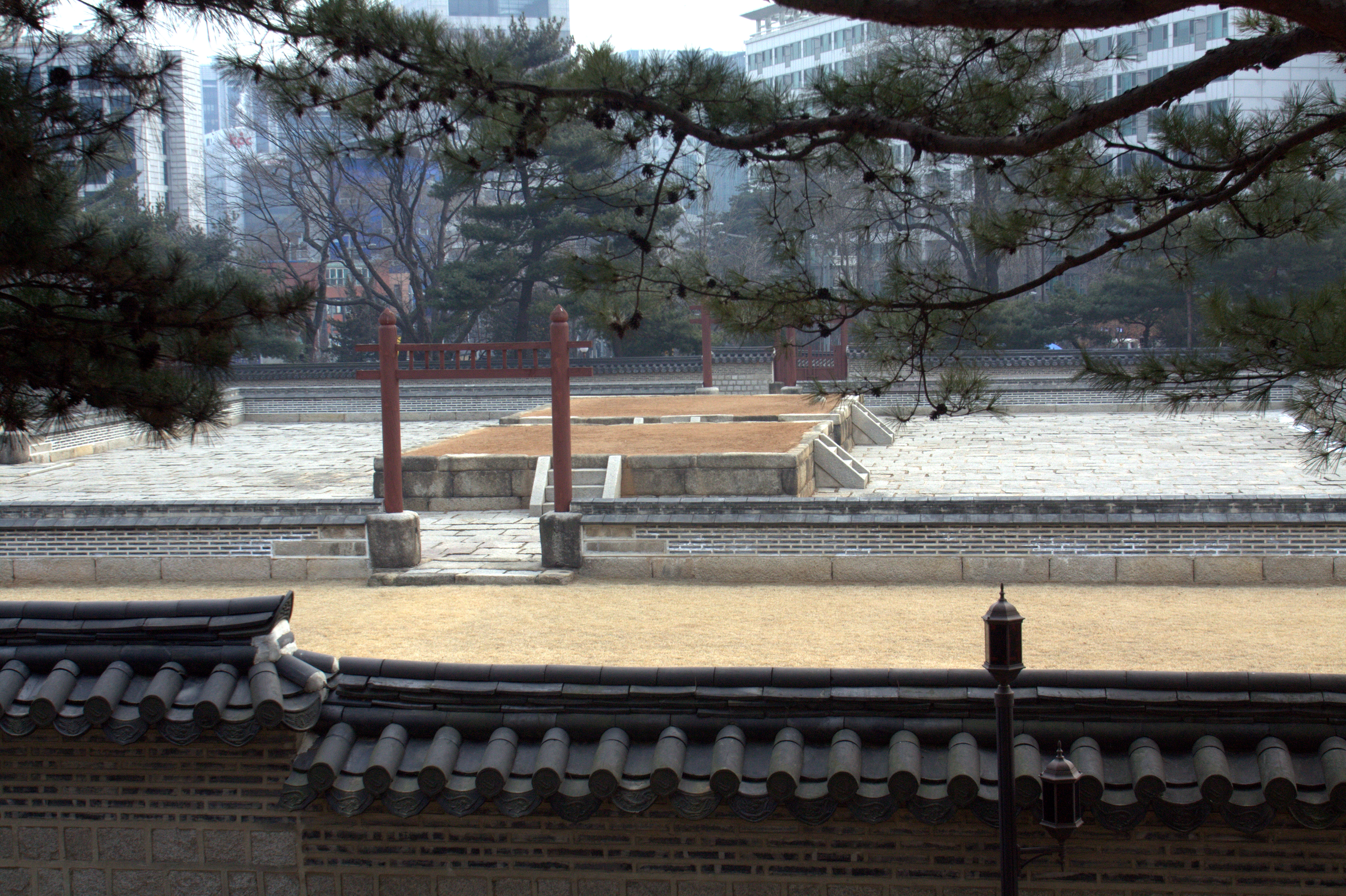
- The shrine in 2014

Religion
- Affiliation: Korean Confucianism

Location
- Location: Seoul, South Korea
- Interactive map of Sajikdan
- Coordinates: 37.5757°N 126.9677°E

Architecture
- Established: 1395
- Historic Sites of South Korea
- Official name: Sajikdan Altar
- Designated: 1963-01-21
- Reference no.: 121

Korean name
- Hangul: 사직단
- Hanja: 社稷壇
- RR: Sajikdan
- MR: Sajiktan

Sajikdan (Korean: 사직단; Hanja: 社稷壇) is a Neo-Confucian altar located in Sajik-dong, Jongno District, Seoul, South Korea. It was built and used during the Joseon period to perform rituals related to soil and grain.

== Description ==
When Seoul was founded during the Joseon period, the location of Sajikdan was prescribed by the ritual bureaucratic text Rites of Zhou. The shrine was created in 1395. Along with the royal palace Gyeongbokgung and the shrine Jongmyo, Sajikdan is a fundamental symbol of the new capital city.

On this square altar were honored on key moments of the lunar calendar the national deities of earth (Sa) and grains (Jik).

Certain ceremonies have been recently revived in the square altars.

== See also ==
- Hwangudan, a separate altar in Seoul
- Esplanade of Sacrifice to the Heaven and Earth, Huế, Vietnam
- Shejitan, Beijing
