= Jangnye =

Korean funerary rites

- Hangul: 장례
- Hanja: 葬禮
- RR: jangnye
- MR: changnye

Jangnye (Korean: 장례) refers to Korean funerary rites.

== Procedures ==
Generally, jangnye is performed for three days and nights. If a person is dead, the body will be laid in a coffin after two days and buried during the morning of the third day. Before laying the body in a coffin, a person dealing with the body cleans it and puts on the grave clothes made of hemp. In Korea, it is common for a person in their sixties to prepare grave clothes.

Condolers pay a visit to a bereaved family; a chief mourner expresses his sorrow by Gok, which is similar to crying.

Usually in the morning of the third day, the bereaved family head for their family burial mountain. They dig the ground, put the coffin in it, and build a mound over the grave. It comes to an end with jesa, which is a Korean traditional memorial service. The jangnye ceremony is usually held as a burial instead of a cremation. It comes from the Confucian idea that one should not impair the ancestor's bodies but preserve them.

== Elements affecting jangnye ==
Jangnye has evolved since its formation. It was a burial ceremony in the era of Three Kingdoms and has changed into a cremation influenced by Buddhism in Goryeo dynasty. During the Joseon dynasty, all rules, principles, and ideologies were affected by Confucianism. Since this era, typical Korean Jangrae procedure has been established as a burial. Since the 17th century, Catholicism and Christianity has been introduced in Korea and has influenced it. One Korean method for cremation is Jayeonjang (자연장), which is practiced by scattering the bone ashes on a garden, a tree, or the water.

== See also ==
- Veneration of the dead
