= Beijing Shejitan =

Confucian altar in Beijing, China

Coordinates: 39°54′38″N 116°23′19″E

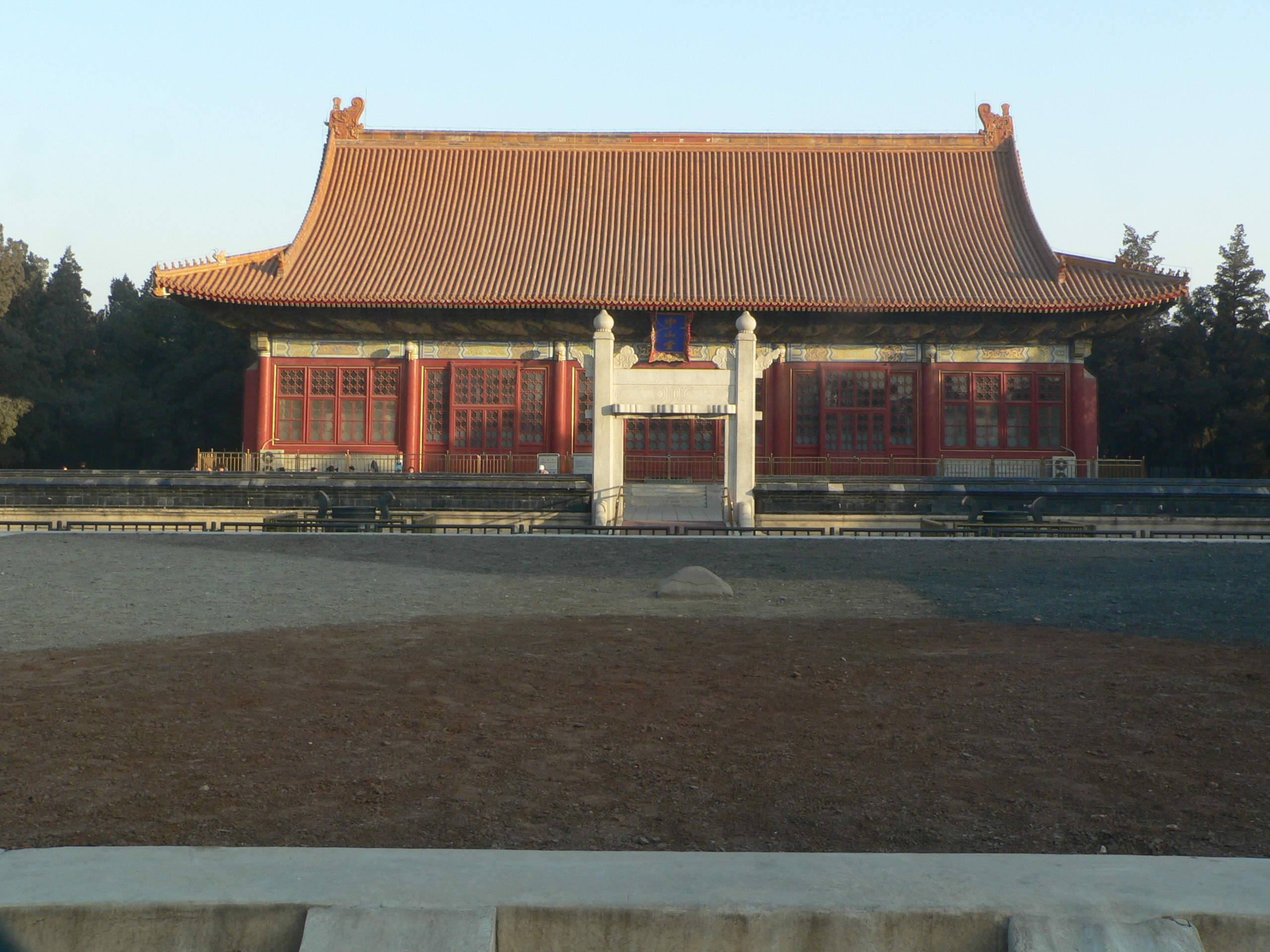
Beijing Shejitan

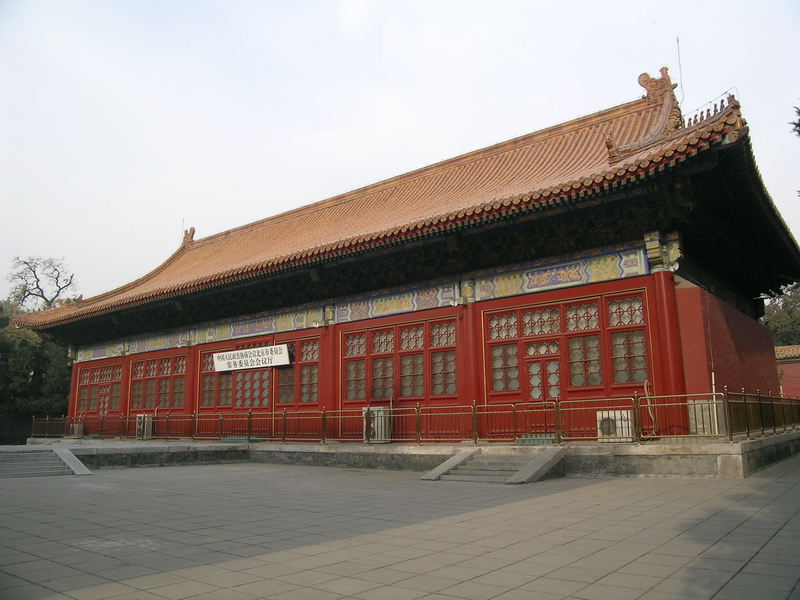

The Beijing Shejitan (simplified Chinese: 北京社稷坛; traditional Chinese: 北京社稷壇), also known as the Altar of Earth and Harvests or the Altar of Land and Grain, is a Confucian altar located in the Zhongshan Park in Beijing, China. Built in 1421 by the Ming dynasty, it was where national soil and grain ceremonies were conducted during the Ming and Qing dynasties. The Shejitan is also located in the opposite geometric location to the Imperial Ancestral Temple. Along with the Imperial Ancestral Temple, the Temple of Agriculture, and the Temple of Heaven, it is one of Beijing's main imperial temples.

== See also ==
- Nine Altars and Eight Temples
- Imperial City, Beijing
- Sajikdan, Seoul
