= Jesa =

Korean traditional ancestral rites

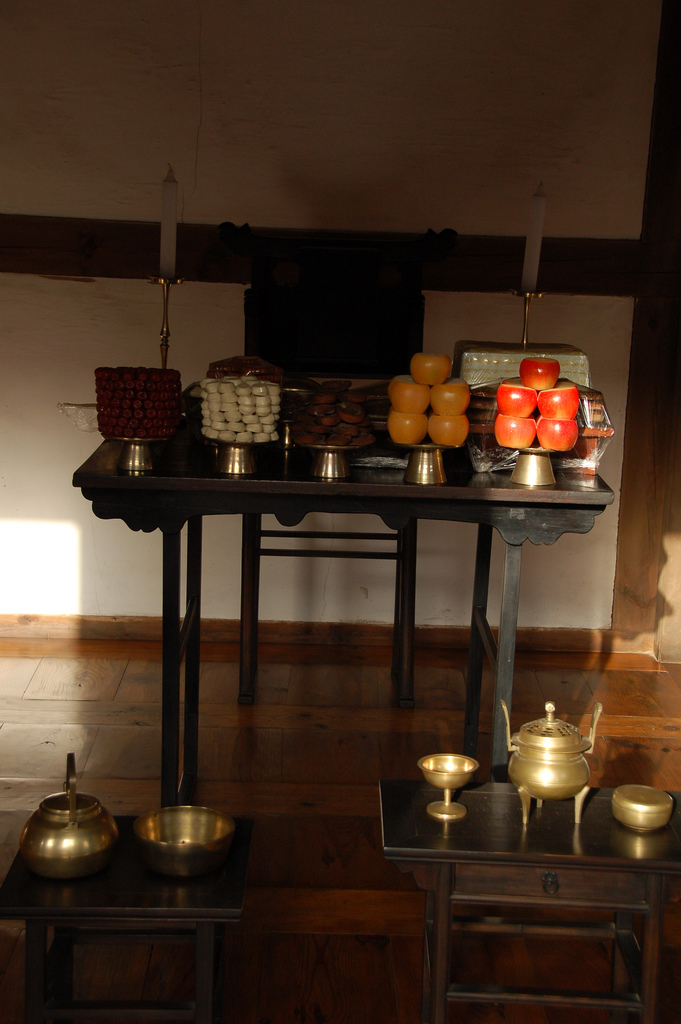

Korean name
- Hangul: 제사
- Hanja: 祭祀
- RR: jesa
- MR: chesa

Jesa (Korean: 제사, Korean pronunciation: [tɕe.sa]) is a ceremony commonly practiced in Korea. Jesa functions as a memorial to the ancestors of the participants. Jesa are usually held on the anniversary of the ancestor's death. The majority of Catholics, Buddhists and nonbelievers practice ancestral rites, although many Protestants do not.

Since their origins, Jesa has taken on a certain formality as human civilization has developed, which is sometimes called rituals in Confucianism.

The Catholic ban on ancestral rituals was lifted in 1939, when Pope Pius XII formally recognized ancestral rites as a civil practice. Many Korean Protestants no longer practice this rite and avoid it both locally and overseas.

== History in Korea ==
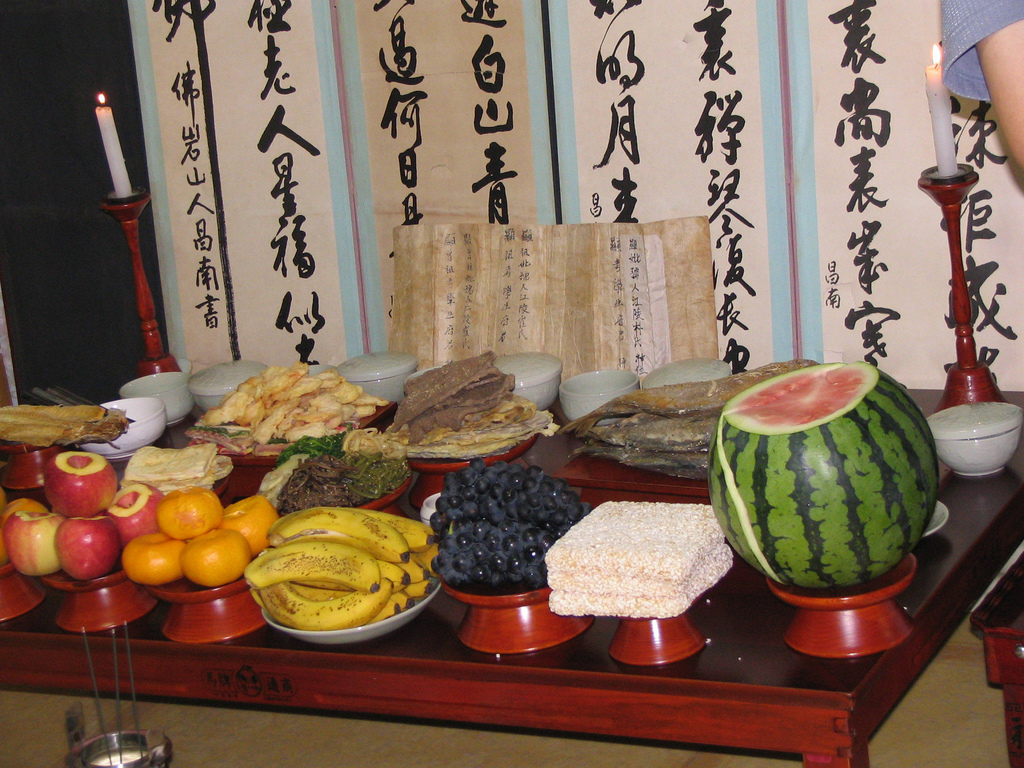
A jesa spread (2005)

=== Prehistoric ===
Korean ancestral worship can be traced back to Korean bronze age, as table-top dolmens found in Korean peninsula, Liaodong, and Manchuria were used for ancestral worship among different social groups.

=== Jecheon event ===
The Jecheon event has been inherited from Dangun Joseon to Yeonggo (迎鼓) in Buyeo, Mucheon (舞天) in Dongye, Alliance of Goguryeo (東盟), Jingungjesa (Silla), and Palgwanhoe (八關會) in Goryeo. Up to this point, it was governed by the state. However, when Joseon started paying tribute to China and adopted Confucianism as its ruling ideology, the heavenly culture ceases to exist. After that, King Gojong established Weongudan (圜丘壇), a celestial altar, and revived the celestial culture. Today's Confucian rituals were introduced from the end of Goryeo. Then, in the early Joseon Dynasty, China 's 'Juju Ga-rye' was accepted and spread gradually, centering on the four majors.

=== Jesa as national ritual ===
In Korea, ancestral rites have been held for the safety and welfare of the country and its people since ancient times. These national ceremonies include ancestral rites and ancestor worship .

The Jecheon event is an event held in heaven, and is held in Yeonggo (迎鼓) in Buyeo, Mucheon (舞天) in Dongye, Alliance of Goguryeo, and in May and October of Samhan . There were ritual ceremonies such as the May Festival and the October Festival. In addition, the Palgwanhoe (八關會) held in Silla and Goryeo and Wonguje (圜丘祭) held in Goryeo and Joseon are also among the festivals of Jecheon.

In addition, ancestor worship continued from ancient times. In Goguryeo, ancestral rites were held to Gojumong and Yuhwa, the founders of the nation, and there was also Dongmyeongmyo in Baekje, which was believed to have diverged from Goguryeo. In Silla, during the reign of King Namhae, Hyukgeosemyo was built. In Goryeo and Joseon, ancestral rites were held to enshrine Dangun, and Jongmyo and Sajik were established respectively to hold ancestral rites for the ancestors of the dynasty. Also, in Joseon, Confucianism was worshiped and a burial site was established, and the rite of munmyo held there was a national rite.

== Kinds of ancestor rituals ==
There are several kinds of ancestor rituals such as gijesa (기제사, 忌祭祀), charye (차례, 茶禮), seongmyo (성묘, 省墓), and myosa (묘사, 墓祀). Gijesa is a memorial service which is held on the day of the ancestor's death every year. Gijesa is performed until upwards of five generations of ancestors in the eldest descendant's house. Memorial services that are performed on Chuseok or New Year's Day are called "charye". On April 5 and before Chuseok, Koreans visit the tombs of their ancestors and trim the grass off the tombs. Then, they offer food, fruits, and wine, and finally make bows in front of the tombs. Memorial services that are performed in front of tombs are called "seongmyo". Finally Myosa are performed at the tomb site in the lunar month of October to conduct in memory of old ancestors (five or more generations).

Ancestral rites are typically divided into 3 categories:

1. Charye (차례, 茶禮) – tea rites held 4 times a year on major holidays (Korean New Year, Chuseok)
2. Gije (기제, 忌祭, also called gijesa) – household rites held the night before or morning of an ancestor's death anniversary (기일, 忌日).
3. Sije (시제, 時祭; also called 사시제 or 四時祭) – seasonal rites held for ancestors who are 5 or more generations removed (typically performed annually on the tenth lunar month)

== Performance ==
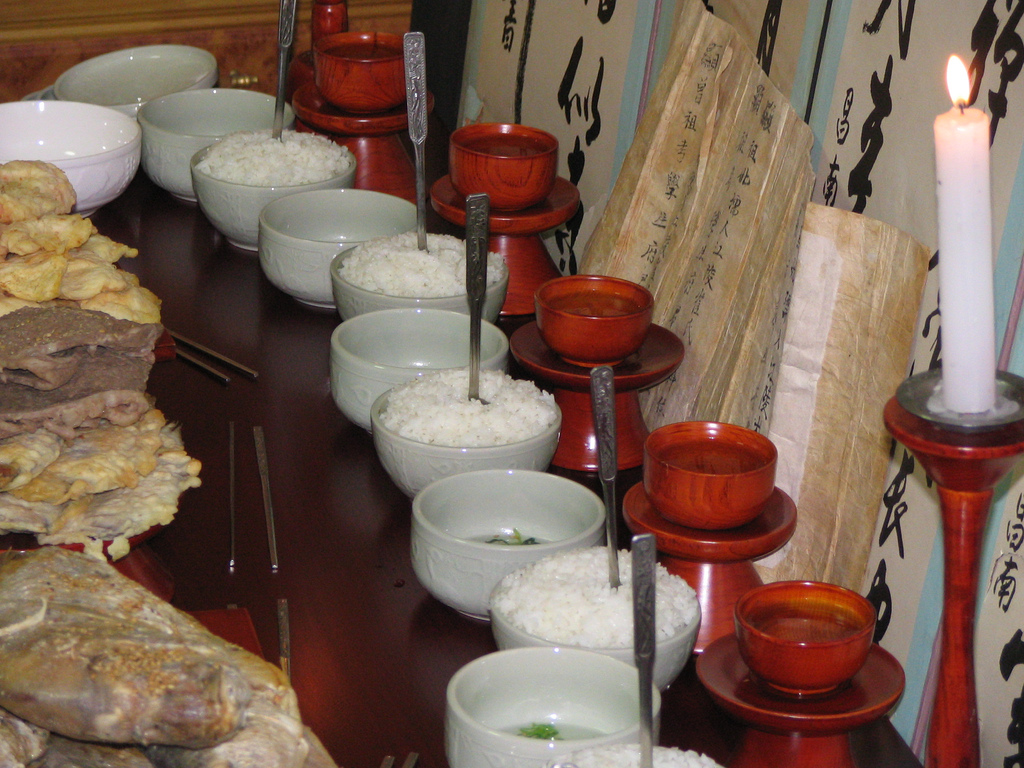
Jesasang (Jesa table)

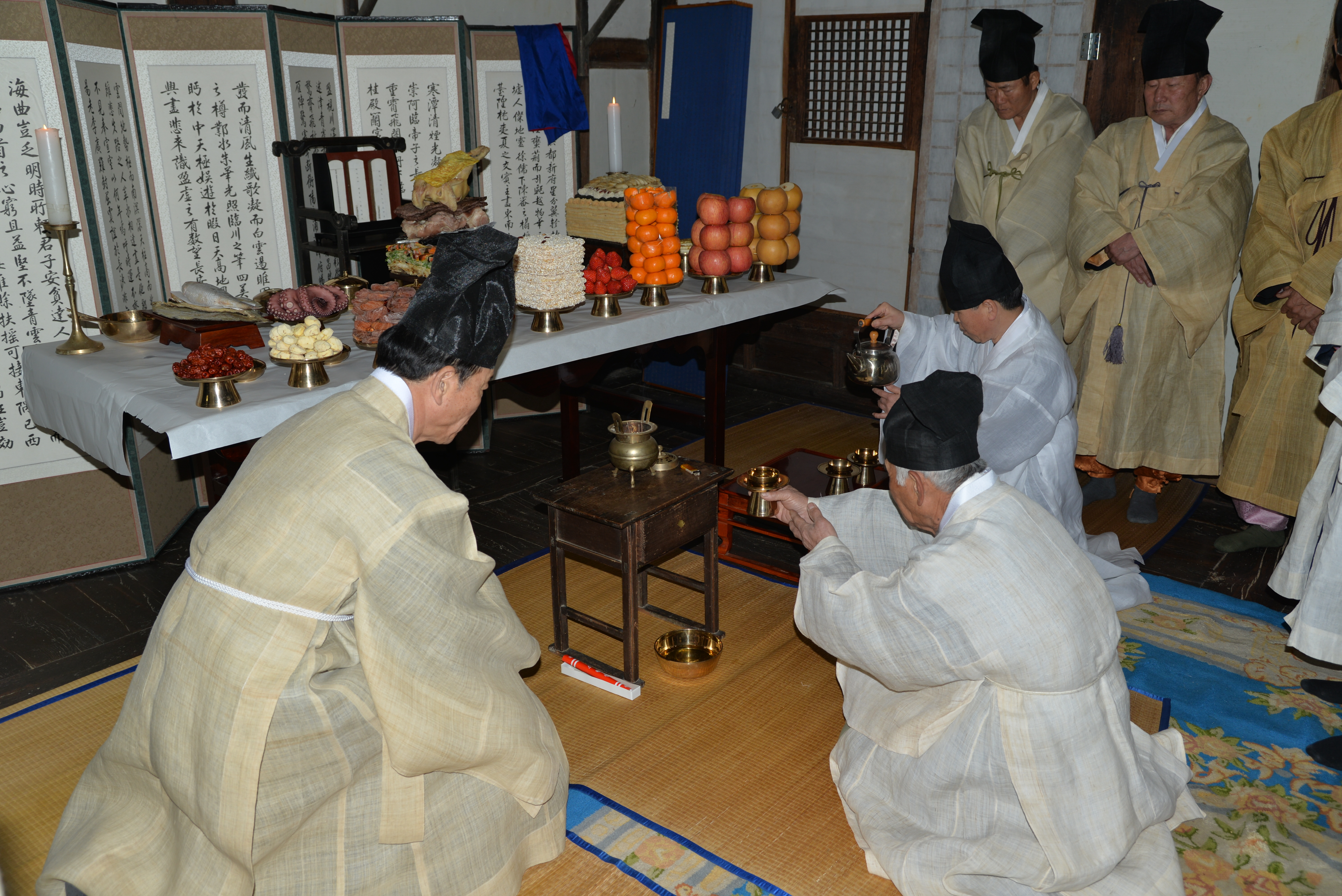
A jesa being performed

To perform ancestor rituals, the family at the eldest son's house prepare many kinds of food such as wine, taro soup, beef, fish, three different colored vegetables, many kinds of fruits, and songpyeon(rice cake), particularly those that were favored by the deceased. The shinwi (신위, 神位) or memorial tablet, which symbolizes the spiritual presence of the ancestor, is placed at the center of the table. In modern days, the daughter or younger son of the family may perform these rites.

After midnight or in the evening before an ancestor's death anniversary, the descendants set the shrine, with a paper screen facing north and food laid out on a lacquer table as follows: rice, meat, and white fruits on the west, soup, fish, and red fruits on the east, with fruits on the first row, meat and fish on the second, vegetables on the third, and cooked rice and soup on the last. The rice bowls and individual offerings to the male ancestors are placed to the west, and those of females to the east (고서비동, 考西妣東). Two candles are also laid on both ends of the table, and an incense holder is placed in the middle. In front of the shrine, they set up written prayer, if the family does not own a memorial tablet (신위).

A typical rite is generally performed following this sequence:

1. Kangshin (강신, 降神) – Several ritual greetings call the spirits down then follow.
2. Choheon (초헌, 初獻, "initial offering") – The eldest male descendant makes the first offering of rice wine, followed by his wife. At the conclusion of the first ritual offering, the eldest son would show his respects by performing a ritual bow twice. The wife bows four times.
3. Aheon (아헌, 亞獻, "secondary offering") – The second eldest male descendant (typically the next eldest sons or sons-in law) makes an offering of liquor as well.
4. Jongheon (종헌, 終獻, "final offering") – The third eldest male descendant (typically the next eldest sons or sons-in law) makes an offering of liquor as well. Offerings are continued to be made until no high-ranking male descendants are left.
5. Sapsi (삽시, 揷匙, "spoon insertion") – The main course is served by the eldest male descendant, to the memorial tablet, by sticking a spoon into the middle of the rice bowl.
6. Yushik (유식, 侑食, "urged meal") – The ancestors receive the offerings and partake in the meal. To do so, participants leave the room, called hapmun (합문, 闔門). Afterward, in gyemun (계문, 啓門) – participants return to the room, after a few minutes. This is signaled by the eldest male descendant clearing his throat twice.
7. Heonda (헌다, 獻茶, "tea offering") – Tea, brewed from roasted rice is offered to the ancestors.
8. Cheolsang (철상, 撤床, "removal of table") – All the attendants at the ceremony bow twice and the spirits are sent off until the next year. The table with the food and wine offerings is then cleared and the written prayer recited earlier on during the ceremony is set a fire.
9. Eumbok (음복, 飮福, "drink blessings") – Participants divide the sacrificial offerings and partake in the feast. Consuming the ritual food and wine is considered to be an integral part of the ceremony, as it symbolizes the receiving of the blessings bestowed upon the family.

The altar food may be distributed to neighbors and friends in a Buddhist rite called shishik, which is a form of merit-making that, along with sutra reading and intoning of Buddha's teachings, expedities the deceased spirit's entry into Sukhavati.

== Modern ancestor rituals ==
Ancestor worship has significantly changed in recent years. These days it is common to hold ancestor rituals up to only two generations of ancestors, and in some cases, people only hold rituals for their dead parents. In addition, more people are holding rituals in the evening, not after midnight. People can also perform ancestor rituals in a younger son's house.

Today, in most Korean families, ancestor rituals still remain an important part of their culture and they are faithfully observed. These ancestor rituals, in spite of revised form, continue to play an important part in modern Korean society, which testifies to their inherent importance in the lives of Koreans.

== Heotjesatbap ==
In Andong during the Joseon period, it was common for jesa foods to be eaten rather than used in the ceremony. Such meals were called heotjesatbap (lit. "fake jesa food"). The most common dish was a special type of bibimbap mixed with soy sauce instead of the more commonly used hot pepper paste gochujang. They were a common late-night snack for yangban scholars known as seonbi, and many restaurants in Andong still serve heotjesatbap today.

== See also ==
- Ancestral tablet
- Chinese ancestral worship
- Chinese Rites controversy
- Death anniversary
- Folk religion
  - Festival
  - Matsuri
  - Sacrifice to Heaven
  - Filial mourning
  - Śrāddha
  - Jecheon event
  - Omiki
- Jangnye
- Merit-making
- Parentalia, similar rites in ancient Rome
- Veneration of the dead
