= Sacrifice to Heaven =

East Asian noble religious ritual

Chinese name
- Chinese: 祭天
- Traditional Chinese: 祭天
Transcriptions
Standard Mandarin
- Hanyu Pinyin: Jitian

Vietnamese name
- Vietnamese alphabet: Tế Thiên; Lễ tế Nam Giao
- Chữ Hán: 祭天 禮祭南郊

Korean name
- Hangul: 제천
- Hanja: 祭天
Transcriptions
- Revised Romanization: Jecheon

Japanese name
- Kanji: 祭天
- Hiragana: さいてん
Transcriptions
- Romanization: Saiten

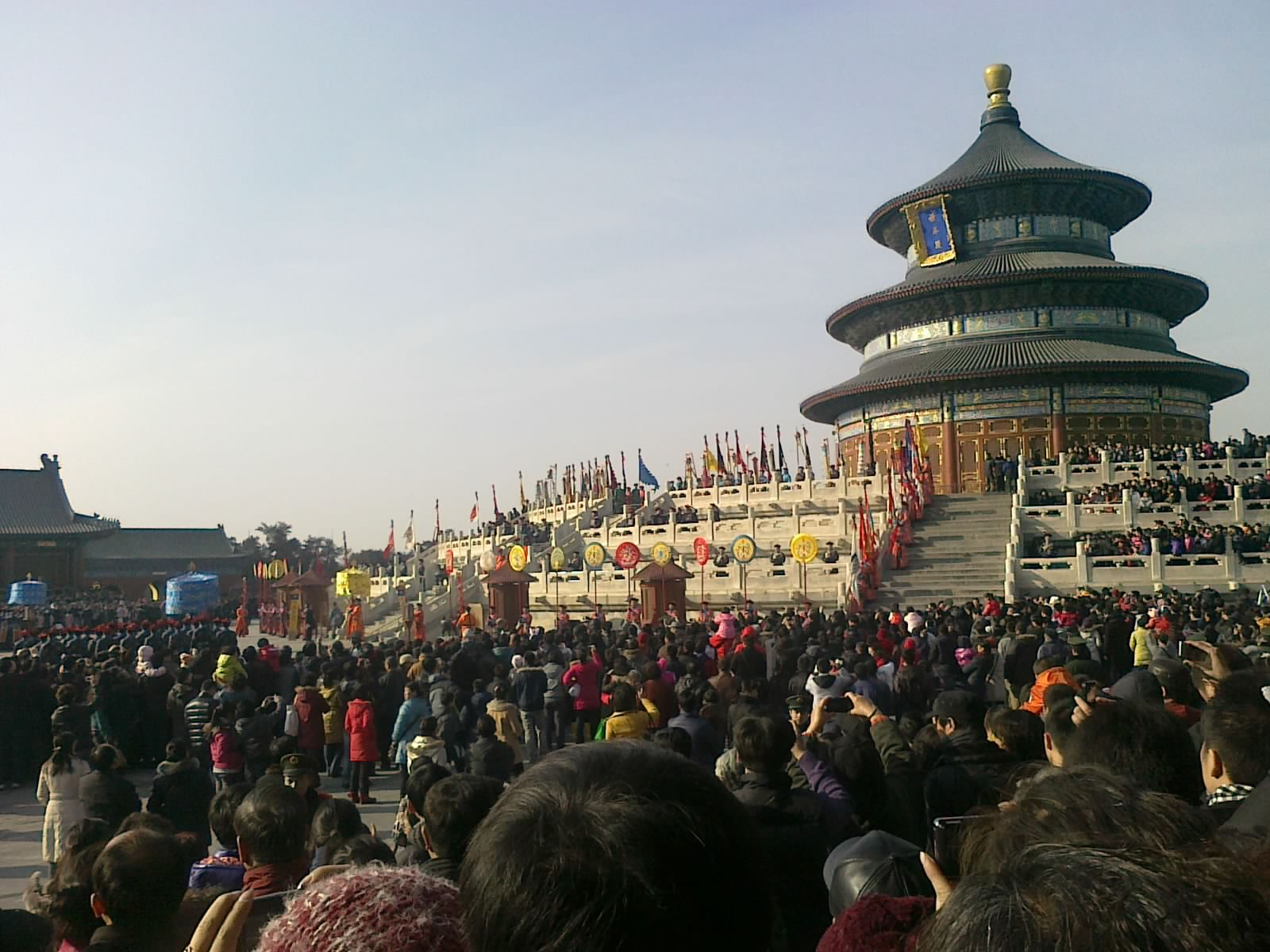
A festival performed at the Temple of Heaven

Sacrifice to Heaven (Chinese: 祭天; pinyin: Jìtiān) is an Asian religious practice originating in the worship of Shangdi in China. In Ancient Chinese society, nobles of all levels constructed altars for Heaven. At first, only nobles could worship Shangdi but later beliefs changed and everyone could worship Shangdi.

Modern Confucian churches make this practice available to all believers and it continues in China without a monarch.

It has been influential on areas outside of China including Japan, Vietnam, and Korea.

The Jì (祭) in the Chinese name is the same Je as in Jesa.

== History ==
It first originated in the Shang dynasty. During the Zhou dynasty, Sacrifice to Heaven and Fen Shan, were privileges enjoyed exclusively by the Son of Heaven due to Shendao teachings.

The rites have been performed at the Temple of Heaven since the Ming dynasty and are still performed today.

Some scholars believe that Qing involvement with the ritual standardized Manchu rituals with the book of Manchu rites, but this is unsupported.

Since the early years of the Republic of China, Kang Youwei's Confucian movement advocated the separation of Religious Confucianism from the state bureaucracy, allowing everyone to Sacrifice to Heaven according to the Christian model.

In the 21st century, it is done without a monarch. It is sometimes done in other locations aside from the Temple of Heaven, such as in Fujian in 2015

== In Korea ==
In Korea, Sacrifice to Heaven is read as Jecheon (Hanja: 祭天). It is also identified with the word yeonggo 영고 (迎鼓) and has a history linked to Korean shamanism, in addition to Chinese influence.

In Buyeo, during the yeonggo festival which was held in December, prisoners would be released and judgments given. It was used as a political tool in a manner similar to a jubilee.

These ceremonies were typically characterized by communal and thanksgiving aspects and in Buyeo, it was done after the harvest.

=== Dongye ===
Mucheon (舞天), a religious ritual and a comprehensive art form of the Dongye, was an event held during the first month of the lunar calendar (October) in which offerings were made to the heavens and people climbed high mountains to have fun. According to a commentary called the Touyuan Booklet (兎園策府), included in the Dunhuang manuscripts during the Tang Dynasty in China, Mucheon was a custom in Gojoseon that was held in October.

=== Goryeo ===
During the Goryeo Dynasty, there was a Jecheon event called Eight Gwanhoe (팔관회 / 八關會). It was a successor to Silla's Eight Gwanhoe, an event where sacrifices were made to the spirits of all things and the heavens.

There was also an event called Weonguje (圜丘祭), which came from China. According to the Goryeo History, it was practiced from the time of Goryeo Seongjong, and it is said that the Weongudan (圜丘壇) was built to offer sacrifices to the sky. As a place to offer sacrifices to the heavens, Weongudan was repeatedly installed and abolished from the Goryeo Dynasty.

=== Joseon ===
During the early Joseon Dynasty, Sejo (世祖), a temple was built and the Sacrifices to Heaven were held, but it was discontinued after seven years. The reasoning was that only the emperor could offer sacrifices to the heavens, and Joseon, as an imperial state, had no such authority as per little China ideology. Later, after the country was renamed the Korean Empire, the practice was restored and a Hwangudan was built for the purpose.

== Japan ==
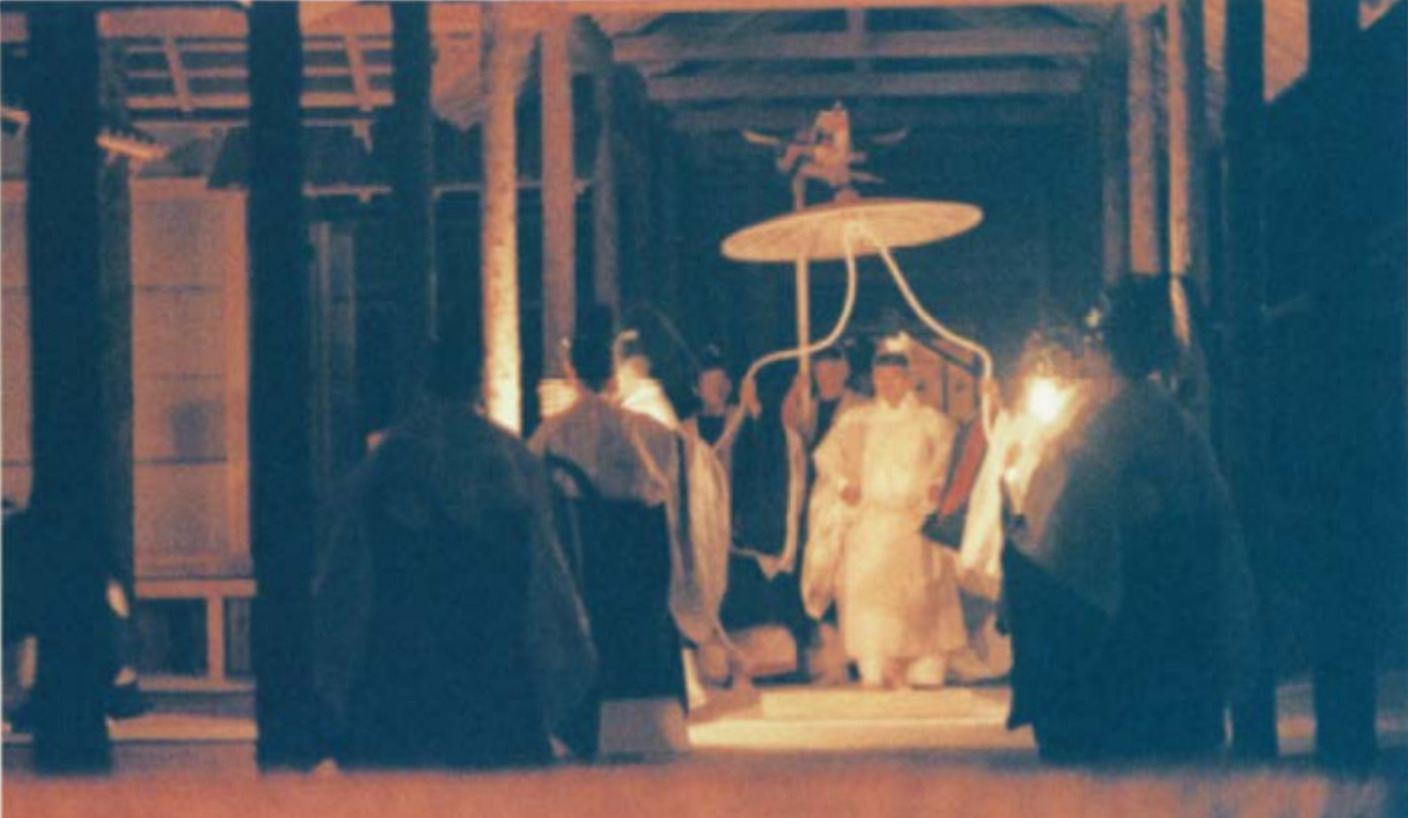
Emperor Akihito performed the Daijosai when he ascended the throne in 1990. A variation of the Niiname-no-Matsuri.

The ritual of Sacrifice to Heaven (祭天, Saiten) was imported from China to Japan during the Tang Dynasty. The emperor would perform the sacrifice on the winter solstice. According to the book Shoku Nihongi (Japanese: 続日本紀), Emperor Shōmu performed a ritual sacrifice to the heavens during the summer court ceremony (the first day of the New Year, year 725).

The religions of Japan have been heavily influenced by imported beliefs such as Confucianism and Buddhism, which were merged with the country's indigenous religion of Shinto. The Sun Goddess Amaterasu is considered the supreme deity in Japan and is considered the ancestor of both the Emperor and the country. The Emperors were known to build temples and perform sacrifices, leading to the localization of these rituals into the worship of the Sun Goddess at the Ise Shrine.

During the Heian period, Buddhism became deeply ingrained in Japanese society, with the theory of "Honji suijaku" being propagated by the Japanese Royal Family. This theory posited that Buddha was the original deity and that the gods were simply temporary manifestations of the Buddha. According to this theory, the Sun Goddess was seen as an incarnation of Vairocana.

The Shoku Nihongi records that in 698, Emperor Monmu ordered the construction of a temple in the Watarai district of Ise, to worship both gods and Buddha. Over time, the rituals of worshiping the gods took on the characteristics of worshiping the Buddha.

Emperor Kanmu played a pivotal role in centralizing power and establishing the supremacy of the emperor in Japan. In 784, he relocated the capital to Nagaoka-kyō in order to counteract the growing influence of Buddhism in the Nara region and to promote the study of Chinese Confucian texts, such as the Spring and Autumn Annals, among the population. Therefore, he performed a sacrifice to heaven in 785 on the Winter Solstice to assert his authority

The modern concept emerged in Japan in the Meiji period with the rise of western style Japanese nationalism and its promotion by the Imperial House of Japan. Sacrifice to Heaven is still performed but it is considered a form of Shinto. Every year, the festival of Niiname-no-Matsuri (新嘗祭) is performed. Most Japanese citizens are unaware of the connection to China. The first such festival of the reign of an Emperor is called the Daijosai.

== Vietnam ==
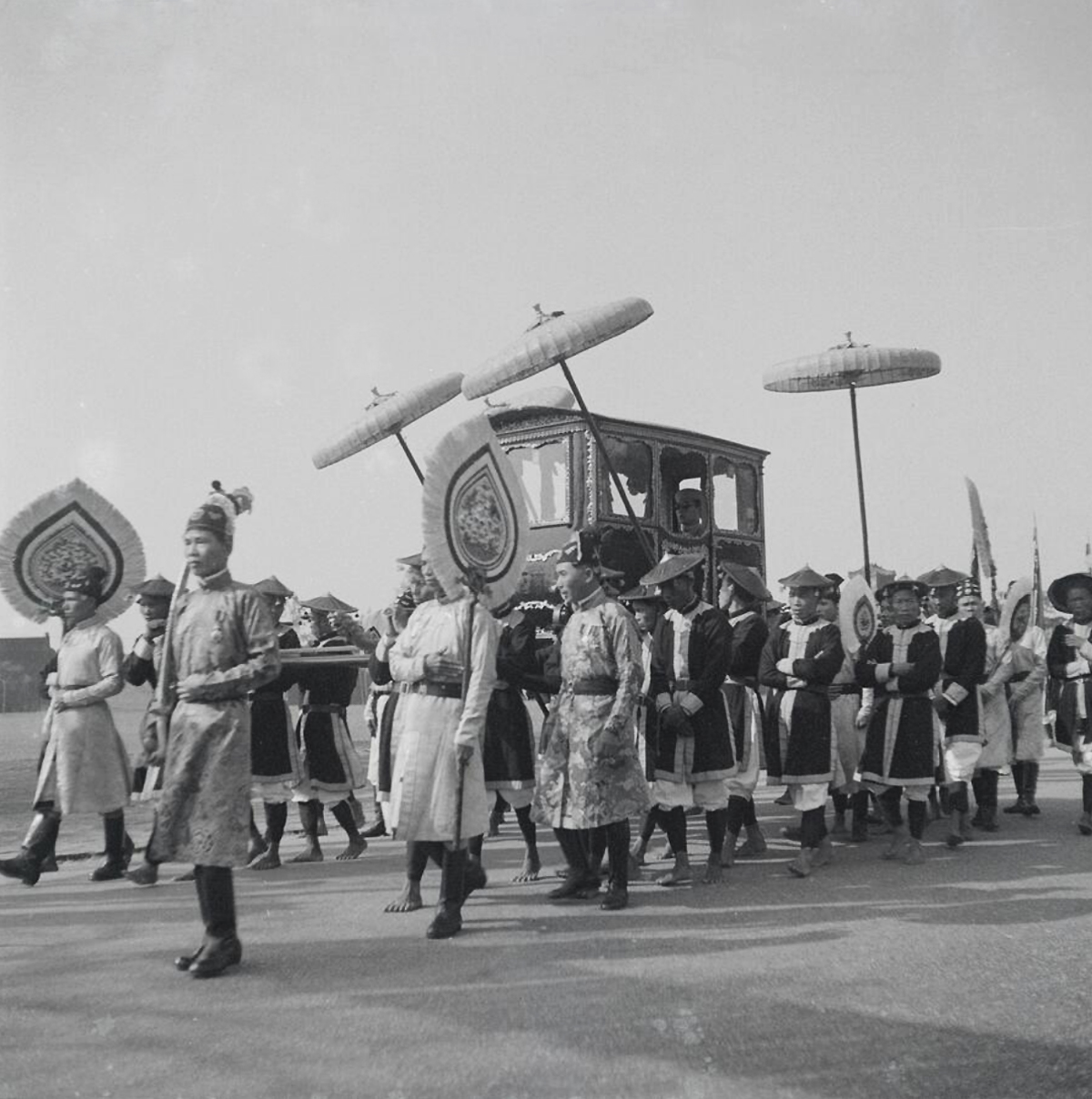
Emperor Bảo Đại's carriage and his envoy during the Lễ Tế Giao ceremony of 1942.

In Vietnam, tế thiên or Sacrifice to Heaven was first established with the Đinh dynasty when Đinh Bộ Lĩnh declared himself Emperor. The Đại Việt sử ký toàn thư records an early sacrifice by Lý Anh Tông in 1154.

It is better known in Vietnam by the name Nam Giao.

From the Lý dynasty onwards, the ritual was seen as highly important.

Nam Giao is considered the most important sacrificial ritual of the Nguyễn dynasty and is the only well-documented one.

In the Nguyễn dynasty, the Esplanade of Sacrifice to the Heaven and Earth was made to sacrifice to heaven. It was made in 1807 and continuous sacrifices were made at it until 1945. The Nam Giao sacrifice ceremony was gradually restored to be included in Festival Huế every two years from 2002 and continues to this day.

== See also ==
- Temple of Heaven
- Wufang Shangdi
- Ancestor veneration in China
- Tian
- Son of Heaven
- Jesa
- Feng Shan
- Interactions Between Heaven and Mankind
- Unity of Heaven and humanity
- Tenno taitei
- Shangdi
