= Esplanade of Sacrifice to the Heaven and Earth =

Imperial altar in Huế, Vietnam

- Đàn Nam Giao
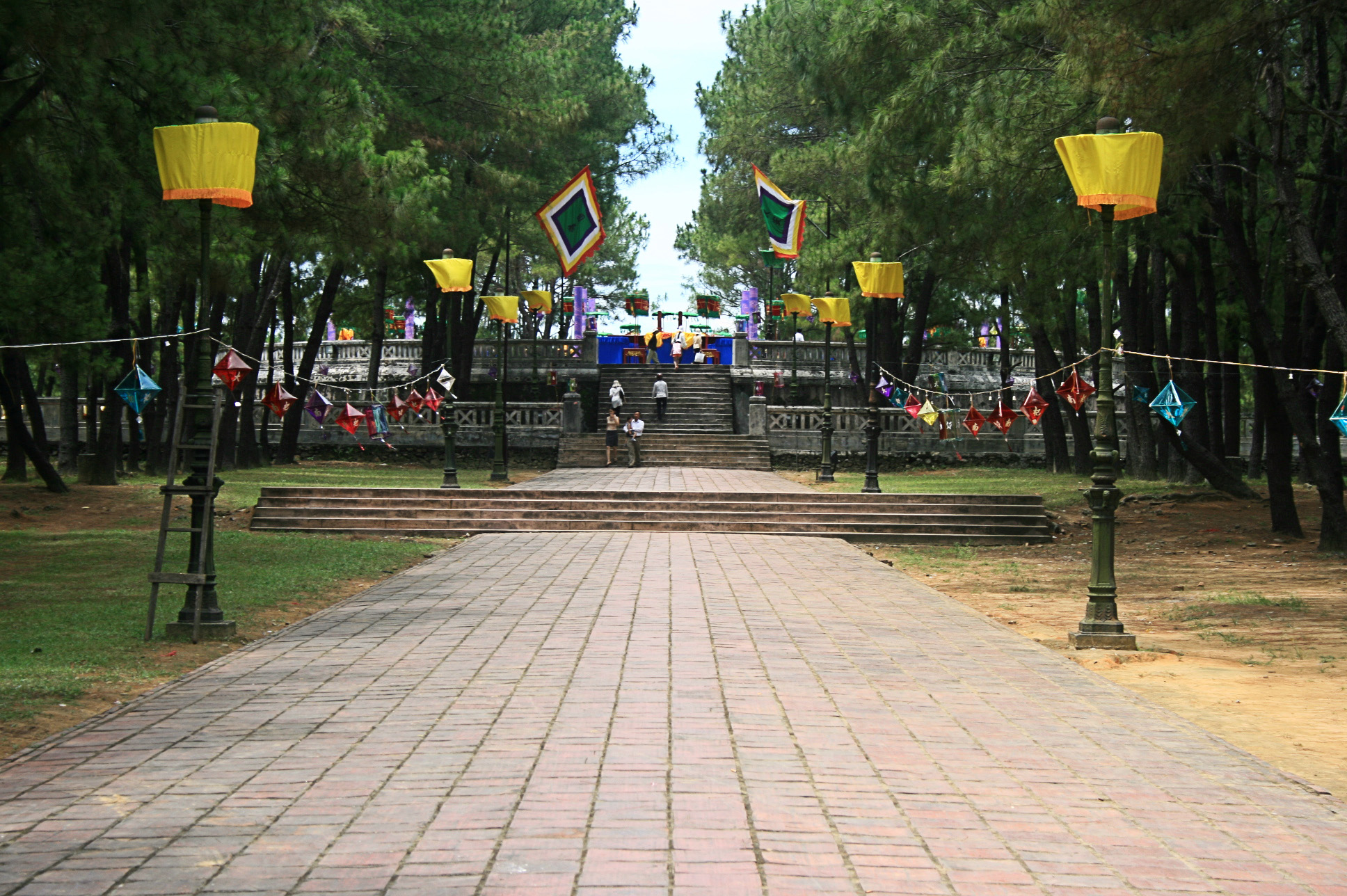

Religion
- Affiliation: Vietnamese folk religion
- Province: Huế
- Region: Central Vietnam

Location
- Location: Complex of Huế ancient capital relics
- Country: Vietnam
- Interactive map of Esplanade of Sacrifice to the Heaven and Earth

Architecture
- Architect: Altar
- Creator: Gia Long
- Established: 1803

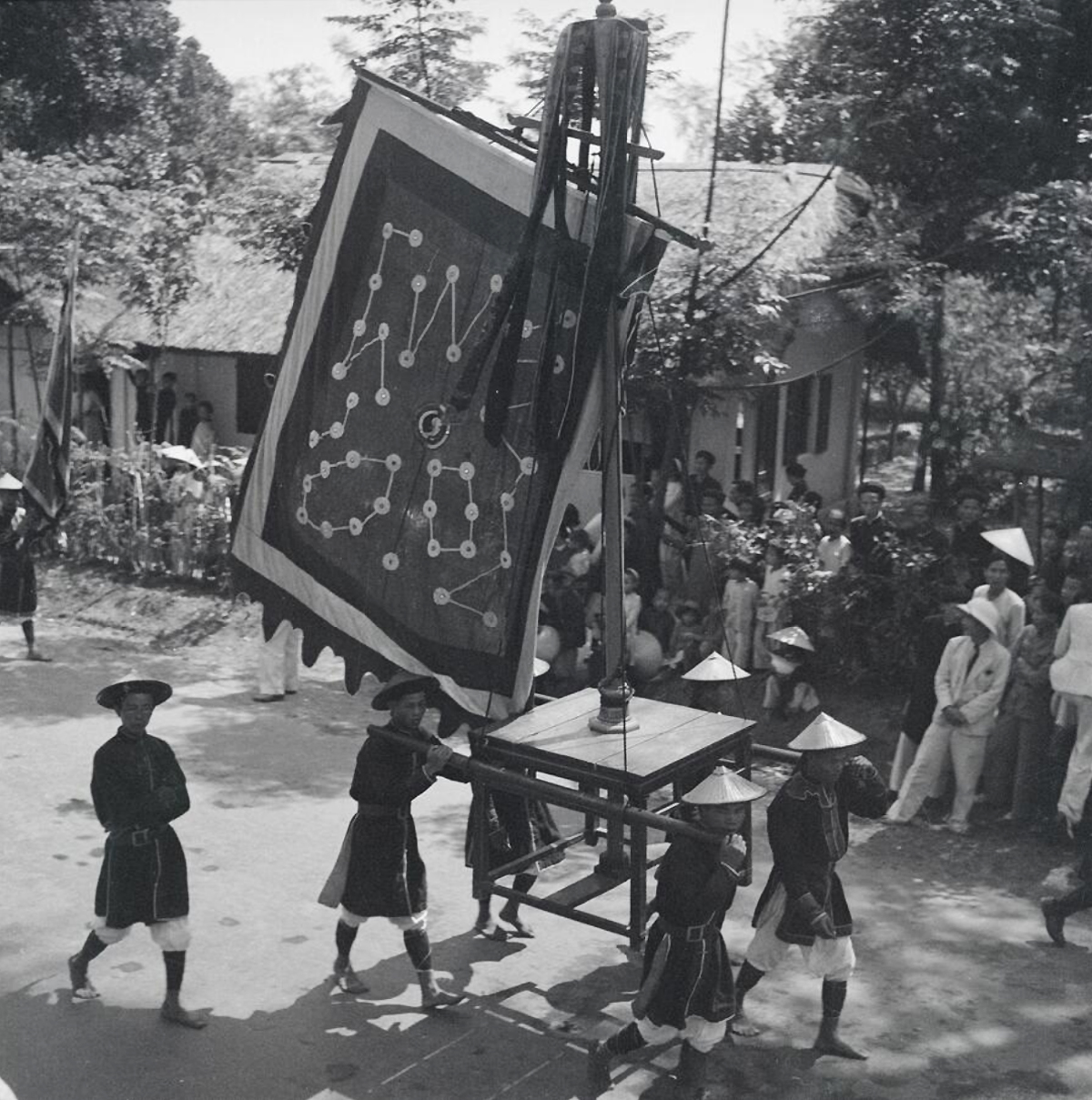
Imperial procession of the prayer to heaven at the Esplanade of Sacrifice to the Heaven and Earth (1942)

The Esplanade of Sacrifice to the Heaven and Earth (Vietnamese: Đàn Nam Giao; chữ Hán: 南郊壇) is an imperial altar situated south of the city of Huế, central Vietnam. It also known as the Nam Giao altar. It is dedicated to the heaven and earth. The complex was visited by the monarchs of the Nguyễn dynasty for annual ceremonies of prayer to Heaven.

== History ==
The ritual offerings to the Earth and Heaven predates the Nguyen dynasty. The earlier Hồ dynasty in the early 15th century CE also offered prayers. The emperor would proceed once a year in the grandest procession on elephants from the Imperial City to the temple. The procession would be accompanied by the playing of the Đăng đàn cung (chữ Hán: 登壇宮, lit. Melody on the Ascent to the Esplanade) anthem.

After the end of the monarchy in 1945, the altar fell into disuse and its state deteriorated. In recent decades steps have been taken to preserve and restore it. The altar was inscribed as part of the UNESCO World Heritage Site of "Complex of Hué Monuments" by the government in 1993 and is thus under special protection.

The ritual worship of offering was revived in 2016, with local officials in attendance.

== The rite of Nam Giao ==
The late night ceremonies of Nam Giao held in the Esplanade in the modern era were first held after many years as part of the Huế Festival in 2004, and are today held biennially with the officials of the Communist Party of Vietnam City Committee and the City People's Government of Huế, as well as the People's Committee and CPV Committee of the Thừa Thiên-Huế Province, in the name of the Central Committee of the CPV and the national government, presiding over the rites with village and neighborhood leaders in attendance together with business leaders and representatives of people's organizations. The ceremony, which is of Chinese origin and is similar to the Korean ceremony of Jongmyo jerye, was performed formerly by the Emperors of Vietnam for many years until 1945 after a three-day fast at the Trai Cung Palace, and today is a one-day event held as part of the Hue Festival, which by itself is a series of events celebrating the Imperial heritage of the city as the old residence of the Imperial Family of Vietnam. Unlike past ceremonies which were limited to the Imperial Family, government and military leaders and civil servants, the current ceremony is open to the public and is well covered by local and foreign media, as well as streamed online for the Vietnamese living abroad. In the past, the date of the ceremony, which was held triennially during the days of the Nguyen Dynasty, was chosen by royal astronomers in accordance with the country's then Confucian, Buddhist and Taoist faiths with the time announced to the nation via messengers and the goods offered to the gods of Heaven in the ceremony were obtained from provinces all over the Empire. While being a modern reenactment of the rites formerly staged during the days wherein Huế was the spiritual and cultural center of all Vietnamese, it is an opportunity also for the people of the city to remember its glory days and pray for the continued prosperity of the city and country, as well as for the continued preservation of the important sites in the history of the Vietnamese nation and people.

The current presiding officer is either the mayor or vice mayor of Hue, formerly either the governor and/or vice governor of Thừa Thiên-Huế, who serves as chairman or vice chairman of the province's People's Committee, the provincial government, in the name of the government and people of said province and of all Vietnam as a whole. The Hue Imperial City People's Council together with provincial authorities and national government representatives form the official party of the ceremony.

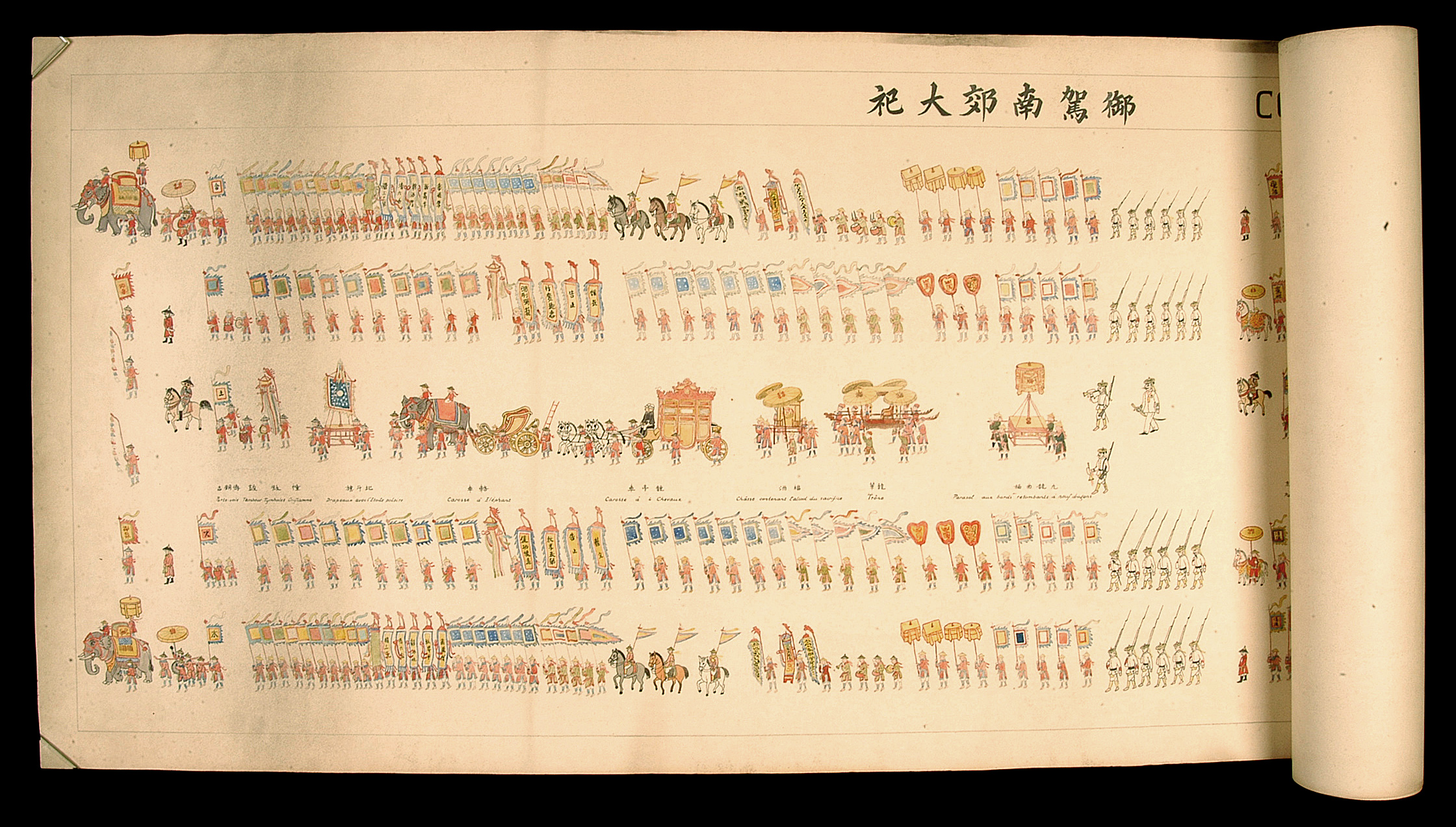
The panorama of Nam Giao procession

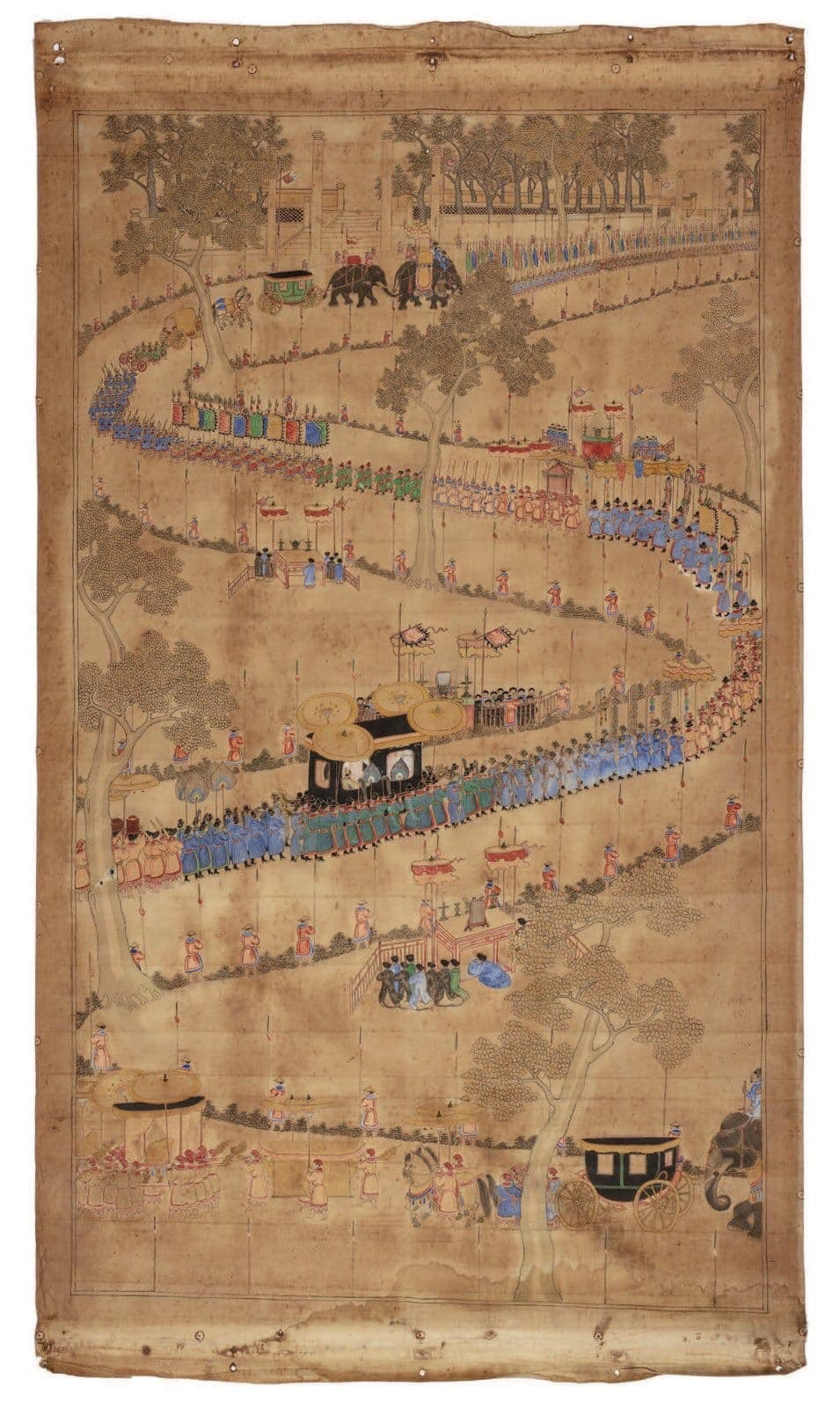
Ceremony of Nam Giao parade.

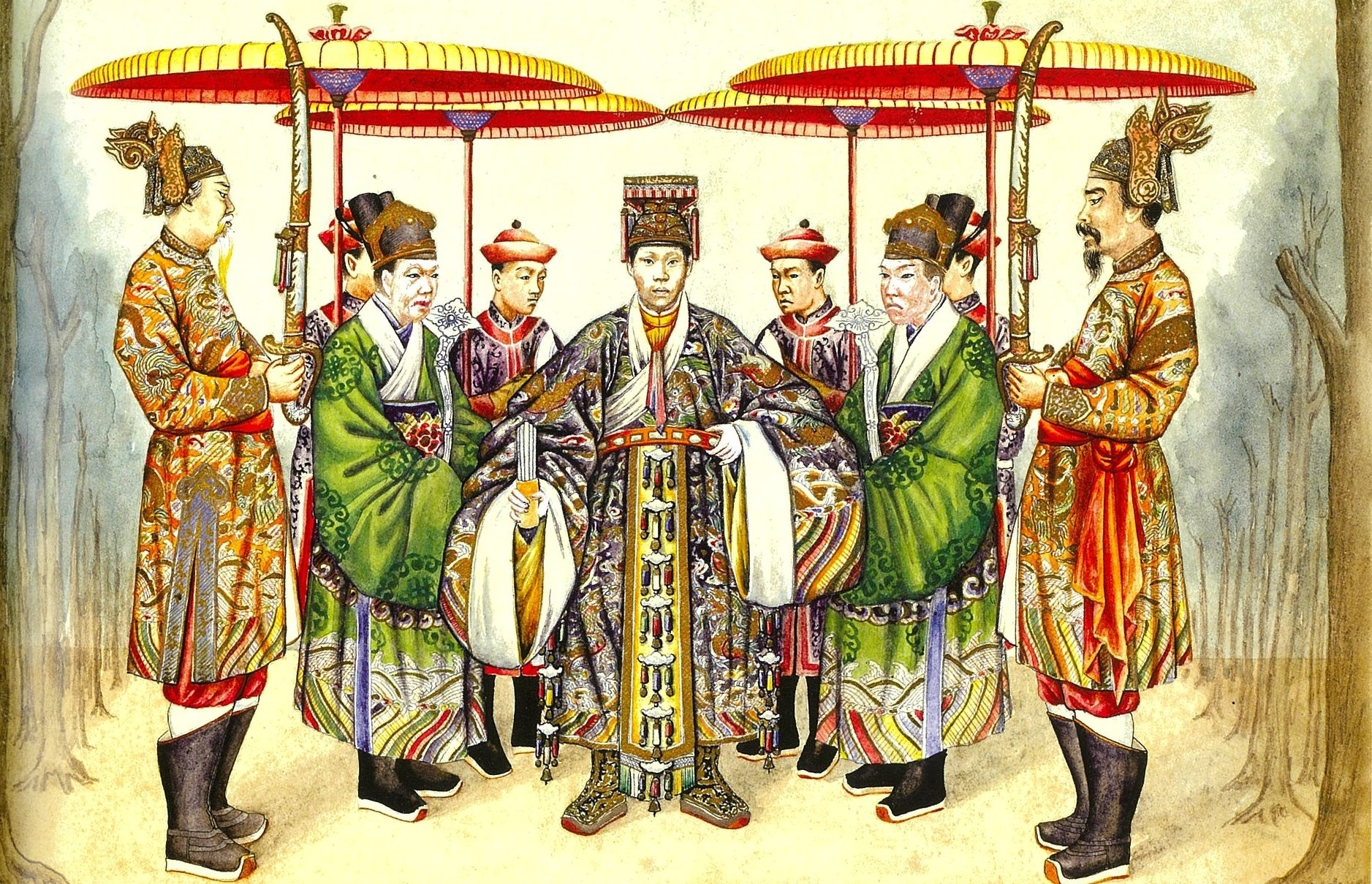
Nam Giao ceremonial dress Cổn miện (袞冕) of emperor during ceremony.

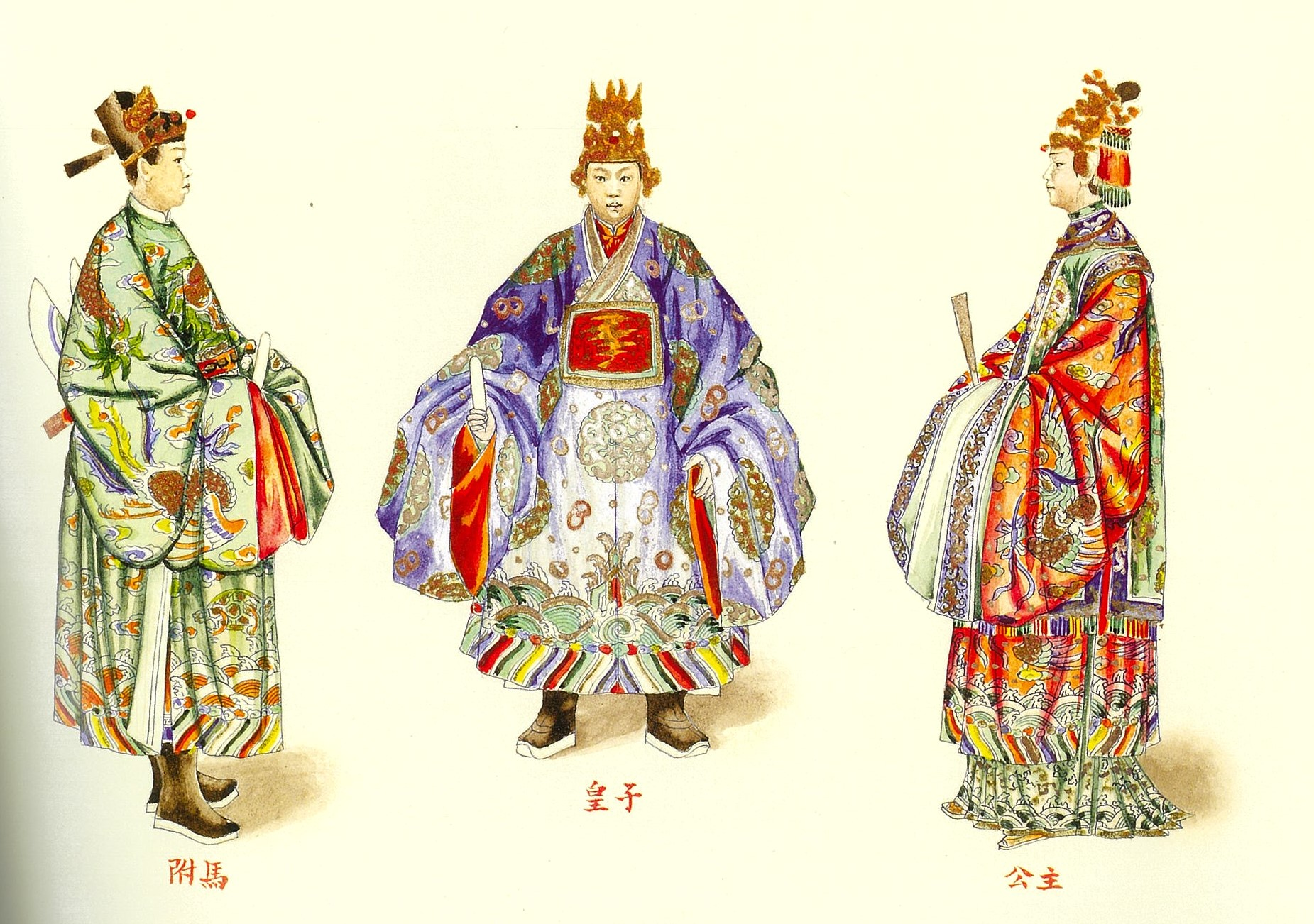
From left to right, court dress of emperor's son-in law (Phò Mã, 駙馬), Nam Giao ceremonial dress of prince (Hoàng Tử, 皇子) and Princess (Công chúa, 公主).

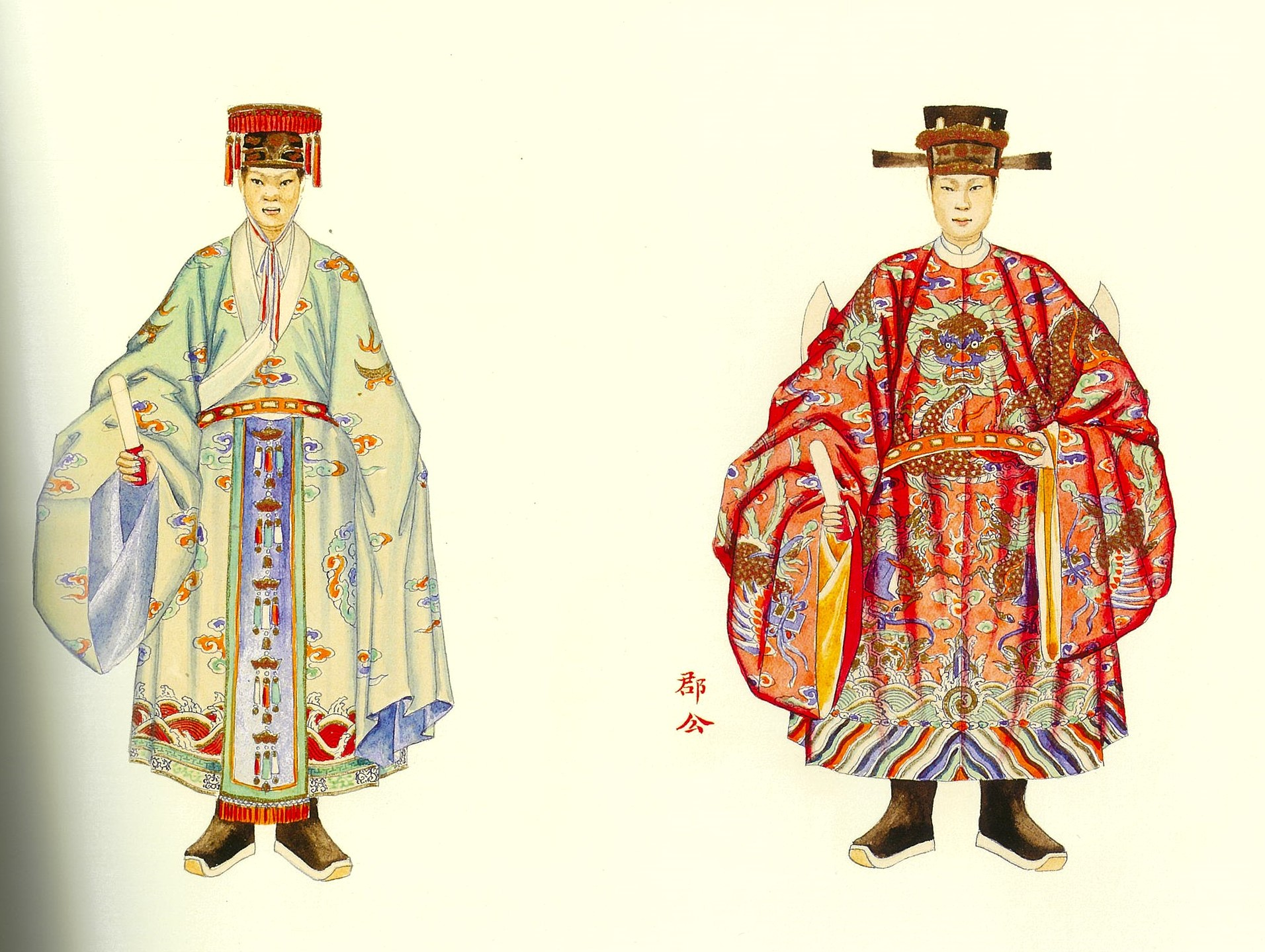
Dress code of Duke (Quận Công, 郡公), ceremonial dress of Nam Giao (left) and court dress (right).

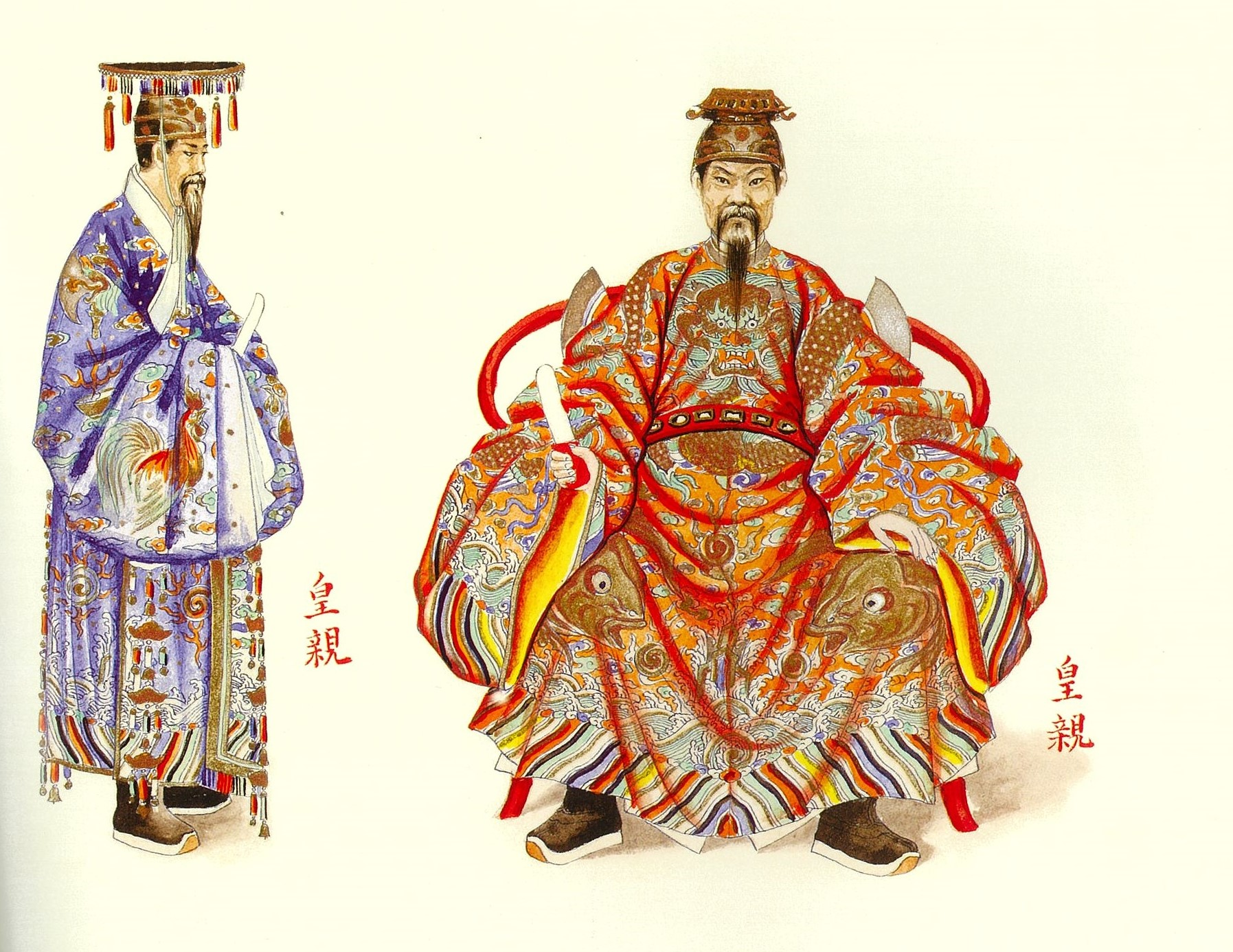
Dress code of imperial members (Hoàng Thân, 皇親), Nam Giao ceremonial dress (left) and court dress (right).

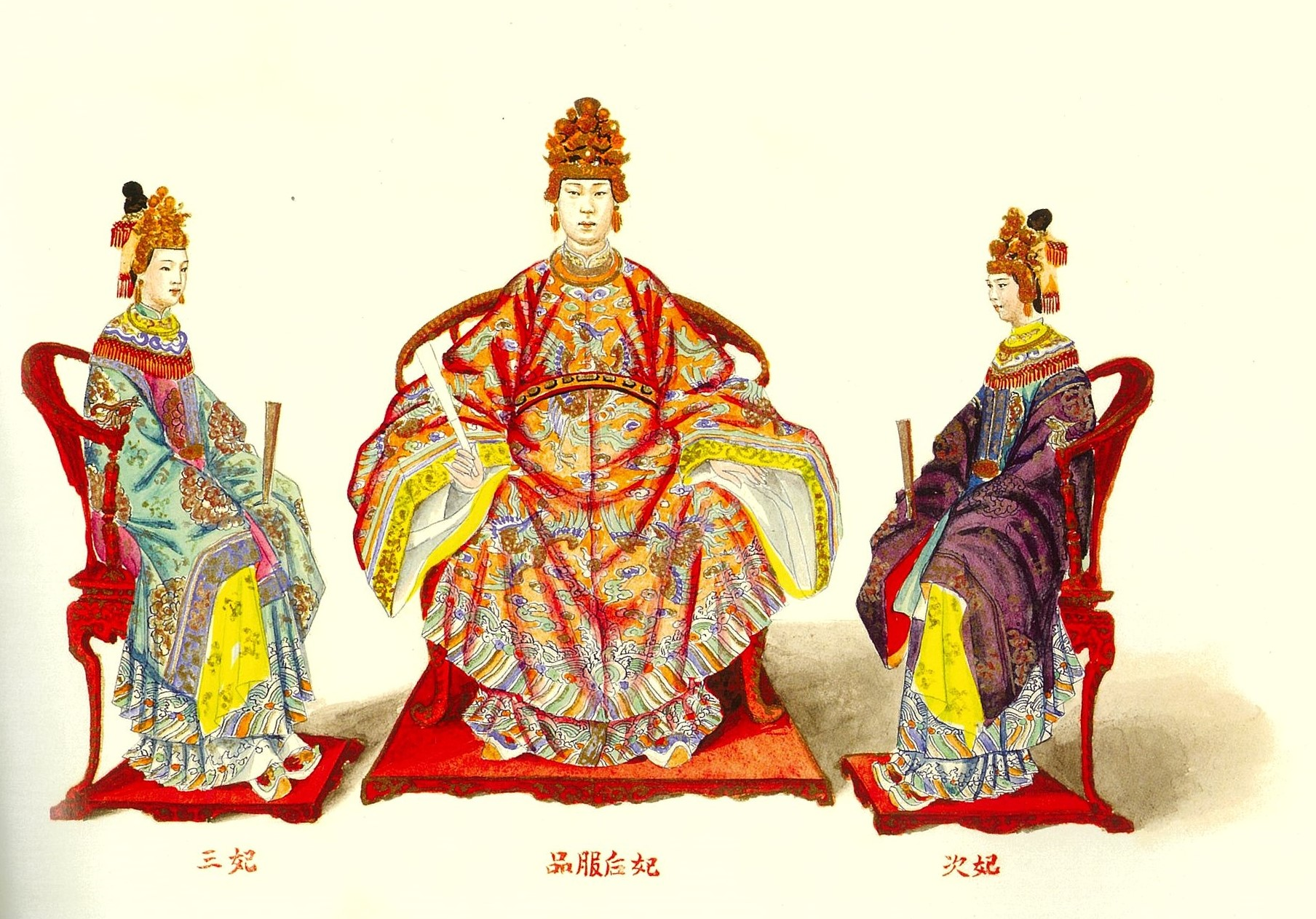
Court dress of third rank concubine (left), Empress consort (middle) and second rank concubine(right).

.

In the current ceremony, the governor or vice governor, wearing the silk robes similar to those worn by the Emperors of old, departs Thái Hòa Imperial Palace in the late morning carrying the ancestral tablet which is to be used in the rites and is soon mounted on the government palanquin, which leaves the Meridian Gate of the Purple Forbidden City complex. On the road outside, a large procession awaits the palanquin section, which is composed of employees of the city government and private citizens wearing costumes worn by servants of the Imperial government and imperial dancers and musicians of the court, which proceeds to Chương Đức gate and out towards the city proper and later on to Nghing Luong Dinh Imperial Port, formerly used by the Imperial household, wherein the presider, after departing the palanquin, then rides a dragon boat on the Perfume River, which then, after travelling to the An Cuu Canal, lands at the Ben Ngu Port at Da Vien Island, wherein the entourage disembarks en route to the Trai Cung Palace to rest before the presider departs to rejoin the procession in the late afternoon to the Esplanade for the ceremony proper as drums and gongs sound the departure. At the late evening, after a long procession in the downtown area and through the Truong An borough, the presider then leaves the palanquin as it arrives at the grounds and after climbing the stairs leading up to the first level, he washes his hands in purification before the ceremony begins in the second level with the presentations of the pre-sacrificed animals (a pig, goat and water buffalo, respectively), which were sacrificed the day before in a prior ceremony, together with the wine, golden silk and gem offerings contributed by citizens of the province, which are then carried by attendants to the main altars at the third level to be offered to the gods of the heavens. At that point the presider prays to the gods of Heaven and Earth in the name of the people of the nation, welcoming them to the ceremony and asking them to bless the conduct of the sacred rites.

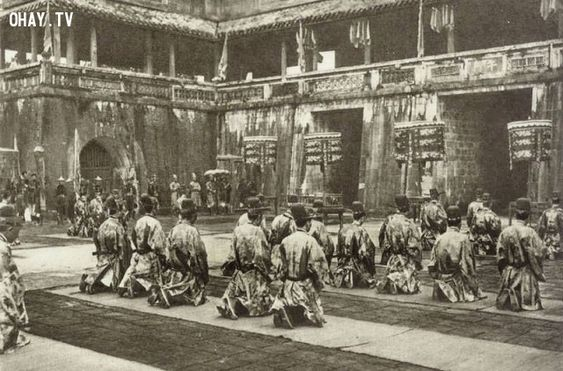
Mandarins kowtow in front of the Imperial palace in 1939

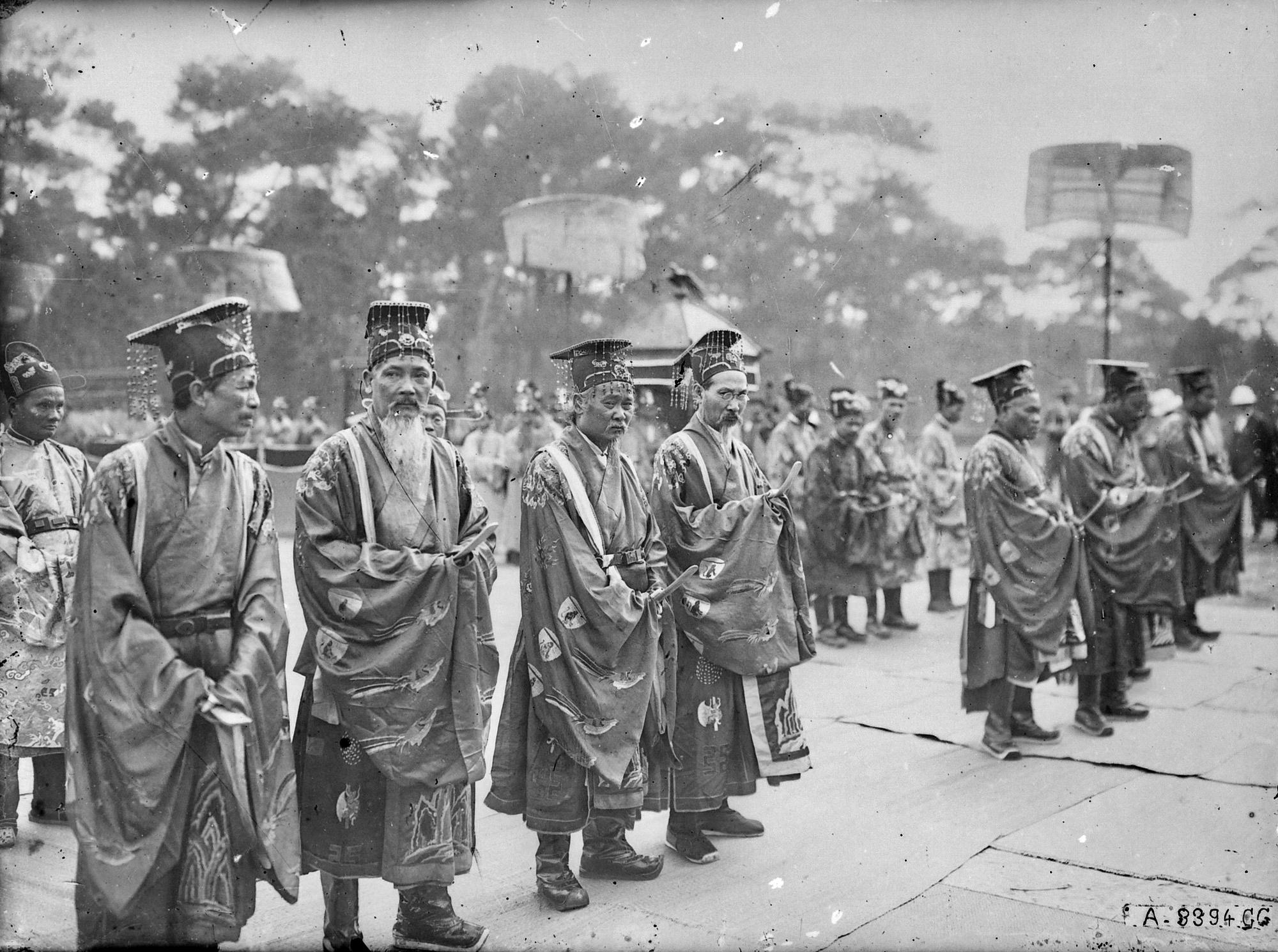
Mandarins at Nam Giao

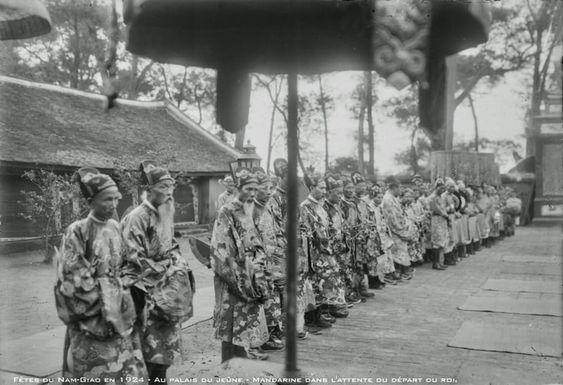
Mandarins at Nam Giao

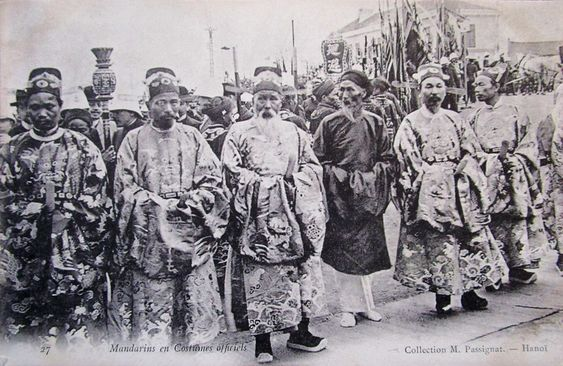
Mandarins at Nam Giao

As the presider arrives with the entourage at the third level while an Nhã nhạc orchestra plays in the background, the ceremony proper begins. First, the silk and gem offerings given by citizens are placed in the altar, followed by the animals, then the cup of wine and other items of importance. As the wine is offered, the military dance My Thang Chi Chuong, honoring the memory of the military heroes of the state in times past, is performed in view of the general public watching at the third level. After which, drums announce the moment as the presiding guest prays in the altar in the name of the people of the city, province and the whole nation of Vietnam for her peace, prosperity and progress, and for good weather and favorable harvests in the next two years. The whole official party kneels at this juncture of the rites. A civil dance then follows by the same dancers who performed earlier, and after this the presider partakes of the offered wine and animal meat for himself, representing the duties of the old Emperors who once performed the sacred rites for many centuries. The symbolic cleaning of the main altars then follows, as many of the offerings and the prayer paper are removed from the altars for ritual burning, while the second level altar remains decked for the later veneration of the public. As the presider departs the main altar, he then proceeds down to the second level for the prayers of departure, bidding the gods farewell until the next ceremony. Following this, he descends then to the third level of the esplanade with the entourage, officially bringing the rites to a close, and the procession then leaves the grounds en route back to the Purple Imperial City via Trai Cung Palace, wherein the entourage retires for the night before continuing the return trip the next morning.

== See also ==
- Temple of Heaven
- Sacrifice to Heaven
