= Soil and grain =

Historic term for the state in East Asia

Chinese name
- Chinese: 社稷
Transcriptions
Standard Mandarin
- Hanyu Pinyin: shèjì
- Wade–Giles: she-chi

Vietnamese name
- Vietnamese alphabet: xã tắc
- Chữ Hán: 社稷

Korean name
- Hangul: 사직
- Hanja: 社稷
Transcriptions
- Revised Romanization: sajik

Japanese name
- Kanji: 社稷
Transcriptions
- Revised Hepburn: shashoku

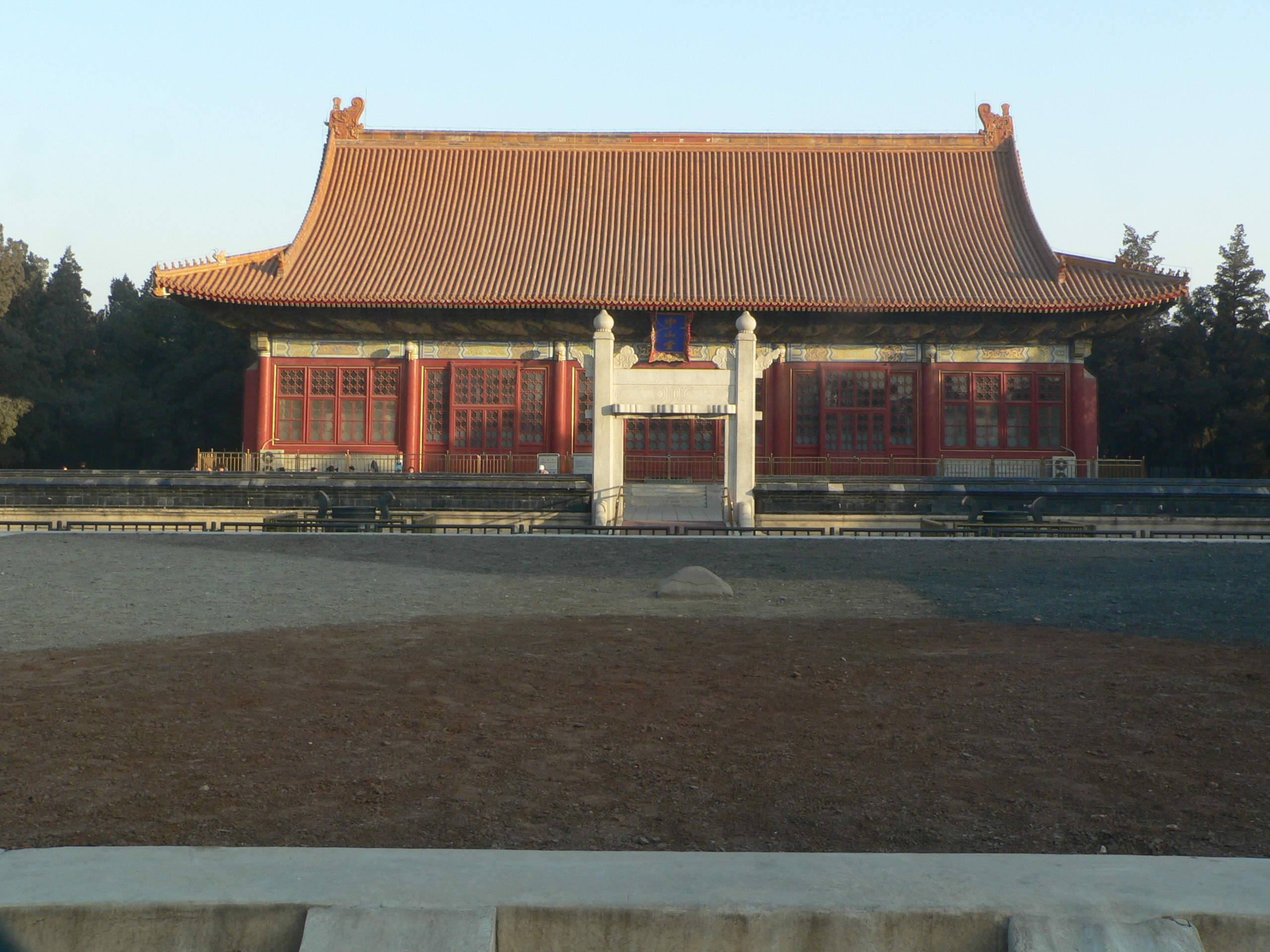
The Beijing Shejitan

Soil and grain was a common Chinese political term in the Sinosphere for the state. During the Chinese Warring States period, ministers defied their rulers by claiming a greater loyalty to the "soil and grain".

A similar concept to sheji is that of the earth deities Tudi and Houtu. It is also linked to Sheshen or deities which are sometimes directly called soil (社).

Houtu is the overlord of all the Tudigongs ("Lord of Local Land"), Sheji ("the State"), Shan Shen ("God of Mountains"), City Gods ("God of Local City"), and landlord gods worldwide.

== Altars ==
Shejitan (社稷坛), the altars of soil and grain, were constructed alongside ancestral altars throughout ancient China. Under the Zhou, their use for formal sacrifice was theoretically restricted to the dukes who ruled the provinces of the empire, while the kings themselves offered their sacrifices to Heaven and Earth at the capital and sacred mountains. The emperors of the Ming and Qing dynasties performed ceremonies of soil and grain to affirm their sovereignty at the Beijing Shejitan.

== In other cultures ==
Korean monarchs of the Joseon dynasty did so at the Seoul Sajikdan. It has also been rendered "gods of soil and grain" in English, owing to its associations of prayer and supernatural possibilities.

== See also ==
- Agriculture in Chinese mythology
- Chinese spiritual world concepts
- Sheshen
- Tian & Di
- Tudigong & Houtu
