= Di'anmen =

Former imperial gate in Beijing, China

Coordinates: 39.9334°N 116.3963°E

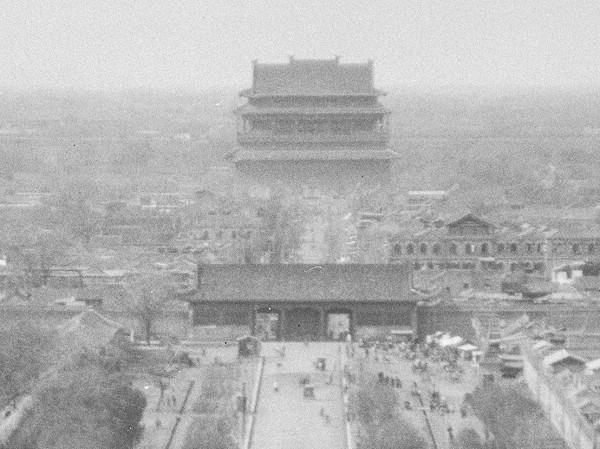
- A wider image of Di'anmen gate leading up to Forbidden City. 1924-1927

Chinese name
- Traditional Chinese: 地安門
- Simplified Chinese: 地安门
- Literal meaning: Gate of Earthly Peace
Transcriptions
Standard Mandarin
- Hanyu Pinyin: Dì'ānmén
- Wade–Giles: Ti-an-men

Beianmen
- Traditional Chinese: 北安門
- Simplified Chinese: 北安门
Transcriptions
Standard Mandarin
- Hanyu Pinyin: Běi'ānmén
- Wade–Giles: Pei-an-men

Manchu name
- Manchu script: ᠨᠠᡳ ᡝᠯᡥᡝ ᠣᠪᡠᡵᡝ ᡩᡠᡴᠠ
- Möllendorff: nai elhe obure duka

Di'anmen (traditional Chinese: 地安門; simplified Chinese: 地安门), previously Bei'anmen (and commonly known as the "back gate"), was an imperial gate in Beijing, China. The gate was first built in the Yongle period of the Ming dynasty, and served as the main northern gate to the Imperial City (the southern gate is the much more famed Tiananmen). The gate was located north of Jingshan Park and south of the Drum Tower. The gate was demolished in 1954. Efforts to restore it have been under way since 2013.

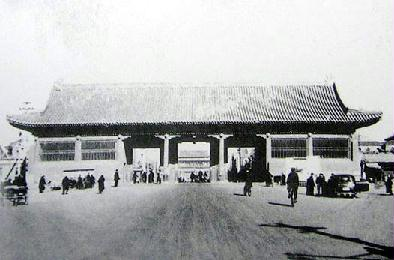
Di'anmen Gate

== History ==
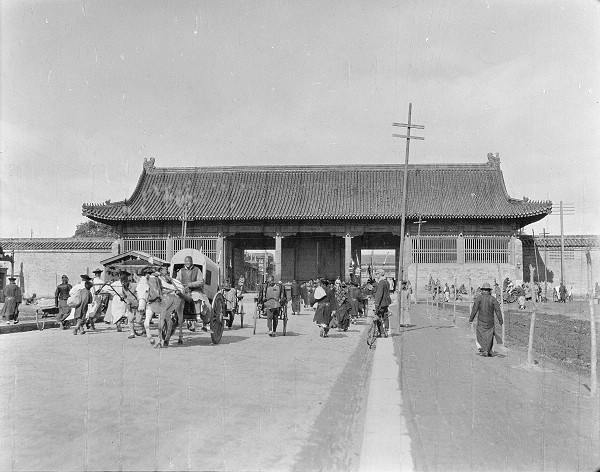
Di'anmen, between 1917 and 1919

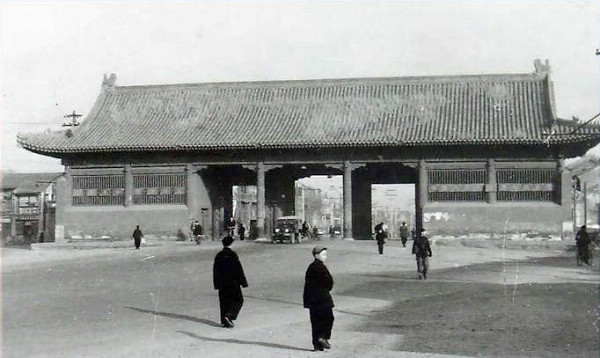
Di'anmen in the 1950s

Di'anmen was built in 1420 during the eighteenth year of the Ming Dynasty, it was originally known as Bei'anmen (北安门). In 1651 (eight year of Shunzhi) during the Qing Dynasty, Bei'anmen was changed to Di'anmen (地安门). It was rebuilt in 1652 (ninth year of Shunzhi). The building overall is a palace gate style brick and wood structure, with seven wide faces, three central rooms for passages and 2 duty rooms on the left and right, this structure is exactly the same as the Xi'anmen.

During the Republic of China in 1913 and 1923, in order to facilitate transportation, the imperial walls on the east and west side of Di'anmen were demolished.

During the early years of the People's Republic of China (from the end of 1954 to February 1955), in order to improve road traffic, both the Di'anmen Gate and the Yanchi Tower were demolished.

In 1955, some prominent figures questioned the demolition of Di'anmen so the relevant departments numbered the doors, windows, pillars, beams, purlins and other components obtained from the demolition of Di'anmen and transported them to the Temple of Heaven together with bricks, stones and glazed tiles. There was a plan to rebuild the Di'anmen and the Yanchi Tower on the north side of the Temple of Heaven. However this was plan was halted after a fire in the Temple of Heaven burned up the wooden components of the Di'anmen and Yanchi Tower. The materials obtained from the demolition were later used to build the north gate of the Temple of Heaven.

In 2004, Wang Canchi, a member of the Beijing Municipal Conference, formally submitted a proposal to the Beijing Municipal Committee of the Chinese People's Political Consultative Conference regarding the restoration of Di'anmen.

In 2005, several literary historians proposed the restoration of the Di'anmen and Yanchi Towers. In 2011, the Beijing Municipal Administration of Cultural Heritage launched the Central Axis Cultural Relics Protection Project, planning to restore the Yanchi tower and Di'anmen, but no construction was begun. In 2012, Beijing launched the "Restoration Project of Landmark Historic Buildings in Famous Cities", which included restoration of the Yanchi Tower and Di'anmen . On May 16, 2013, the Yanchi tower and Di'anmen restoration project started; the main project was completed in August 2014.

== Yanchi Towers ==
The Yanchi towers (simplified Chinese: 雁翅楼; traditional Chinese: 雁翅樓; pinyin: yànchìlóu) was originally on the east and west side of the Di'anmen Inner Street in Di'anmen. The two Towers that were built at the same time as Di'anmen was originally for the offices for three banners of the Internal Affairs Office as well as functioning as a guard post of the imperial city. In 1924, some eunuchs temporarily lived in the Yanchi Tower when Emperor Puyi was expelled from the Forbidden City. Both towers are of brick-and-concrete, covered with yellow glazed tiles, with each building covering about 300 m^{2}. In 1954, the two Towers were demolished at the same time.

From 2013 to 2014, the restoration of the Yanchi towers was carried out. However, due to the impact of the demolition of Di'anmen gate and the construction and expansion of the roads, the New Yanchi tower could not be in the same architectural style as the original, with only 4 rooms from south to north of the east wing and 10 on the west wing could be restored. To distinguish it from the original, in the plan part of the original hilltop roof was to be changed to a hanging hilltop roof and as well as a sign to explain this.

After its reconstruction, the Yanchi tower has 4 buildings in its east wing and 10 in the west. The total construction area is 1041 square meters, with each room being 4.66 meters long, with an area of about approximately 30 square meters. Its exterior is mainly red with green tiles on the roof, with the bottom of the tiles painted with peonies, auspicious clouds and other patterns. The interior of the tower is mainly yellow. As of August 2014, the rooms are connected and only have pillars and have not yet become independent rooms. The two towers are each preceded by two yards of a 10 rooms in length, surrounding the Yanchi towers.

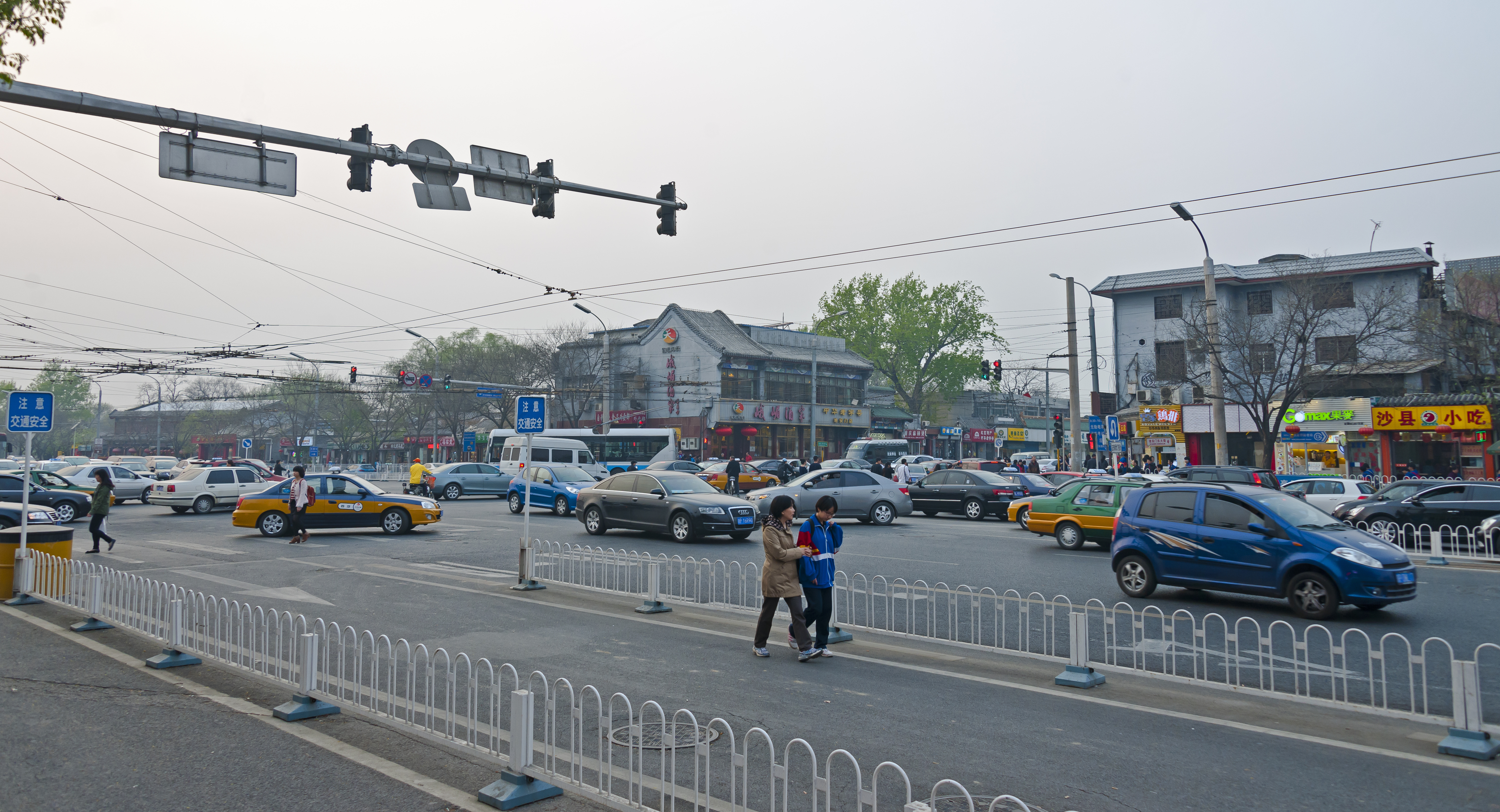
Modern day Di'anmen: East, west and Outer streets

== In popular culture ==
Chen Sheng's "One Night in Beijing": The song's inspiration comes from when Chen Sheng (also known as Bobby Chen) was wandering around Di'anmen whilst drunk. The song itself is about a poignant love story of Di'anmen during the Han–Xiongnu War.

== See also ==
- Tiananmen - the other Gate
- Forbidden City
