= Meridian Gate (Huế) =

Coordinates: 16.4680°N 107.5760°E

- Ngọ Môn
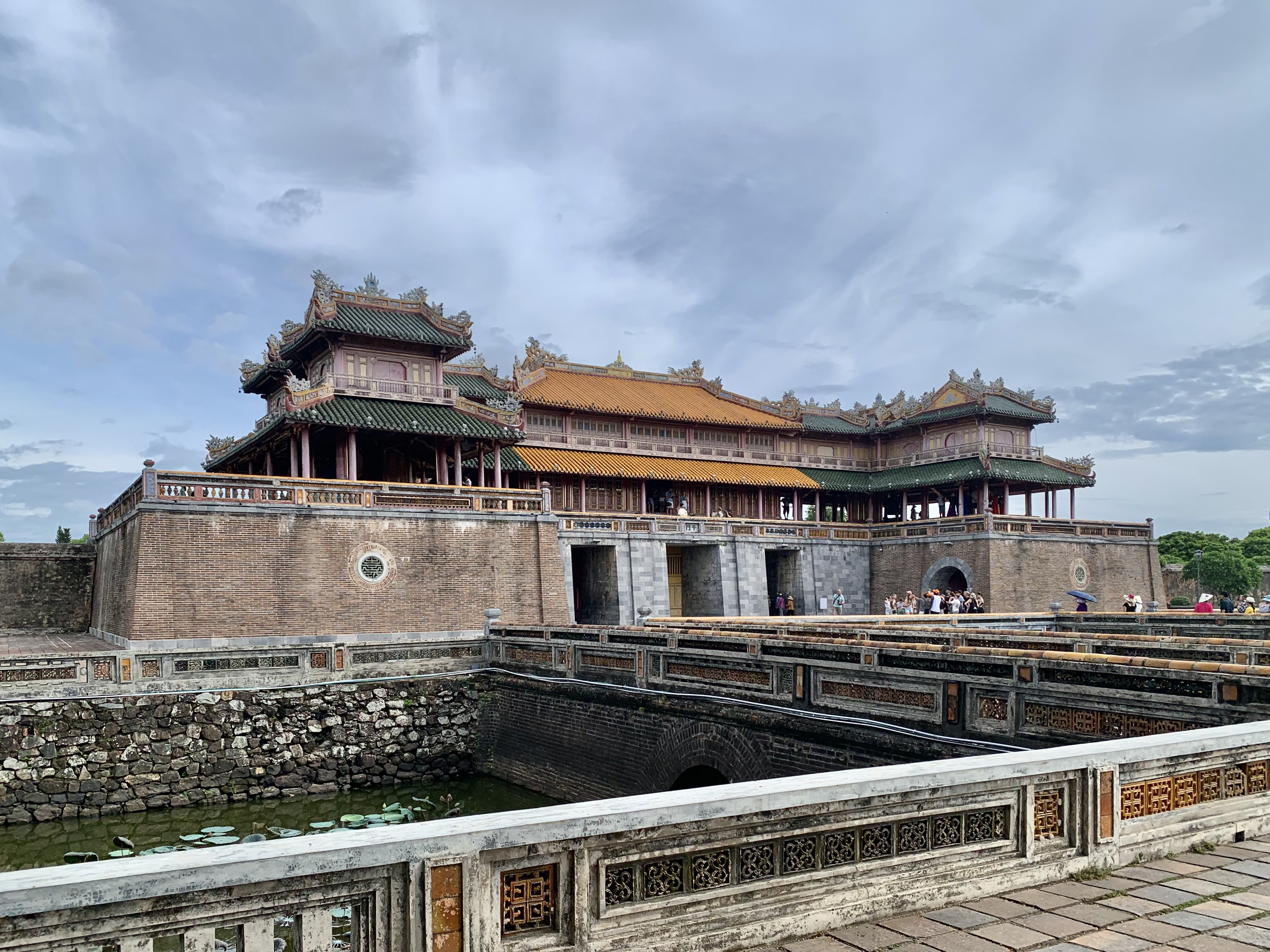
- The Meridian Gate to the Imperial Citadel, Huế, as of 2024
- Interactive map of the Meridian Gate area
- Alternative names: South Gate

General information
- Year built: 1833

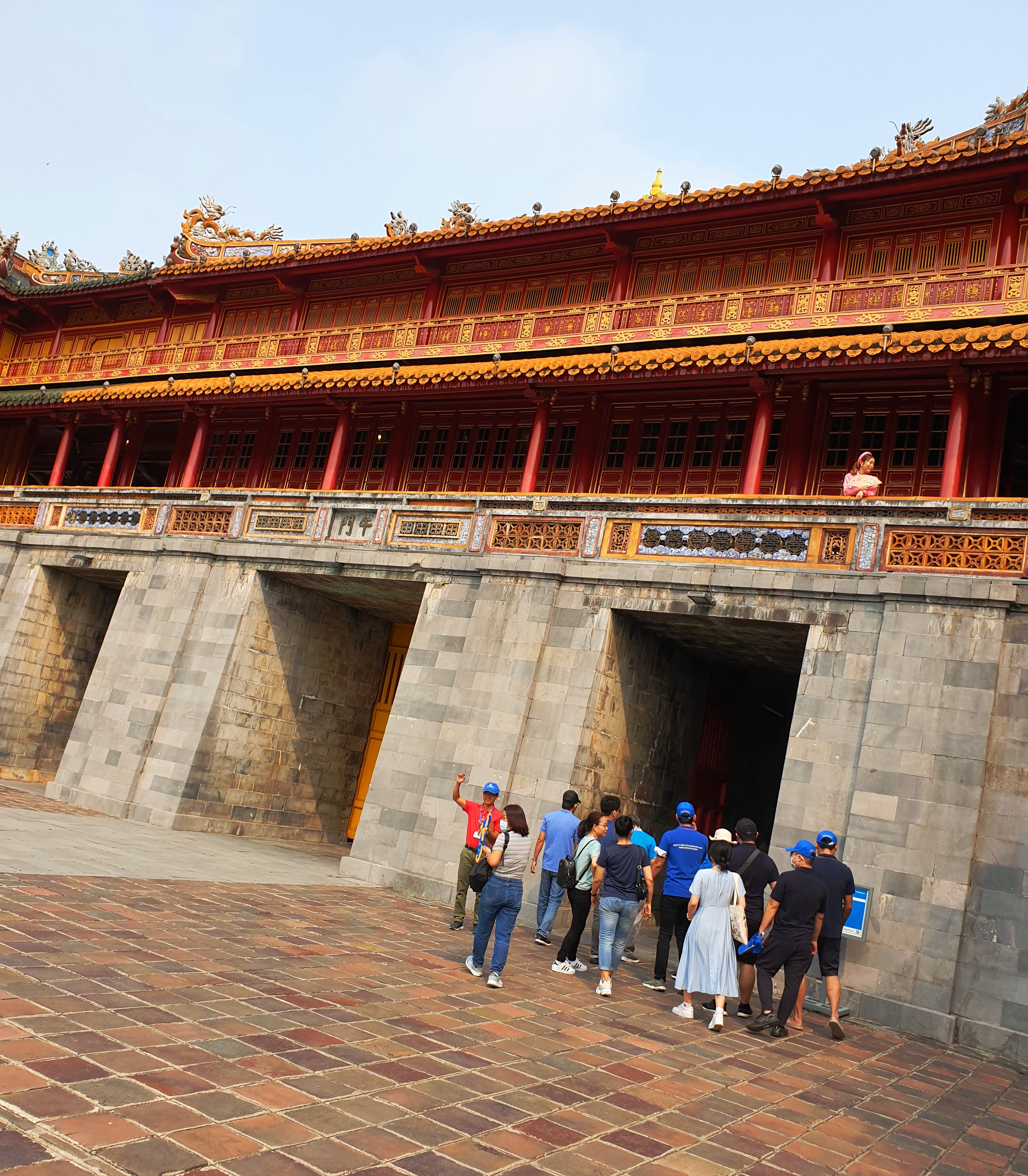
Closer view of the gate

The Meridian Gate (Vietnamese: Ngọ Môn, Chữ Hán: 午門), also known as the South Gate, is the main gate to the Imperial City, Huế, located within the citadel of Huế.

== History ==
=== Origin ===
Previously, this location was the gate named Nam Khuyết Đài (南闕臺) built in the early Gia Long period. On the top was the main keep named Càn Nguyên Điện (乾元殿), with two gates on both sides, Tả Đoan Môn (左端門) and Hữu Đoan Môn (右端門). In the 14th year of Minh Mang (1833), the emperor started to reorganize the entire architectural layout of the Imperial City, Nam Khuyết Đài was completely dissolved to make room for the construction of Meridian Gate. According to the Book of Changes, the south is the direction reserved for emperor to "listen to the world and rule wisely" (Chinese: 而聽天下, 向明而治, roughly translated: facing the light to listen to the world and rule wisely). Meridian Gate was constructed in 1833 under the rule of emperor Minh Mạng, it was used by the sovereign as an observation deck for troop parades and ceremonies. It was modeled after the Meridian Gate of the Forbidden City in Beijing, China. Like the original in Beijing, the Meridian Gate in Huế is composed of a main central section and two protruding wings, representing que towers, traditional towers marking the entrance of palaces, temples and tombs.

The gate is divided into two levels: the stone and brick fortress-like base structure, and the more elaborate, palace-like upper level.

The ground level has five entrances, of which the centre one was always reserved for the monarch's use only. The two, slightly smaller, side entrances were reserved for mandarins, soldiers and horses. The two small arched entrances on the side were for the rest and commoners.

The upper level consists of the "Five-Phoenix Pavilion" (Lầu Ngũ Phụng). From the main hall, the emperor would watch troop movements and his subjects bringing homage. The pavilion's roof is decked in imperial yellow, glazed ceramic roof tiles. On the roof tiles are various animals and creatures to ward off evil. The main hall is flanked by two side pavilions, which were reserved for members of the court.

The gate was able to survive the large-scale destruction during the Vietnam War.

== Gallery ==
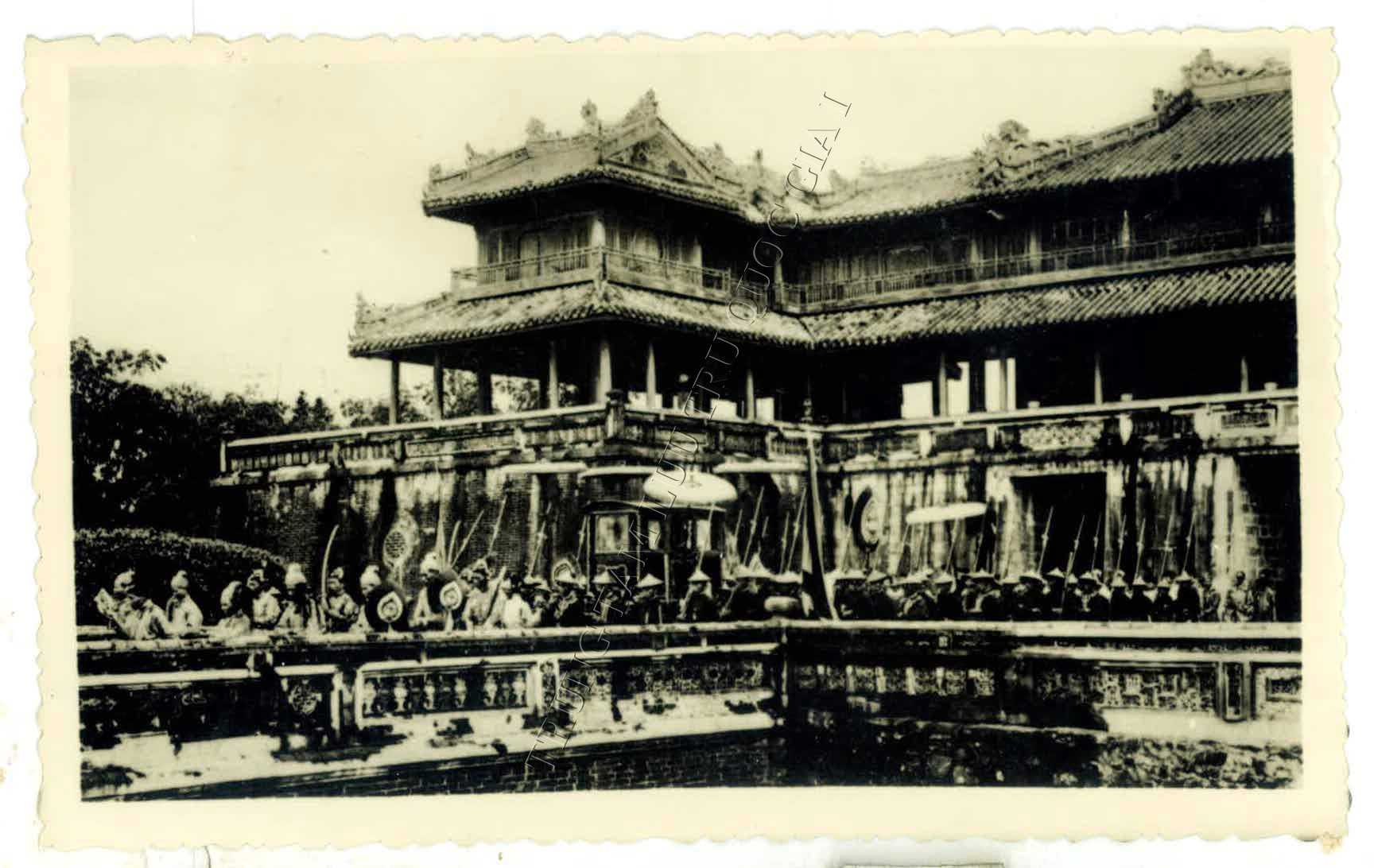
Meridian Gate during Nam Giao ceremony in Bảo Đại's era.

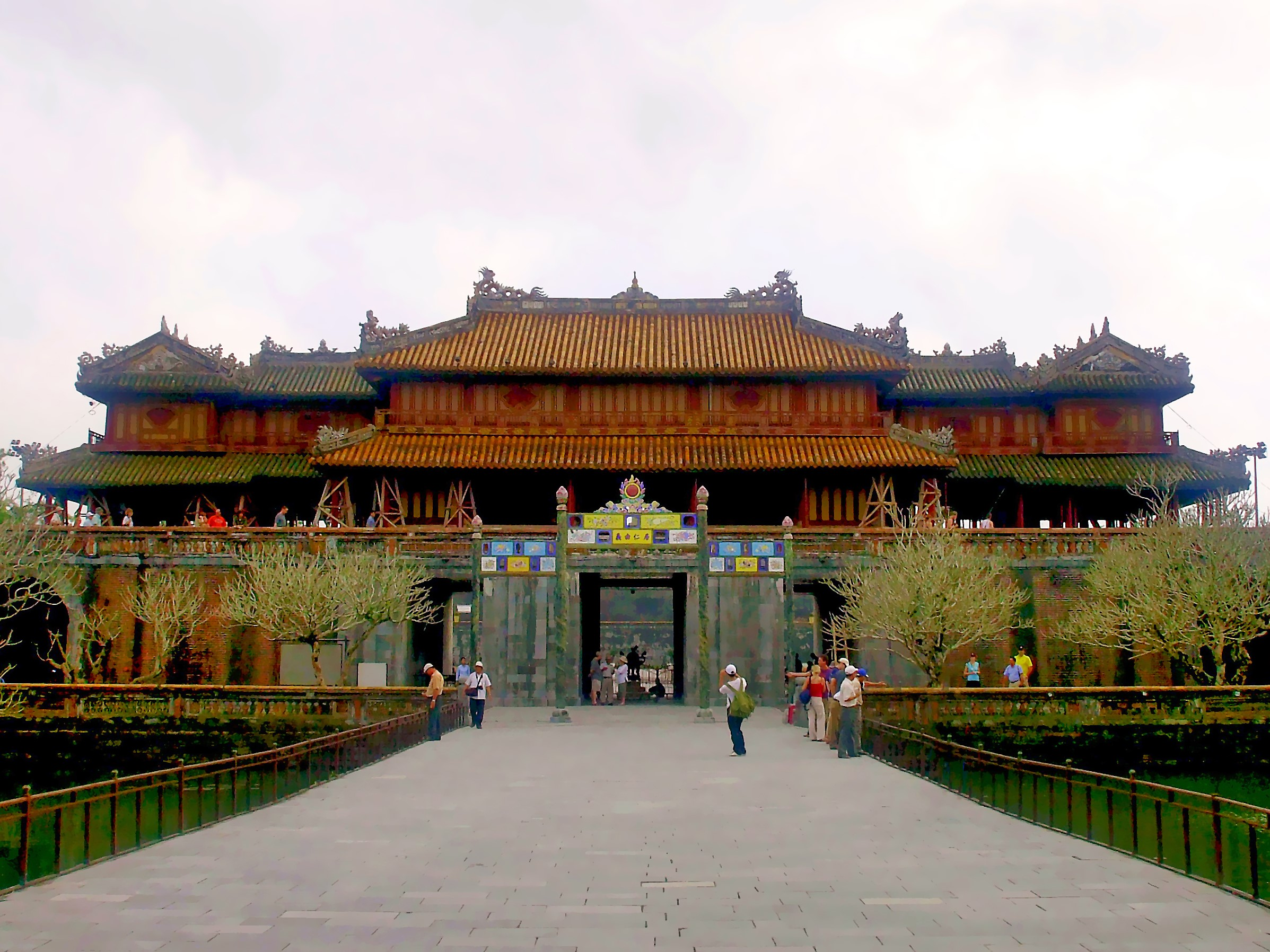
Ngọ Môn (front view).

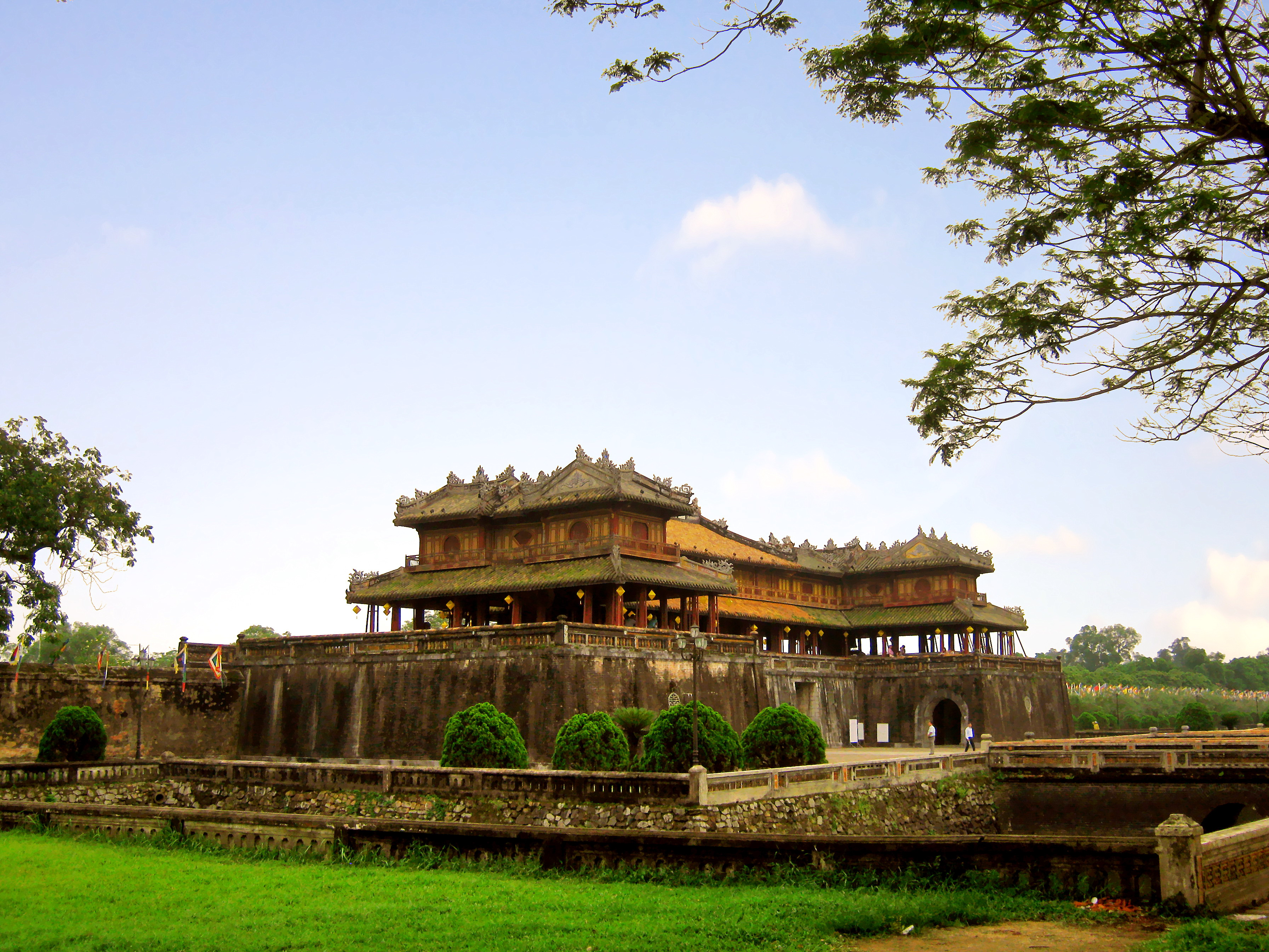
Ngũ Phụng Tower is clearly visible against the light blue sky.

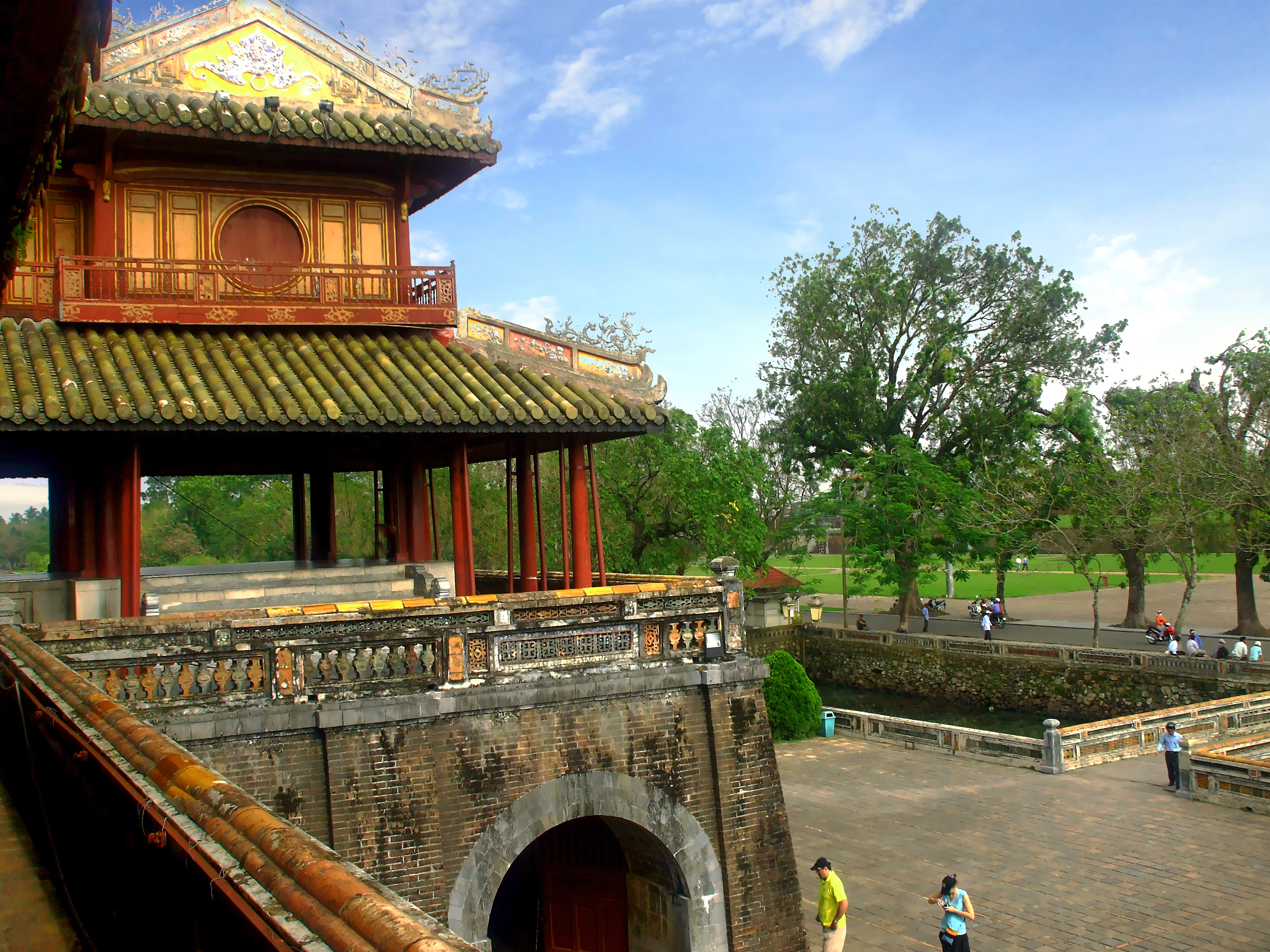
A corner of Ngọ Môn.

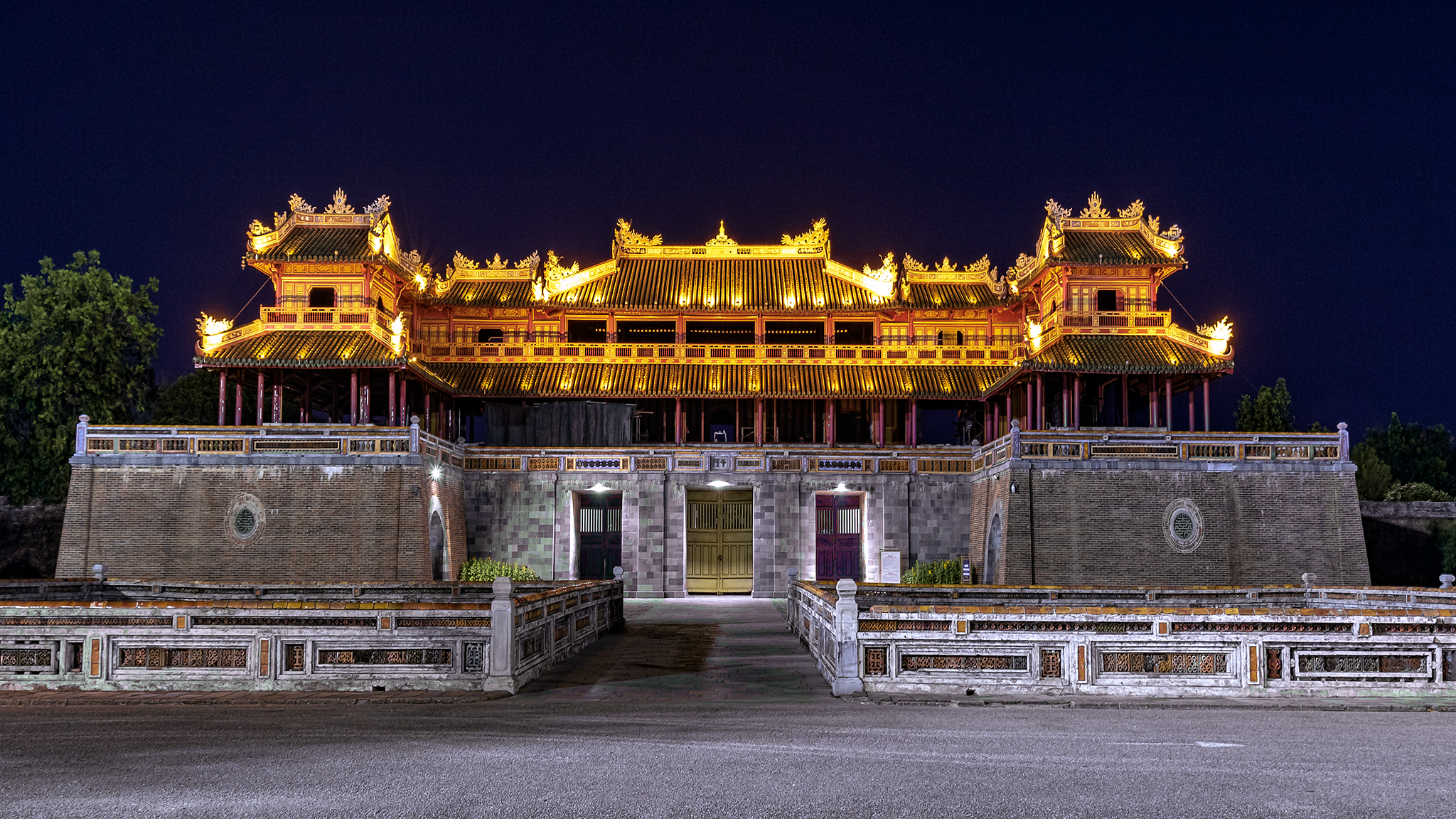
Ngọ Môn at night.

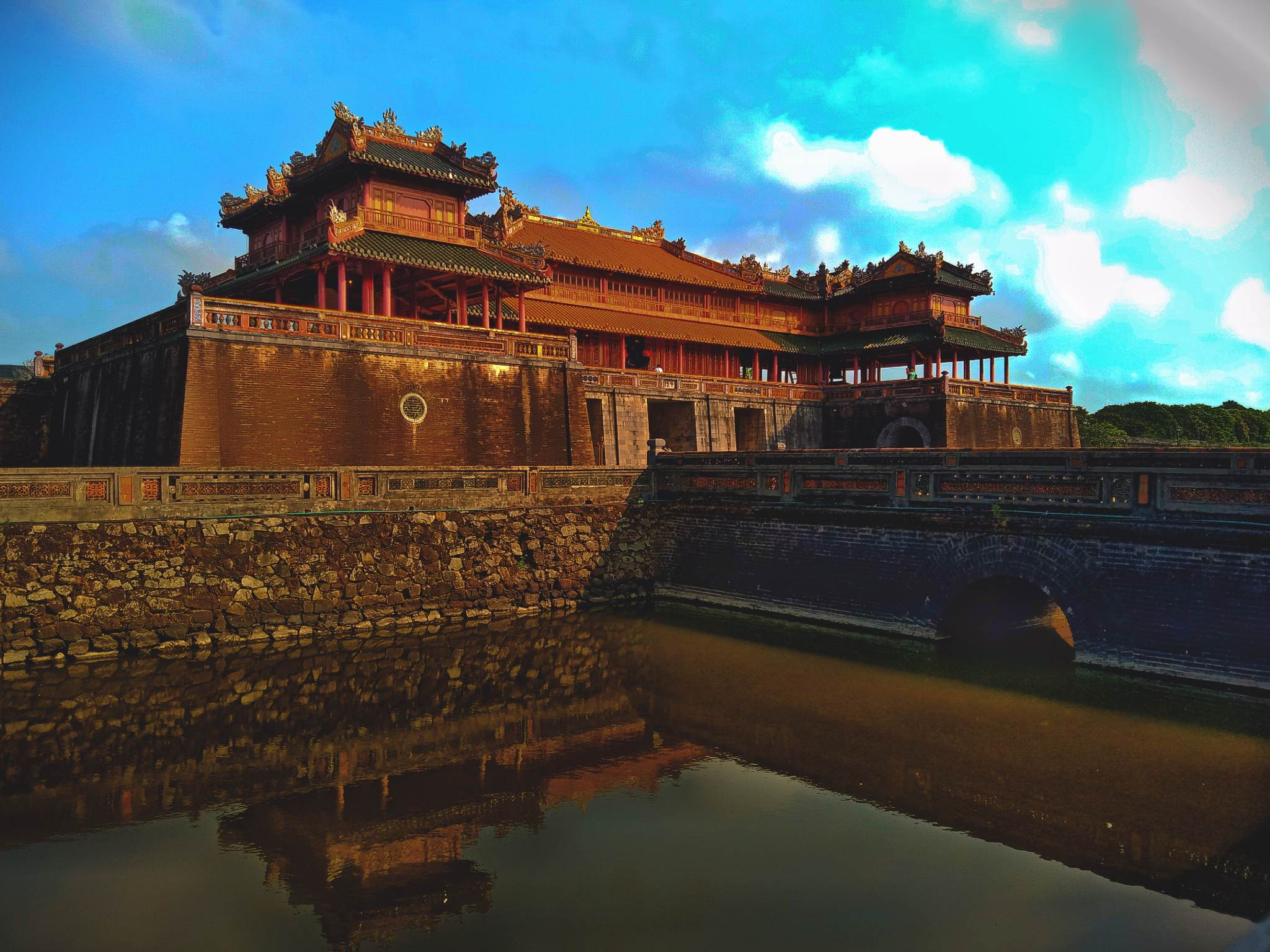
A corner of Ngọ Môn.
