= Duanmen =

Gate in Beijing, China

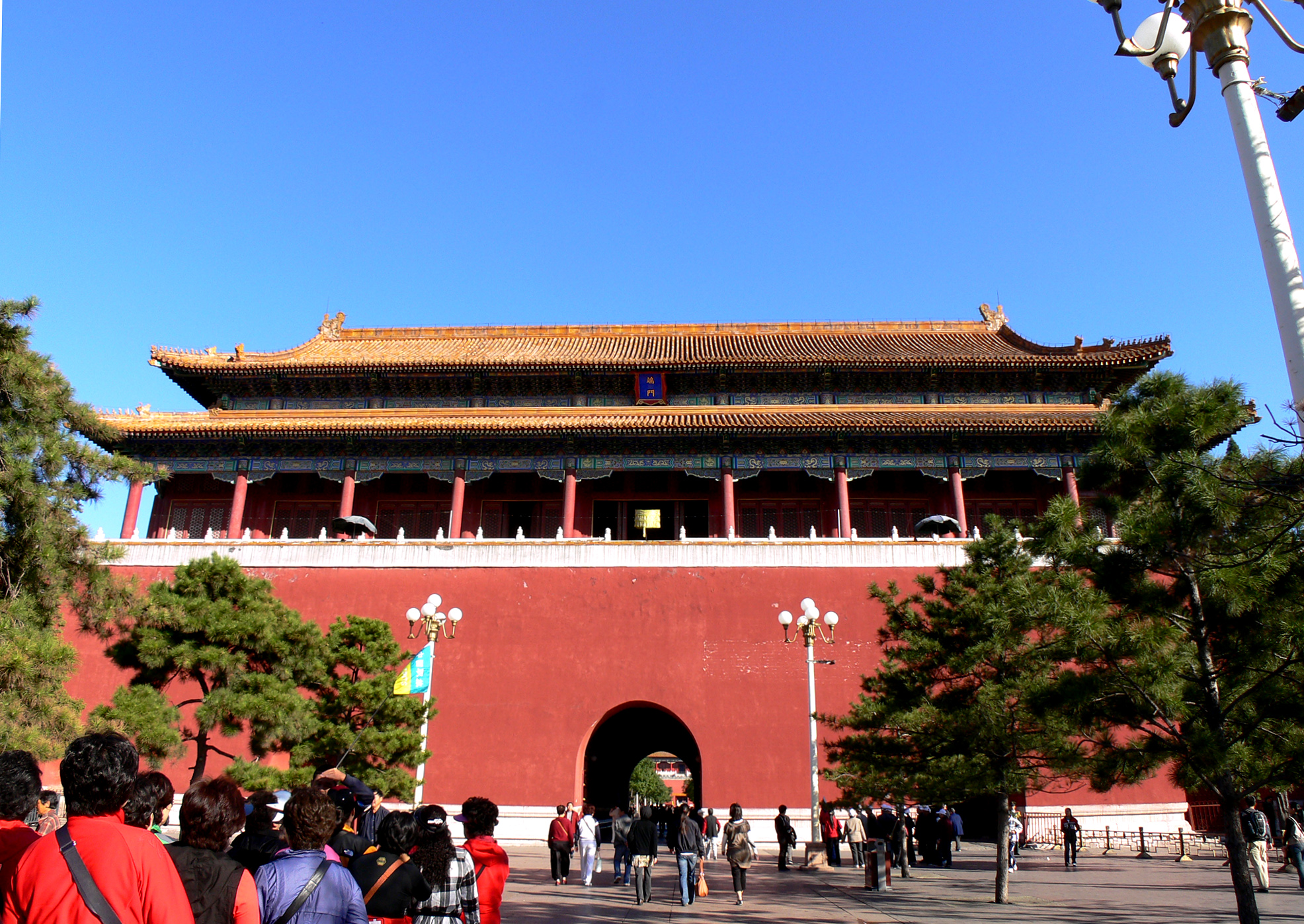
- Interactive map of the Duanmen area

General information
- Location: Beijing, China
- Coordinates: 39°54′32.4″N 116°23′27.6″E

Chinese name
- Traditional Chinese: 端門
- Simplified Chinese: 端门
Transcriptions
Standard Mandarin
- Hanyu Pinyin: duān mén

Duanmen, also known as the Gate of Uprightness, or Upright Gate, 端門 is a gate in Beijing's Imperial City. It is located south of the Forbidden City. Proceeding north from the entrance to the Imperial City, it is the next gate after the Tian'anmen, or Gate of Heavenly Peace, and has a similar structure to that gate. The next gate further north is the Meridian Gate, which is the southern and main gate to the Forbidden City itself.
