= Que (tower) =

Ceremonial gate tower in China

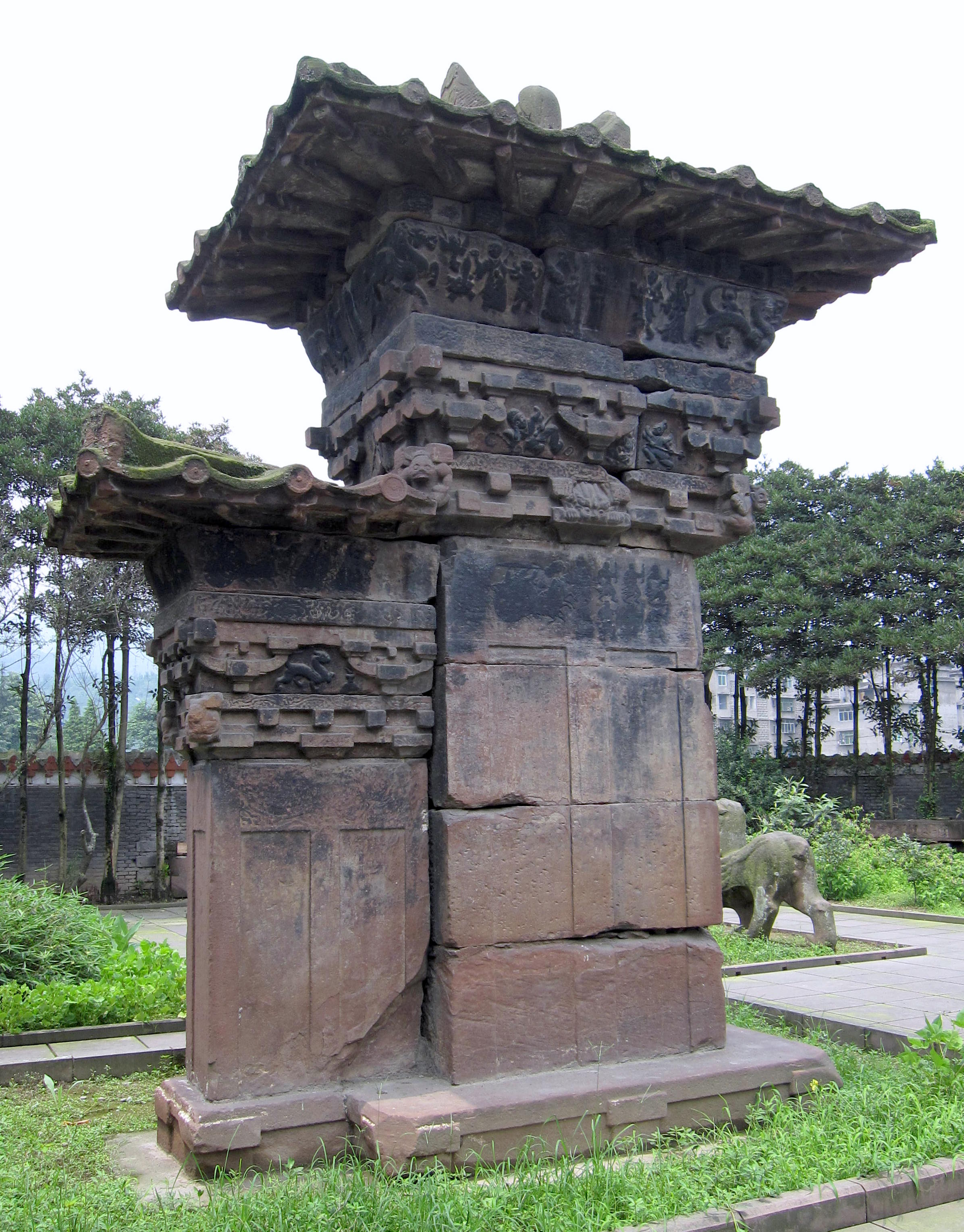
A stone-carved que, 6 m (20 ft) in total height, located at the tomb of Gao Yi in Ya'an, Sichuan province, Eastern Han dynasty. Notice the stone-carved decorations of roof tile eaves, despite the fact that Han dynasty stone que (part of the walled structures around tomb entrances) lacked wooden or ceramic components (but often imitated wooden buildings with ceramic roof tiles).

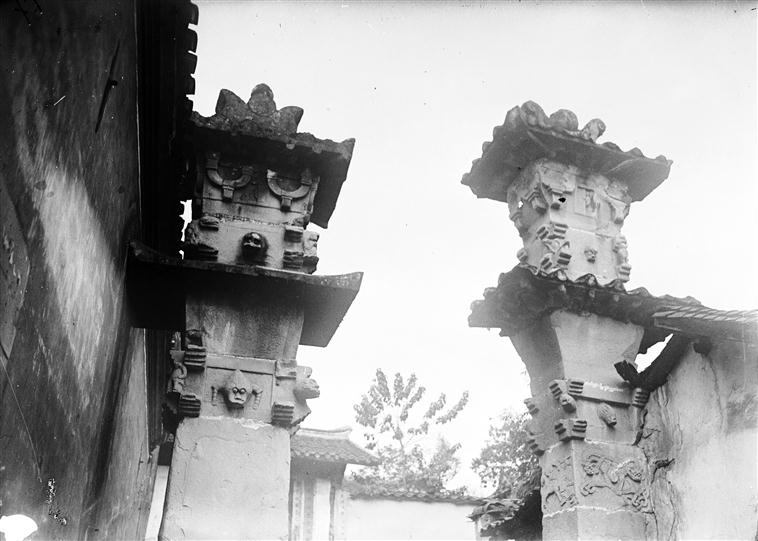
Eastern Han stone-carved que pillar gates of Dingfang, Zhong County, Chongqing that once belonged to a temple dedicated to the Warring States period general Ba Manzi

The que (simplified Chinese: 阙; traditional Chinese: 闕; pinyin: què; Jyutping: kyut3) is a freestanding, ceremonial gate tower in traditional Chinese architecture. First developed in the Zhou dynasty (1046–256 BC), que towers were used to form ceremonial gateways to tombs, palaces and temples throughout pre-modern China down to the Qing dynasty (1644–1912). The use of que gateways reached its peak during the Han dynasty (202 BC – 220 AD), and today they can often be seen as a component of an architectural ensemble (a spirit way, shendao) at the graves of high officials during China's Han dynasty. There are also some que found in front of temples. Richly decorated, they are among the most valuable surviving relics of the sculpture and architecture of that period.

== Que in the Han dynasty ==
It is thought that the que familiar to us are stone reproductions of the free-standing wooden and/or earthen towers which were placed in pairs in front of the entrances to the palaces, temples, and government buildings of the period (already known during the Qin dynasty). Such free-standing towers, serving as markers of the symbolic boundary of a palace's or temple's premises, had developed from gate towers that were an integral part of a building or a city wall. None of such que in front of buildings have survived, but images of buildings with such towers in front of them can be seen on extant brick reliefs in Han dynasty tombs, such as the one in Yinan tombs in Yinan County, Shandong).

At the spirit roads, the que also appeared in pairs, one on each side of the road. During the time of their popularity, the que were usually the largest and most expensive component of the spirit way; such a tower could cost 4 times as much as a stone lion, or 10 times as much as a memorial stele.

The symbolic meaning of a tomb que may have been based on that of the que in front of a palace and building. Here, it would symbolize the passage of the soul into the world of the spirits. A tall vertical structure, que would at the same time symbolize a link with heaven.

The use of que on spirit ways declined after the fall of the Eastern Han. Some que from the 3rd and 4th century have been found in Sichuan, but, as Ann Paludan notes, only in the province's more remote and presumably culturally conservative parts. Generally, after the Eastern Han era, the role of que on the spirit way was assumed by huabiao pillars.

Around 30 que have survived to the present day. Most of them are in Sichuan; a few in Henan and Shandong. According to Ann Paludan, this distribution may be explained by two reasons. First, there may have been more stone que produced in these regions in the first place, due to the ready availability of stone and the tradition of stone-working craft; meanwhile elsewhere wooden que were built, which have not survived. Second, Sichuan has more remote, hard to access areas, which is exactly where many of the Han dynasty que have managed to survive. The locations around the imperial capitals, where the Eastern Han imperial mausolea were located, saw more intensive level of destruction over the almost 2000 years that have elapsed since that era, and the que constructed there did not have a chance to survive.

Many of the Sichuan que were first made known to the international scholarship by Victor Segalen, who described them during his 1914 expedition.

== Que after the Han dynasty ==
The use of que in tomb architecture and other contexts declined after the Han dynasty but did not disappear. For example, imperial tombs of the Tang dynasty usually featured que, and remnants can still be seen today. The Qianling Mausoleum, the best preserved example, features three sets of que towers arranged sequentially along the spirit way. They also remained in use in front of temples and bridges. In gateways to the imperial palaces, they remained in use down to the end of the imperial era. Ultimately, they were combined with a more conventional gateway to form a single U-shaped structure, where a conventional gate would be connected, via two "arms" extending outwards, to two que towers.

The final two examples of such combined que gates were found as the Meridian Gates, the southern and main entrances to the imperial palaces of Nanjing and Beijing built during the Ming dynasty. The ques in Nanjing were demolished in 1924 to make way for the construction of the Ming palace airfield. The gate in Beijing survives intact. Despite being a single structure, the que is identified distinctly from the gate. Two que pavilions with pyramidal roofs mark out the que from the rest of the gate house. Outside of China, the Meridian Gate in Huế, in Vietnam, has a similar design.

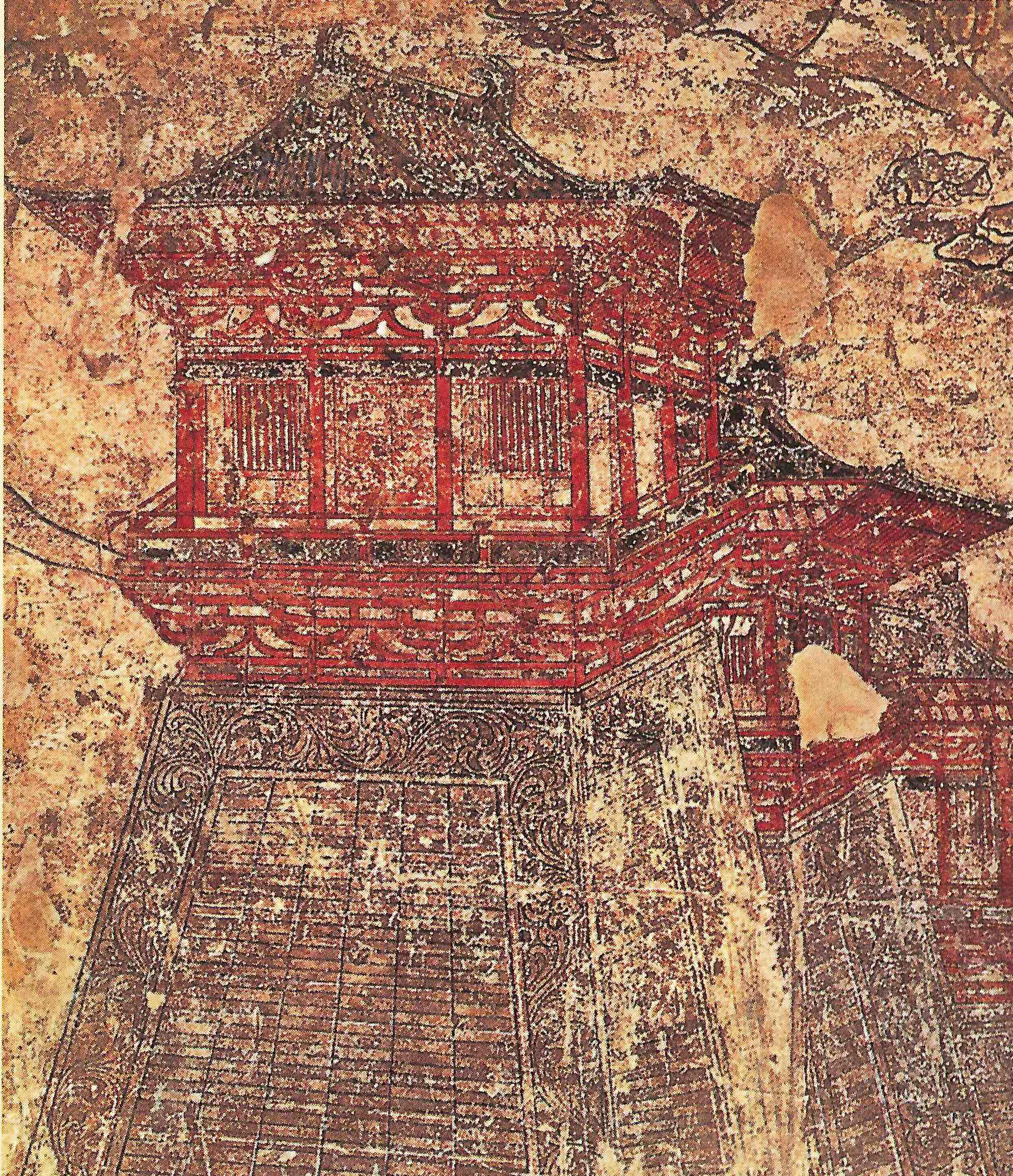
A mural in Prince Yide's tomb (8th century), depicting a que tower along the walls of Chang'an.

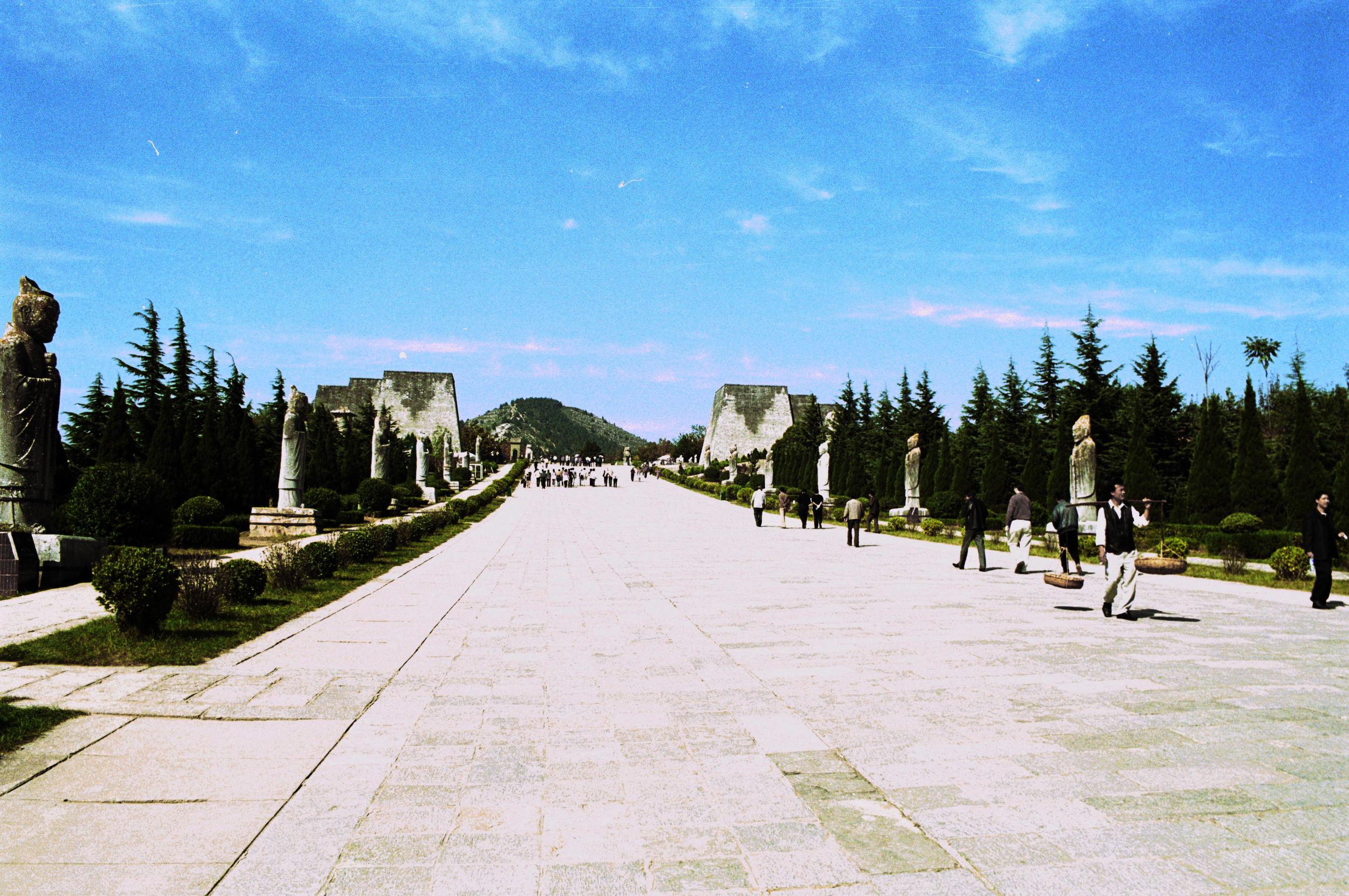
A view down the spirit way of the Qianling mausoleum of the Tang dynasty. Remains of the third set of que towers are visible in the mid-distance. The stone platforms would originally have been topped with pavilion-like structures.

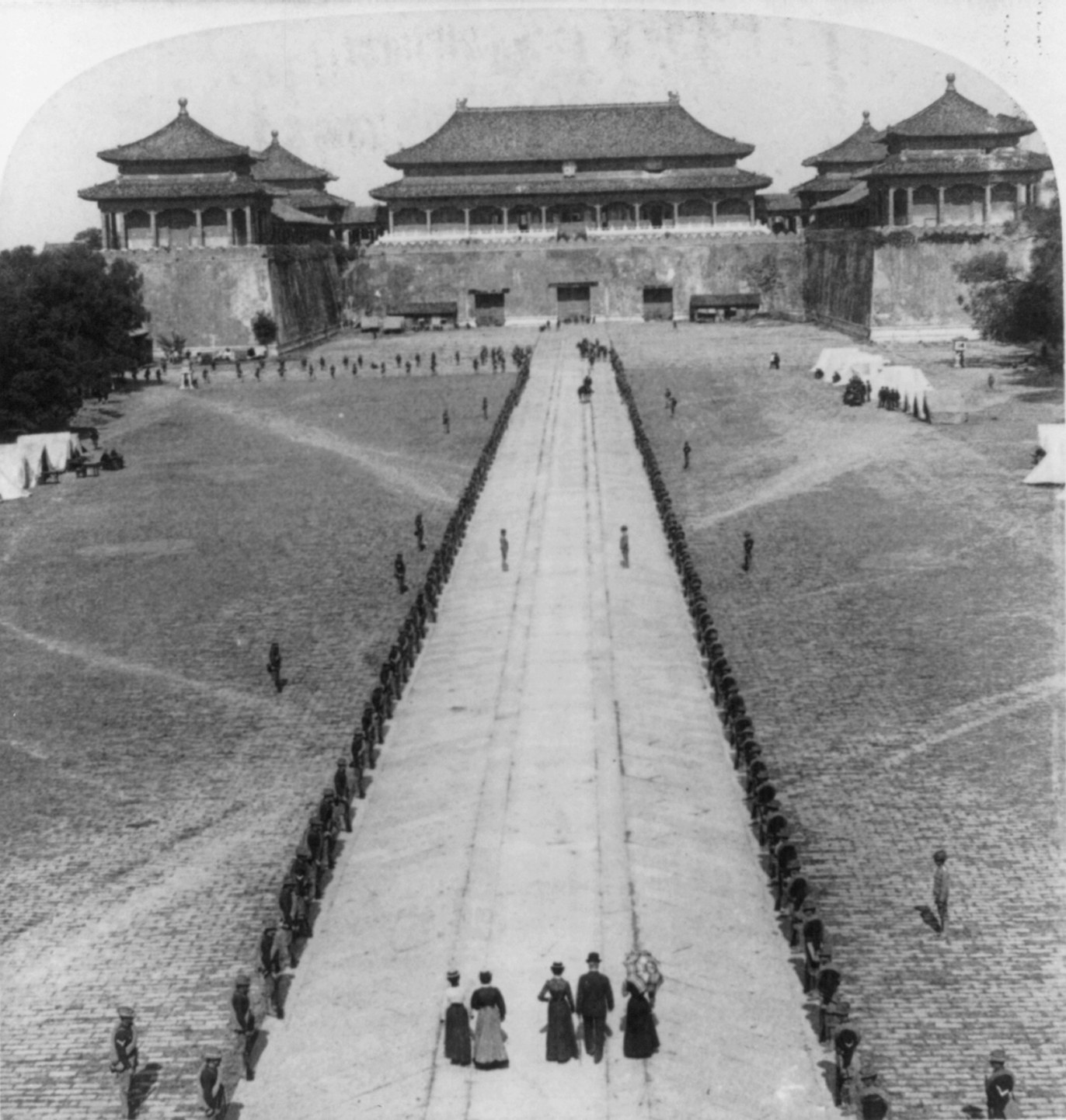
A historic photograph of the Meridian Gate in Beijing, the sole surviving example of an imperial que gate in China, showing the two protruding que wings in combination with the conventional gate in the centre.

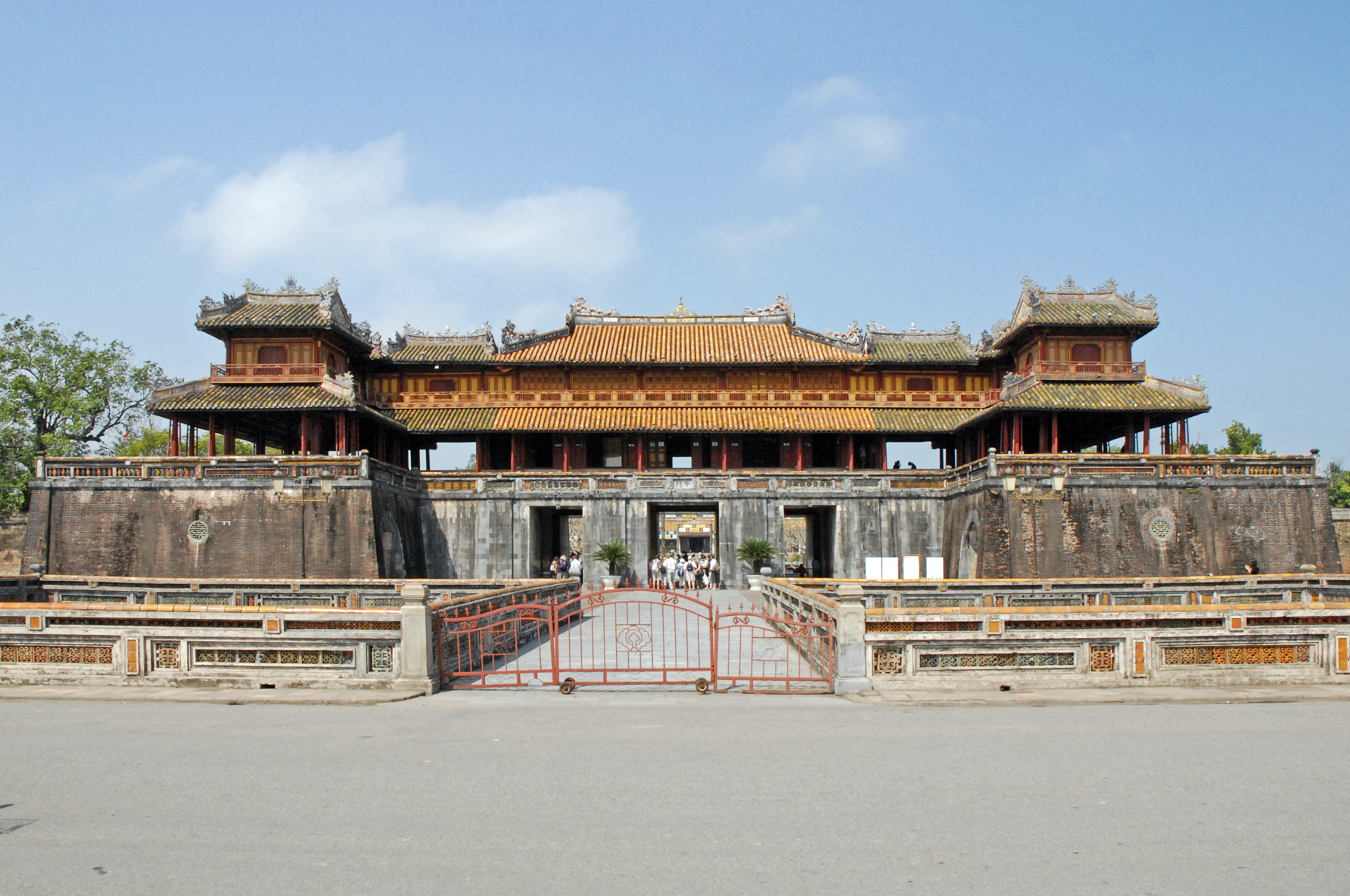
The Meridian Gate in Huế, Vietnam

== Examples ==
- Tomb of Fan Min in Lushan County, Sichuan. This is also where the oldest known tortoise-borne stele is located.
- Mausoleum of the Shen family, Qu County, Sichuan
- Tomb of Gao Yi, Ya'an, Sichuan
- Liye Tower, Zitong County, Sichuan
