= Meridian Gate =

Southern and largest gate of the Forbidden City

- 午门
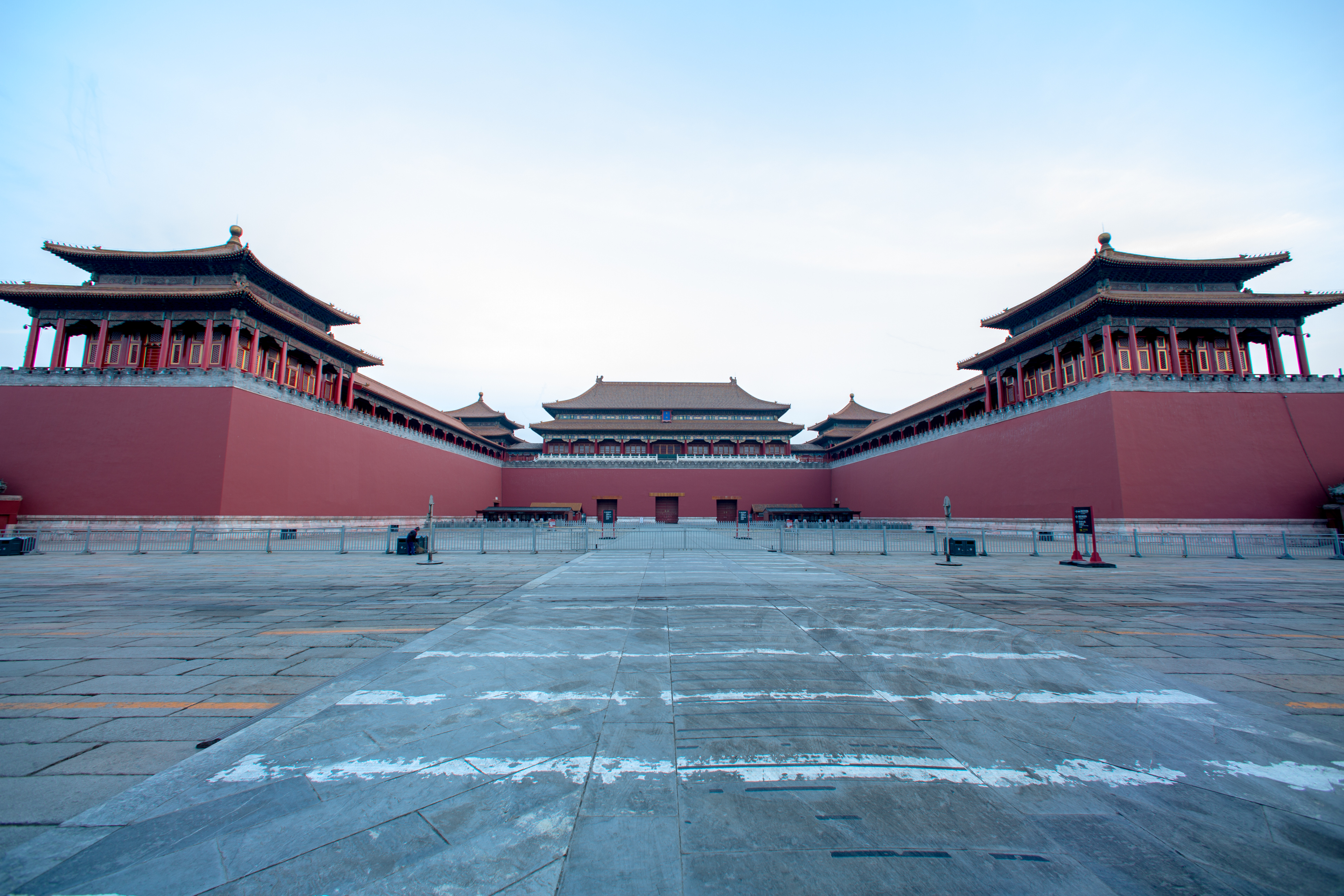
- The Meridian Gate, viewed from the south, in wintertime
- Alternative names: Wumen

General information
- Location: Forbidden City, Beijing, China
- Coordinates: 39°54′45″N 116°23′28″E

The Meridian Gate or Wumen (simplified Chinese: 午门; traditional Chinese: 午門; pinyin: Wǔmén; Manchu: ᠵᡠᠯᡝᡵᡤᡳ
ᡩᡠᠯᡳᠮᠪᠠᡳ
ᡩᡠᡴᠠ; Möllendorff: julergi dulimbai duka) is the southern and largest gate of the Forbidden City in Beijing, China. Unlike the other gates of the Forbidden City, the Meridian Gate has two protruding arms on either side, derived from ancient que towers traditionally used to decorate the main entrances of palaces, temples and tombs.

The gate has five arches: three central arches are close together in the main central section, and the two flanking arches are further apart from the three central arches, and are located between the central section and the protruding arms. The centre arch was formerly reserved for the Emperor alone; the exceptions were the Empress, who could enter it once on the day of her wedding, and the top three scholars of the triennial civil service examinations, who left the exams through the central arch. All other officials and servants had to use the four side arches.

A series of buildings form the superstructure of the gate. The central one is a pavilion of nine bays wide, with double eaves. On each of the protruding sides, a 13 bays-long building with a single eave connects the two pyramidal-roofed pavilions that represented the que towers. Opposite them is the Upright Gate, the principal entrance to the imperial palace grounds. When proceeding northward through the palace grounds, the next major gate encountered is the Gate of Supreme Harmony.

The superstructure of the Meridian Gate is also called the "Five Phoenix Turrets" because it is composed of five buildings. Imperial proclamations and almanacs were issued from the gate house. After successful campaigns, the Emperor received prisoners of war here, sometimes followed by mass decapitations.

An urban myth claims that senior officers were executed here in Imperial China. In reality, only corporal punishment was carried out.

== Gallery ==
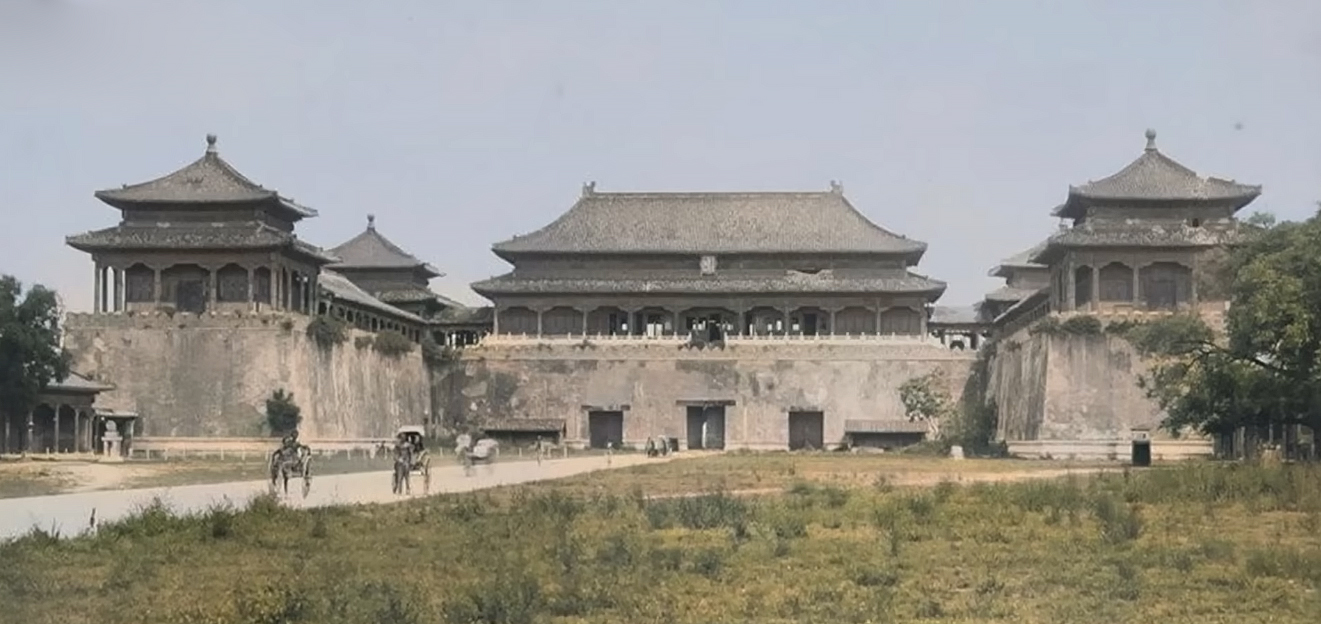
Meridian Gate, pre–1900.

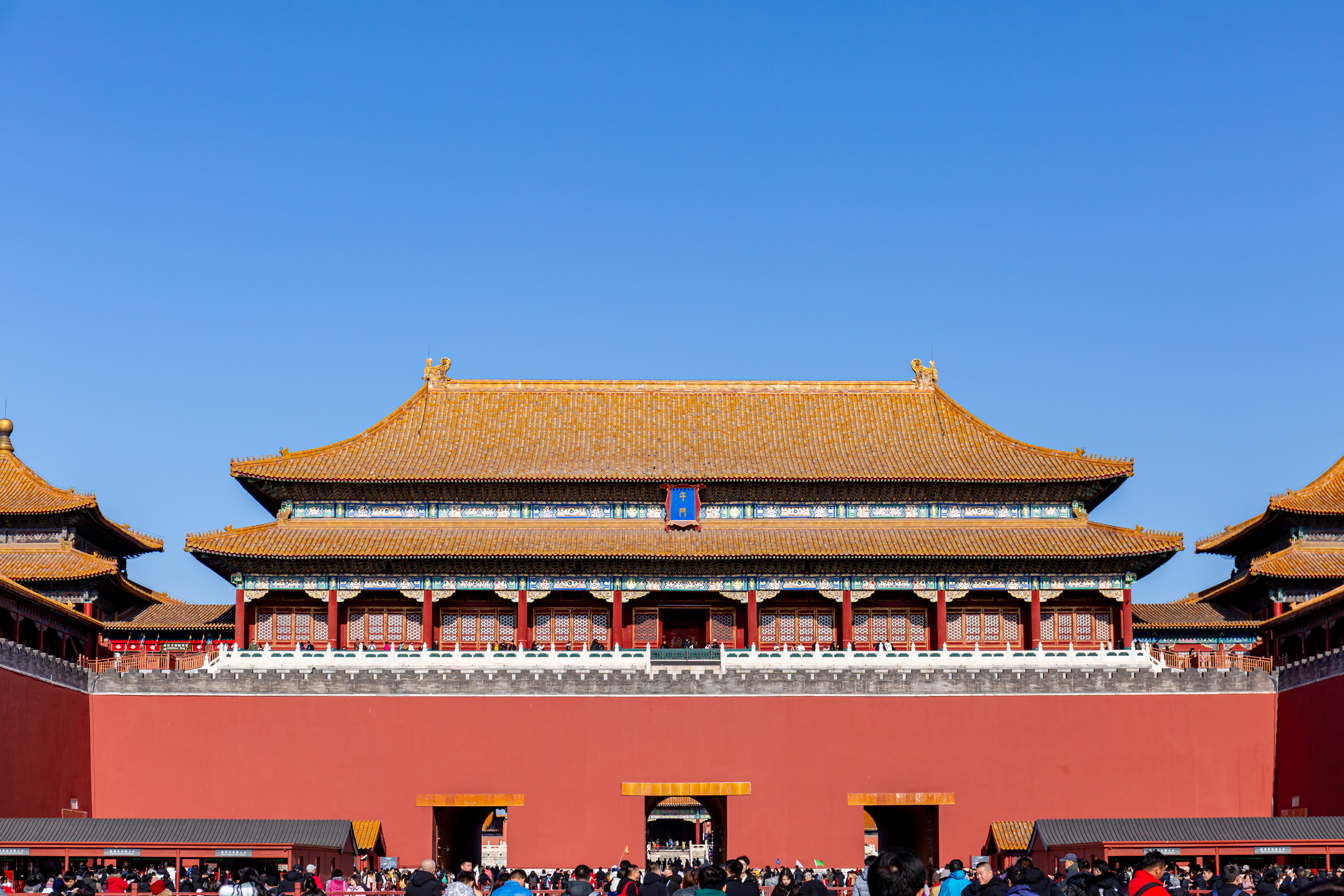
Central-superstructure detail.

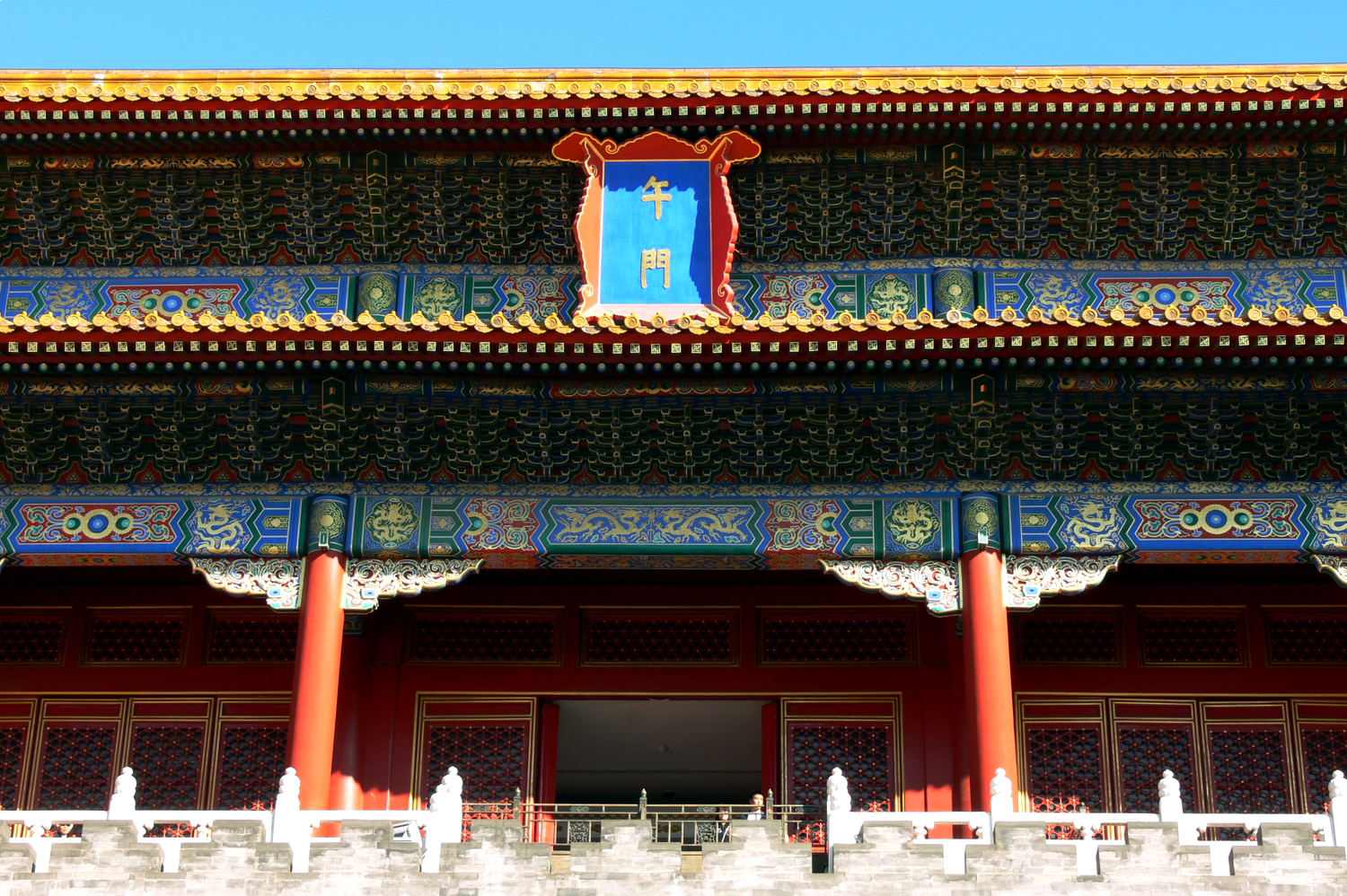

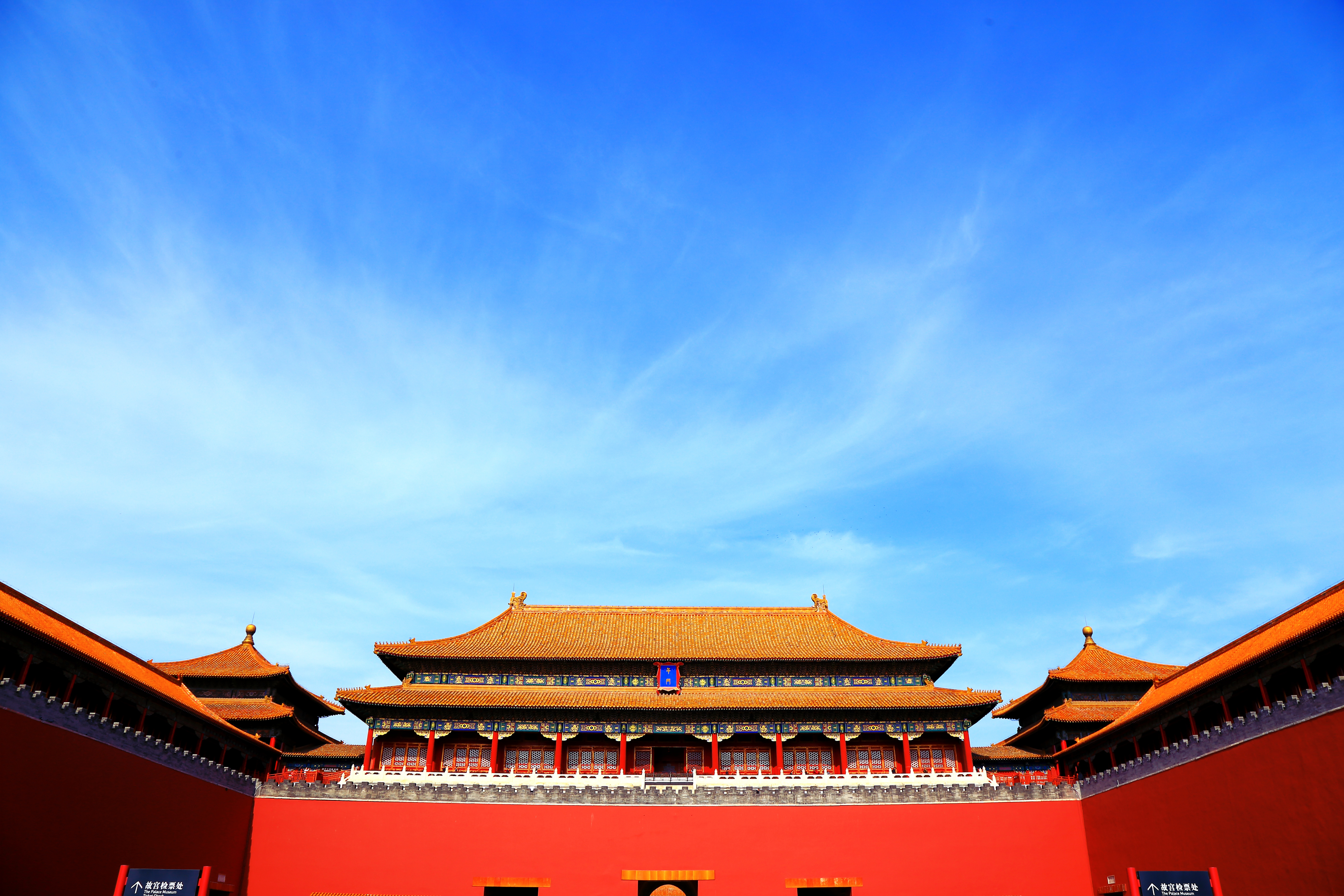
Southern view.

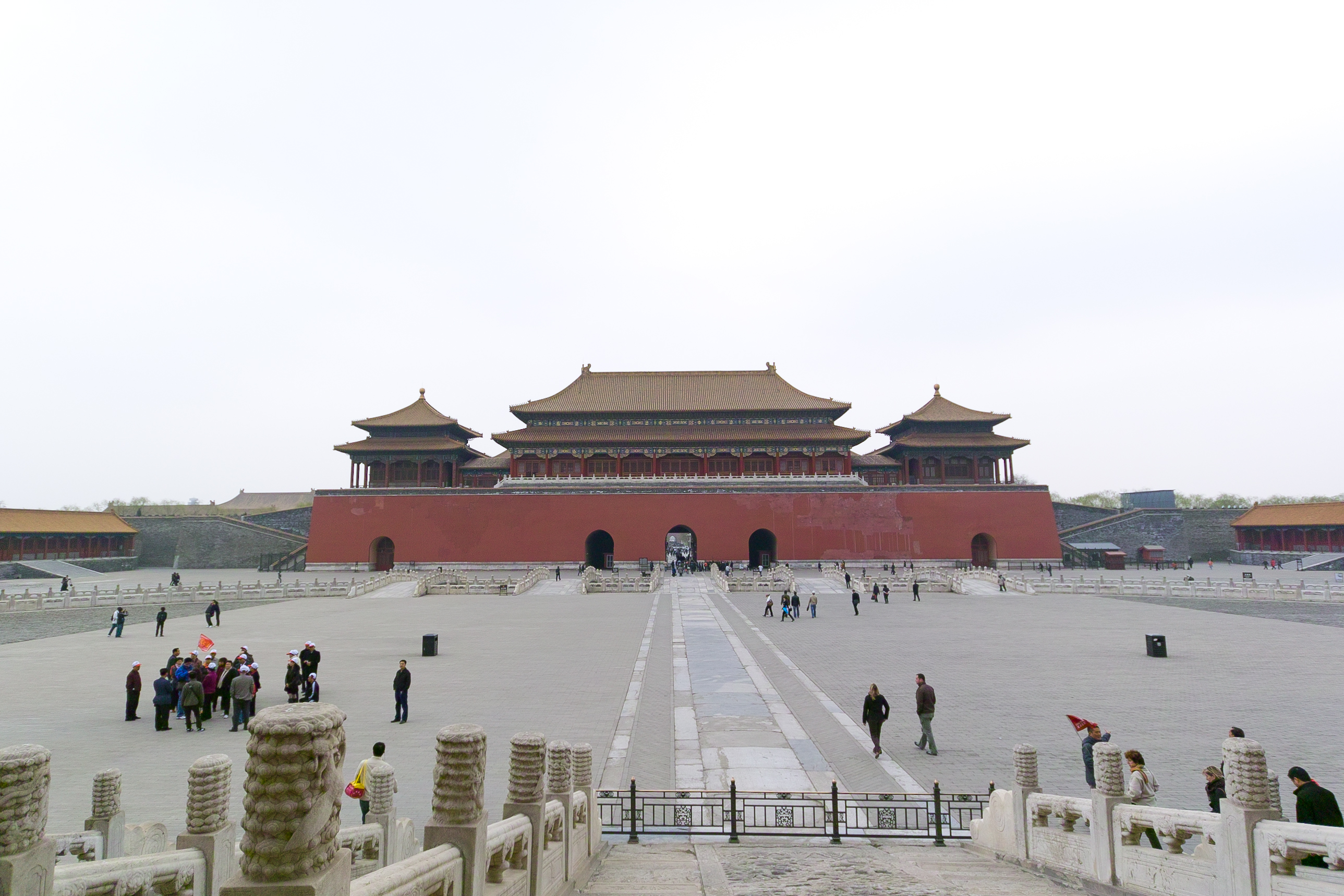
Northern view, showing the five arches.

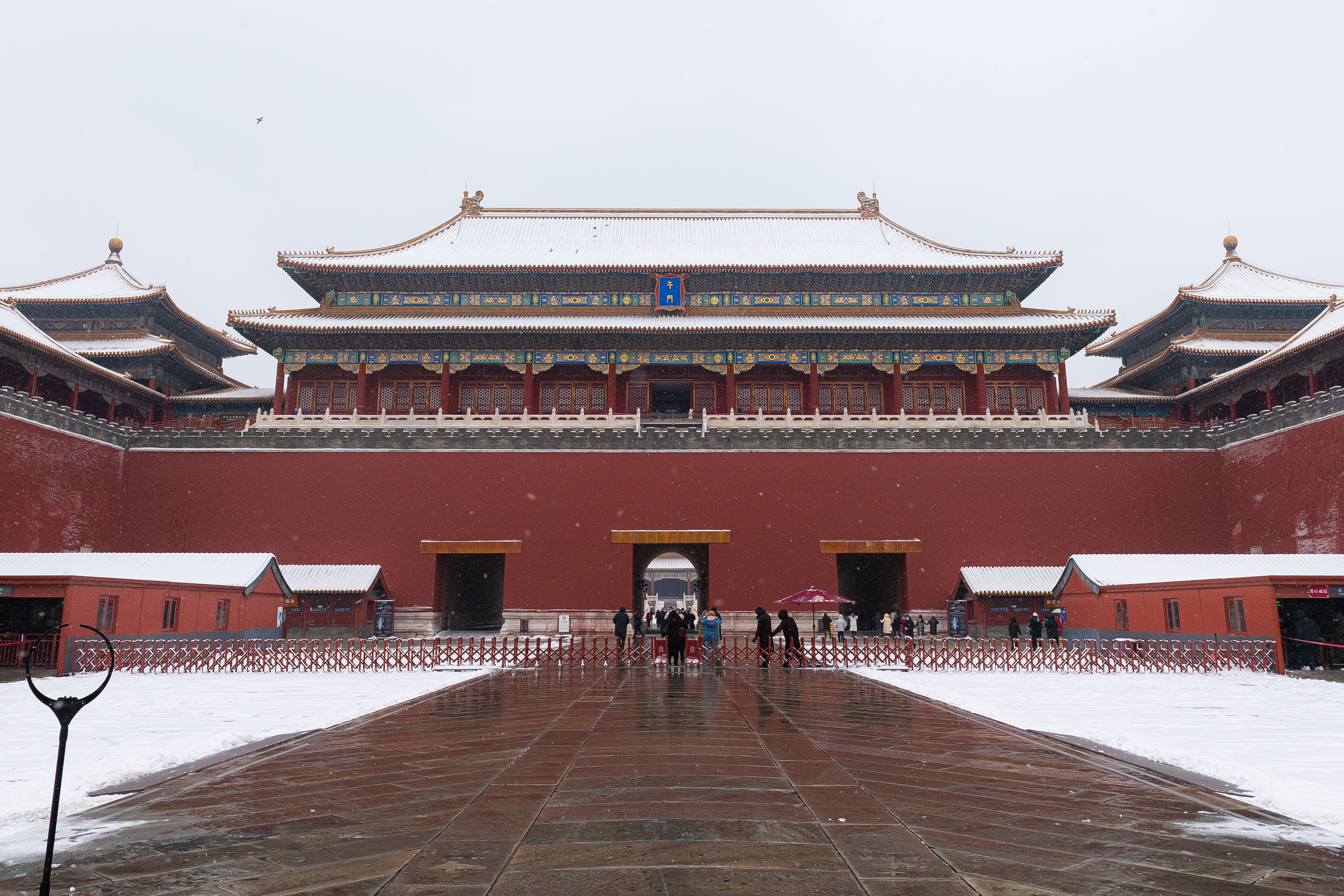
Southern-view, winter.

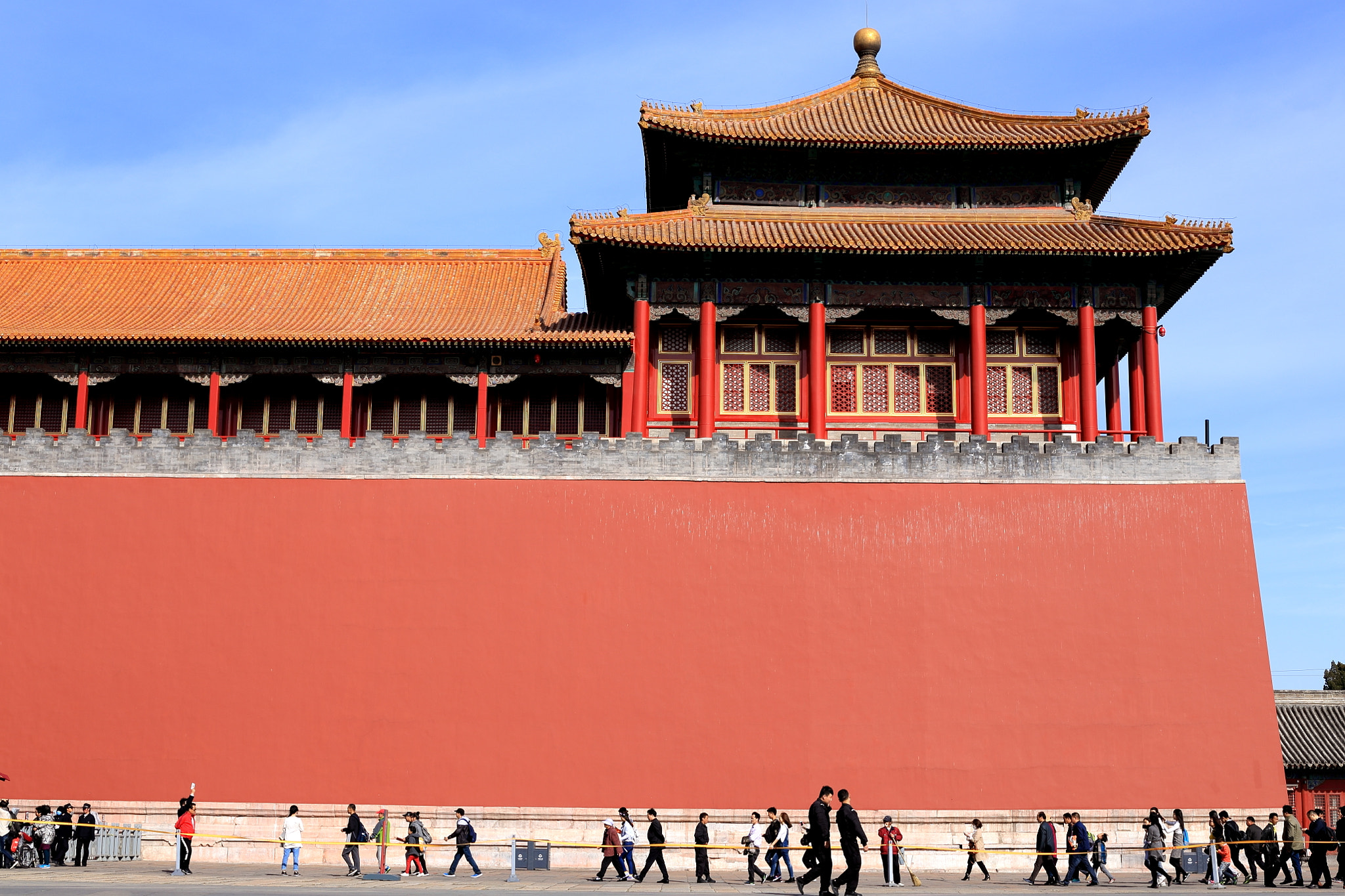
Easternmost superstructure detail.

== See also ==
- Ming Palace, in Nanjing, which had a southern gate also called "Meridian Gate".
- Meridian Gate (Huế)
