= Gate of China, Beijing =

Former southern gateway to Beijing

Coordinates: 39°54′04″N 116°23′30″E

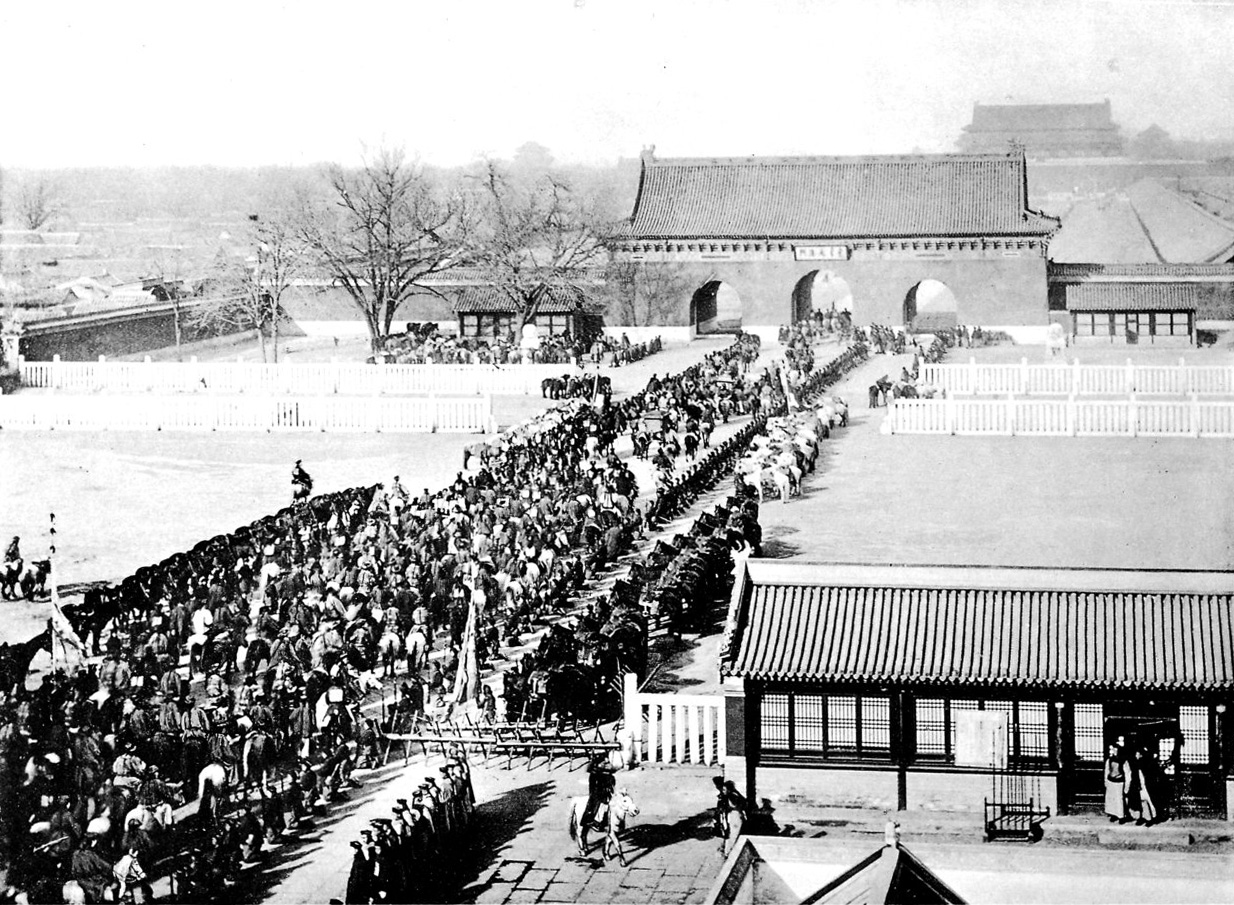
An imperial procession entering the Imperial City through the Great Qing Gate (later renamed the Gate of China) in 1902.

The Gate of China (traditional Chinese: 中華門; simplified Chinese: 中华门; pinyin: Zhōnghuámén) was a historical ceremonial gateway in Beijing, China, located near the center of latter-day Tiananmen Square. It was demolished in 1954. This gate formed the southern gate of the Imperial City during the Ming and Qing dynasties. It was situated on the central axis of Beijing, to the north of Zhengyang Gate, and south of Tiananmen. Unlike these two defensive gates, the Gate of China was a purely ceremonial gateway, with no ramparts, but was a brick-stone structure with three gateways.

== History ==
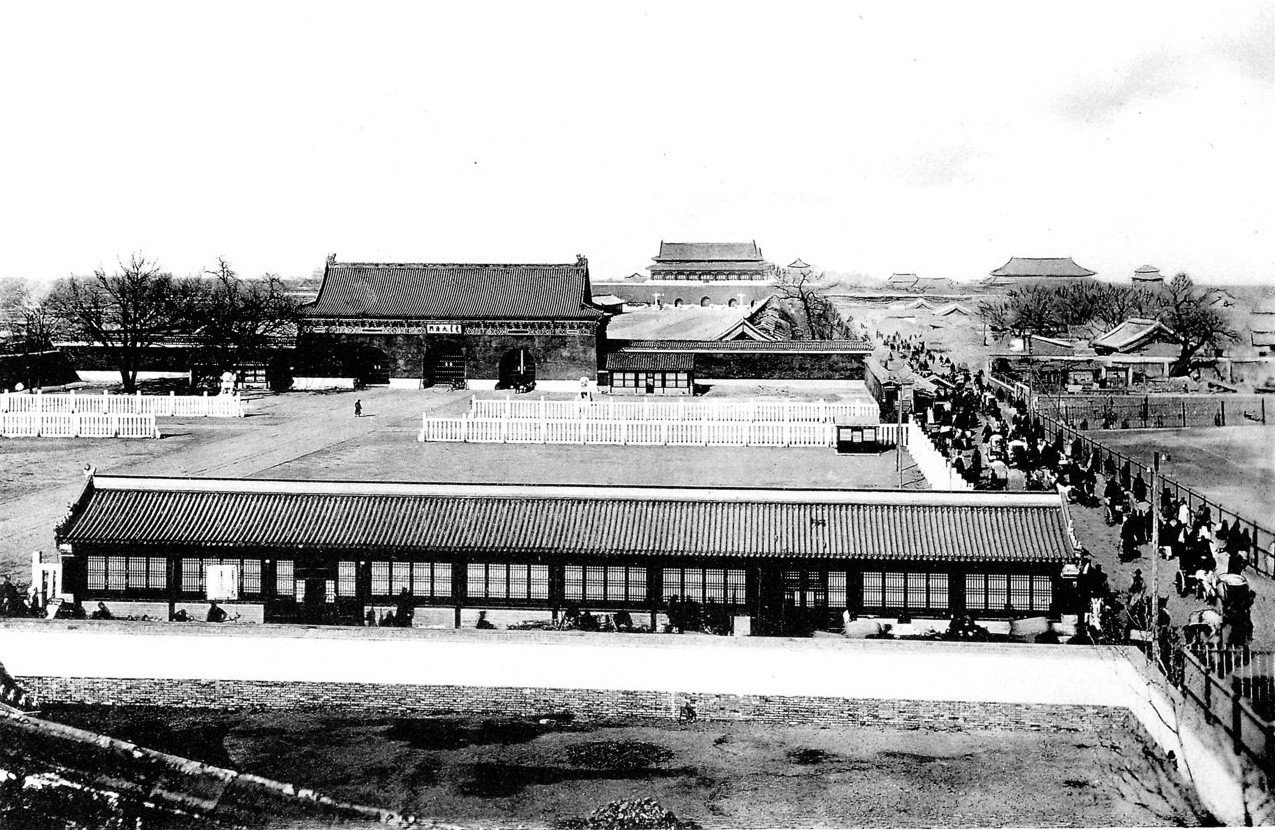
The gate viewed from Zhengyang Men. Visible behind the gate (to the north) are Tiananmen Gate and the Forbidden City.

The gate was first built in the Yongle period of the Ming dynasty. As it was the southern gate of the Imperial City, and in ancient China "south" was regarded as the most eminent direction, this gate enjoyed a status as "Gate of the Nation". The gate held great symbolic importance, as its name changed alongside the current ruling dynasty. In the Ming dynasty it was known as the "Great Ming Gate", and bore a set of engraved couplets "The Sun and Moon illuminate the virtues of Heaven; The Mountains and Rivers make magnificent the home of the Emperor." (「日月光天德，山河壯帝居。」). When the Qing dynasty replaced the Ming, the gate's name was accordingly changed to the "Great Qing Gate" (Chinese: Dàqīngmén, 大清門; Manchu: Daicing dukaᡩᠠᡳ᠌ᠴᡳᠩ
ᡩᡠᡴᠠ) in 1644. After the fall of the Qing dynasty in 1912, the gate's name was changed to the "Gate of China". In 1952, with the expansion of Tiananmen Square, consultants from the Soviet Union recommended demolishing the gate. In 1954, the gate was demolished. In 1976, after the death of Mao Zedong, a mausoleum was built for him on the site of the former gate.

== Architecture ==
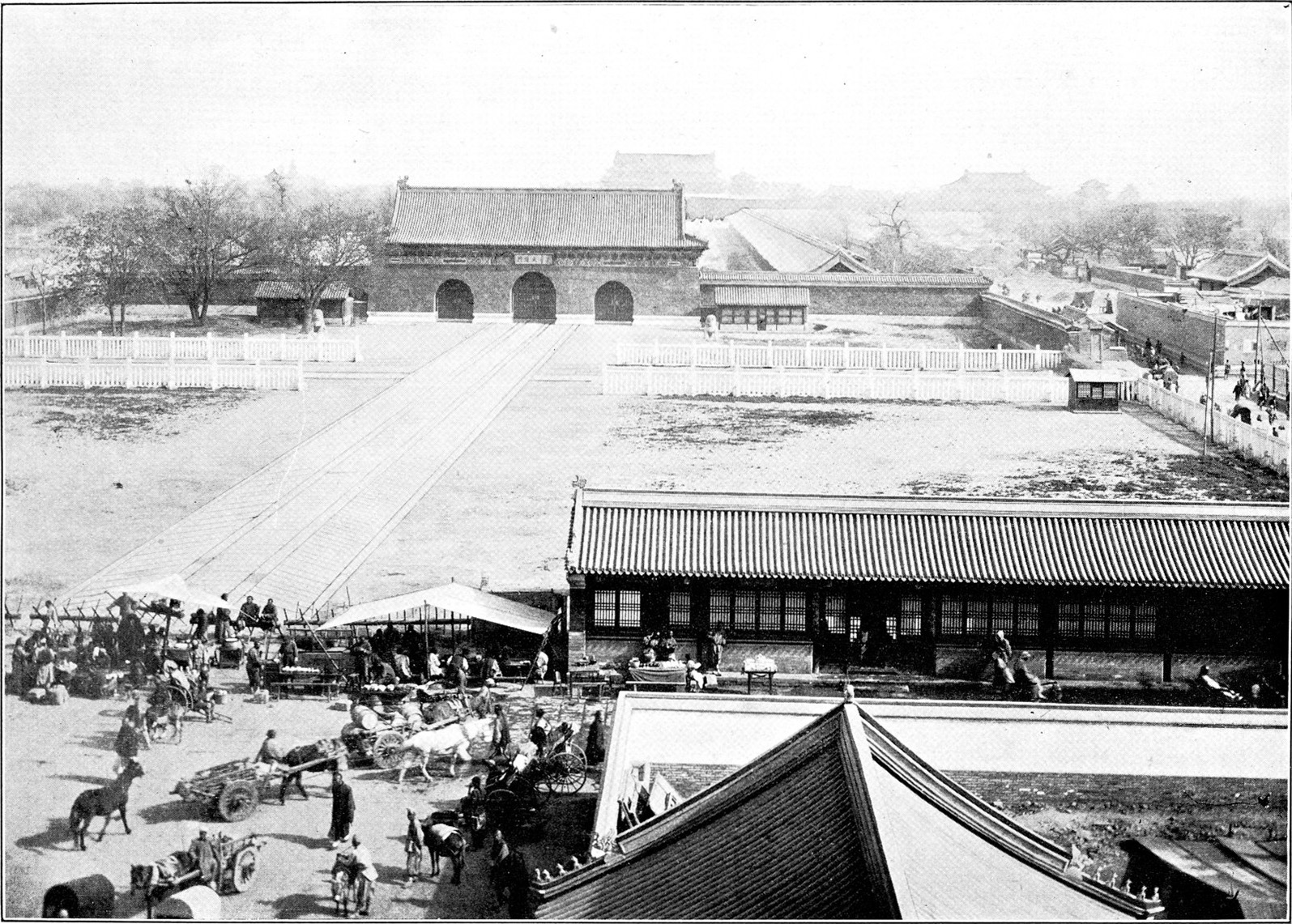
The gate of China in the 1900s, viewed from Zhengyangmen Gate (Qianmen Gate), with Tiananmen Gate and the Forbidden City in the background.

As the dividing point between the Imperial City and the commoners' city, the Gate of China was constructed to be formal and stately. The Great Qing Code prescribed that it was to have three gateways, flying eaves, a perfectly square plaza before it, two lions on each side, and a "dismounting stele" on each side (「大清門，三闕上爲飛簷崇脊，門前地正方，繞以石欄，左右獅各一，下馬石碑各一。」). It is similar in style to the Great Red Gate at the Ming Dynasty Tombs and imperial tombs of the Qing dynasty.

In the Qing dynasty, the space between the Great Qing Gate and the Zhengyang Men was a square plaza surrounded by a stone fence. During the Ming dynasty, this space had been a busy market place, called "Chessgrid Streets" because of the narrow alleys between stalls.

The Dismounting Steles outside the gate marked the place where officials must exit from their sedan chairs or dismount from horses.

Only the Emperor, Empress, and Empress Dowager were allowed to ride in sedan chairs through the gate. In the Qing dynasty, the Empress may only enter the Forbidden City via the Great Qing Gate on the occasion of her wedding. All other concubines and consorts had to enter via the north gate, the Gate of Divine Might.

== Tablet ==
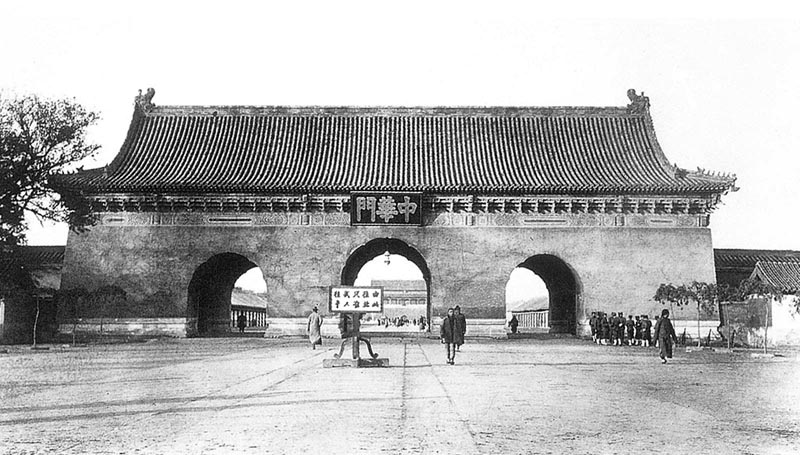
The Gate of China in the Republican era, when the tablet read "Zhonghuamen", written from right to left.

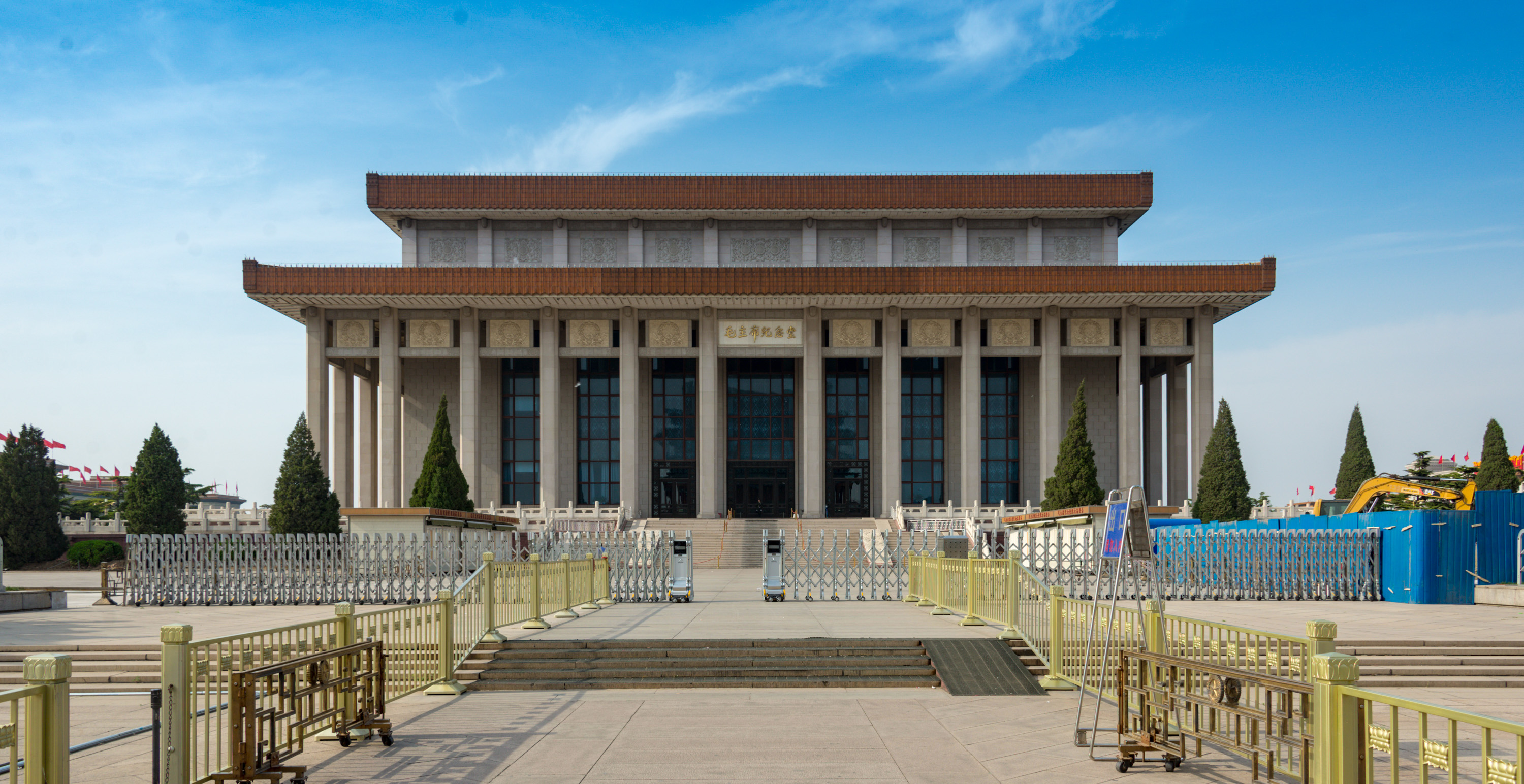
The Mausoleum of Mao Zedong built on the site of the Gate of China

The main tablet hanging above the gate was carved out of stone, with the individual characters made of Lapis lazuli and fitted into the tablet. On October 9, 1912, the day before the one year anniversary of the Xinhai Revolution, the Republic of China government decided to change the name to "China Gate" to celebrate the overthrow of imperial power. It was thought that they could simply take down the tablet, reverse it, and carve the new name on it. When the stone was taken down, however, they discovered that the inside was inscribed "Great Ming Gate": it seems the Qing artisans already thought of the idea two hundred years ago. Thus, a wooden tablet was quickly made, and the mayor of Beijing wrote the three characters 「中華門」 (Gate of China).

The original stone tablet is now in the Capital Museum in Beijing.

== See also ==
- Gates of Beijing
- Gate of China, Nanjing
- Tiananmen Square
