= Manchu people in Taiwan =

Small ethnic minority in Taiwan

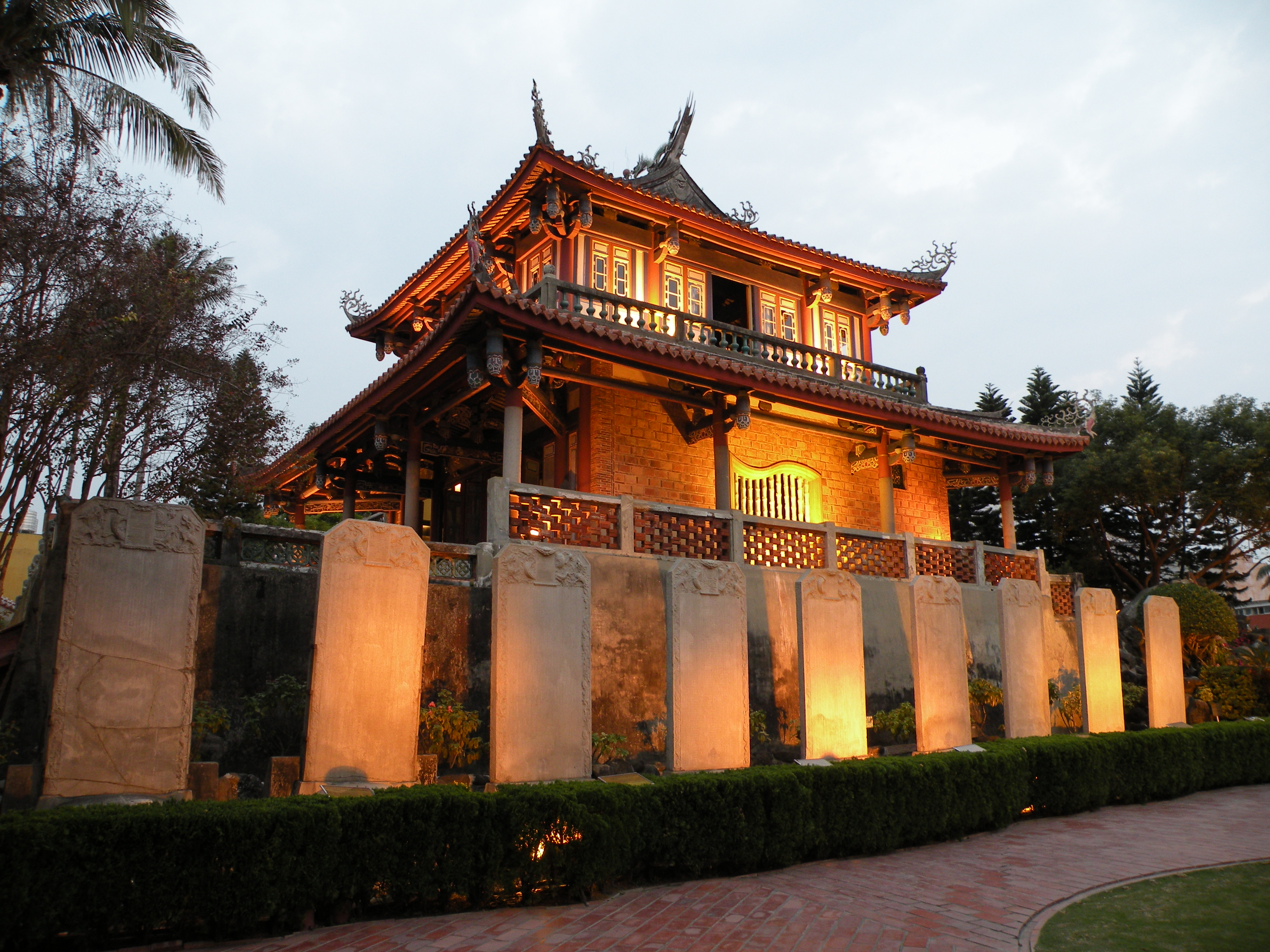
The courtyard at Fort Provintia in Tainan is lined with nine stone tortoises each carrying a 3-meter tall royal stele bestowed by the Qianlong Emperor to the general Fuk'anggan for suppressing the Lin Shuangwen rebellion. Inscriptions are carved in Chinese and Manchu

The Manchu people in Taiwan constitute a small minority of the population of Taiwan.

== Migration history ==
The Manchu people living in Taiwan arrived primarily in two waves of migration. The first wave was during the Qing dynasty era, in which the Manchu-led government annexed Taiwan into the Qing Empire. The second wave was immediately following the Chinese Civil War, when the Kuomintang retreated to Taiwan. As of 2009, there are about 12,000 Manchu people living in Taiwan.

== Notable people ==
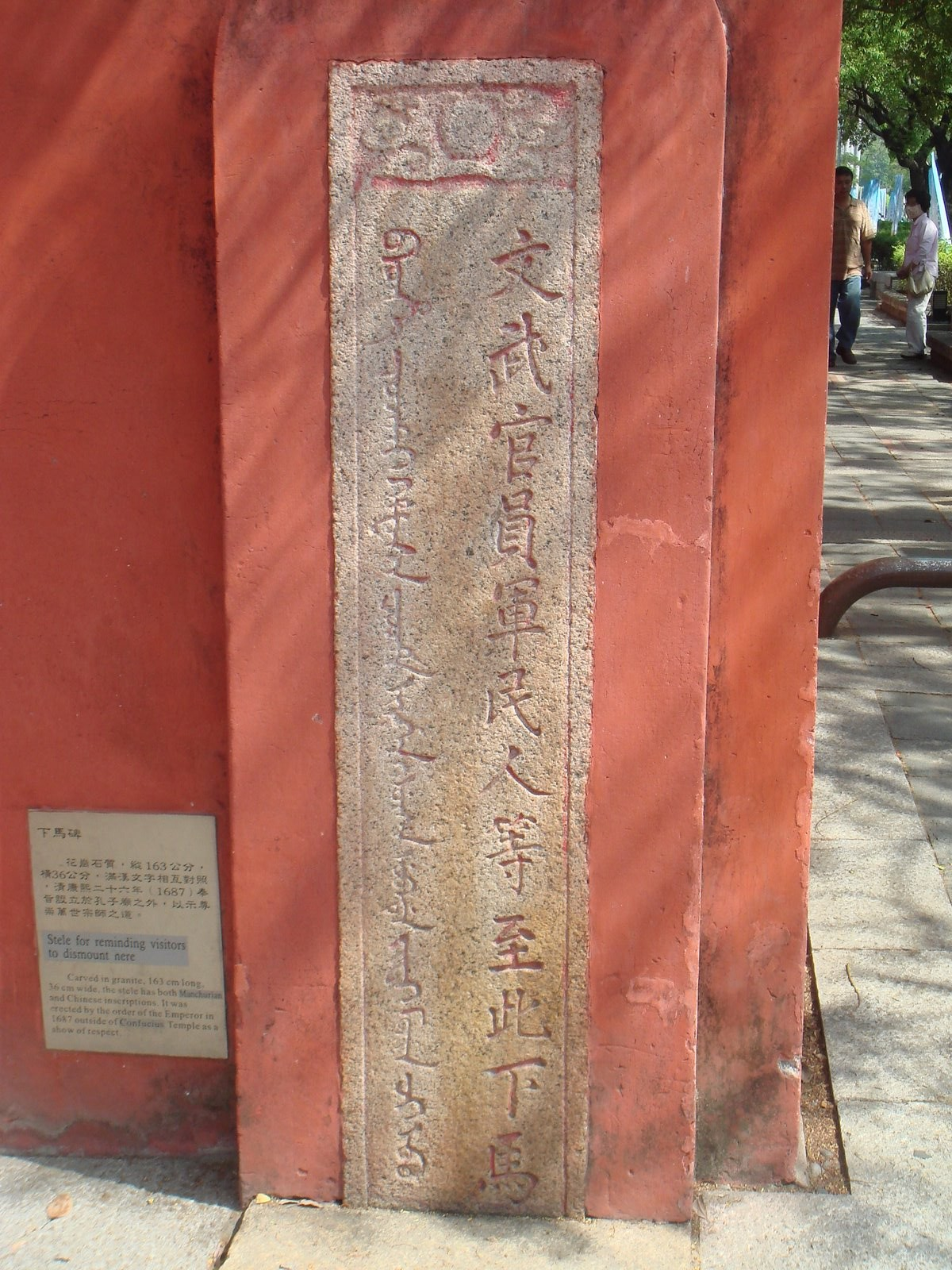
Manchu writing at the Taiwan Confucian Temple. Inscription on the dismounting stele reads: "Civil and military officials, soldiers and citizens, all dismount from their horses here"

- Puru – artist and cousin of China's last emperor Puyi. He fled to Taiwan in 1949.
- Lien Chan – former vice president and Premier (has maternal Manchu ancestry from Liaoning, mainland China).
- Sihung Lung – actor in the Taiwanese cinema who appeared in over 100 films, best known for playing paternal roles in films including Eat Drink Man Woman and The Wedding Banquet.
- Chyi Chin – Taiwanese singer and songwriter.
- Chyi Yu – Taiwanese singer and songwriter.
- King Pu-tsung – Taiwanese politician who served as Secretary-General of the Kuomintang from 2009 to 2011.
- Doze Niu – Taiwanese film director, best known for the Taiwanese film Monga.
- John Kuan – Former president of the Examination Yuan of the Republic of China from 2008 to 2014.

== See also ==
- Jiu Manzhou Dang, a set of Manchu archives stored at the National Palace Museum in Taipei, Taiwan
