= Tiananmen Square =

Public square in Beijing, China

Coordinates: 39°54′12″N 116°23′30″E

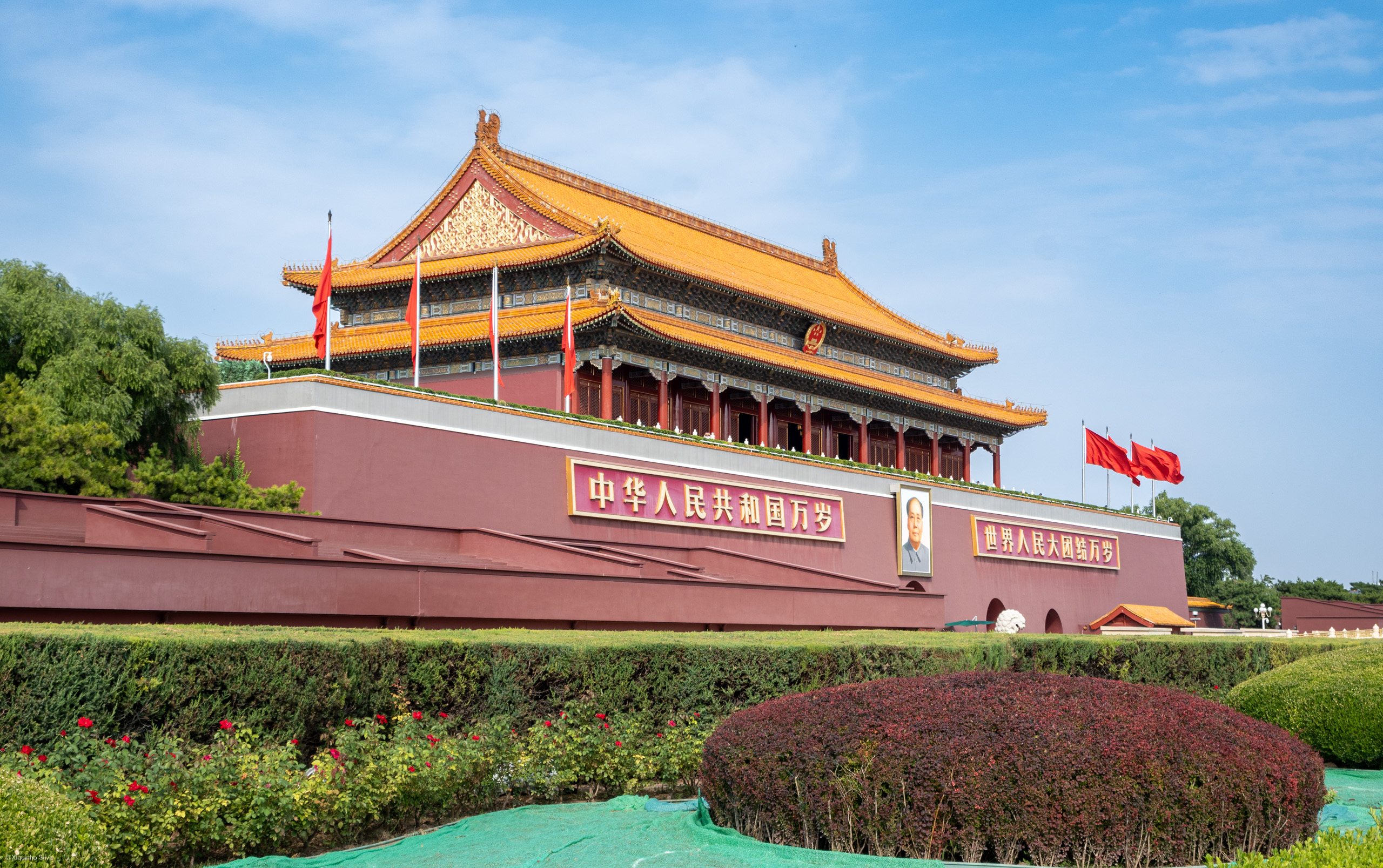
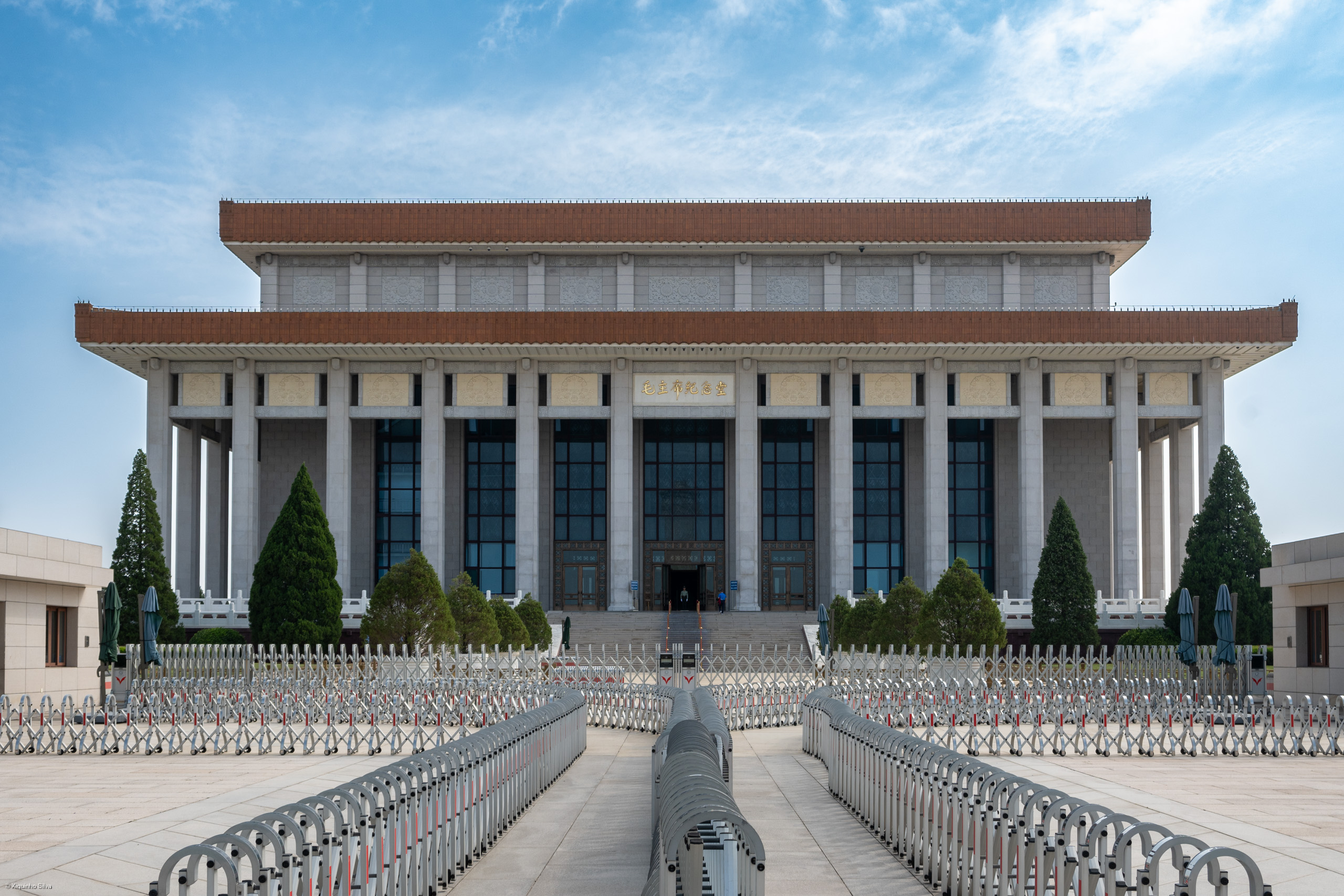
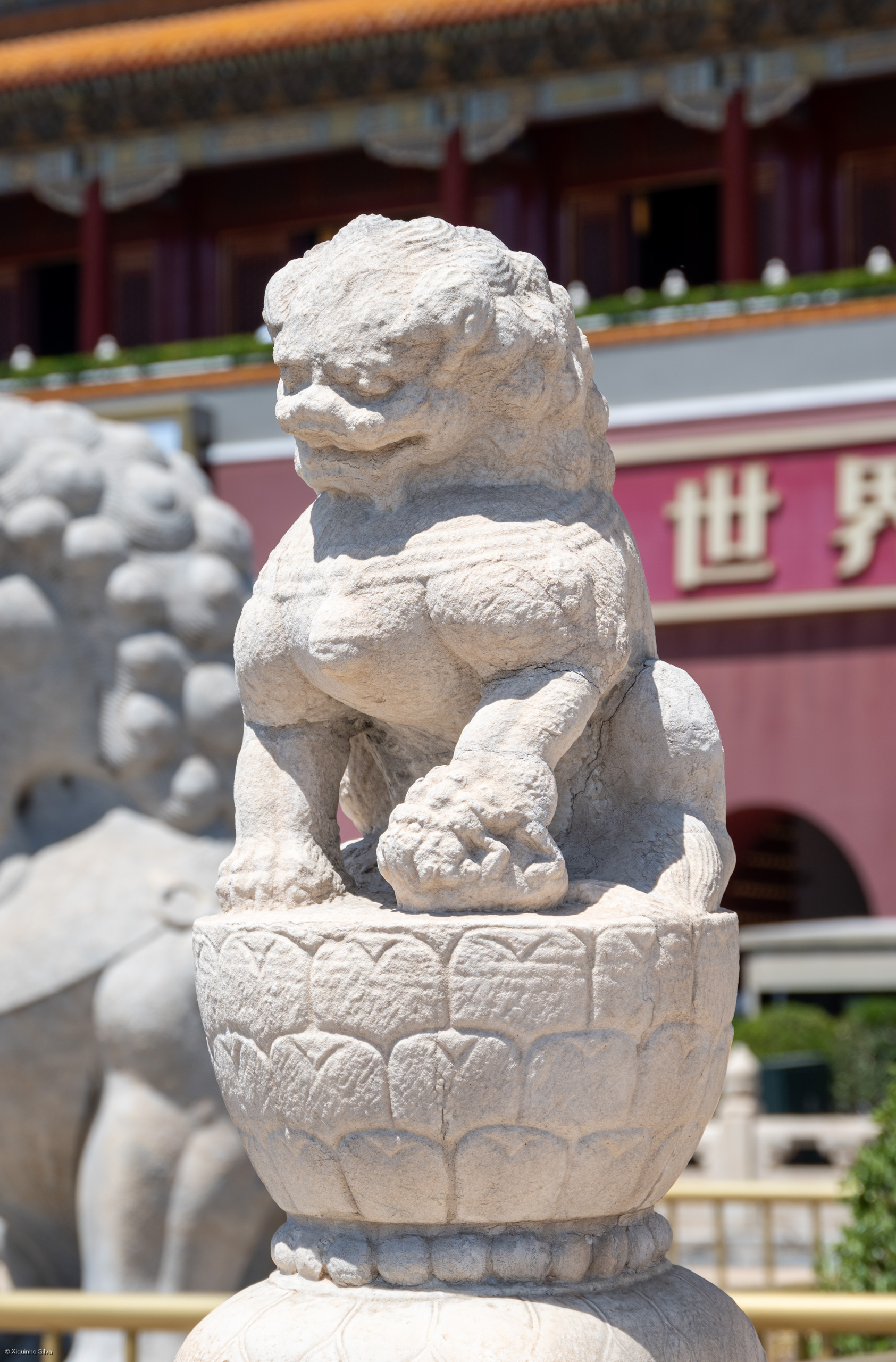
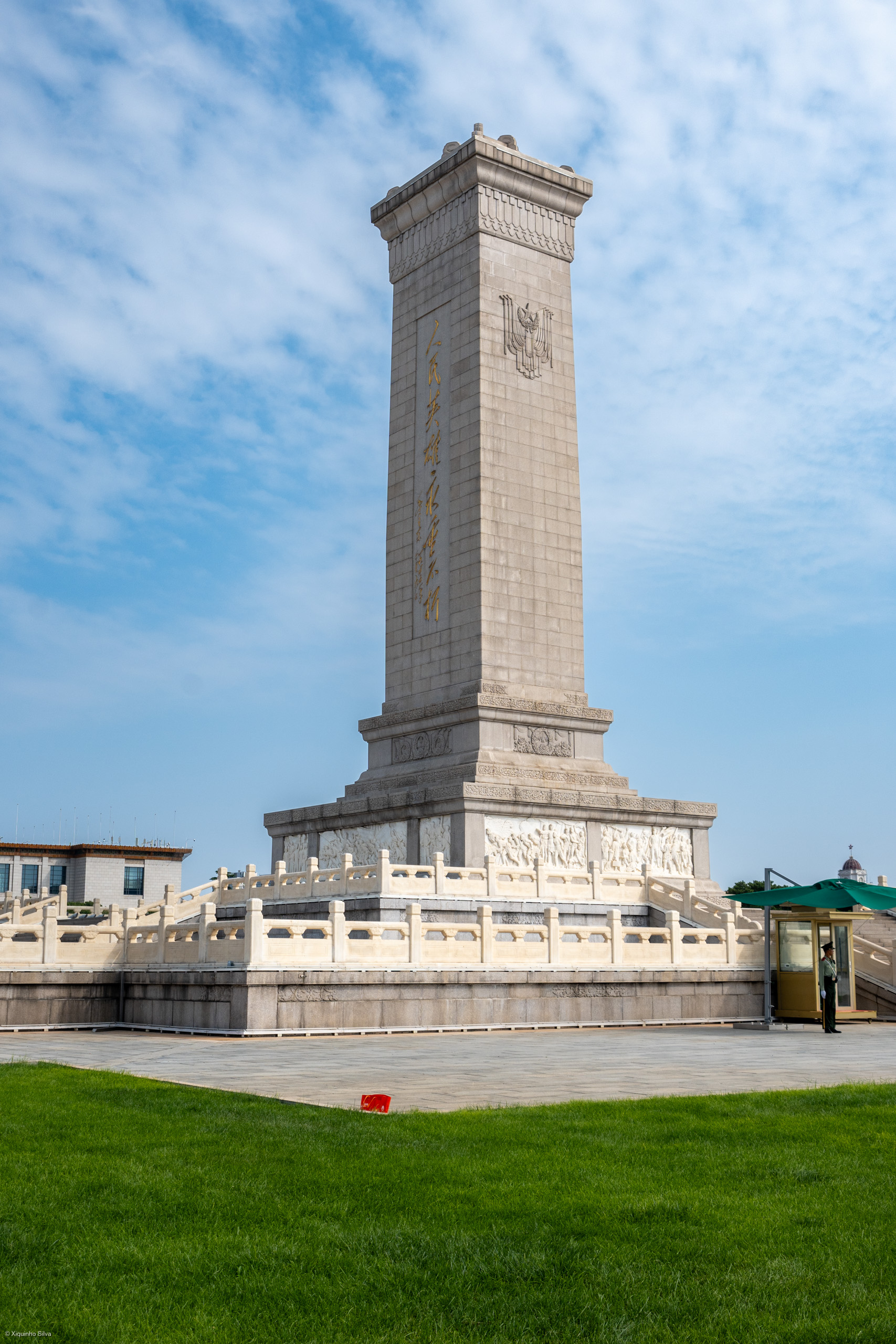
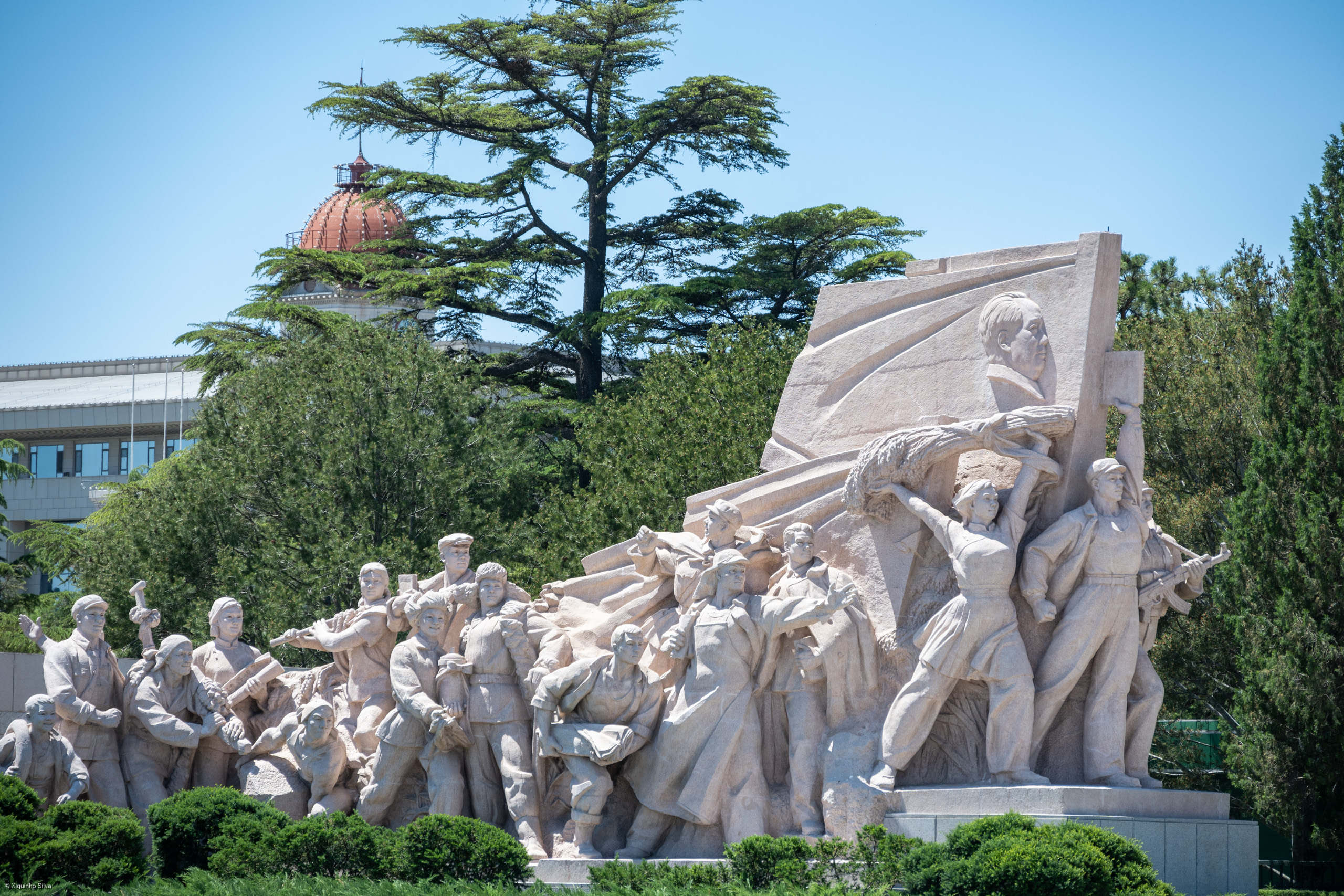
- Tiananmen Square in 2024

Chinese name
- Simplified Chinese: 天安门广场
- Traditional Chinese: 天安門廣場
- Hanyu Pinyin: Tiān'ānmén Guángchǎng
Transcriptions
Standard Mandarin
- Hanyu Pinyin: Tiān'ānmén Guángchǎng
- Bopomofo: ㄊㄧㄢ ㄢ ㄇㄣˊ ㄍㄨㄤˇ ㄔㄤˇ
- Gwoyeu Romatzyh: Tian'anmen Goangchaang
- Wade–Giles: Tʻien^{1}-an^{1}-mên^{2} Kuang^{3}-chʻang^{3}
- IPA: [tʰjɛ́n.án.mə̌n kwǎŋ.tʂʰàŋ]
other Mandarin
- Xiao'erjing: تْيَانْاَنْمېنْ گُوَاڭچاًڭ
Yue: Cantonese
- Yale Romanization: Tīn'ōnmùhn Gwóngchèuhng
- Jyutping: Tin^{1}on^{1}mun^{4} Gwong^{2}coeng^{4}
- IPA: [tʰíːn.ʔɔ́ːn.mȕːn kʷɔ̌ːŋ.tsʰœ̏ːŋ]
Southern Min
- Hokkien POJ: Thian-an-mn̂g Kóng-tiûⁿ

Manchu name
- Manchu script: ᡝᠯᡥᡝ ᠣᠪᡠᡵᡝ ᡩᡠᡴᠠ
- Romanization: elhe obure duka

Tiananmen Square or Tian'anmen Square (/ˈtjɛnənmən/) is a city square in the city centre of Beijing, China, named after the Tiananmen ("Gate of Heavenly Peace") located to its north, which separates it from the Forbidden City imperial palace complex. The square holds the Monument to the People's Heroes, the Great Hall of the People, the National Museum of China, and the Chairman Mao Memorial Hall. They were inscribed in the UNESCO World Heritage Sites in 2024 as a part of the Beijing Central Axis.

Tiananmen Square was designed and built in 1651 and was enlarged fourfold in the 1950s. Chairman Mao Zedong proclaimed the founding of the People's Republic of China in the square on October 1, 1949; the anniversary of this event is still observed there. The size of Tiananmen Square is 765 × 282 meters (215,730 m^{2} or 53.31 acres). A national flagpole is located at the northern end of the square, where flag-raising and flag-lowering ceremonies are held daily at sunrise and sunset.

The square has great cultural significance as it was the site of several important events in Chinese history, including the May Fourth Movement in 1919, the March 18 Massacre in 1926, and the 1976 Tiananmen incident. Outside China, the square is best known for the 1989 Tiananmen Square protests and massacre. Within China, the government undertakes strict censorship regarding the 1989 protests and subsequent massacre.

== History ==
=== Early history ===
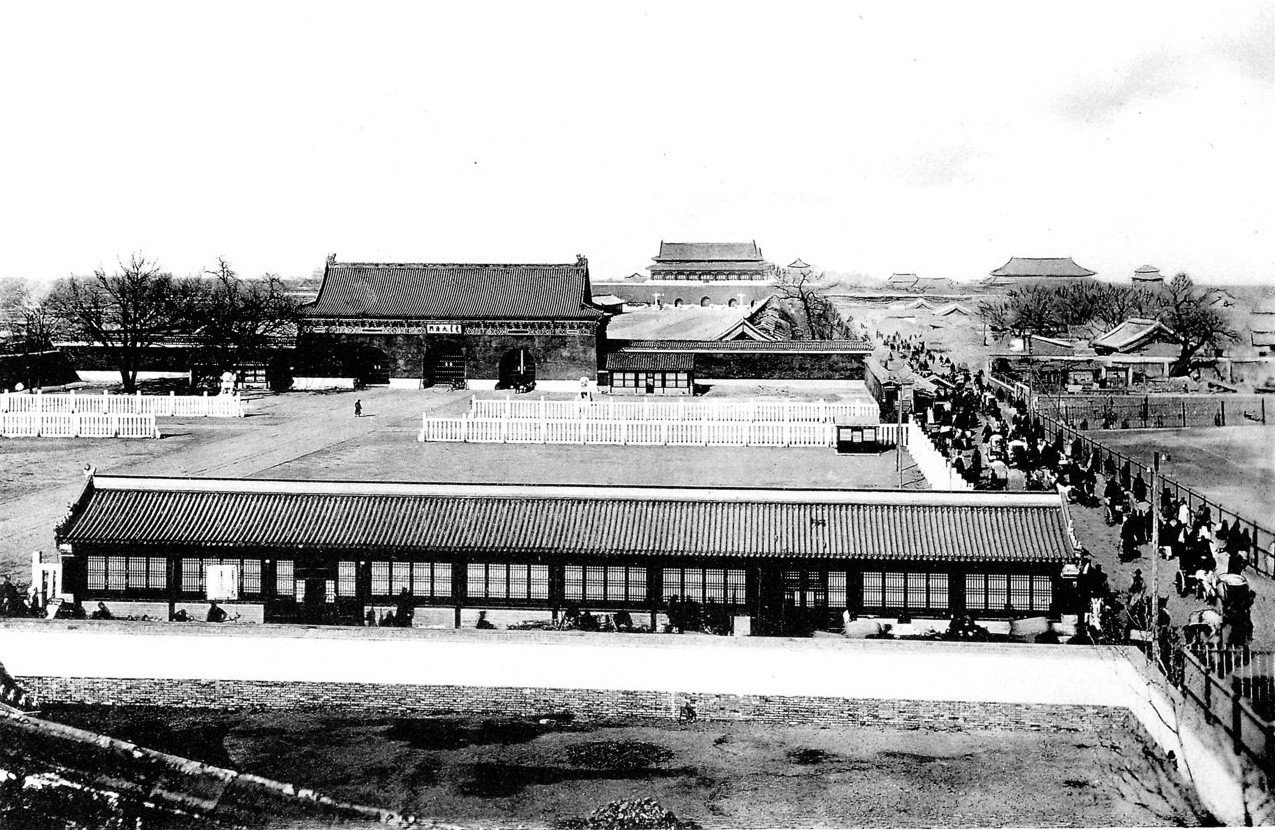
Tiananmen Square during the Qing Dynasty, viewed from the Zhengyangmen Gate with the Gate of China, later removed in 1954 to make room for the present-day Mao Zedong Mausoleum. The "corridor of a thousand steps" is visible in the picture.

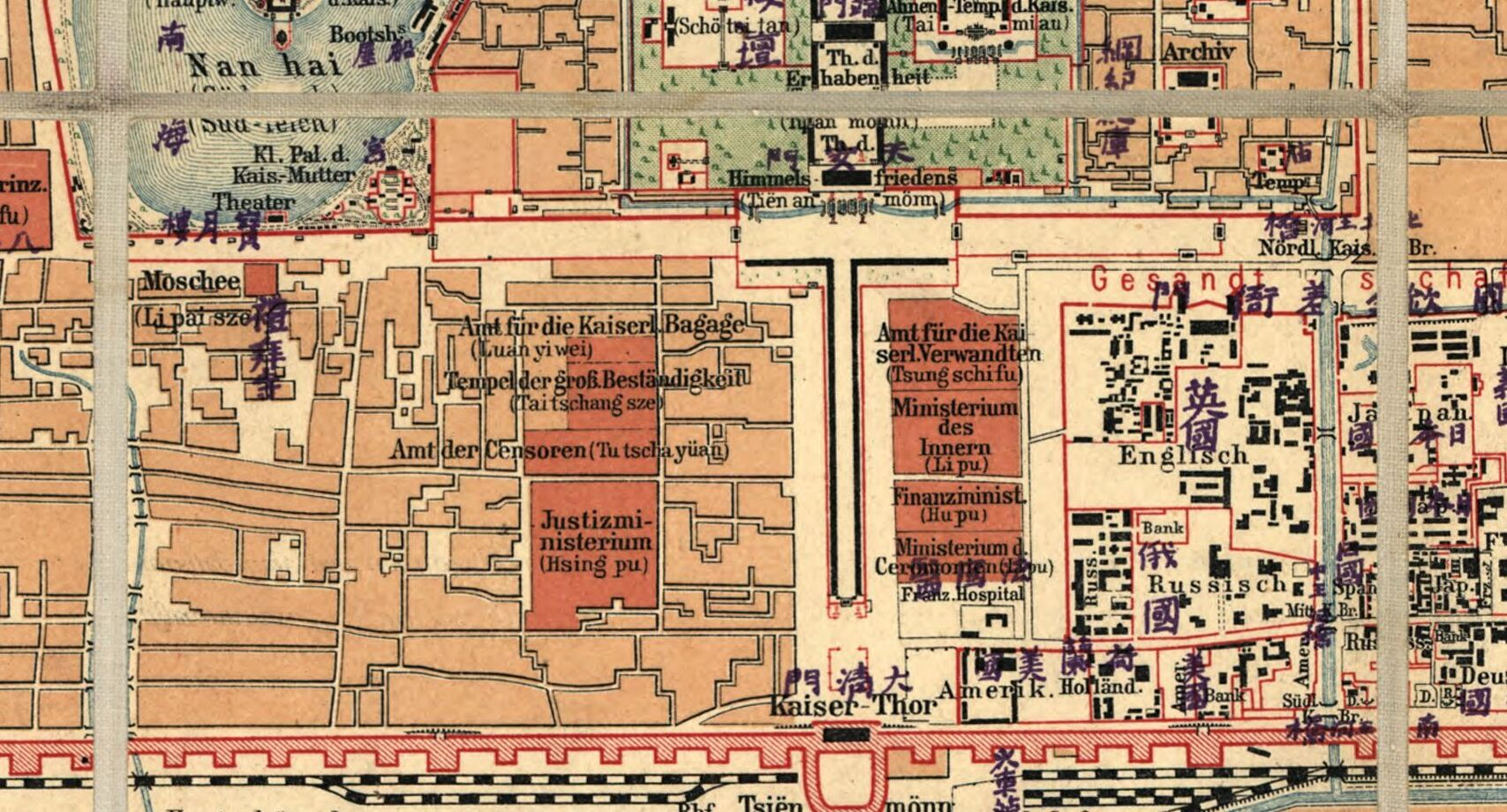
Before the 1910s, today's Tiananmen Square (here labelled as Tiën-an-möm) was not a square but a corridor, surrounded by various gates and office buildings, which were gradually torn down from 1912 to 1959. In this map the Legation Quarter can be seen in its right.

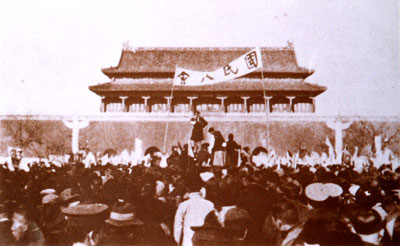
Tiananmen Square during the May Fourth movement in 1919

(video) Two shots of the namesake gate to the north followed by a shot of inside Tiananmen Square in 2017

The Tiananmen ("Gate of Heavenly Peace"), a gate in the wall of the Imperial City, was built in 1417 during the Ming dynasty. During the 17th century, fighting between Li Zicheng's rebel forces and the forces of the Manchu-led Qing dynasty caused heavy damage to, or even destroyed, the gate. Tiananmen Square was designed and built in 1651 and was enlarged fourfold in the 1950s.

The gate historically known as the "Great Ming Gate", the southern gate to the Imperial City stands near the center of the square. It was renamed the "Great Qing Gate" during the Qing dynasty, and the "Gate of China" during the Republican era. Unlike the other gates in Beijing, such as the Tiananmen and the Zhengyang Gate, this was a purely ceremonial gateway, with three arches but no ramparts, similar in style to the ceremonial gateways found in the Ming tombs. This gate had a special status as the "Gate of the Nation", as can be seen from its successive names. It normally remained closed, except when the emperor passed through. Commoner traffic was diverted to side gates at the western and eastern ends of the square, respectively. Because of this diversion in traffic, a busy marketplace, called "Chess Grid Streets", was developed in the large fenced square to the south of this gate.

=== 19th century ===
In 1860, during the Second Opium War, when British and French troops occupied Beijing, they pitched camp near the gate and briefly considered burning down the gate and the Forbidden City. Ultimately, they decided to spare the Forbidden City and instead burn down the Old Summer Palace. The Xianfeng Emperor eventually agreed to let Western powers barrack troops – and later establish diplomatic missions – in the area, hence there was the Legation Quarter immediately to the east of the square. When the forces of the Eight-Nation Alliance besieged Beijing during the Boxer Rebellion in 1900, they badly damaged the office complexes and burnt down several ministries. After the Boxer Rebellion ended, the area became a space for the Eight-Nation Alliance to assemble their military forces.

=== 20th century ===
In the 20th century, Tiananmen Square was re-developed from an insular imperial quarter to a larger public space viewed as more consistent with the political state of China at the time. During the 1950s, the square was quadrupled in size.

In 1954, the Gate of China was demolished to enlarge the square, and in November 1958, a major expansion of Tiananmen Square started, which was completed after only 11 months in August 1959. This followed the vision of Mao Zedong to make the square the largest and most spectacular in the world, as it was intended to hold over 500,000 people. During this process, a large number of residential buildings and other structures were demolished. On its southern edge, the Monument to the People's Heroes was erected. Concomitantly, as part of the Ten Great Buildings constructed between 1958 and 1959 to commemorate the ten-year anniversary of the People's Republic of China (PRC), the Great Hall of the People and the Revolutionary History Museum (now the National Museum of China) were erected on the western and eastern sides of the square.

For the first decade of the PRC, every National Day (October 1) was marked by a large military parade in Tiananmen Square, in conscious emulation of the annual Soviet celebrations of the Bolshevik Revolution. After the disastrous Great Leap Forward, the CCP decided to cut costs and have only smaller annual National Day celebrations in addition to a large celebration with a military parade every 10 years. However, the chaos of the Cultural Revolution almost prevented such an event from taking place on National Day in 1969 but did take place in 1966 and 1970.

In 1971, large portraits of Karl Marx, Friedrich Engels, Vladimir Lenin, Joseph Stalin, Sun Yat-sen, and Mao Zedong were erected in the square, painted by artist Ge Xiaoguang, who is also responsible for producing the famous portrait of Mao currently displayed over the Gate of Heavenly Peace. In 1980, with the downgrading of political ideology following Mao's death, the portraits were taken down and thenceforth only brought out on Labor Day (May 1) and National Day.

Ten years later, in 1979, the CCP again decided against a large-scale celebration, coming at a time when Deng Xiaoping was still consolidating power and China had suffered a rebuff in a border war with Vietnam earlier that year. By 1984, with the situation stabilized, the government held a military parade for the first time since 1959. The aftermath of the Tiananmen Square massacre prevented any such activities in October 1989, but military parades have been held in 1999 and 2009, on the 50th and 60th anniversaries of the PRC's founding.

One year after Mao's death, a mausoleum was built near the site of the former Gate of China along the main north–south axis of the square. In connection with this project, the square was further increased in size to become fully rectangular and able to accommodate 600,000 people.

==== 1989 protests and massacre ====
In 1989, Tiananmen Square was the site of the 1989 Tiananmen Square protests that culminated in violence and a crackdown by the People's Liberation Army. Following the crackdown, many of the student leaders escaped to the United States with the help of foreign intelligence agencies and other parties through Operation Yellowbird.

The urban context of the square was altered in the 1990s with the construction of National Grand Theater in its vicinity and the expansion of the National Museum.

== Configuration ==
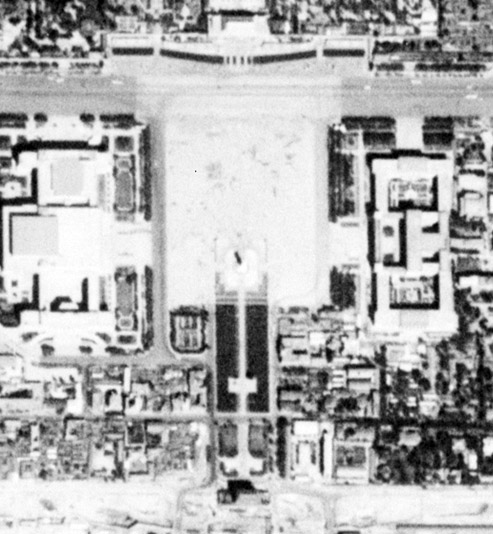
1967 satellite image of Tiananmen Square with the Tian'anmen gate to the north. Further work on the square was carried out in the 1970s to extend the open plaza by demolishing the buildings immediately to the south of the square.

Used as a venue for mass gatherings since its creation, its flatness is contrasted by both the 38-meter (125 ft)-high "Monument to the People's Heroes" and the "Mausoleum of Mao Zedong". The square lies between two ancient, massive gates: the Tiananmen to the north and the Zhengyangmen, known as Qianmen, to the south. Along the west side of the square is the Great Hall of the People. Along the east side is the National Museum of China dedicated to Chinese history predating 1919.

== Visits ==
Since Dec 15, 2021, visitors must make a reservation before entering the square area.

== Events ==
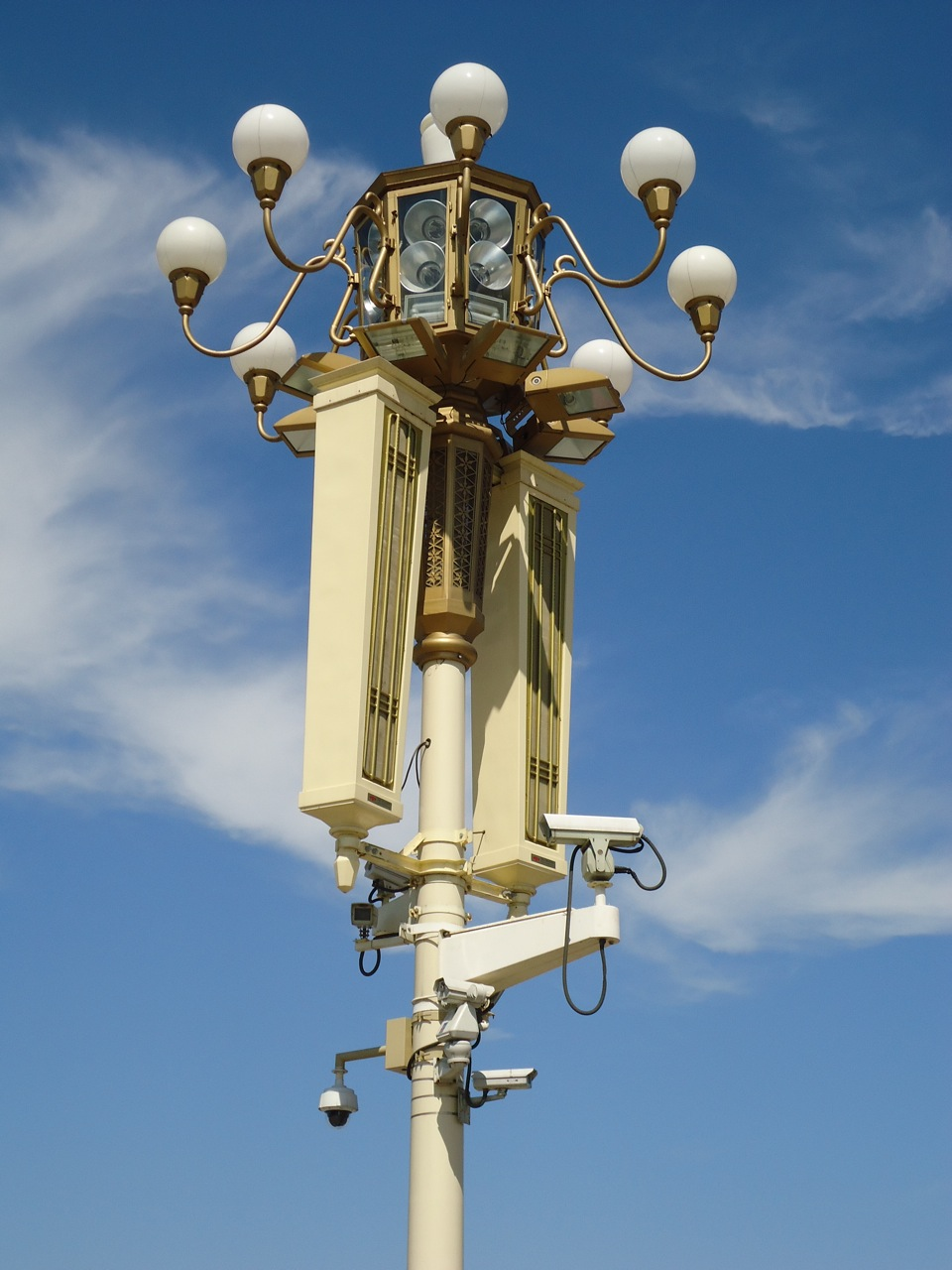
Security cameras at Tiananmen Square

Tiananmen Square has been the site of a number of notable political events, student protests, and armed conflict.

Among the most notable events that have occurred on Tiananmen Square were protests during the May Fourth Movement in 1919, the proclamation of the People's Republic of China by Mao Zedong on October 1, 1949, the Tiananmen Square protests in 1976 after the death of Zhou Enlai, and the 1989 Tiananmen Square protests and massacre after the death of Hu Yaobang, which was suppressed in a military crackdown. Shortly after the crackdown, a man, dubbed Tank Man, was photographed obstructing a column of tanks on Chang'an Avenue near the square.

Other notable events included annual mass military displays on each anniversary of the 1949 proclamation until October 1, 1959; the 1984 military parade for the 35th anniversary of the People's Republic of China which coincided with the ascendancy of Deng Xiaoping; military displays and parades on the 50th anniversary of the People's Republic of China in 1999; the Tiananmen Square self-immolation incident in 2001; military displays and parades on the 60th anniversary of the People's Republic of China in 2009, and a terror attack in 2013 involving a vehicle that plowed into pedestrians.

== Panorama ==
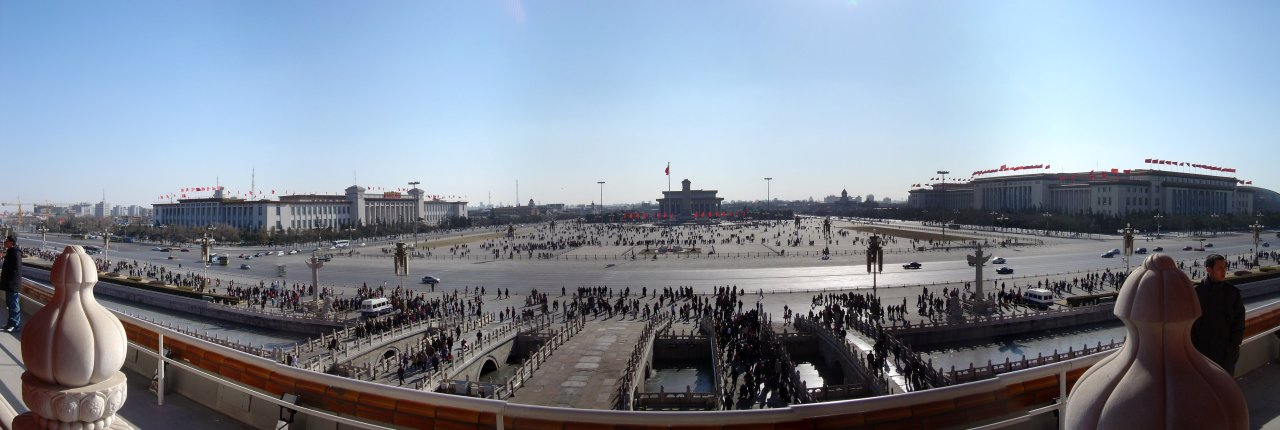
Panorama image map of Tiananmen Square from the north atop Tiananmen's gate tower, showing the square beyond Chang'an Avenue, the Monument to the People's Heroes and Chairman Mao Memorial Hall (background center), the National Museum of China (on the left), and Great Hall of the People (on the right) (mouse over for labels)

== Gallery ==
=== Architectures and Statues ===
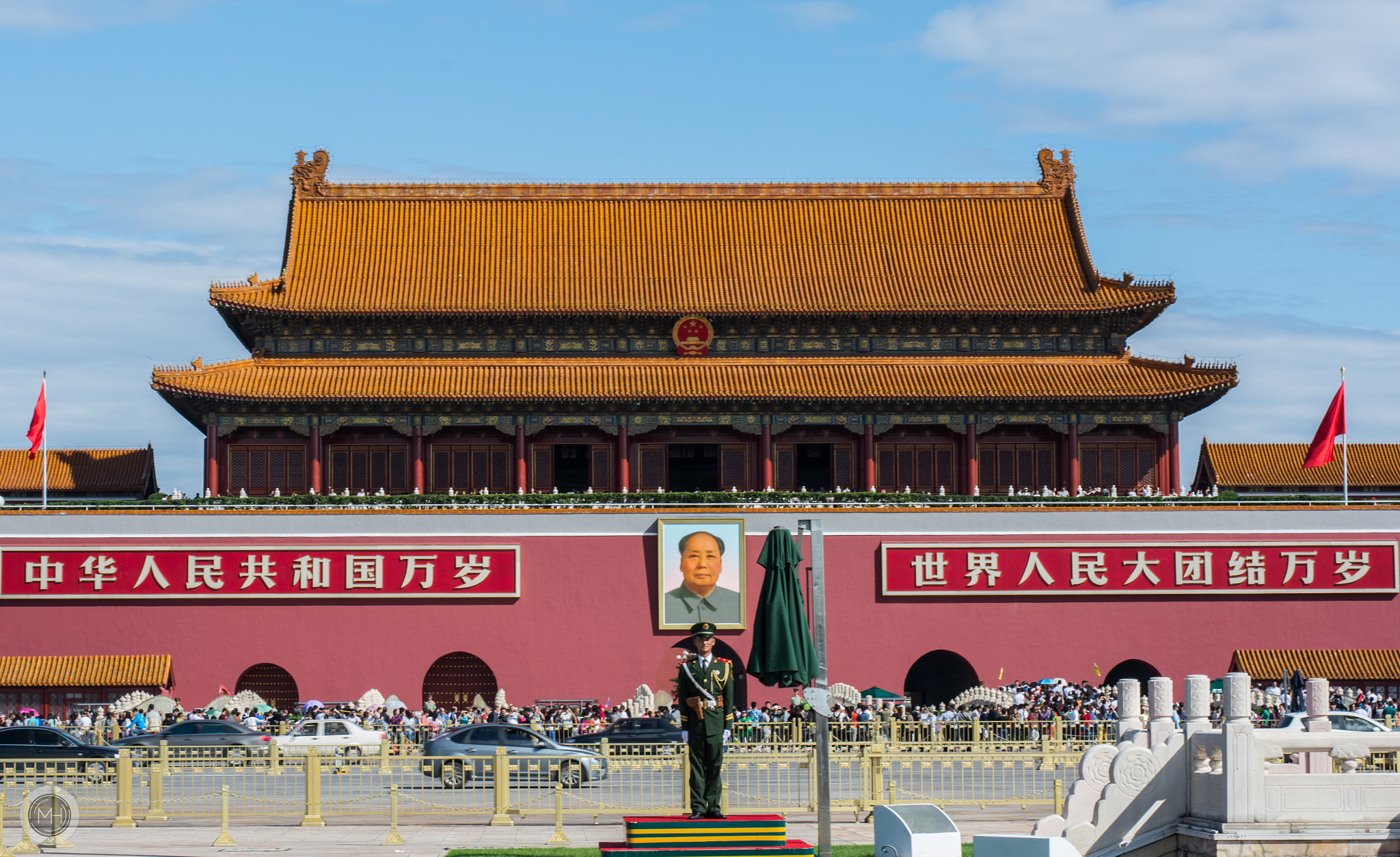
Tiananmen gate to the north of Tiananmen Square

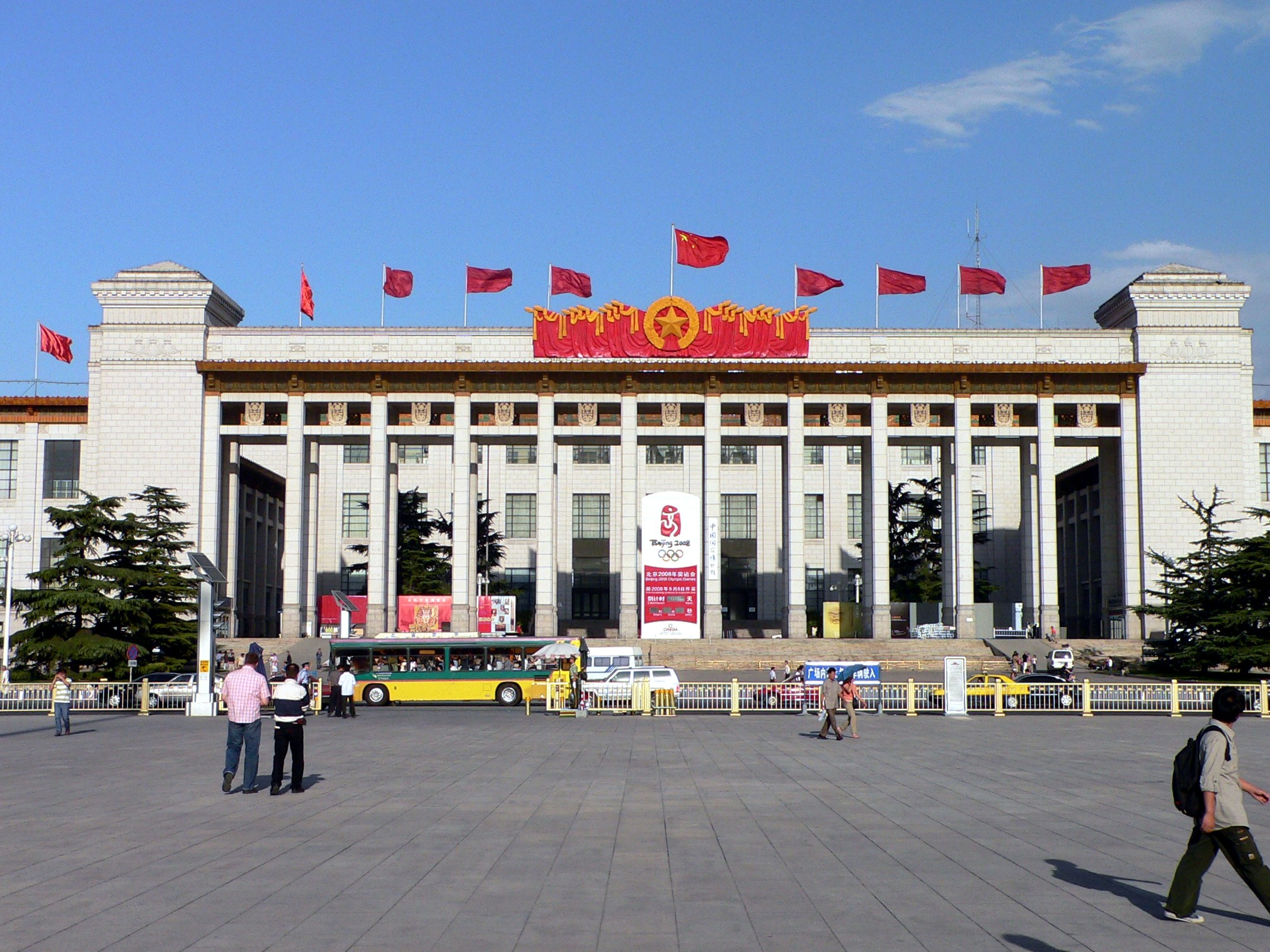
National Museum of China on the east side of the square

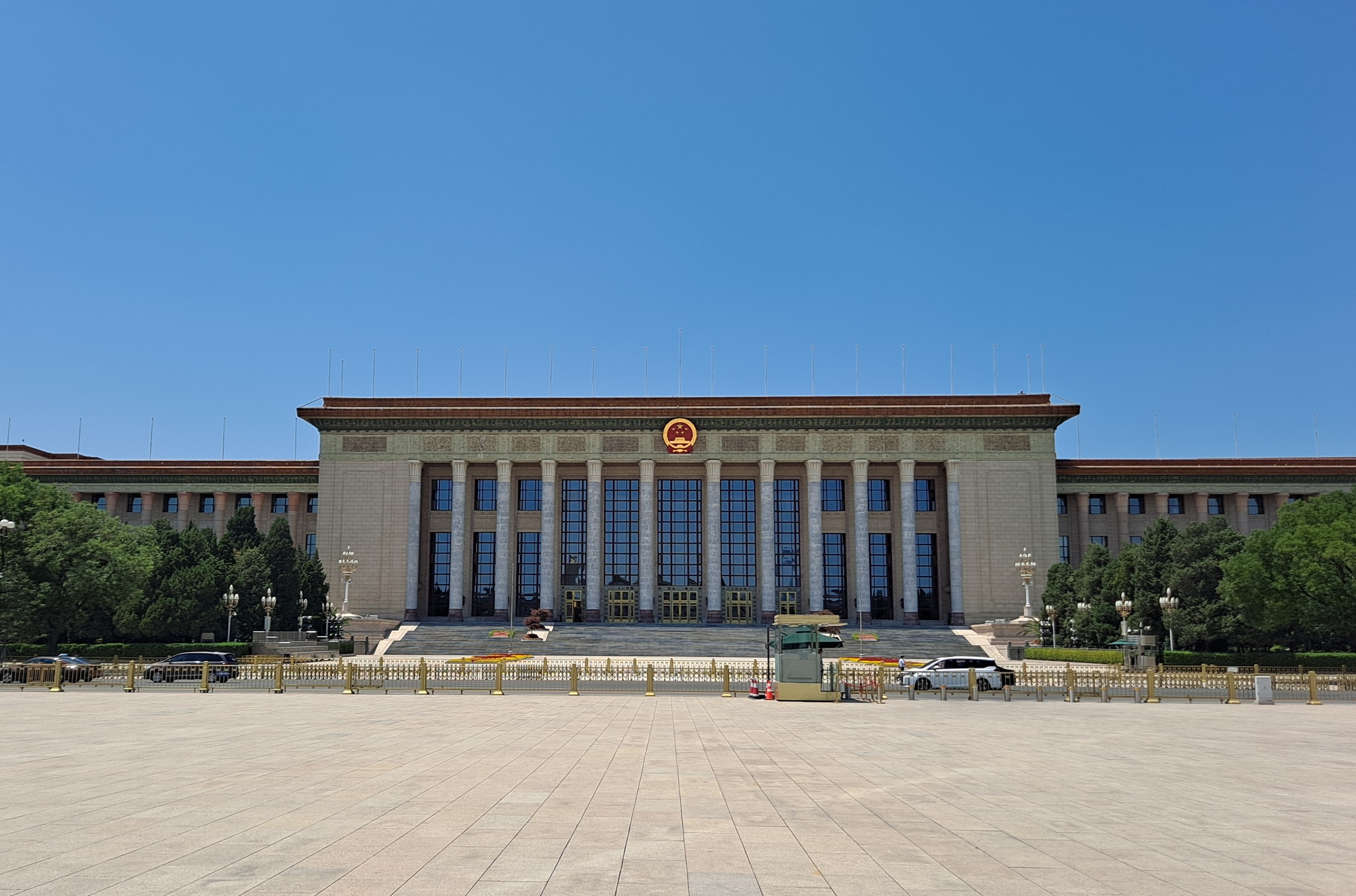
The Great Hall of the People on the west side of the square

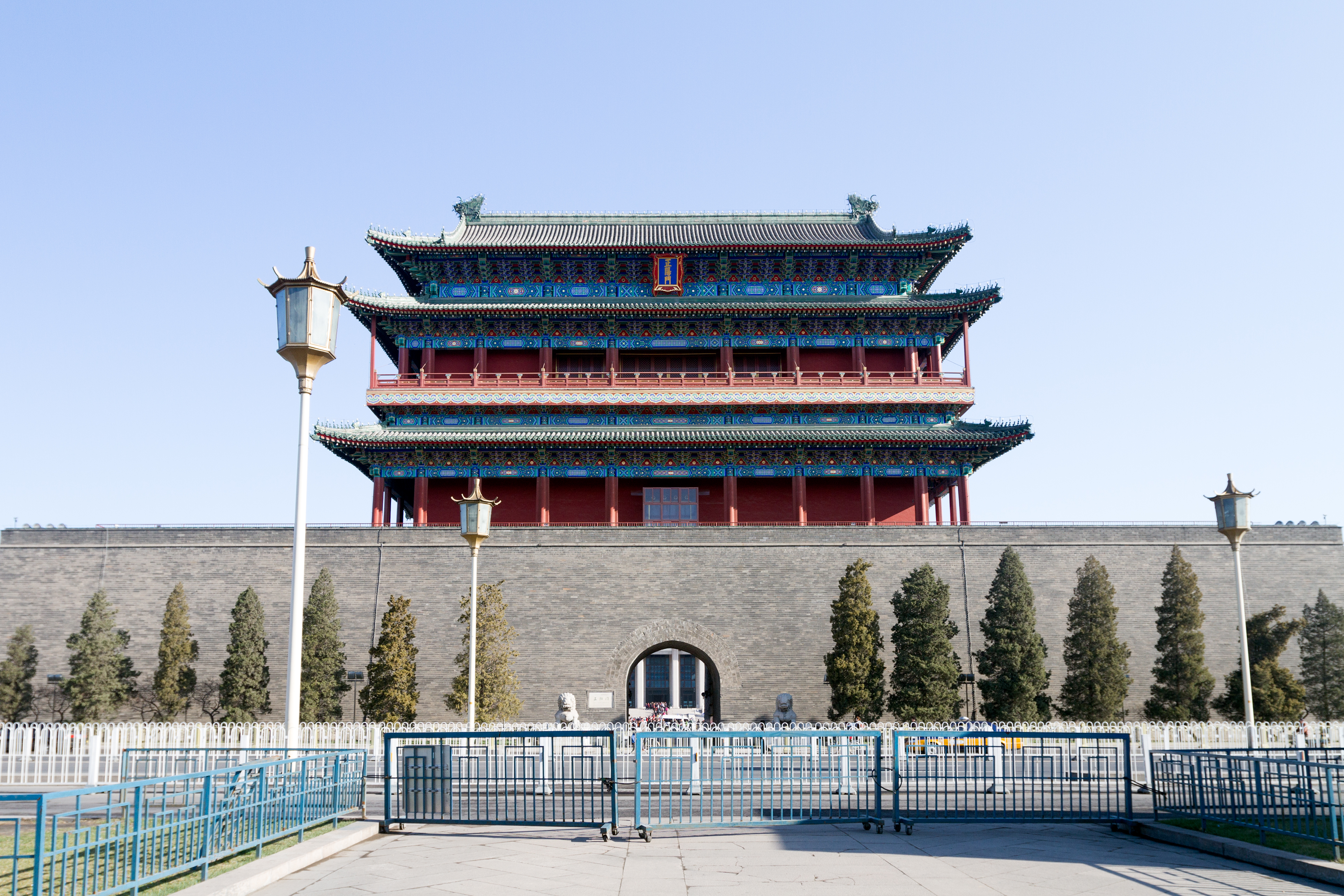
Zhengyangmen Gate Tower marking the south end of Tiananmen Square

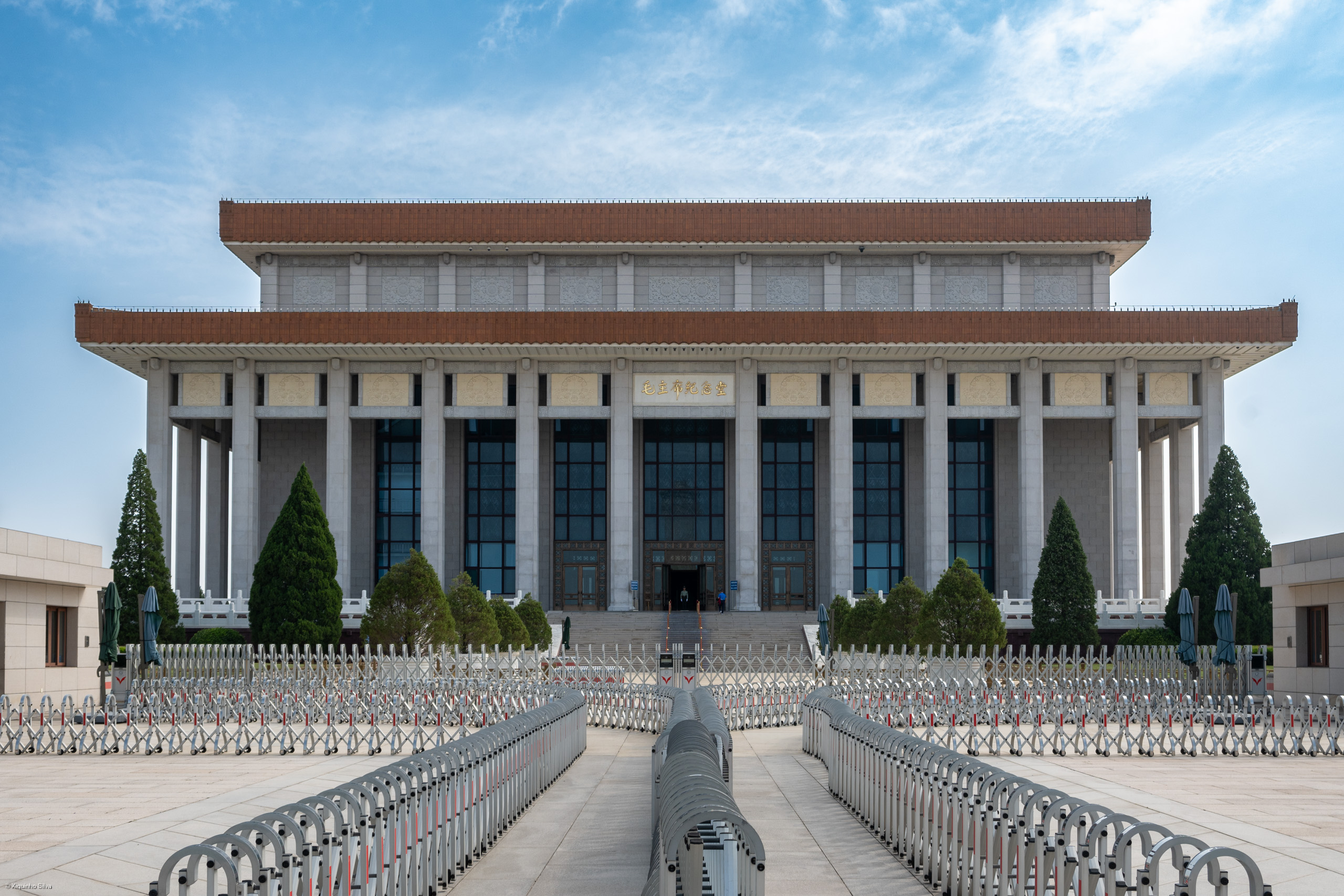
Mausoleum of Mao Zedong

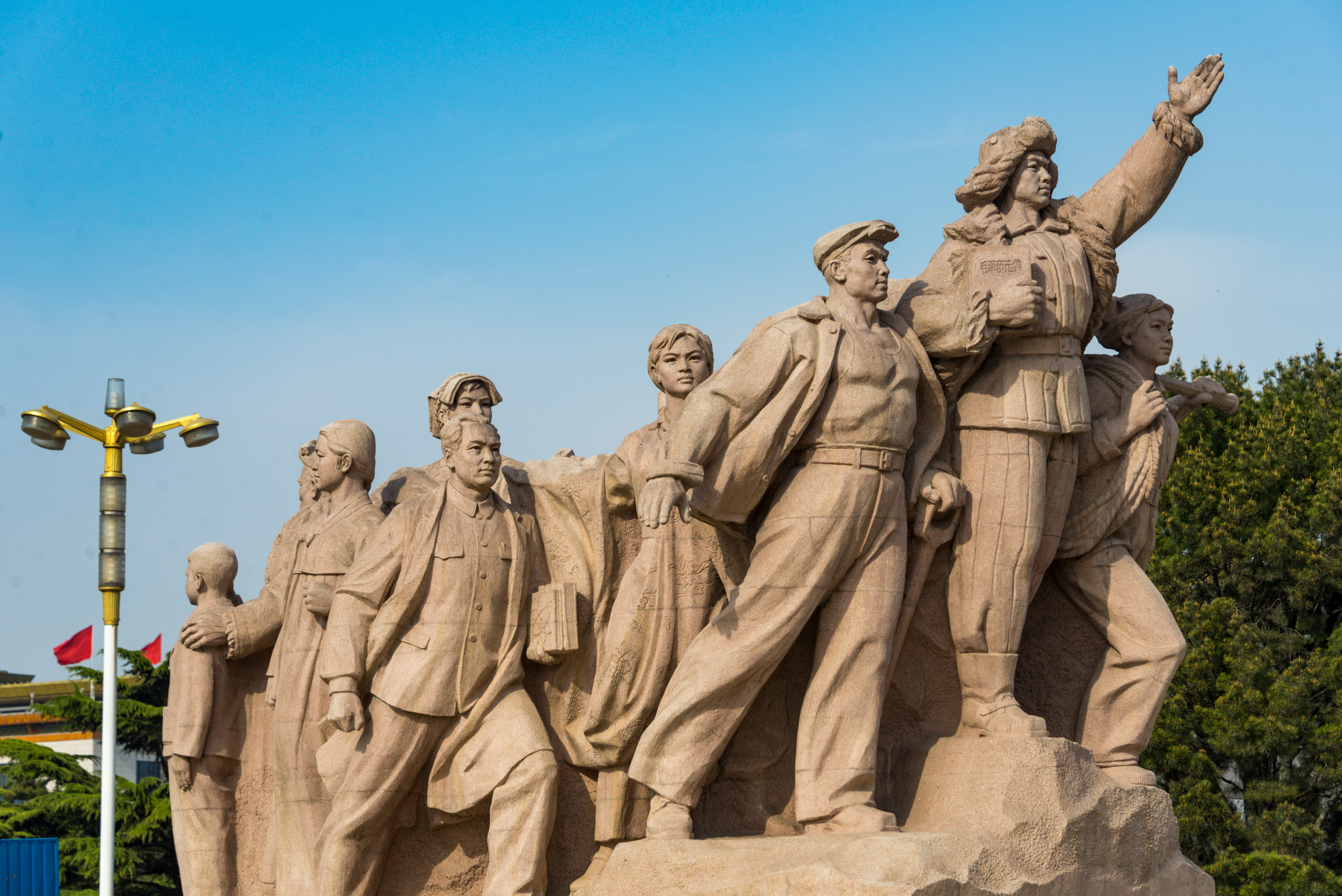
Monument in front of Mao's Mausoleum on Tiananmen Square

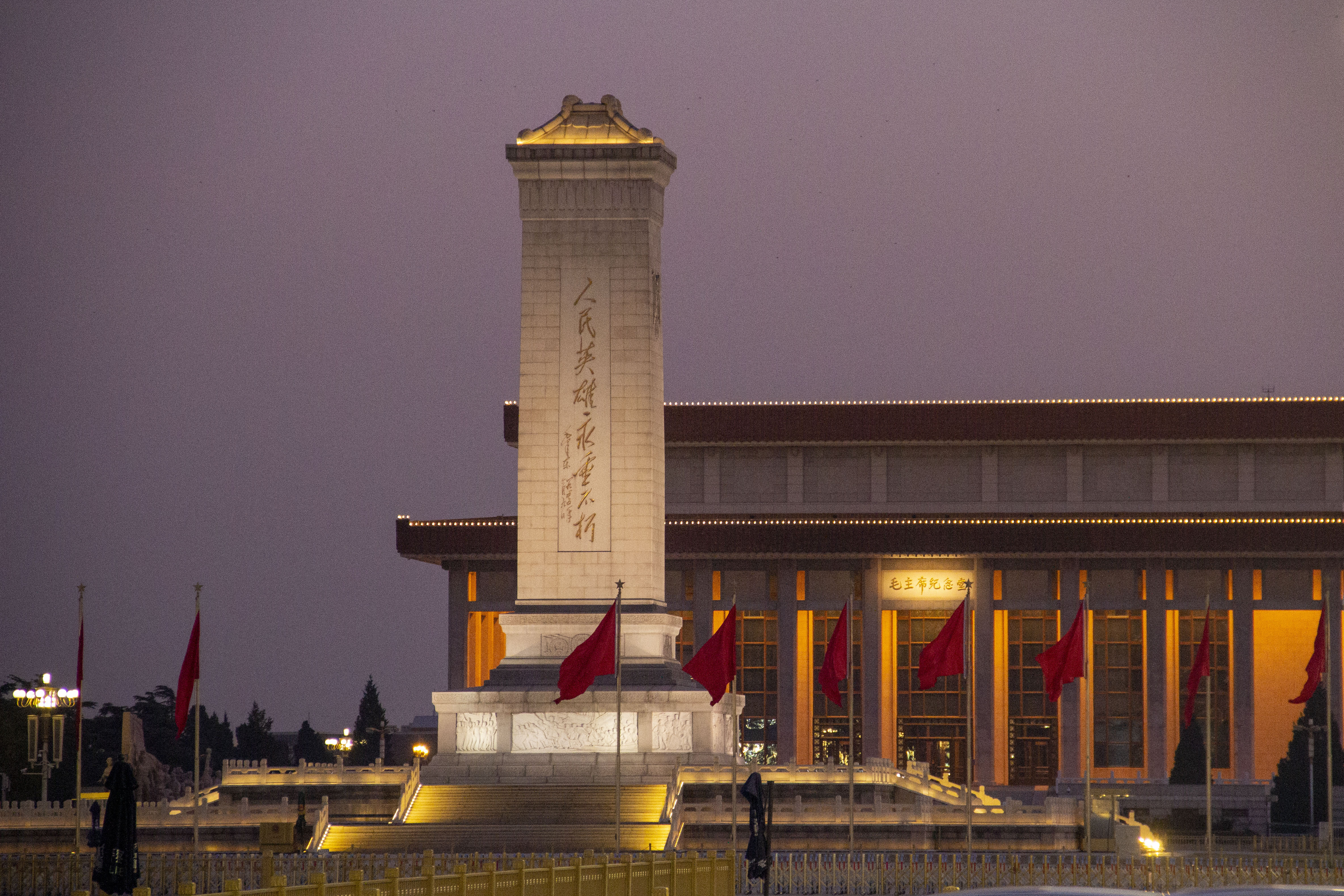
Monument to the People's Heroes and the Mausoleum of Mao Zedong occupy the center of the square

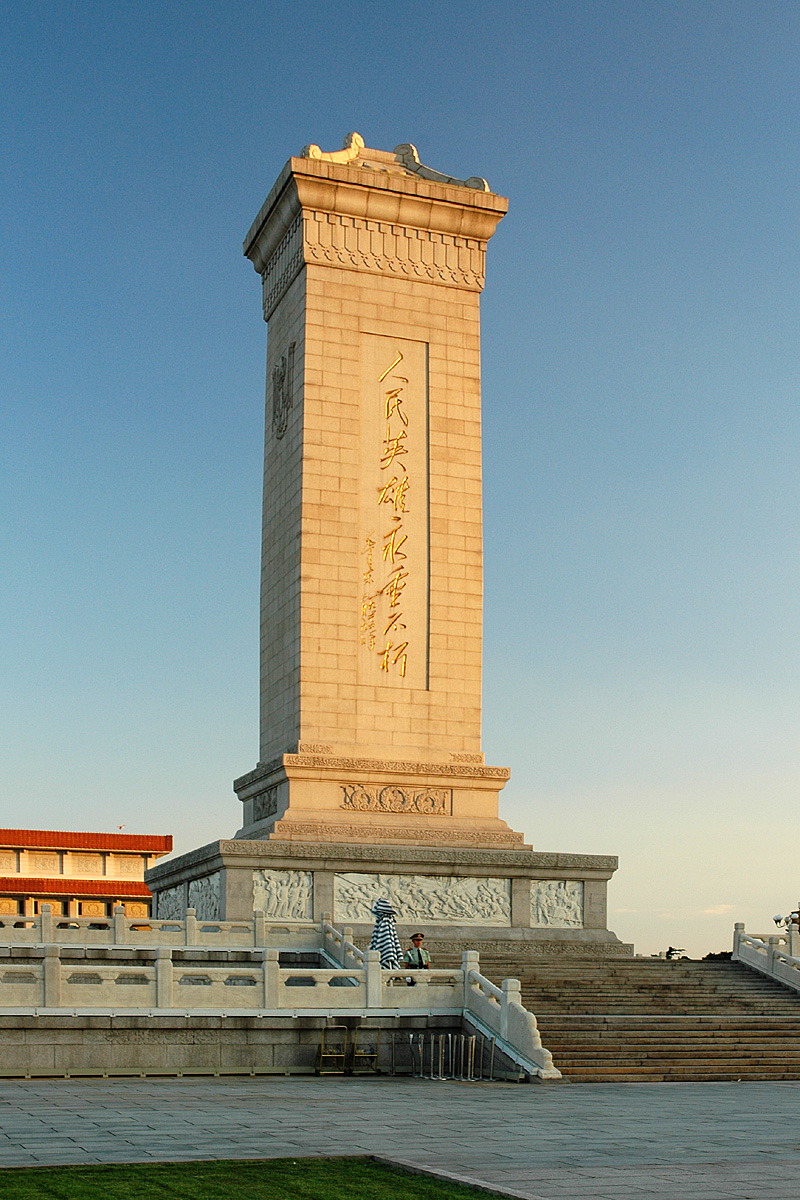
Monument to the People's Heroes

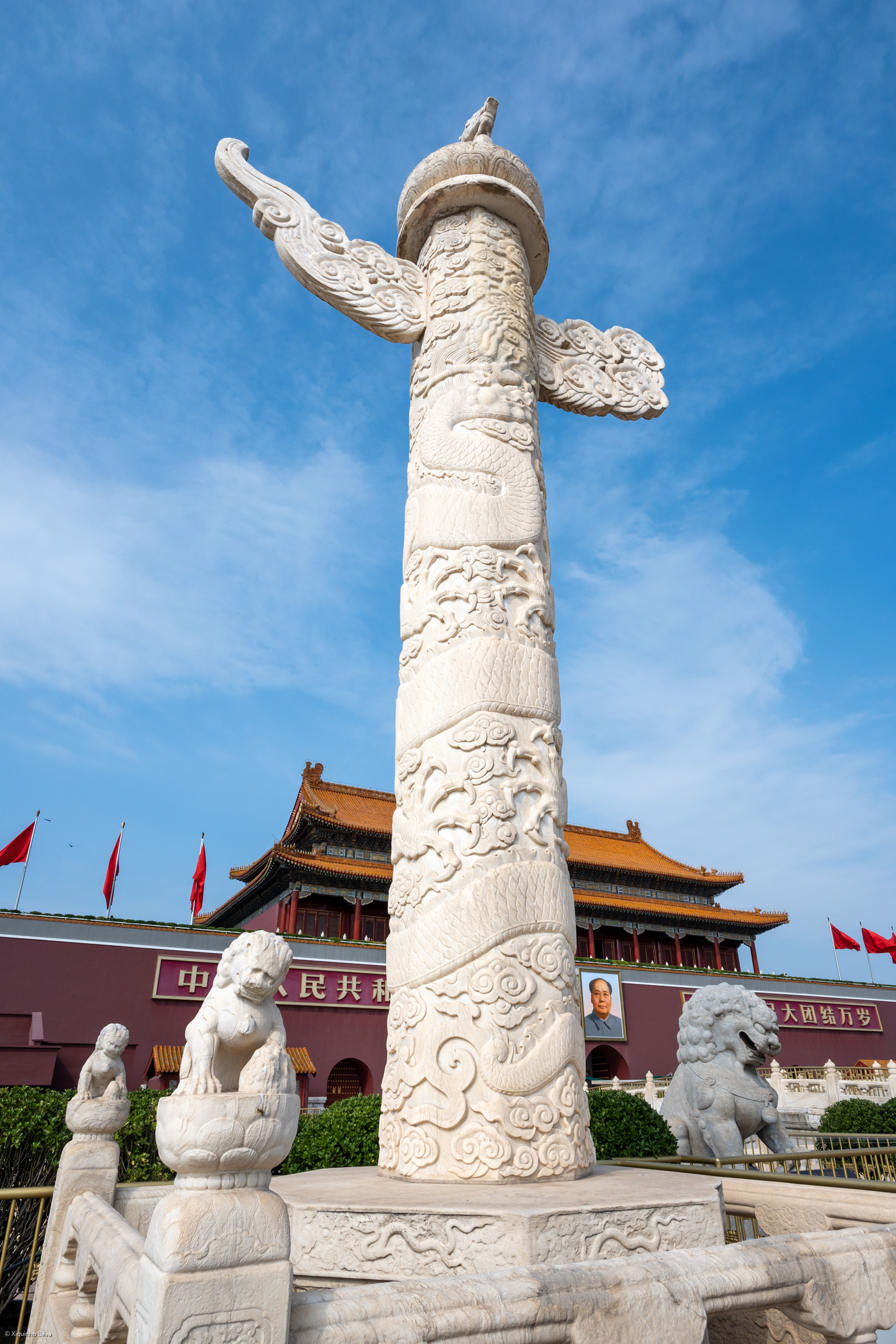
Huabiao in front of Tiananmen

=== Historical Events ===
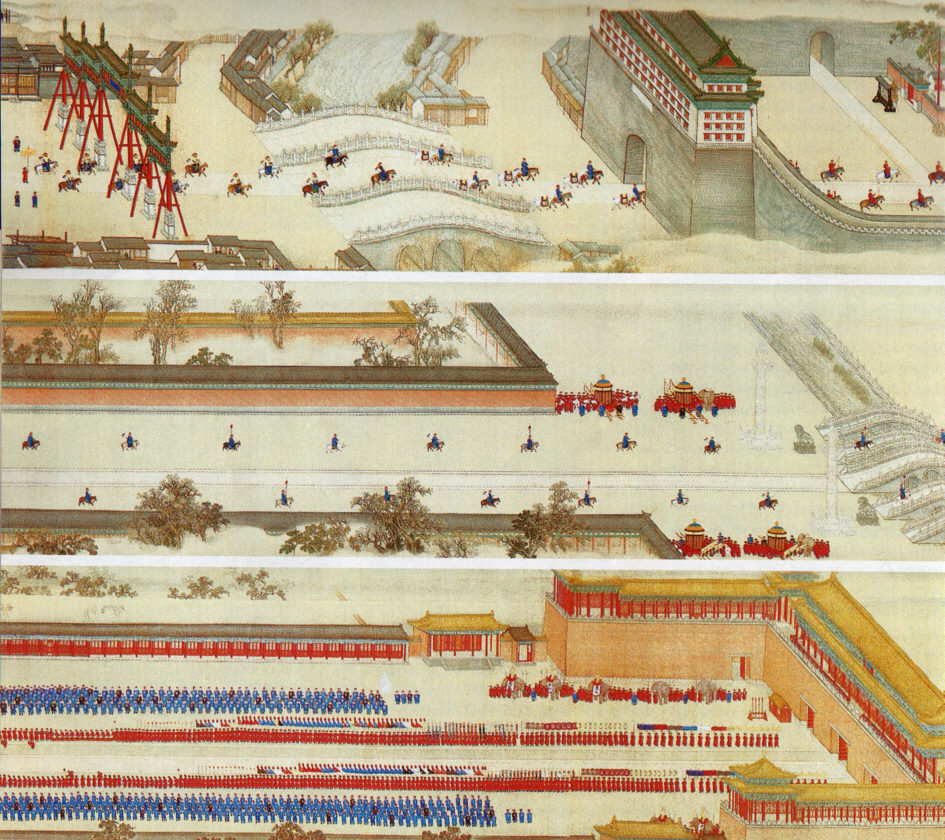
Kangxi Emperor and his escorts walking through Tiananmen after his tour in Southern China

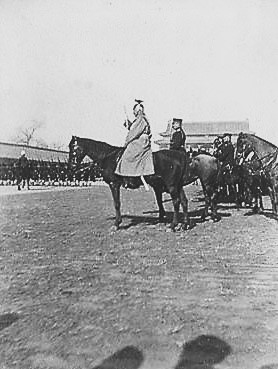
Commander-in-chief of the Eight-Nation Alliance, Alfred von Waldersee inspecting the army during the Boxer war, 1900

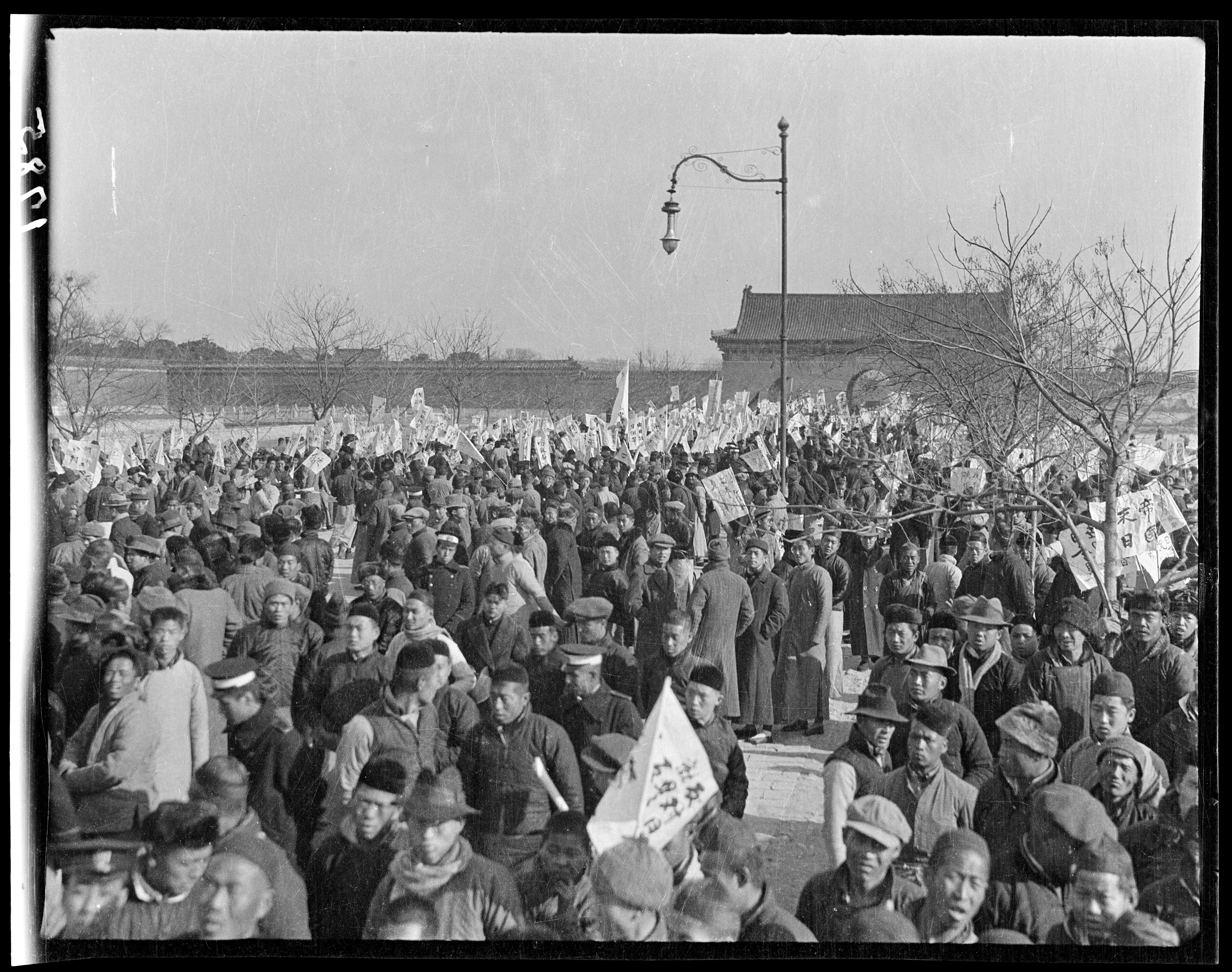
Students gathering for a demonstration in Tiananmen Square, 1917

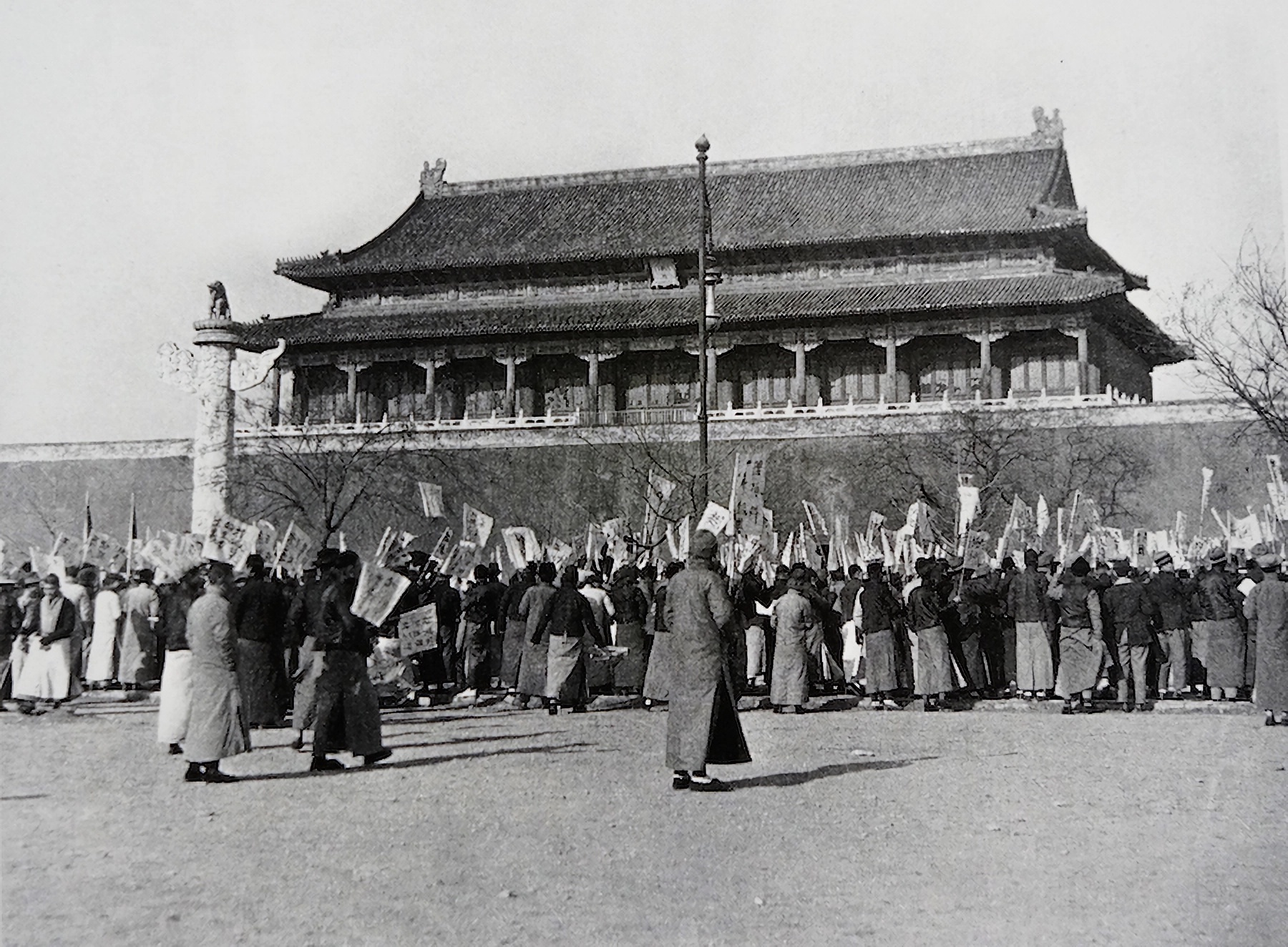
Students gathering to protest the Fuzhou Incident caused by Japanese, 1919

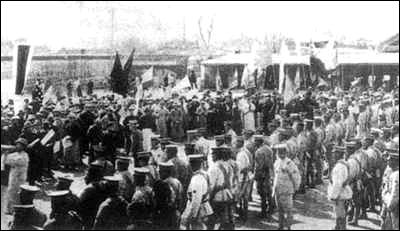
People protesting Beiyang government in 1926, which later led to the March 18 Massacre

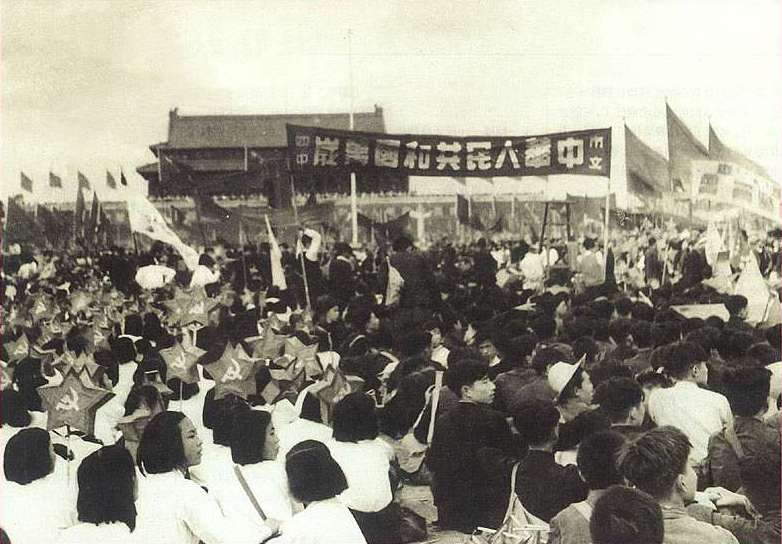
Students attending the founding ceremony of the People's Republic of China on October 1, 1949

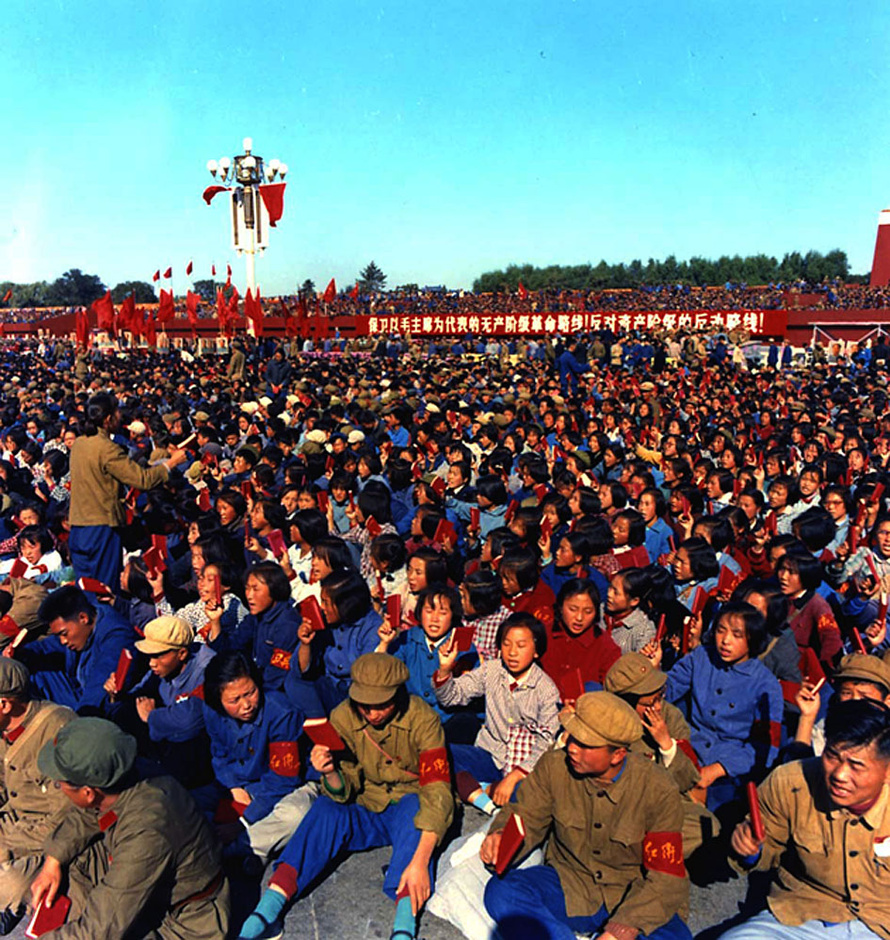
Red Guards gathering on Tian'anmen Square to be inspected by Mao during the Cultural Revolution, September 15, 1966

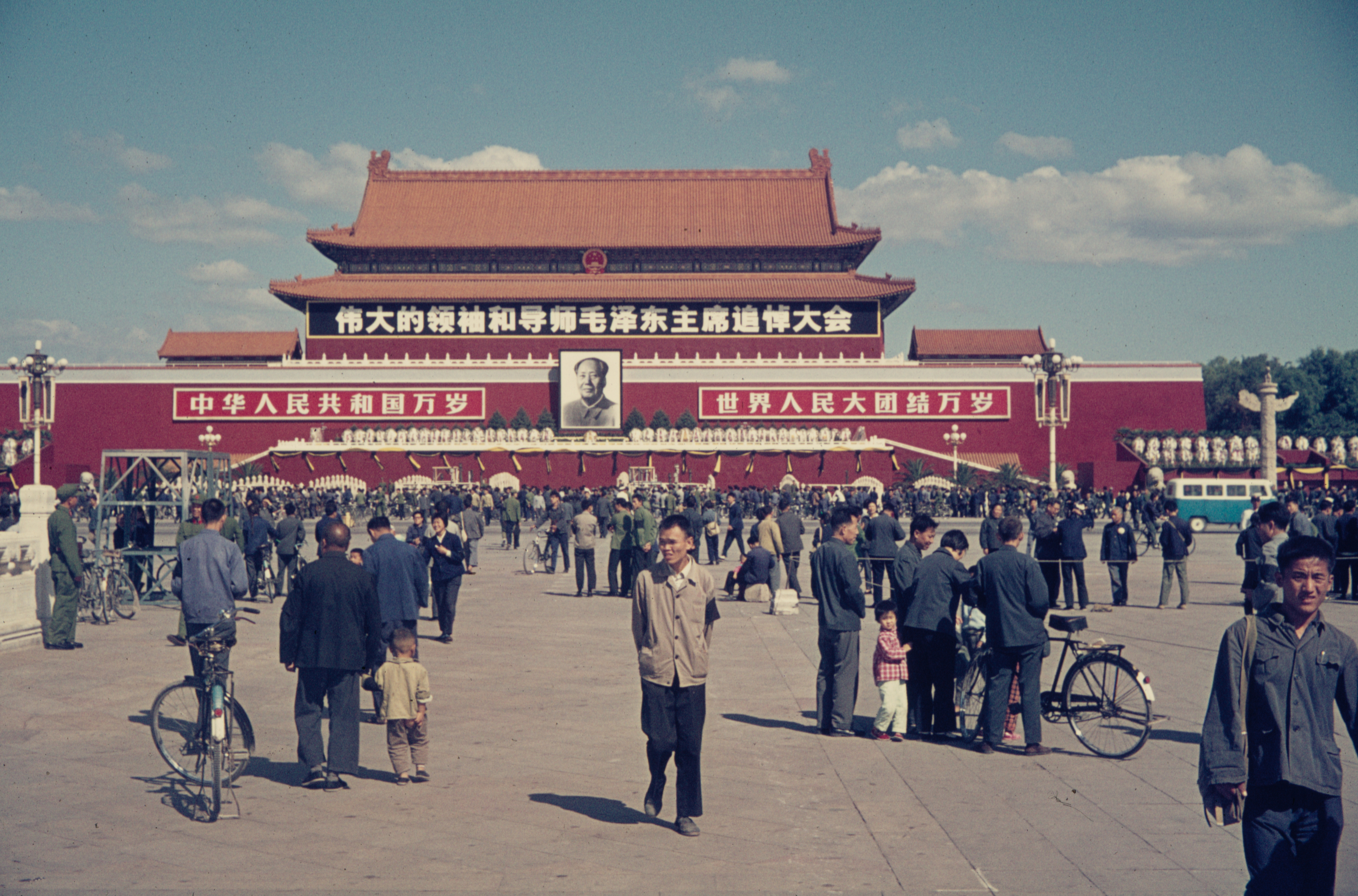
A few days after the official mourning ceremony for Mao Zedong, 12 September 1976

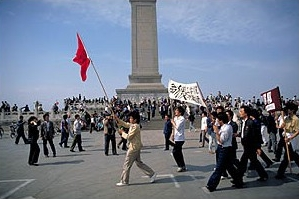
Student protesting at Tianmen Square on 2 June 1989

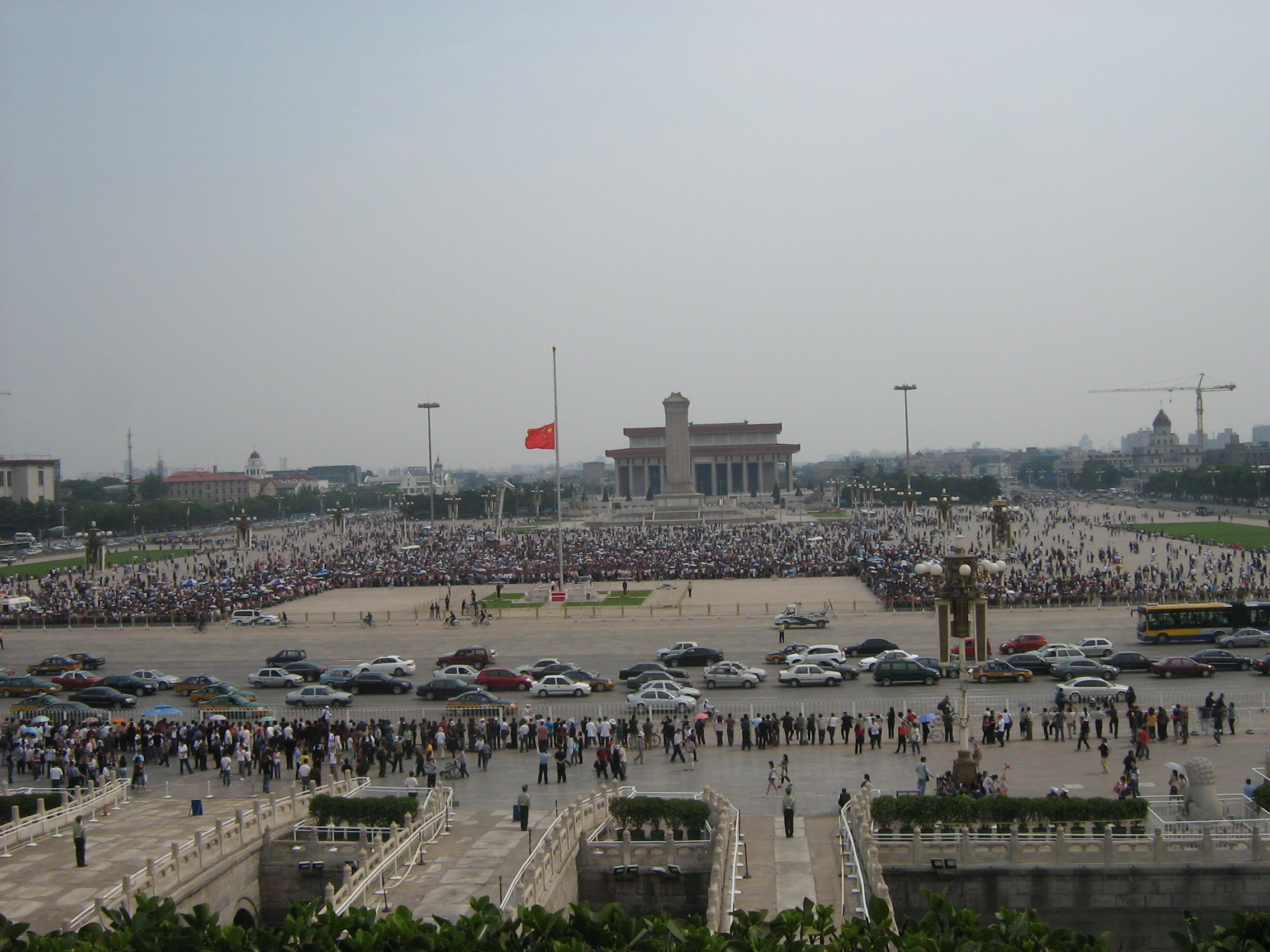
National mourning for the victims of the Sichuan earthquake, May 19, 2008

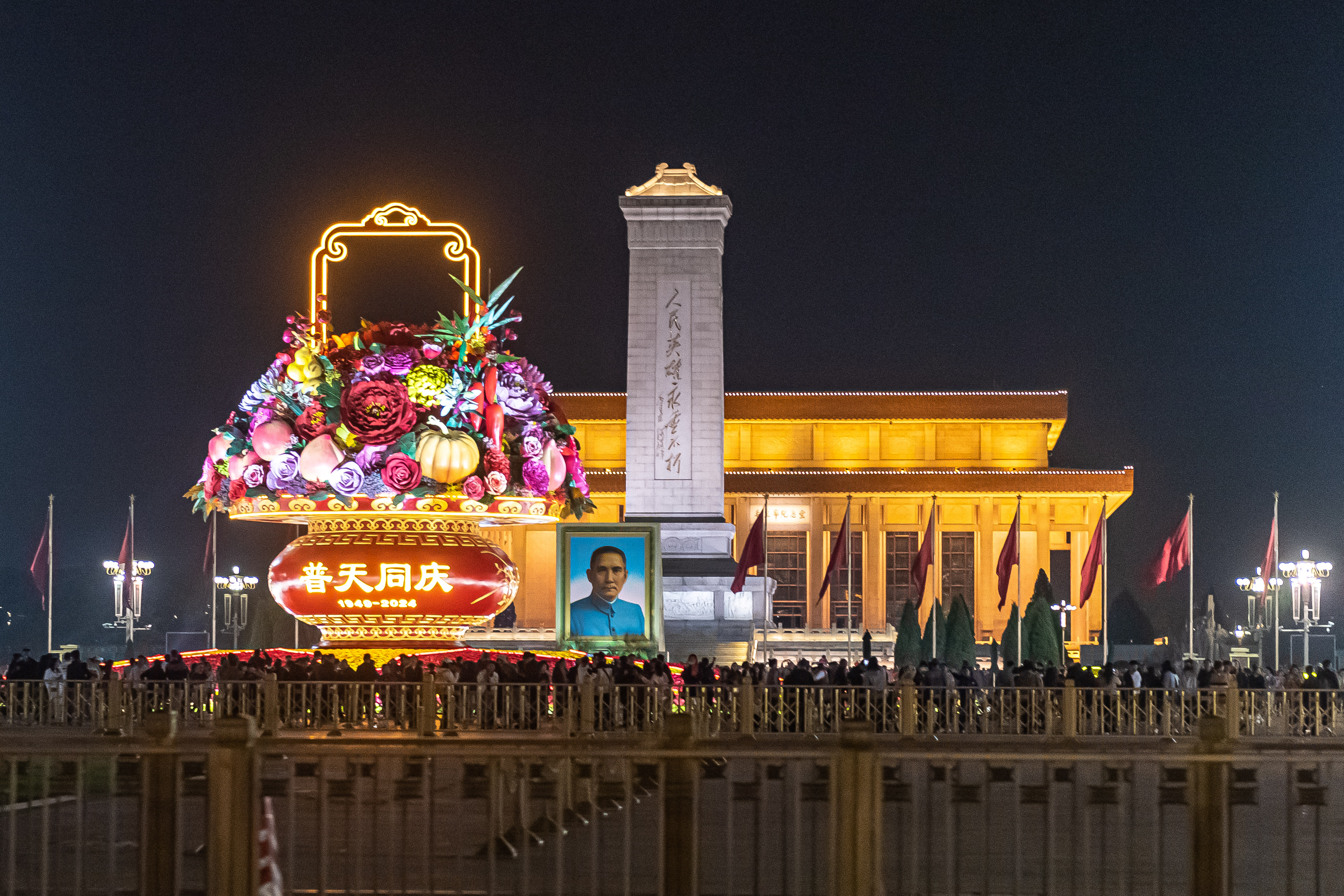
Celebration of the 75th anniversary of People' Republic of China, with portrait of Sun Yat-sen placed on the square, 2024

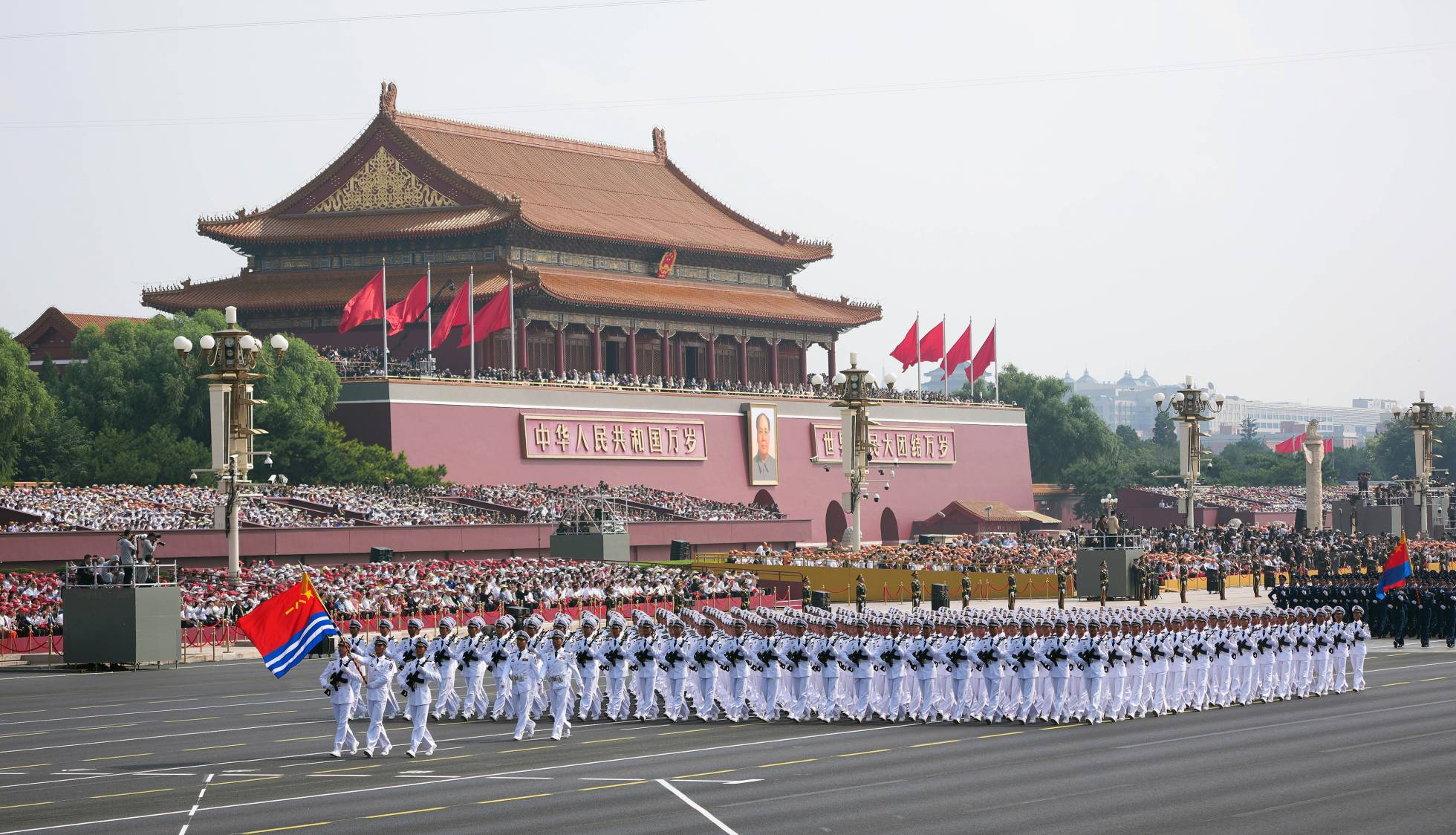
China Victory Day Parade on September 3, 2025, the day of Victory over Japan
