= Dismounting stele =

Stone tablet signage used in traditional East Asian architecture

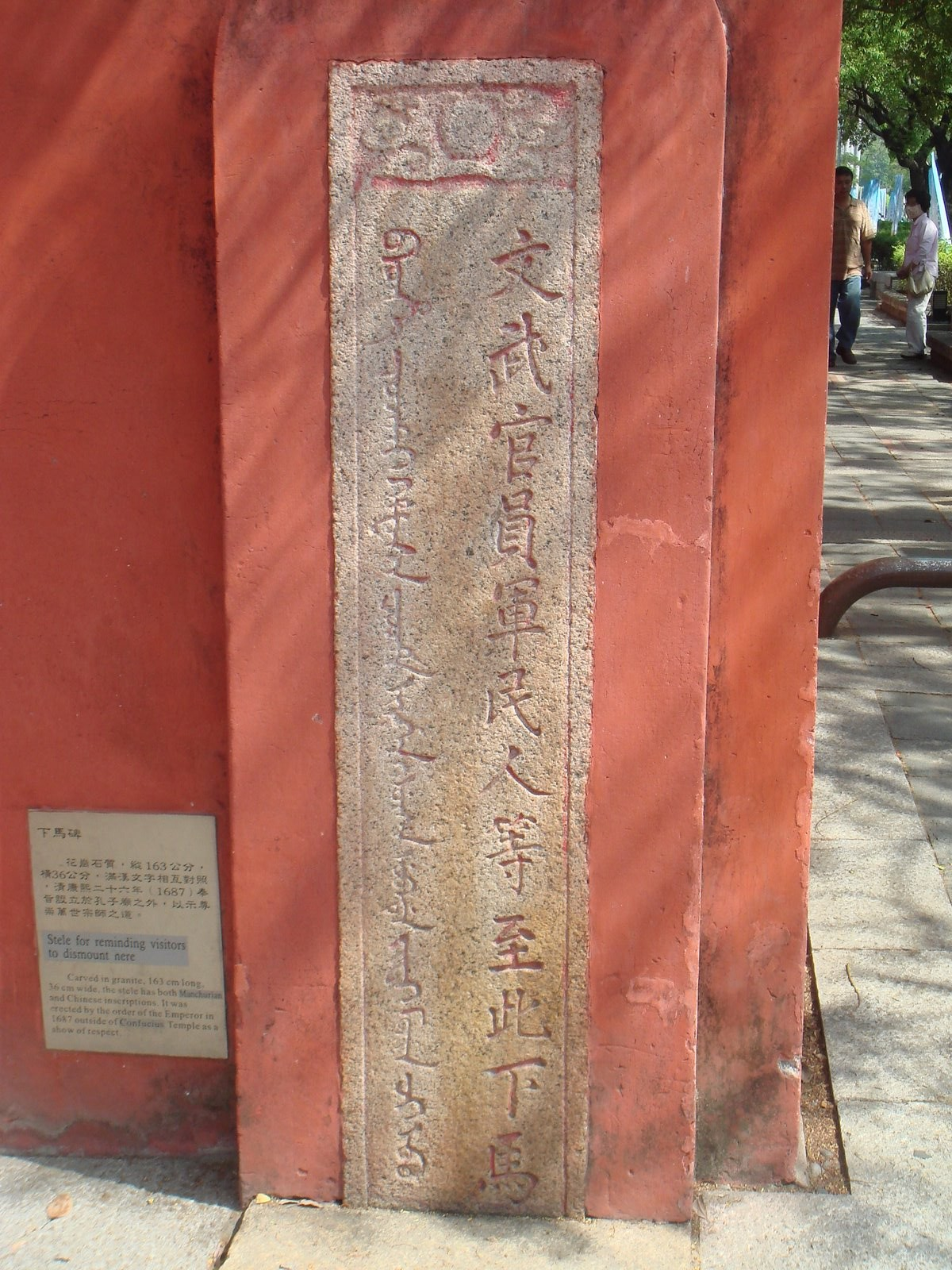
- Dismounting stele at Tainan's Confucian temple, reading in Chinese and Manchu "Civil and military officials, soldiers and citizens, all dismount from their horses here"
- Traditional Chinese: 下馬碑
- Simplified Chinese: 下马碑
- Literal meaning: dismounting stele(s)
Transcriptions
Standard Mandarin
- Hanyu Pinyin: xiàmǎbēi
- Wade–Giles: hsia-ma-pei

A dismounting stele is a stone tablet or stele traditionally erected outside important buildings or building complexes in Chinese and East Asian architecture. It gives notice of the nearest point to the location that riders should dismount horses or exit vehicles for properly respectful approach.

== Locations ==
Dismounting steles were placed in front of gates to important buildings or institutions such as imperial tombs, palaces, the Imperial City and major temples and shrines, especially Confucian temples. They could be placed singularly or in pairs on opposite sides of the path. Whether such steles are placed in front of a particular building was dictated by rules of protocol. In imperial times, this was generally controlled by the Ministry of Rites. The Emperor sometimes granted the placement of a dismounting stele as a sign of favor towards an institution, group or person.
