= Chan Prefecture =

Tang dynasty era prefecture in China

Chanzhou or Chan Prefecture (Chinese: 澶州) was a zhou (prefecture) in Imperial China seated in modern-day Puyang, Henan. It was established in 621 during the Tang dynasty.

In 1106 the Song dynasty elevated the prefecture to a higher status, changing its name to Kaide Prefecture (開德府). This name remained until 1142 when it was changed back to Chan Prefecture by the Jin dynasty, who had captured the territory from the Song dynasty. In 1144 it was renamed as Kai Prefecture (開州).

== Geography ==
The administrative region of Chan Prefecture in the Tang dynasty is under the administration of modern Puyang in northeastern Henan:

- Puyang
- Puyang County
- Qingfeng County
- Fan County
- Nanle County

== See also ==
- Kaizhou (disambiguation)
