= G45 Daqing–Guangzhou Expressway =

Road in China

Daqing–Guangzhou Expressway
- 大庆－广州高速公路
- Daguang Expressway 大广高速公路

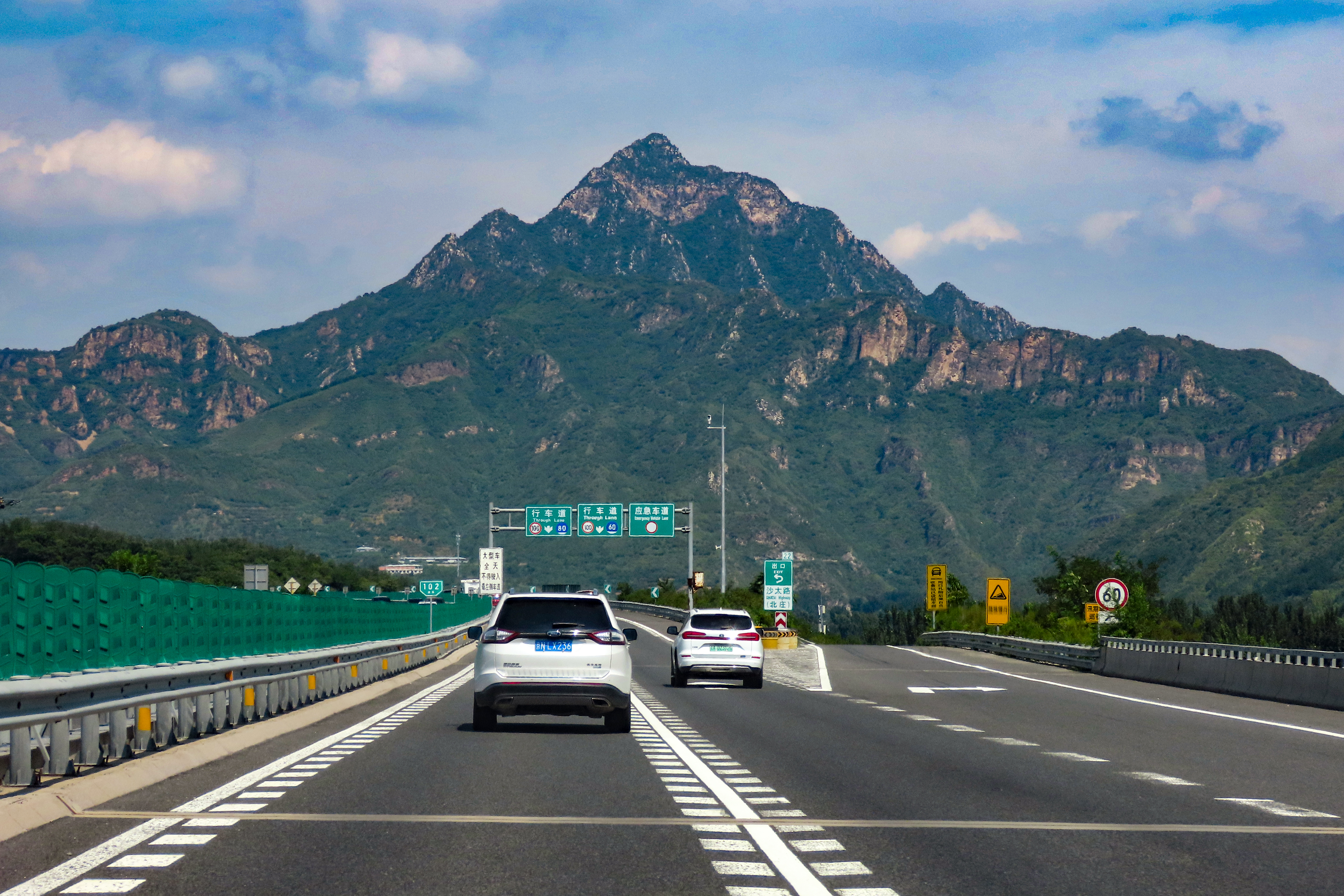
- The expressway in Miyun District, Beijing in 2020

Route information
- Length: 3,550 km (2,210 mi)

Major junctions
- North end: Daqing Sartu Airport, Sartu District, Daqing, Heilongjiang
- South end: G15 / G1508 / Guangdong S41 in Guangzhou, Guangdong

Location
- Country: China

Highway system
- National Trunk Highway System; Primary; Auxiliary; National Highways; Transport in China
| ← G4231 | → G4501 |

The Daqing–Guangzhou Expressway (大庆－广州高速公路), designated as G45 and commonly referred to as the Daguang Expressway (大广高速公路) is a north-south bound expressway that connects the cities of Daqing, Heilongjiang, and Guangzhou, Guangdong in China. When fully complete, it will be 3,550 km (2,210 mi) in length.

== Route ==
Once complete the Daqing–Guangzhou Expressway will run from Daqing, Heilongjiang to Guangzhou, Guangdong. It passes through the following major cities;

- Daqing, Heilongjiang
- Songyuan, Jilin
- Shuangliao, Jilin
- Tongliao, Inner Mongolia
- Chifeng, Inner Mongolia
- Chengde, Hebei
- Beijing
- Bazhou, Hebei
- Hengshui, Hebei
- Puyang, Henan
- Kaifeng, Henan
- Zhoukou, Henan
- Huanggang, Hubei
- Huangshi, Hubei
- Xinyu, Jiangxi
- Ji'an, Jiangxi
- Ganzhou, Jiangxi
- Guangzhou, Guangdong

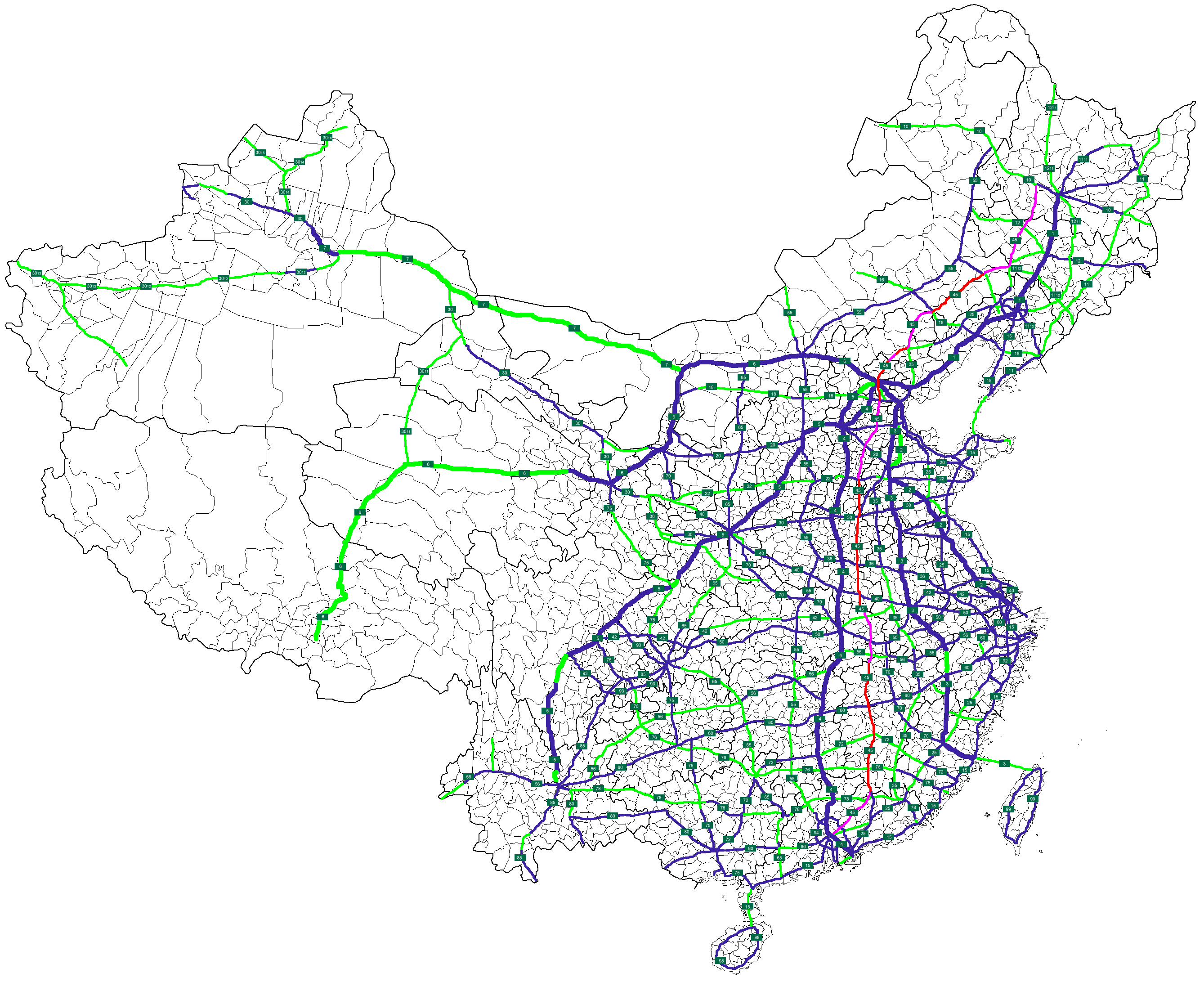
G45 route, shown in red

G45 Daguang Expressway in Hubei Province

== History ==
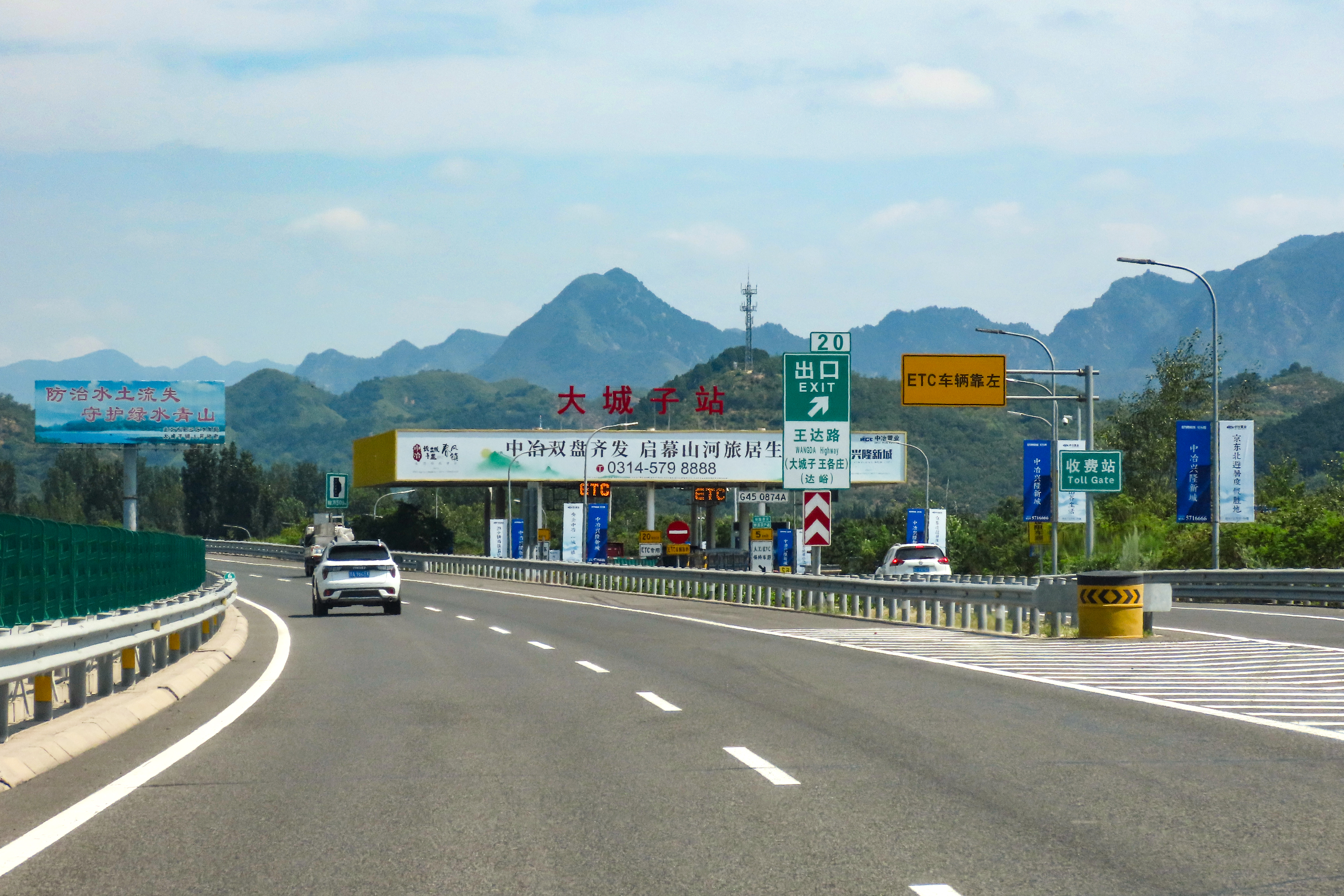
Dachengzi toll gate in Miyun District, August 2020

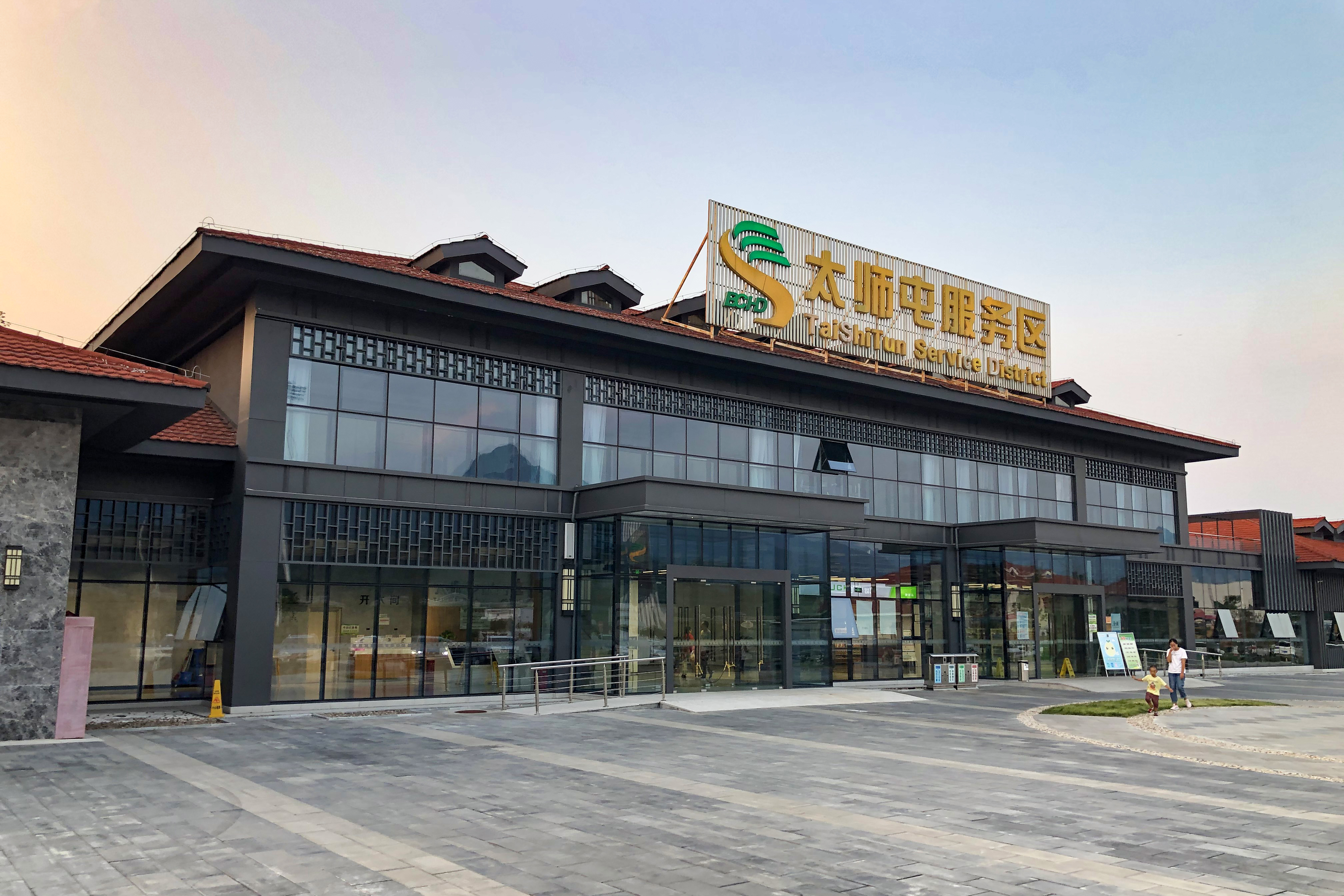
Taishitun service area in Miyun District, August 2020

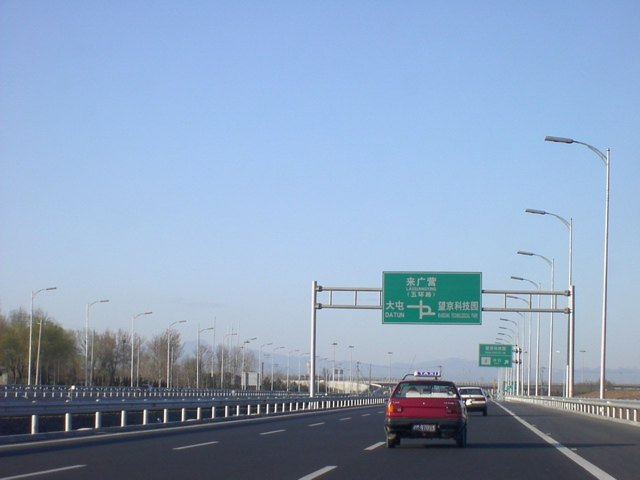
The expressway within the 5th Ring Road, March 2003

The first section of the expressway opened in the north of Beijing in 2002. Northeast of Beijing, the 210 kilometre section to Chengde was known as the Jingcheng expressway(Chinese: 京承高速公路; pinyin: Jīngchéng Gāosù Gōnglù) and south, the section to Kaifeng was known as the Jingkai Expressway (京开高速公路, Hanyu Pinyin: Jīngkāi Gāosù Gōnglù). Expressway naming was standardised across China in 2009 and the entire length from Daqing to Guangzhou became the G45 expressway.

== Detailed Route ==
The following is a list of towns, cities and major interchanges along the expressway as of 2012.

| Province | Destinations |
|---|---|
| Heilongjiang | The expressway begins at Daqing Sartu Airport |
| Heilongjiang | G10 Suifenhe–Manzhouli Expressway |
| Heilongjiang | Daqing |
| Heilongjiang | Datong |
| Heilongjiang | Honggang District |
| Heilongjiang | Zhaozhou County |
| Heilongjiang | Zhaoyuan |
| Jilin | Songyuan |
| Jilin | G12 Hunchun–Ulanhot Expressway |
| Jilin | Changling |
| Jilin | Shuangliao |
| Jilin | G25 Changchun–Shenzhen Expressway |
| Inner Mongolia | Tongliao |
| Inner Mongolia | Naiman |
| Inner Mongolia | Aohan |
| Inner Mongolia | Chifeng |
| Inner Mongolia | G16 Dandong–Xilinhot Expressway |
| | Chifeng, Chifeng Yulong Airport, Harqin |
Hebei
| Hebei | Chengde |
| Hebei | G25 Changchun–Shenzhen Expressway |
| Hebei | China National Highway 112 |
| Hebei | Luanping |
| Beijing | Gubeikou |
| Beijing | Miyun |
| Beijing | Huairou, China National Highway 111 |
| Beijing | 6th Ring Road at Gaoliying |
| Beijing | Northern Airport Expressway |
| Beijing | Southern Airport Expressway |
| Beijing | 5th Ring Road at Laiguangying |
| Beijing | 4th Ring Road at the Wanghe Bridge |
| Beijing | The expressway ends the 3rd Ring Road in Taiyanggong, Beijing |
| Beijing | The expressway begins again at Yuquanying on the 3rd Ring Road |
| Beijing | 4th Ring Road |
| Beijing | Xihongmen |
| Beijing | 5th Ring Road |
| Beijing | Daxing |
| Beijing | 6th Ring Road) |
| Beijing | Panggezhuang |
| Beijing | China National Highway 106 at Yufa |
| Hebei | Gu'an County |
| Hebei | Langzhou Expressway |
| Hebei | China National Highway 112 at Bazhou |
| Hebei | G18 Rongcheng–Wuhai Expressway |
| Hebei | Renqiu |
| Hebei | Baocan Expressway |
| Hebei | Suning |
| Hebei | Raoyang |
| Hebei | G1811 Huanghua–Shijiazhuang Expressway at Shenzhou |
| Hebei | Wuyi |
| Hebei | Taocheng |
| Hebei | Hengde Expressway |
| Hebei | Jizhou and Zaoqiang |
| Hebei | G20 Qingdao–Yinchuan Expressway |
| Hebei | Xinglin Expressway at Wei |
| Hebei | G22 Qingdao–Lanzhou Expressway |
| Hebei | Daming |
| Henan | Nanle |
| Henan | S22 Nanlin Expressway |
| Henan | Qingfeng |
| Henan | S26 Fanhui Expressway at Hualong |
| Henan | Puyang |
| Henan | S28 Changji Expressway |
| Henan | Changyuan |
| Henan | Fenqiu |
| Henan | The expressway crosses the Yellow River over the Kaifeng Yellow River Bridge |
| Henan | G30 Lianyungang–Khorgas Expressway |
| Henan | China National Highway 220 and China National Highway 310 |
| Henan | Kaifeng |
| Henan | S83 Lannan Expressway |
| Henan | Tongxu |
| Henan | S32 Yongdeng Expressway |
| Henan | Xihua |
| Henan | S81 Shangzhou Expressway at Zhoukou |
| Henan | G36 Nanjing–Luoyang Expressway at Xiangcheng |
| Henan | Pingyu |
| Henan | S38 Xinyang Expressway |
| Henan | Xincai |
| Henan | Xixian |
| Henan | China National Highway 312 at Huangchuan |
| Henan | G40 Shanghai–Xi'an Expressway |
| Henan | Guangshan |
| Henan | Xinxian |
| Hubei | G42 Shanghai–Chengdu Expressway |
| Hubei | Macheng |
| Hubei | S5 Wuying Expressway |
| Hubei | Tuanfeng |
| Hubei | Huanggang |
| Hubei | G50 Shanghai–Chongqing Expressway |
| Hubei | The expressway crosses the Yangtze River over the E’dong Yangtze River Bridge |
| Hubei | Huangshigang |
| Hubei | Huangshigang |
| Jiangxi | to the Wuning County - currently incomplete |
| Jiangxi | The expressway begins again in the Wuning County |
| Jiangxi | Xiushui |
| Jiangxi | Yifeng |
| Jiangxi | China National Highway 320 at Shanggao |
| Jiangxi | G60 Shanghai–Kunming Expressway at Fenji |
| Jiangxi | Xinyu |
| Jiangxi | Anfu |
| Jiangxi | S69 Zhangji Expressway at Jizhou |
| Jiangxi | Ji'an |
| Jiangxi | G72 Quanzhou–Nanning Expressway |
| Jiangxi | S50 Taijing Expressway to inggangshan Airport |
| Jiangxi | China National Highway 319 at Taihe |
| Jiangxi | Wan'an |
| Jiangxi | Suichuan |
| Jiangxi | G76 Xiamen–Chengdu Expressway, Ganzhou Huangjin Airport |
| Jiangxi | China National Highway 323 to Ganzhou and Nankang |
| Jiangxi | S4503 Ganzhou Ring Expressway |
| Jiangxi | S66 Ganshao Expressway |
| Jiangxi | Xinfeng |
| Jiangxi | Longnan |
| Jiangxi | G4511 Longnan–Heyuan Expressway |
| Jiangxi | Longnan |
| Guangdong | to Conghua section is currently incomplete |
| Guangdong | The expressway starts again at Conghua |
| Guangdong | G4 Beijing–Hong Kong and Macau Expressway |
| Guangdong | The expressways combines with the S41 Airport Expressway on the outskirts of Guangzhou near Huadu |
