= Puyang railway station =

Railway station in Puyang, Henan

Puyang 濮阳
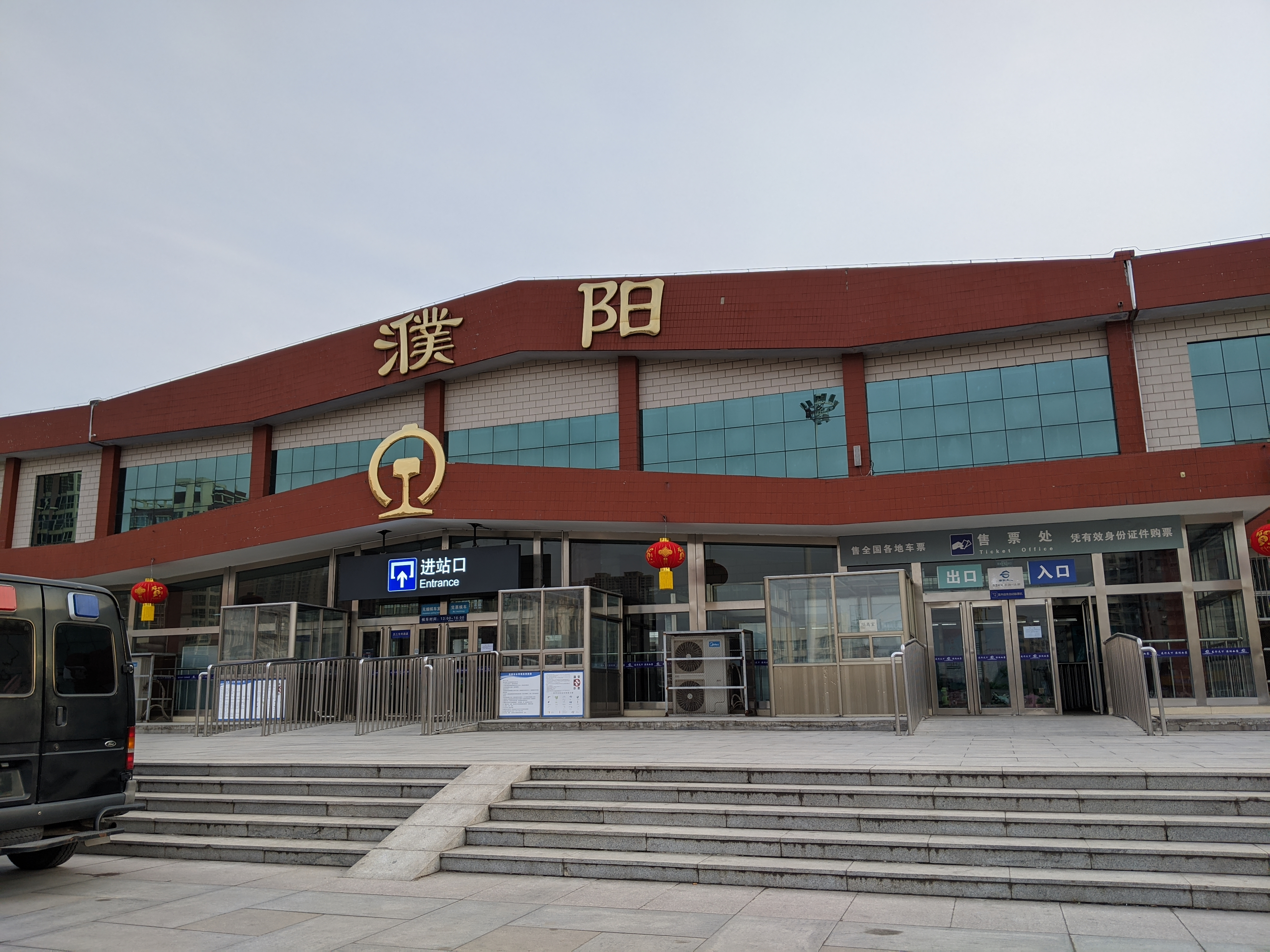

General information
- Location: Hualong District, Puyang, Henan; China
- Coordinates: 35°44′28″N 115°1′6.5″E
- Line: Shanxi–Henan–Shandong railway
Location

Puyang railway station (Chinese: 濮阳站) is a railway station in Hualong District, Puyang, Henan, China. It is an intermediate stop on the Shanxi–Henan–Shandong railway and the eastern terminus of passenger services.

On 18 March 2016, a passenger service was introduced. It consists of a single daily arrival from Zhengzhou followed by a single daily departure back to Zhengzhou. The journey times are uncompetitive with that of coaches.

== See also ==
- Puyang East railway station
