= Shuangmiao Township, Qingfeng County =

Shuangmiao Township 双庙乡
- Township
- Location in Henan
- Coordinates: 35°49′12″N 115°10′29″E
- Country: People's Republic of China
- Province: Henan
- Prefecture-level city: Puyang
- County: Qingfeng
- Elevation: 55 m (180 ft)
- Time zone: UTC+8 (China Standard)
- Postal code: 457001

Shuangmiao Township (simplified Chinese: 双庙乡; traditional Chinese: 雙廟鄉; pinyin: Shuāngmiào Xiāng; lit. 'double temple') is a township of Qingfeng County in northeastern Henan province, China, located about 9 kilometres (5.6 mi) northeast of Hualong District, Puyang. As of 2011, it has 29 villages under its administration.

== See also ==
- List of township-level divisions of Henan
