= Northern Airport Expressway =

Toll road in Beijing, China

Coordinates: 40.1217°N 116.5312°E

Northern Airport Expressway

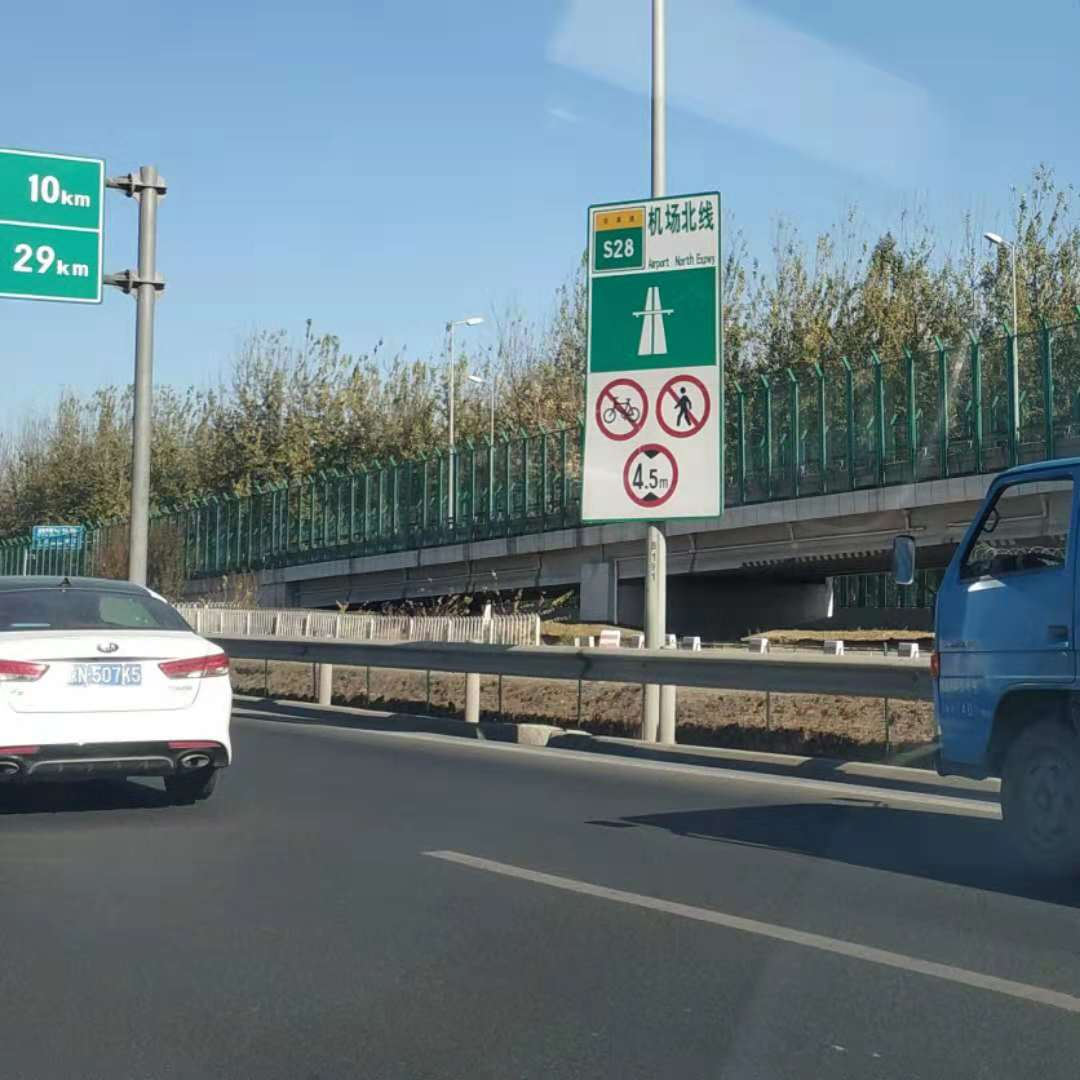

Route information
- Length: 11.29 km (7.02 mi)
- Existed: 2006–present

Major junctions
- From: G45 in Changping District, Beijing
- To: Beijing Capital International Airport

Location
- Country: China
- Province: Beijing

Highway system
- Transport in China
← Beijing S26	→ Beijing S32

The Capital Airport Northern Expressway, officially numbered S28, is an 11.29 km toll road extension that runs from G45 Daqing–Guangzhou Expressway (formerly Beijing-Chengde Expressway) to the Beijing Capital International Airport in Beijing, China. It was opened in September 2006. The opening of this road has helped to alleviate traffic on the Capital Airport Expressway, which had been the sole highway link to the airport. The Capital Airport Northern Expressway allows drivers from Zhongguancun and points north and west of the city to head north first on Jingcheng Expressway before going directly east to the airport, instead of having to go east on the 4th Ring Road to get on the Capital Airport Expressway, where traffic is often clogged near the Siyuan Bridge.

== Sources ==
- Article on beijing.org.cn
