= Fufengqiao station =

Beijing Subway Line 16 station

Fufengqiao 富丰桥
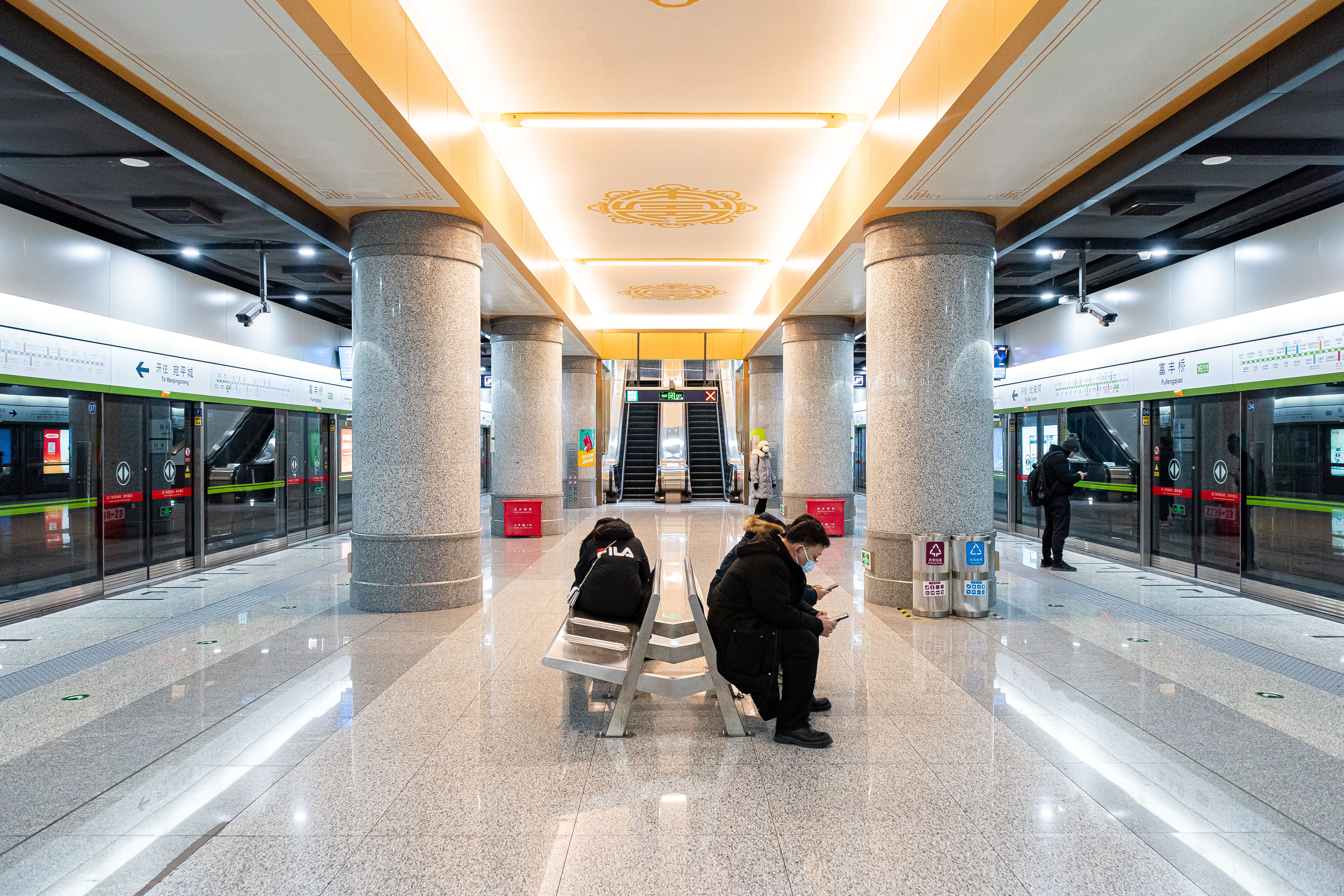
- Platform

General information
- Location: Intersection of 4th Ring Road and Fufeng Rd./Kexing Rd., Fengtai District, Beijing; China
- Coordinates: 39°50′06″N 116°16′51″E
- Operator: Beijing MTR Metro Line 16 Corp., Ltd.
- Line: Line 16
- Platforms: 2 (1 island platform)
- Tracks: 2

Construction
- Structure type: Underground
- Accessible: Yes

History
- Opened: December 31, 2022; 3 years ago

Services
Preceding station	Beijing Subway	Following station
Fengtai Nanlu towards Bei'anhe	Line 16	Kandan towards Wanpingcheng
Location

Fufengqiao station (Chinese: 富丰桥站; pinyin: Fùfēngqiáo zhàn) is a station on Line 16 of the Beijing Subway. The station opened on 31 December 2022.

== Station layout ==
The station has an underground island platform. There are 4 exits, lettered A, B, C and D. Exits A and C are accessible via elevators.

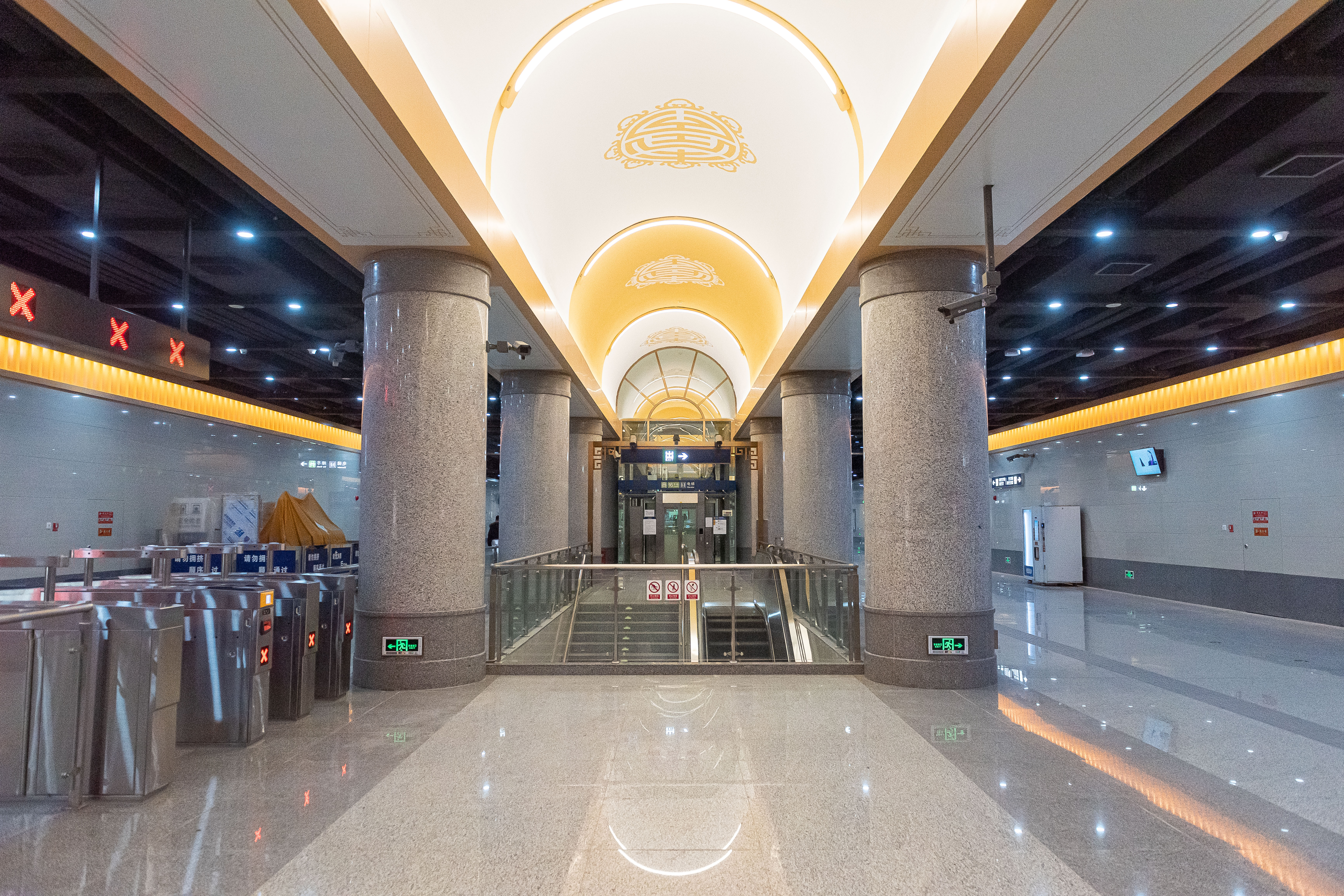
Concourse
