= Shanxi–Henan–Shandong railway =

Freight railway in China

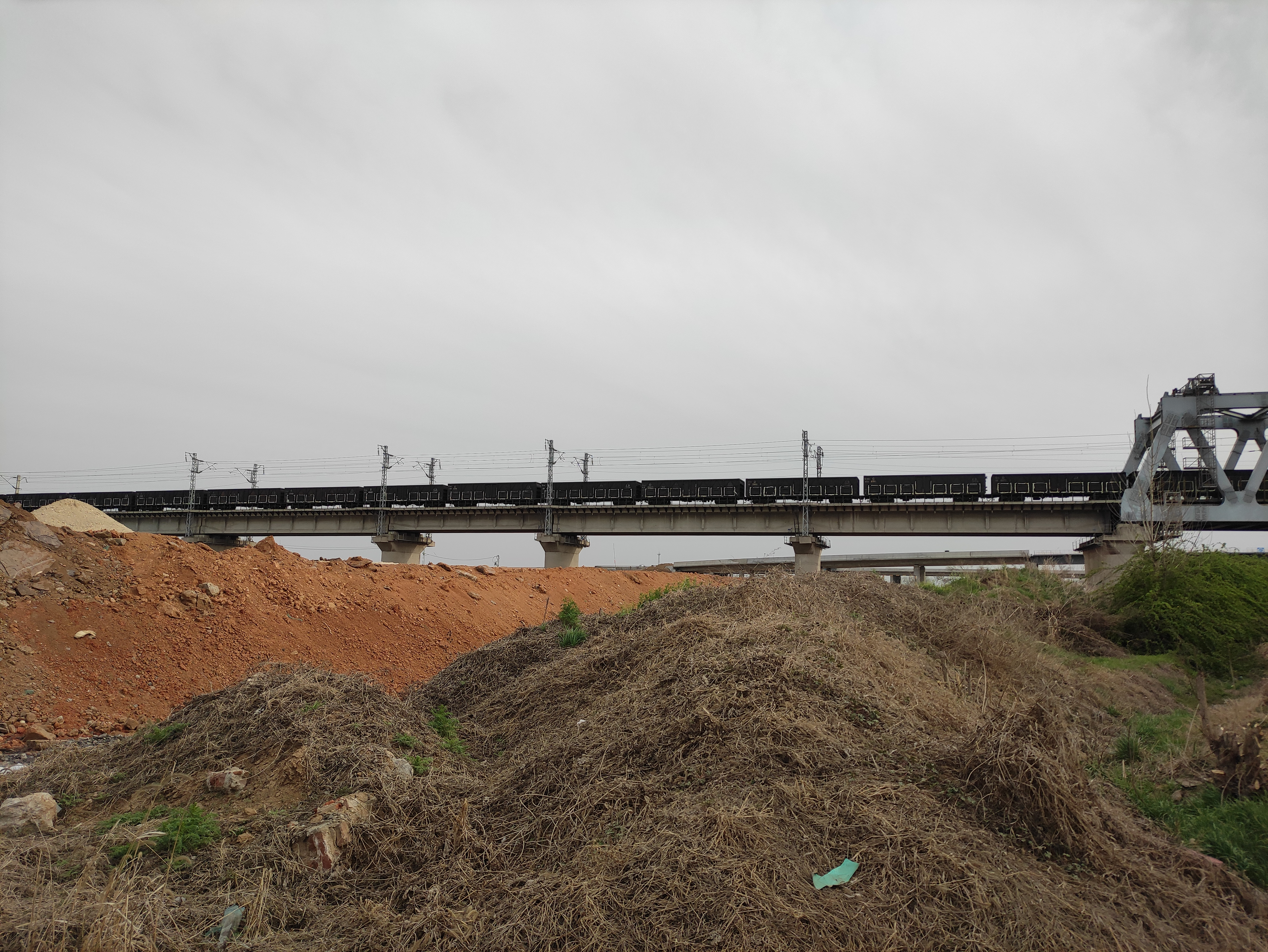
Shanxi–Henan–Shandong railway in Shandong

The Shanxi–Henan–Shandong railway (simplified Chinese: 晋豫鲁铁路; traditional Chinese: 晋豫鲁鐵路; pinyin: jìnyùlǔ tiělù) or the Jinyulu railway, also known as the Shanxi South Central railway or the Watang–Rizhao railway, is an electrified double-track heavy freight railway across northern China. The line runs 1,260 km (780 mi) from the village of Watang in Lüliang, Shanxi Province to the port of Rizhao in Shandong Province, and is named after the three provinces through which it passes Jin (Shanxi), Yu (Henan) and Lu (Shandong). The line is the world's longest heavy freight railway and is designed to facilitate the export of coal from Shanxi to overseas markets. The line can accommodate train speeds of up to 120 km/h (75 mph). Cities along route include Lüliang, Liulin, Hongdong, Changzhi and Pingshun in Shanxi; Linzhou, Anyang, Tangyin, Puyang, Hebi, Fan County and Taiqian County in Henan; Liangshan County, Dongping, Ningyang, Xintai, Laiwu, Yiyuan, Yishui, Ju County, Junan and Rizhao in Shandong. The line was built from 2010 to 2014 and operations began on December 30, 2014.

== Line description ==
The Jinyulu railway passes through mountainous terrain in south central Shanxi and central Shandong. Bridges and tunnels account for 46.8% of the line's total length. The line provides central Shanxi with another rail outlet to the sea and can carry 200 million tons of freight per year.

The lines required 103.8 billion yuan in investments and as of 2012, was jointly owned by China's railway ministry (34.29% of shares); the Shanxi Energy & Transport Investment Company, a company owned by the Shanxi Provincial Government (20%); Bank of China (14.45%); and local governments and other coal companies.

== Passenger service ==
On 18 March 2016, a passenger service was introduced on a section of the line. One train per day runs to and from Puyang railway station, using the section of the line between Tangyin and Puyang.

== Rail connections ==
Shanxi

- Liulin: Taiyuan–Zhongwei–Yinchuan railway
- Hongdong: Datong–Puzhou railway
- Changzhi: Taiyuan–Jiaozuo railway, Handan–Changzhi railway

Henan

- Anyang: connection to Beijing–Guangzhou railway
- Puyang: connection to Beijing–Kowloon railway

Shandong

- Taian: connection to Beijing–Shanghai railway
- Laiwu: connection to Xindian–Taian railway
- Rizhao: Yanzhou–Shijiusuo railway

== See also ==
- List of railways in China
