= Hualong =

Hualong may refer to:

== Places ==
=== In China ===
- Hualong District (华龙区), Puyang, Henan
- Hualong Hui Autonomous County (化隆回族自治县), of Haidong Prefecture, Qinghai
- Hualong, Guangzhou (化龙镇), town in Panyu District, Guangzhou, Guangdong
- Hualong, Shouguang (化龙镇), town in Shouguang City, Shandong

== Other uses ==
- Hualong One, a Chinese pressurized water nuclear reactor design.
