= Sifang Bridge =

Bridge in China

Sifang Bridge (Chinese : 四方桥, pinyin: sifang qiao, literal translation: four square/direction bridge) is an interchange bridge connecting 4th Ring Road and G1 Beijing–Harbin Expressway, which is located in Chaoyang District. Coordinates: 39.86993°N 116.48271°E

It is the origin (Exit 0; 0 km; south end) of G1 Beijing–Harbin Expressway, running eastwards to 5th Ring Road.

On 4th Ring Road, running north–south, it is marked as Exit 14.

Westwards, it runs towards Huawei Bridge on 3rd Ring Road.
