= Kaizhou =

Kaizhou or Kai Prefecture (開州) may refer to:

- Kaizhou District, Chongqing, China, formerly known as Kai County
- Kaizhou, a former prefecture in roughly modern Kaizhou District, Chongqing, China
- Kaizhou, a former prefecture in roughly modern Kaiyang County, Guiyang, China
- Kaizhou, a former prefecture in roughly modern Fengcheng, Liaoning, China
- Kaizhou, a name for the former Chan Prefecture in roughly modern Puyang County, Henan, China
