= Yuegezhuang =

Yuegezhuang (simplified Chinese: 岳各庄; traditional Chinese: 嶽各莊; pinyin: Yuègèzhuāng) is a part of the city of Beijing to the southwest.

Yuegezhuang is a transportational node; the 4th Ring Road and the Jingshi Expressway interconnect at Yuegezhuang.

Before the western 4th Ring Road was opened to traffic, Yuegezhuang Bridge was an elevated roundabout bridge, much like the bridges seen on the eastern stretch of the 2nd Ring Road. With the 4th Ring Road's opening, however, multi-level flyovers were added to the original structure.

Between Yuegezhuang and Wanping (further west) lies an industrialised area known as Xidaokou.
