= Wanghe Bridge =

Overpass and a nodal point in Beijing, China

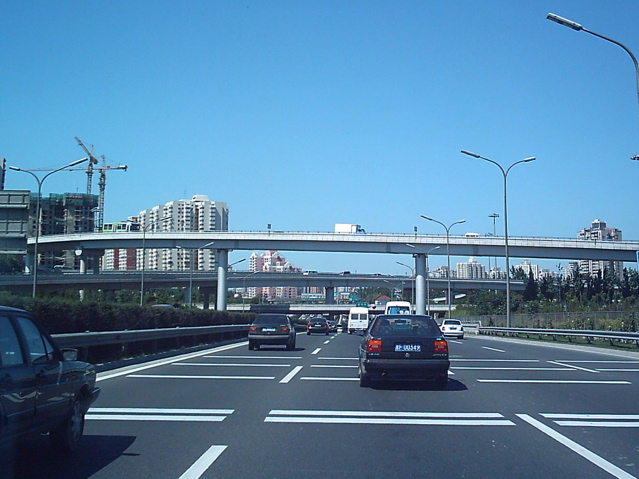
Wanghe Bridge as seen from the 4th Ring Road

Wanghe Bridge (simplified Chinese: 望和桥; traditional Chinese: 望和橋; pinyin: Wànghé Qiáo) is an overpass and an important nodal point in Beijing.

When it was first built it carried a railway line over the northeastern 4th Ring Road. This railway line connected to the now disused Hepingli Railway Station.

Wanghe Bridge was expanded in the early 2000s to let the CityRail (Line 13 (Beijing Subway) through. The tracks of the CityRail essentially were placed where the previous railway line used to be. Another expansion in 2002 resulted in the bridge that is seen today.

The bridge was, until September 28, 2004, the starting point of the Jingcheng Expressway towards Laiguangying and ultimately Chengde in Hebei province. The expressway now commences at Taiyanggong on the 3rd Ring Road. The expressway bridges are right over the 4th Ring Road, which runs under the bridge.

Wanghe Bridge consists of three layers. The first layer is an underpass for vehicles on the 4th Ring Road. The second layer is the Jingcheng Expressway running over the 4th Ring Road. Finally, a few flyover bridges—connection lines—form a more irregular third layer.

Traffic at Wanghe Bridge is usually smooth.

Wangle Bridge is labelled as Exit 1 on 4th Ring Road, because its connection with Jingcheng Expressway, which also defines Exit 1 for Taiyanggong Bridge on 3rd Ring Road, and Exit 1 for Laiguangying Bridge on 5th Ring Road.
