= Huaxiang Bridge =

Bridge in Fengtai District, Beijing, China

Huaxiang Bridge (Chinese: 花乡桥; pinyin: Huāxiāng Qiáo) is a bridge in Fengtai District, Beijing. It sits on the southern stretch of the 4th Ring Road.

== History ==
Before the 4th Ring Road signpost change in September 2004, it was named Huaxiang Bridge as it was located in Huaxiang Subdistrict, Fengtai District, Beijing. It is unknown why the name change took place, especially as the former name was representative—it was named after Huaxiang township it was situated next to. The official line was that the bridge had its name changed because it took the recommendations of the local Naming Bureau (which is in charge for naming localities) and named after Sihezhuang Village (Chinese: 四合庄; pinyin: Sìhézhuāng). The only other reason mentioned officially was that the name was "inaccurate". The former name itself, plus the proximity of Huaxiang, would naturally turn that "reason" on itself immediately.

The new name was already put into use a few days into the ring road sign change, which began on September 5, 2004.

In 2005, the bridge renamed again from Sihe Bridge to Huaxiang Bridge. The name is still in use.
