= Kandan station =

Beijing Subway Line 16 station

Kandan 看丹
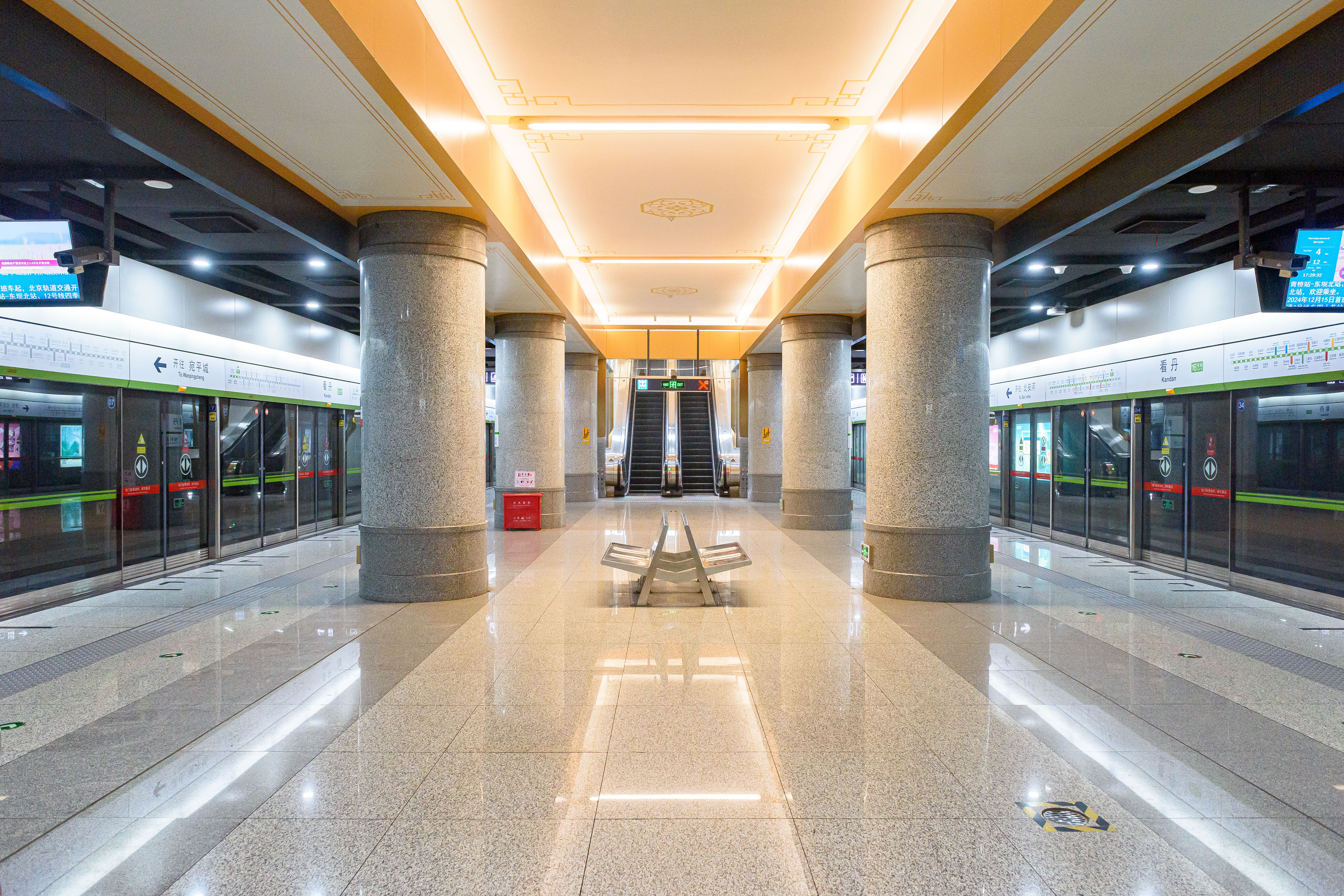
- Platform

General information
- Location: Intersection of Kandan South Rd. and Kanyang Rd., Kandan Subdistrict, Fengtai District, Beijing; China
- Coordinates: 39°50′01″N 116°16′00″E
- Operator: Beijing MTR Metro Line 16 Corp., Ltd.
- Line: Line 16
- Platforms: 2 (1 island platform)
- Tracks: 2

Construction
- Structure type: Underground
- Accessible: Yes

History
- Opened: December 31, 2022; 3 years ago

Services
Preceding station	Beijing Subway	Following station
Fufengqiao towards Bei'anhe	Line 16	Yushuzhuang towards Wanpingcheng
Location

Kandan station (Chinese: 看丹站; pinyin: Kāndān zhàn) is a station on Line 16 of the Beijing Subway. The station opened on 31 December 2022.

== Station layout ==
The station has an underground island platform. There are 3 exits, lettered A, B and C. Exit B is accessible via an elevator.

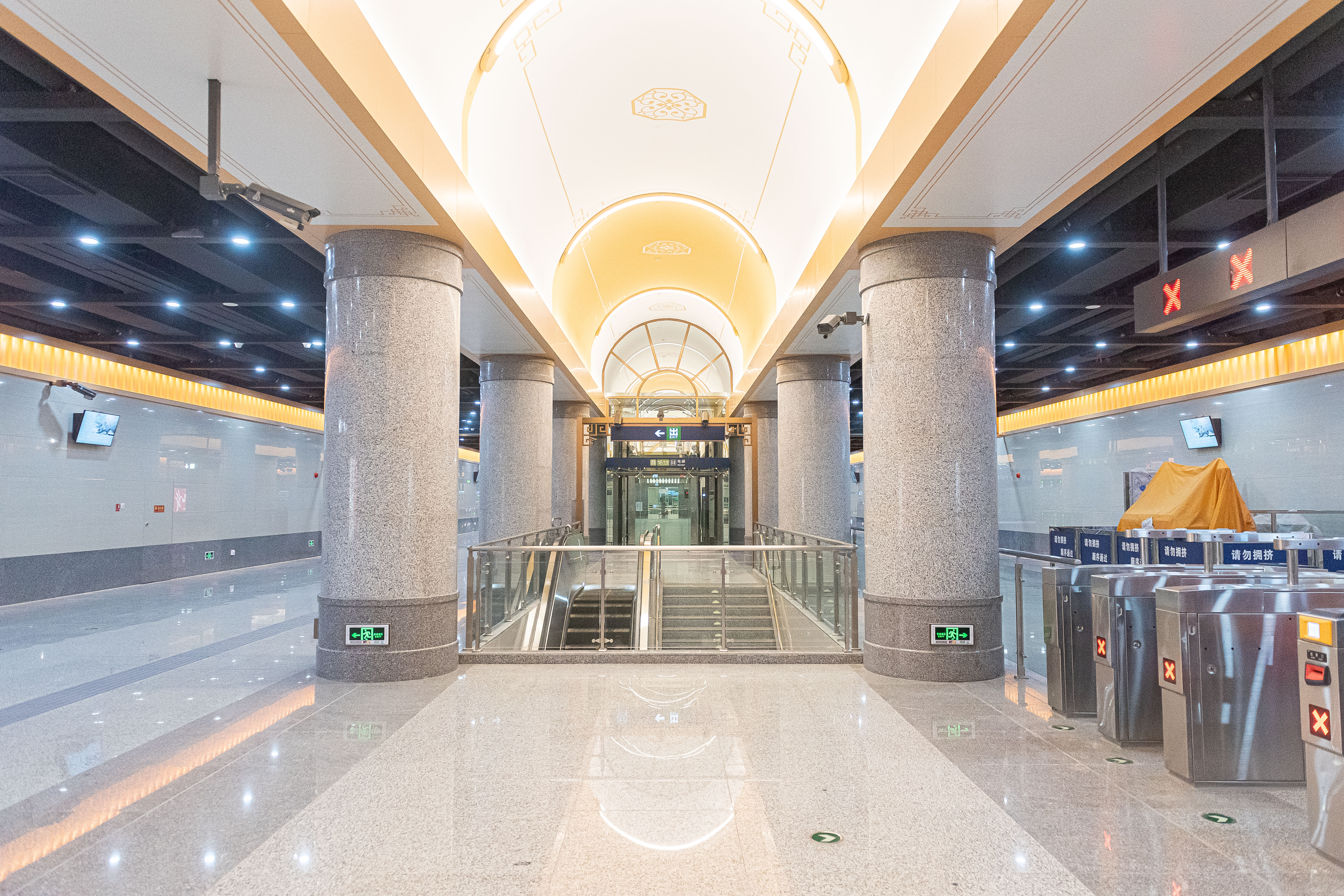
Concourse
