= Jinsong Subdistrict =

Jinsong Subdistrict 劲松街道
- Subdistrict
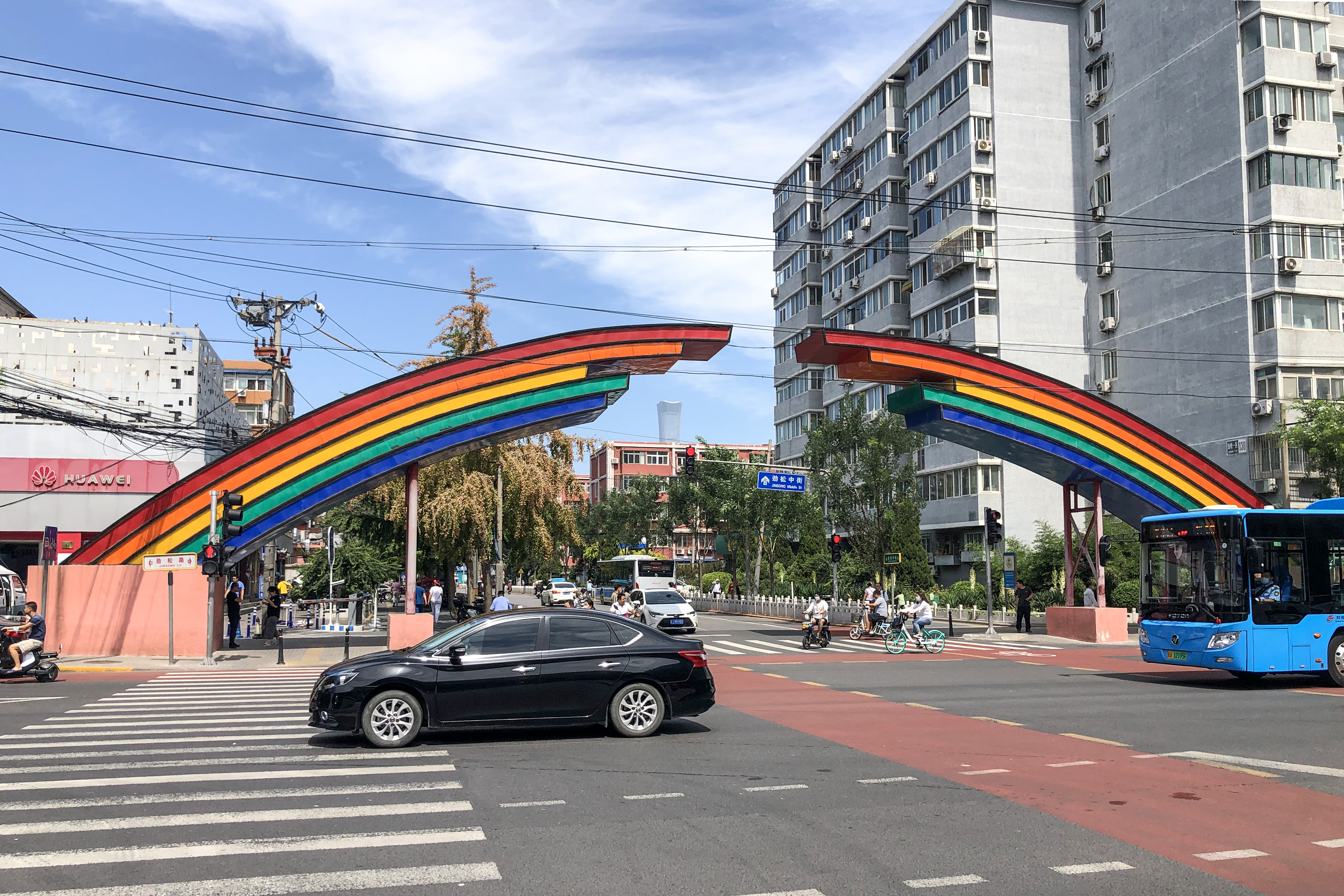
- Intersection of Jinsong Middle Street and Jinsong Road, 2020

- Location within Beijing Location within China
- Coordinates: 39°53′05″N 116°27′31″E
- Country: China
- Municipality: Beijing
- District: Chaoyang
- Village-level Divisions: 17 communities

Area
  - Total: 5.2 km^{2} (2.0 sq mi)

Population (2020)
  - Total: 103,316
  - Density: 20,000/km^{2} (51,000/sq mi)
- Time zone: UTC+8 (China Standard)
- Postal code: 100022
- Area code: 010

Jinsong Subdistrict (Chinese: 劲松街道; pinyin: Jìnsōng Jiēdào) is a subdistrict on the southwest corner of Chaoyang District, Beijing, China. As of 2020, it has a total population of 103,316.

The subdistrict's name Jinsong (Chinese: 劲松; lit. 'Vigorous Pine') was from an old pine tree that used to be in this area.

== History ==
Timeline of changes in the status of Jinsong
Time	Status
1940s	Consist of the following villages: Jiasong; Shixianglu; Laohudong; Bakeyang; Shabanzhuang; Xianxiaopai; Huchengcun; Dajiaoting; Yaowahucun; Tangjiacun; Guanzhuang; Xiaohaizi
1950s	People's Machine Workshop of Beijing and corresponding residential districts for workers were constructed in this area.
1976	Residential Microdistrict was being planned on the western side of the area
1981	Created as Jinsong Subdistrict
1983	Residential Microdistrict was completed, containing 8 subdivisions

== Administrative Division ==
As of 2021, there are 17 communities within Jinsong Subdistrict:

Administrative Division Code	Community Name in English	Community Name in Simplified Chinese
110105017036	Jinsongbei	劲松北
110105017037	Jinsongdong	劲松东
110105017038	Jinsongzhong	劲松中
110105017039	Jinsongxi	劲松西
110105017040	Bakeyang	八棵杨
110105017041	Dajiaoting	大郊亭
110105017042	Nongguangli	农光里
110105017043	Nongguanglizhong	农光里中
110105017044	Nongguangdongli	农光东里
110105017045	Mofangbeili	磨房北里
110105017046	Baihuan	百环
110105017047	Hexieyayuan	和谐雅园
110105017048	Xidawanglu	西大望路
110105017049	Shoucheng	首城
110105017050	Xidawanglunan	西大望路南
110105017051	Baihuandong	百环东
110105017052	Nongguanglinan	农光里南
