= Puyang County =

Puyang County 濮阳县
- County
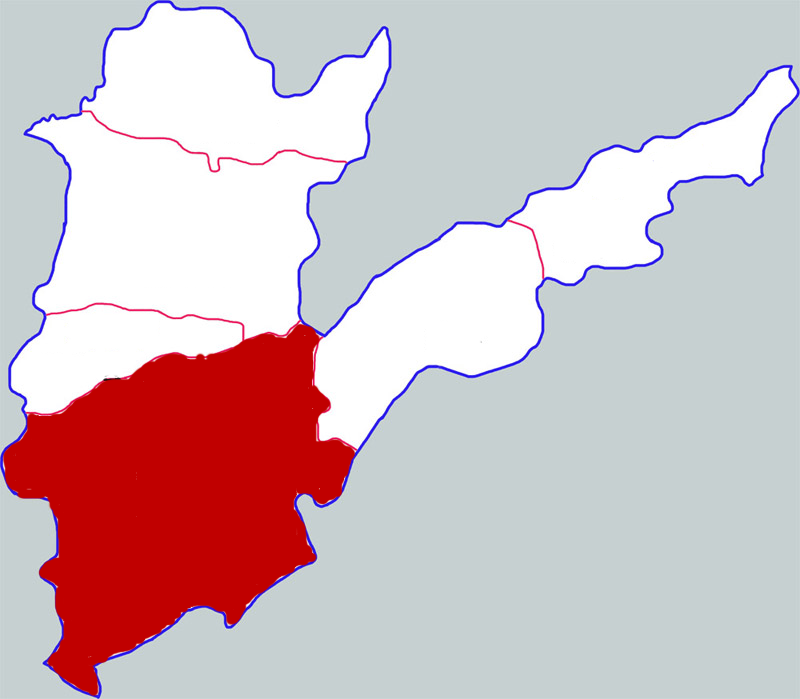
- Location of Puyang County in Puyang City

- Location of the seat in Henan
- Coordinates (Puyang County government): 35°42′47″N 115°01′45″E
- Country: People's Republic of China
- Province: Henan
- Prefecture-level city: Puyang

Area
  - Total: 1,455 km^{2} (562 sq mi)

Population (2019)
  - Total: 980,200
  - Density: 673.7/km^{2} (1,745/sq mi)
- Time zone: UTC+8 (China Standard)
- Postal code: 457100

Puyang County (simplified Chinese: 濮阳县; traditional Chinese: 濮陽縣; pinyin: Púyáng Xiàn) is a county in the northeast of Henan province, China. It is under the administration of the prefecture-level city of Puyang.

== Administrative divisions ==
As of 2012, this county is divided to 8 towns and 12 townships.

Towns

- Chengguan (城关镇)
- Liutun (柳屯镇)
- Wenliu (文留镇)
- Qingzu (庆祖镇)
- Basongqiao (八公桥镇)
- Xuzhen (徐镇镇)
- Hubuzhai (户部寨镇)
- Luhe (鲁河镇)

Townships

- Qinghetou Township (清河头乡)
- Liangzhuang Township (梁庄乡)
- Wangchenggu Township (王称固乡)
- Baigang Township (白堽乡)
- Liyuan Township (梨园乡)
- Wuxing Township (五星乡)
- Zi'an Township (子岸乡)
- Huzhuang Township (胡状乡)
- Langzhong Township (郎中乡)
- Haitong Township (海通乡)
- Qucun Township (渠村乡)
- Diaocheng Township (习城乡)

== Education ==
Puyang County No. 3 Experimental School, as of 2017, had 1,704 students, and 62 teachers. The average class size was 71 students per class. Many parents from rural areas send their children to this school because their local schools had closed. Yuan Suwen and Li Rongde wrote in Caixin that it "is considered one of the few good schools in the area." In March 2017, a stampede occurred at the school, injuring 22 children and killing one.
