= 4th Ring Road =

Controlled-access ring road in Beijing, China

Fourth Ring Road
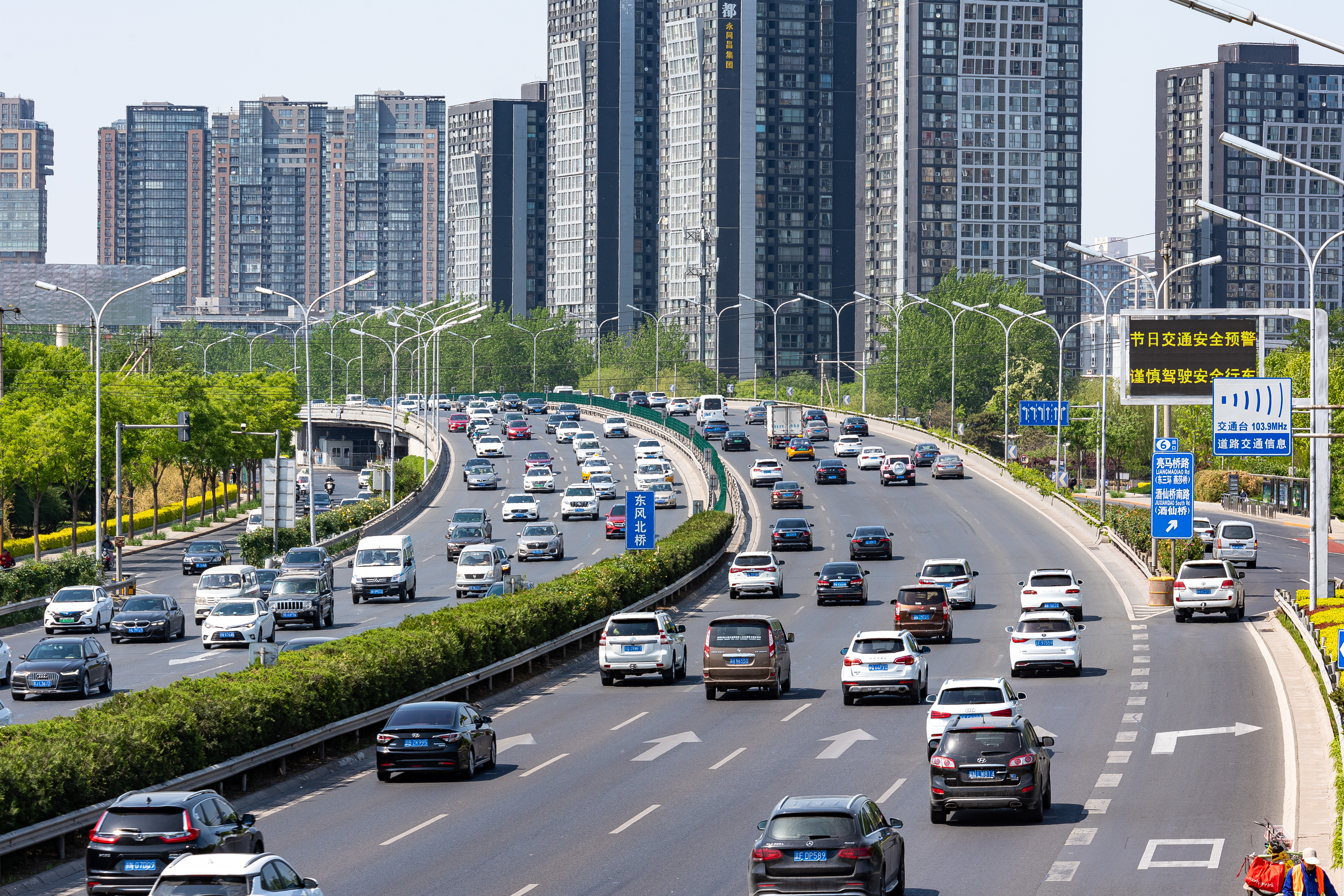
- 4th Ring Road in May 2021

Route information
- Length: 65.3 km (40.6 mi)
- Existed: June 2001–present

Major junctions
- Airport Expressway; G1 Beijing-Harbin Expressway; G2 Beijing-Shanghai Expressway; G3 Beijing-Taipei Expressway; G4 Beijing-Hong Kong and Macau Expressway; G6 Beijing-Lhasa Expressway; G45 Daqing–Guangzhou Expressway

Location
- Country: China

Highway system
- Transport in China

The 4th Ring Road (Chinese: 四环路; pinyin: Sìhuánlù) is a controlled-access expressway ring road in Beijing, China which runs around the city, with a radius of approximately 8 kilometres (5.0 mi) from city centre. The total length of the road is 65.3 kilometres (40.6 mi). There are 147 bridges and viaducts that run the length of the Ring Road.

The first section, a short stretch of the northern corridor, was completed in preparation for the 1990 Asian Games. The Ring Road was 'enclosed' in a full circle in June 2001, with standard controlled-access expressway throughout.

== Route ==
The 4th Ring Road is entirely within the city limit of Beijing, and while it is called a ring, the road is shaped rectangularly.

The route travels past: Siyuan Bridge - Chaoyang Park Area - Sihui - Sifang Bridge - Shibalidian - Dahongmen - Majialou - Yuegezhuang Bridge - Fengtai Area - Sijiqing Area - Zhongguancun Area - Jianxiang - Asian Games Village Area - Wanghe Bridge - Siyuan Bridge

== History ==
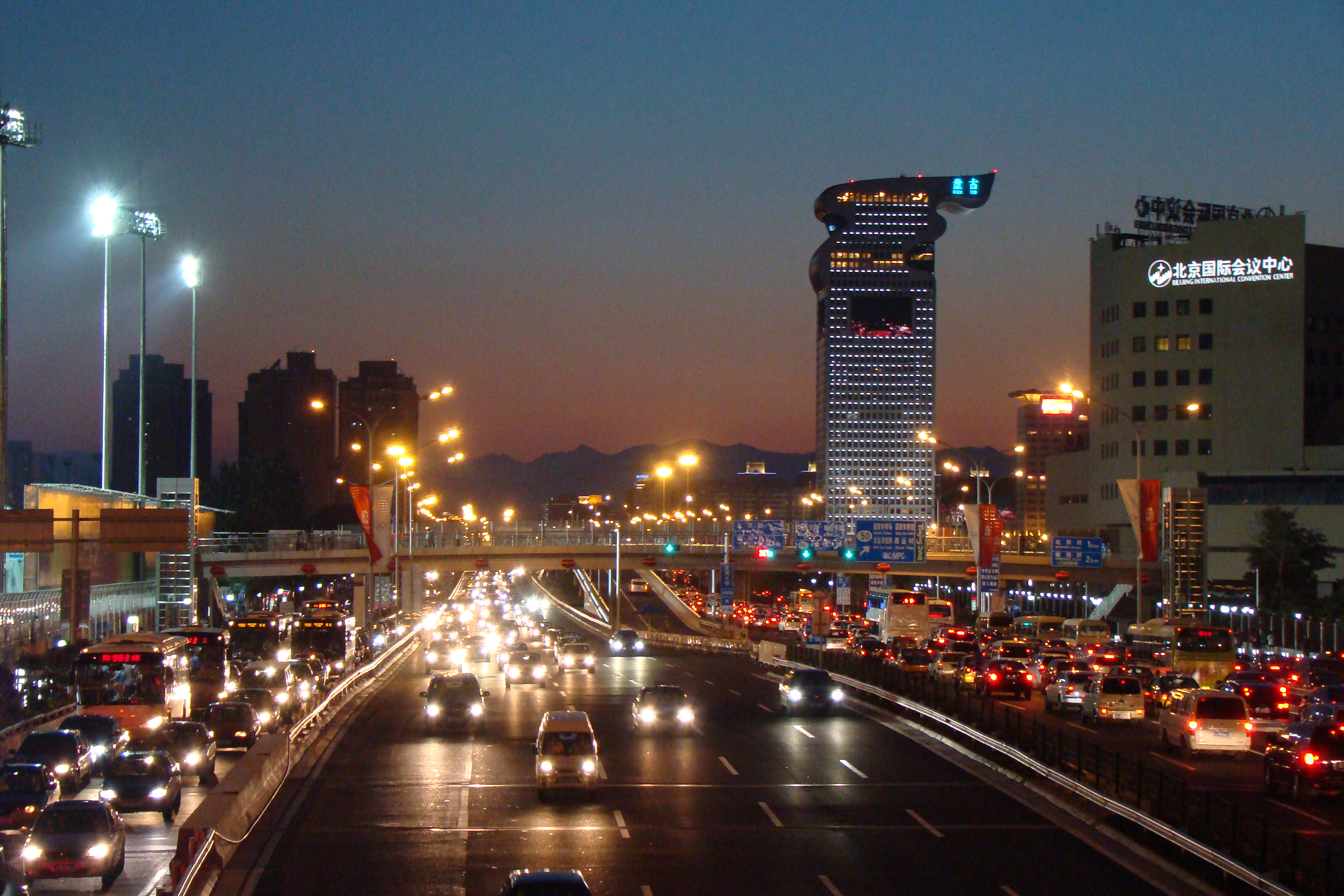
4th Ring Road in February 2007 with the Pangu Plaza visible in the background

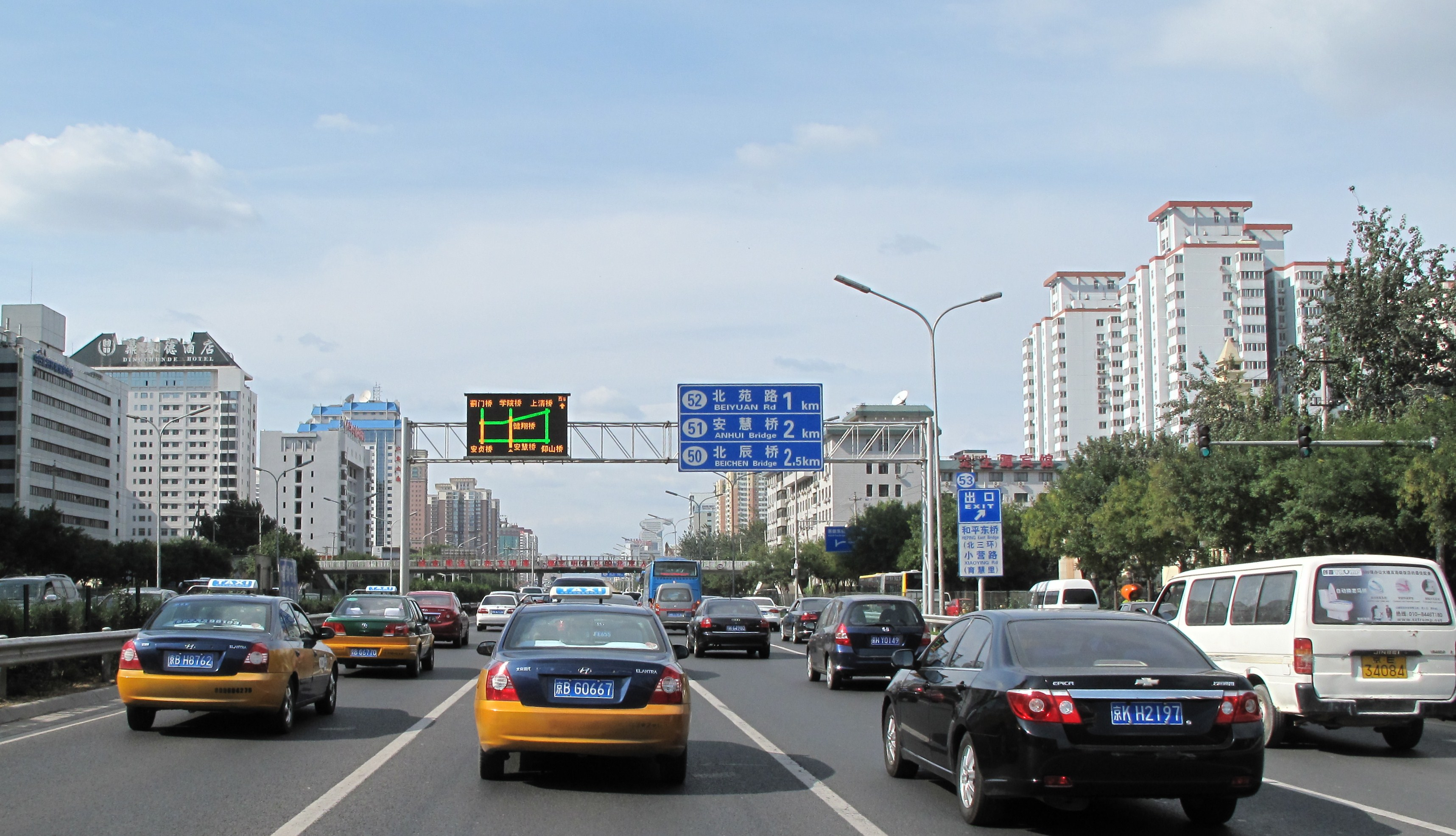
4th Ring Road in 2011

In the early 1990s, the northern stretch of the 4th Ring Road from Zhongguancun to Siyuan Bridge existed as a ring road, albeit with far narrower road conditions and with traffic lights. Only three flyover viaducts—those at Jianxiang Bridge, Anhui Bridge and Siyuan Bridge—existed.

To commemorate the 50th anniversary of the People's Republic of China, the eastern stretch of the 4th Ring Road was opened from Siyuan Bridge to Shibalidian around October 1, 1999. This was the first part of the ring road to be opened as an 8-lane expressway (4 lanes per direction, not including an emergency belt).

The northern part of the 4th Ring Road from Jianxiang Bridge to Siyuan Bridge was converted to an 8-lane expressway in late September 2000. Later that year, the southern part from Shibalidian through to Fengtai opened to traffic, as was the case with the northwestern part.

By June 2001, the entire 4th Ring Road had been converted into an expressway-standard thoroughfare.

In early 2004, the speed limit was reduced to a unified 80 km/h (minimum speed limit: 50 km/h).

In September 2004, the 4th Ring Road underwent a massive sign change. Exit numberings were unified at last—bidirectionally (this was previously not the case).

A new overpass in the northern stretch was put into operation in October 2004, near the Beichen area.

== Road conditions ==
=== Speed limit ===
Previously: first lane, min. 80 km/h, max. 100 km/h; second lane, min. 70 km/h, max. 90 km/h; third lane, min. 60 km/h, max. 80 km/h; fourth lane, min. 50 km/h, max. 80 km/h; auxiliary road, uniform max. speed limit of 70 km/h. Readjusted in 2004 so that all lanes have a uniform min. speed limit of 50 km/h and a max. speed limit of 80 km/h; aux. road max. speed limit of 70 km/h remains unchanged.

=== Tolls ===
This express road does not charge tolls.

=== Lanes ===
8 lanes (4 in each direction) throughout.

=== Traffic conditions ===
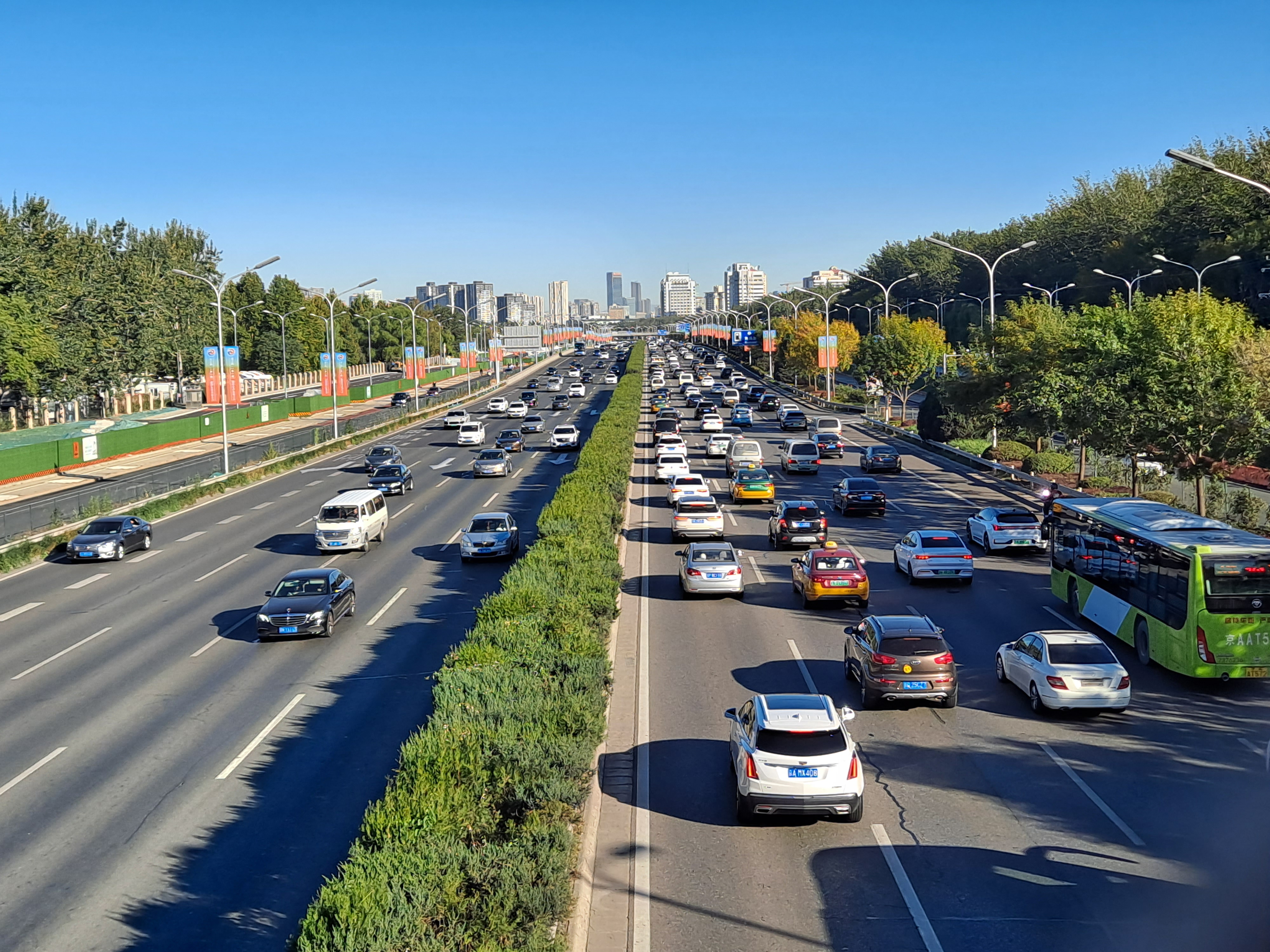
4th Ring Road in 2023

The portion from Jianxiang to Siyuan Bridge, in both directions, is especially vulnerable to horrible traffic jams. The remainder of the northern and eastern portions are also vulnerable. Apart from the Fengtai area, the remainder of the 4th Ring Road has a lesser risk of being clogged up by traffic jams.

== Major exits ==
Siyuan Bridge, Sihui, Sifang Bridge, Shibalidian, Majialou, Fengtai, Yuegezhuang, Zhongguancun, Jianxiang Bridge, Wanghe Bridge.

== Service areas ==
No full-scale service areas exist; however, filling stations (gas stations) are plentiful in number.

== Connections ==
Badaling Expressway: Connects to the Badaling Expressway at Jianxiang Bridge.

Jingcheng Expressway: Connects to the Jingcheng Expressway at Wanghe Bridge (for the time being, only heading for Laiguangying and Chengde).

Airport Expressway: Connects to the Airport Expressway at Siyuan Bridge (only heading for the airport).

Projected Jingping Expressway: Would most likely connect at Dongfeng North Bridge.

Jingtong Expressway: Connects to the Jingtong Expressway at Sihui.

Jingshen Expressway: Connects to the Jingshen Expressway at Sifang Bridge (only heading for Shenyang).

Jingjintang Expressway: Connects to the Jingjintang Expressway at Shibalidian.

Jingkai Expressway: Connects to the Jingkai Expressway at Majialou.

Jingshi Expressway: Connects to the Jingshi Expressway at Yuegezhuang.

== Signs ==
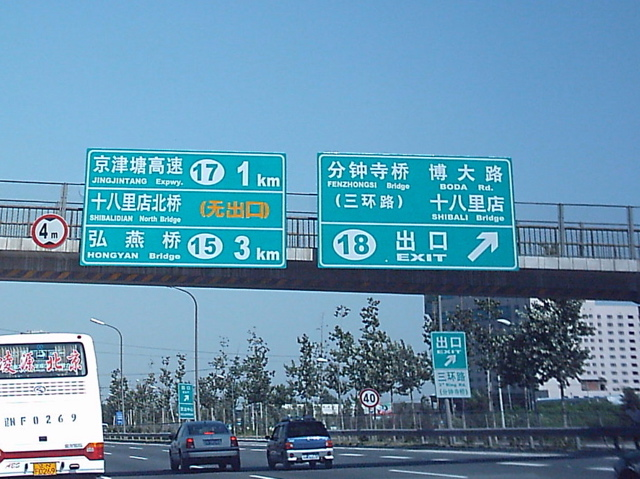
New signs on 4th Ring Road in September 2004

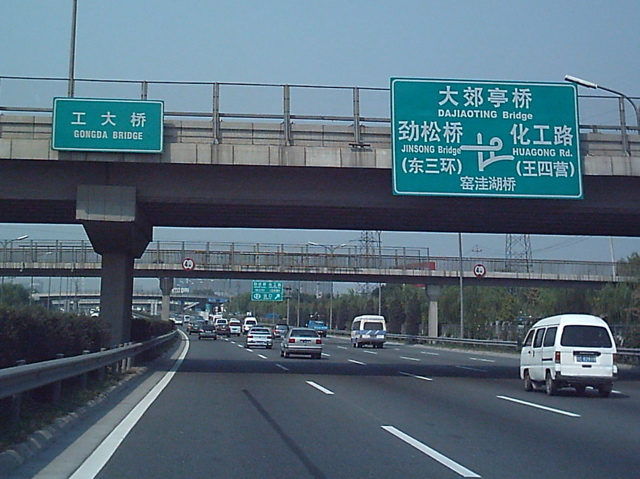
The highway in September 2004

When it was opened by 2001, the 4th Ring Road's signs were plagued by inconsistency. Mixing of Hanyu Pinyin and English on the signs confused drivers, but what was most confusing was the exit numbering. It so happened that the same exit had two different exit numbers—one for each direction of the ring road.

Beijing authorities had three years' lapse before they dealt with the problem. Old signs were progressively replaced by newer signs which had standardised English and, finally, a new exit numbering system was in place. A sketch map of each exit, formerly only for expressways and isolated spots, was also introduced along with the new sign numbering.

Another change was the use of traffic sign language to signal traffic regulations instead of relying completely on Chinese Hanzi. Some bridge names (e.g. Sihe Bridge) are also getting a name change at the same time.

The project was somewhat Herculean since 441 signs were to be replaced. Of those, exit and entrance signs formed 202 signs; other, mainly larger-sized signs, formed the remaining 239 signs. Earlier in the summer of 2004, similar measures for the 5th Ring Road (which had an absent-to-chaotic exit numbering system) were announced.

In a show of speed, within the first 100 hours, new exit numberings were put up for almost all of the western stretch of the 4th Ring Road (despite new/old signs being alternated on a different stretch of the ring road).

Reaction to the new signs are mixed. There is a definitive plus side: the exits are now matched with their equivalent exit/bridge names on the 3rd and 5th ring roads. Unfortunately, many complain of an information overkill. Signs are now complex enough to hold five different directions (on some bridges). Meanwhile, the mixing of lowercase and uppercase English in small font sizes is another concern.

On both the 4th Ring Road and the 5th Ring Road, some speed cameras were put into place, along with the general sign changes.

== List of exits ==
[Heading in a clockwise direction as of the Northern 4th Ring Road—please note, Exit No. 1 begins at Wanghe Bridge]

Notes:

- Exits present only in a clockwise direction are indicated by the symbol ↩; anticlockwise only, ↪; not yet open, ✕
- Exit sign symbols: ↗ = exit, ⇆ = interchange with an expressway or China National Highway;

=== North 4th Ring Road ===
- ↗ 43: Summer Palace, Landianchang North Road (Huoqiying Bridge)
- ↗ 44: Wanquanhe Road, Suzhou Bridge
- ↗ 45: Haidian Bridge
- ↗ 46: Zhongguancun, Sitong Bridge
- ↗ 47: Xueyuan Road, Jimen Bridge (Xueyuan Bridge)
- ↗ 48: Zhixin East Street, Beitaiping Bridge (Zhixin Bridge)
- ⇆ 49: (Interchange with Badaling Expressway) Badaling Expressway (Jianxiang Bridge)
  - ⇆ 49A: Madian Bridge
  - ⇆ 49B: Badaling Expressway (Changping)
  - ↗ 49C: Beichen West Road (max. height 3.5 m)
- ↗ 50: Beichen Road, Beichen East Road, Beichen West Road (Beichen Bridge)
- ↗ 51: Anzhen Bridge, Anli Road (Anhui Bridge)
- ↗ 52: Beiyuan Road, Lishuiqiao
- ↗ 53: Heping East Bridge, Xiaoying Road (Huixin East Bridge)
- ↗ (↩) Yuhui South Street
- ⇆ 1: (Interchange with Jingcheng Expressway) Jingcheng Expressway (Wanghe Bridge)
  - ⇆ 1A: 3rd Ring Road ✕
  - ⇆ 1B: N. 5th Ring Road, Shunyi
- ↗ (↪) Jiangzhuanghu
- ↗ 2: Wangjing West Road
- ↗ 3: ✕
- ⇆ 4: (Interchange with the Airport Expressway and China National Highway 101) (Siyuan Bridge)
  - ⇆ 4A: Sanyuan Bridge, (↩) Xiaoyun Road
  - ⇆ 4B: Jingshun Road (Shunyi)
  - ⇆ 4C: Airport Expressway

=== East 4th Ring Road ===
- ↗ 5: (↪) Sanyuan East Bridge, Dashanzi (Xiaoyun Bridge)
- ↗ 6: Yansha Bridge, Jiuxianqiao (Dongfeng North Bridge)
- ↗ 7: Yaojiayuan Road, Changhong Bridge (Chaoyuangongyuan Bridge)
- ↗ 8: Changhong Bridge, Chaoyang Park, Yaojiayuan Road, Chaoyang North Road (Honglingjin Bridge)
- ↗ 9: ✕
- ⇆ 10: (Interchange with Jingtong Expressway) Guomao Bridge, Jingtong Expressway (Sihui Bridge)
- ↗ 11: Shuangjing Bridge, Guangqu Road (Dajiaoting Bridge)
- ↗ 12: Jinsong Bridge, Huagong Road (Yaowahu Bridge)
- ↗ 13: Gongda Bridge
- ⇆ 14: (Interchange with Jingshen Expressway) Jingshen Expressway (bound for 5th Ring Road and Beidaihe)
- ↗ 15: Hongyan Road, Fatou (Hongyan Bridge)
- ↗ 16: (↪) Shibalidian North Bridge
- ⇆ 17: (Interchange with Jingjintang Expressway) Jingjintang Expressway (bound for 5th Ring Road, Tianjin) (Shibalidian Bridge)

=== South 4th Ring Road ===
- ↗ 18: Fenzhongsi Bridge, Boda Rd, Shibalidian (Shibalidian South Bridge)
- ↗ 19: (↩) Longzhuashu (Xiaohongmen Bridge)
- ↗ 20: Chengshousi, Yizhuang (Xiaocun Bridge)
- ↗ 21: (↩) Dahongmen / (↪) Xiaohongmen (Liuxiang Bridge)
- ↗ 22: (↪) Dahongmen, Jiugong (Dahongmen East Bridge)
- ⇆ 23: (Interchange with China National Highway 104) Nanyuan Road (G104), Muxiyuan Bridge, Nanyuan Airport (Dahongmen Bridge)
- ↗ 24: Wanfang Bridge, Majiapu Road (Gongyi Bridge)
- ↗ 25: Caoqiao
- ⇆ 26: (Interchange with Jingkai Expressway) Jingkai Expressway (Majialou Bridge)
- ↗ 27: Xinfadi
- ↗ 28: Huaxiang (Sihe Bridge)

=== West 4th Ring Road ===
- ↗ 29: Baiqiang Ave, Beijing World Park, Sci-Tech Park (Kandan Bridge)
- ↗ 30: Fengtai S Rd, Fufeng Rd, Kexing Rd (Kefeng Bridge)
- ↗ 31: Fengtai Town
- ↗ 32: (Interchange with Jingshi Expressway) Jingshi Expressway (headed for Fangshan) (road link under construction) (Fengbei Bridge)
- ⇆ 33: (Interchange with Jingshi Expressway) Jingshi Expressway (headed for Fangshan) (Yuegezhuang Bridge)
- ↗ 34: Liuli Bridge, Zhengchangzhuang
- ↗ 35: (Wukesong Bridge)
- ↗ 36: (↩) Yongding Rd, Xicui Rd
- ↗ 37: Fushi Road, Hangtian Bridge (Dinghui Bridge)
- ↗ 38: Wuluju
- ↗ 39: Xingshikou Bridge, Eight Great Sites, Zizhu Bridge (Sijiqing Bridge)
- ↗ 40: (↩) Yuanda Road
- ↗ 41: Xijiao Airport, Landianchang (Nanwu Bridge)
- ↗ 42: Fragrant Hills, Jade Spring Hills (Sihai Bridge)
