= Siyuan Bridge =

Bridge in Beijing

Coordinates: 39.9725°N 116.4696°E

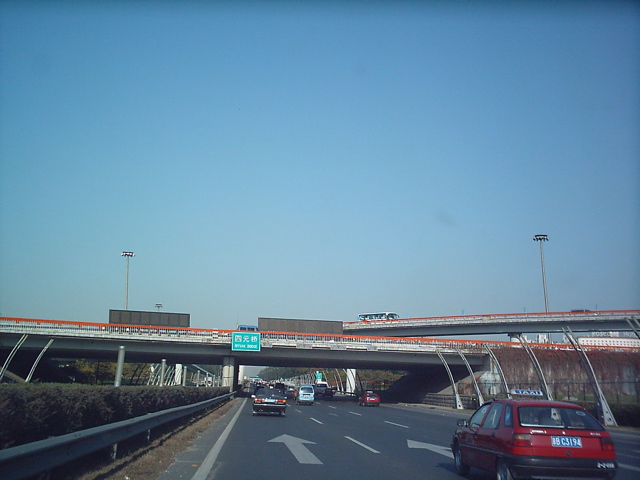
Siyuan Bridge as seen from the Airport Expressway.

Siyuan Bridge (simplified Chinese: 四元桥; traditional Chinese: 四元橋; pinyin: Sìyuán Qiáo), also known as Siyuan Overpass, is a highway overpass in northeastern Beijing, China.

Similar to Wuyuan Bridge further north and Sanyuan Bridge further south, it links three roads instead of just two for a normal overpass. The Airport Expressway, China National Highway 101, and the 4th Ring Road are linked.

Siyuan Bridge is extremely complex. Approaching east (coming in from the west), one faces two exits within a few metres of each other, and the second exit splits into two on the bridge. Half a kilometre away lies yet another exit. The exits for the portion coming in from the east are even more complex (three separate exits), and there is no entrance into the Airport Expressway heading south. Odder still, drivers heading for Beijing Capital International Airport can only enter the 4th Ring Road heading west, but those coming into central Beijing can pick both directions.
