= Qingfeng County =

Qingfeng County 清丰县
- County
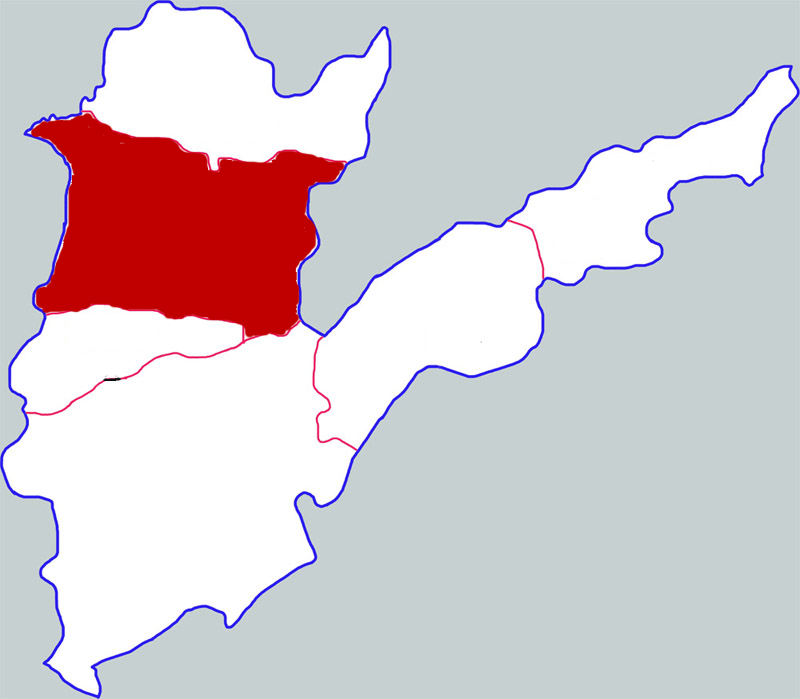
- Qingfeng in Puyang

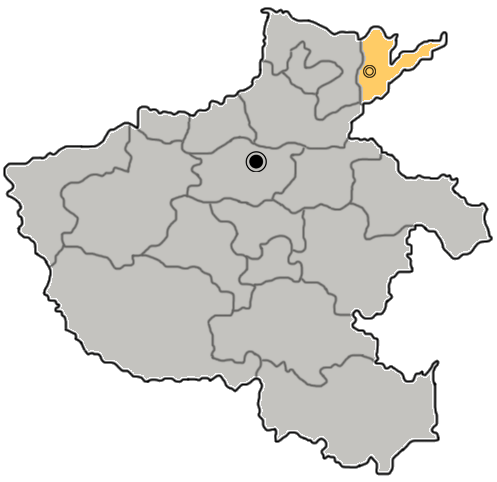
- Puyang in Henan
- Coordinates: 35°53′06″N 115°06′14″E
- Country: People's Republic of China
- Province: Henan
- Prefecture-level city: Puyang

Area
  - Total: 869 km^{2} (336 sq mi)

Population (2019)
  - Total: 628,400
  - Density: 723/km^{2} (1,870/sq mi)
- Time zone: UTC+8 (China Standard)
- Postal code: 457300

Qingfeng County
- Traditional Chinese: 清豐縣
- Simplified Chinese: 清丰县
Transcriptions
Standard Mandarin
- Hanyu Pinyin: Qīngfēng Xiàn

Qingfeng County is a county located in the northeast of Henan province, bordering the provinces of Hebei to the northwest and Shandong to the east. It is under the administration of the prefecture-level city of Puyang. In the Han dynasty, Dunqiu County (simplified Chinese: 顿丘; traditional Chinese: 頓丘) was located somewhere near this area, possibly to the southwest of the modern day county. At the time, it was a part of Dong Commandery (simplified Chinese: 东郡; traditional Chinese: 東郡). Cao Cao was made governor of Dunqiu County, following his assignment as Captain of the Northern District (北都尉) of Luoyang (the capital at that time).

== Administrative divisions ==
As of 2012, this county is divided to 5 towns and 12 townships.

Towns

- Chengguan (城关镇)
- Mazhuangqiao (马庄桥镇)
- Wawutou (瓦屋头镇)
- Xianzhuang (仙庄镇)
- Liuge (柳格镇)

Townships

- Liuta Township (六塔乡)
- Gongying Township (巩营乡)
- Macun Township (马村乡)
- Gaobao Township (高堡乡)
- Gucheng Township (古城乡)
- Daliu Township (大流乡)
- Hancun Township (韩村乡)
- Datun Township (大屯乡)
- Gucheng Township (固城乡)
- Shuangmiao Township (双庙乡)
- Zhifang Township (纸房乡)
- Yangshao Township (阳邵乡)

== Climate ==
Climate data for Qingfeng, elevation 49 m (161 ft), (1991–2020 normals, extremes 1981–2010)
Month	Jan	Feb	Mar	Apr	May	Jun	Jul	Aug	Sep	Oct	Nov	Dec	Year
Record high °C (°F)	17.0 (62.6)	24.6 (76.3)	27.6 (81.7)	33.8 (92.8)	37.1 (98.8)	41.6 (106.9)	41.1 (106.0)	36.7 (98.1)	36.9 (98.4)	35.3 (95.5)	27.5 (81.5)	22.5 (72.5)	41.6 (106.9)
Mean daily maximum °C (°F)	4.3 (39.7)	8.5 (47.3)	14.7 (58.5)	21.0 (69.8)	26.6 (79.9)	32.2 (90.0)	32.0 (89.6)	30.4 (86.7)	27.1 (80.8)	21.5 (70.7)	12.9 (55.2)	6.0 (42.8)	19.8 (67.6)
Daily mean °C (°F)	−1.5 (29.3)	2.2 (36.0)	8.3 (46.9)	14.6 (58.3)	20.3 (68.5)	25.7 (78.3)	27.0 (80.6)	25.4 (77.7)	20.7 (69.3)	14.8 (58.6)	6.8 (44.2)	0.4 (32.7)	13.7 (56.7)
Mean daily minimum °C (°F)	−5.8 (21.6)	−2.5 (27.5)	2.9 (37.2)	8.7 (47.7)	14.3 (57.7)	19.8 (67.6)	23.0 (73.4)	21.6 (70.9)	15.9 (60.6)	9.6 (49.3)	2.1 (35.8)	−3.8 (25.2)	8.8 (47.9)
Record low °C (°F)	−20.0 (−4.0)	−18.9 (−2.0)	−7.8 (18.0)	−3.5 (25.7)	2.9 (37.2)	9.6 (49.3)	16.0 (60.8)	11.0 (51.8)	2.6 (36.7)	−2.6 (27.3)	−20.2 (−4.4)	−17.5 (0.5)	−20.2 (−4.4)
Average precipitation mm (inches)	5.4 (0.21)	9.6 (0.38)	13.1 (0.52)	28.8 (1.13)	44.8 (1.76)	62.1 (2.44)	154.9 (6.10)	117.7 (4.63)	56.7 (2.23)	29.7 (1.17)	22.0 (0.87)	6.5 (0.26)	551.3 (21.7)
Average precipitation days (≥ 0.1 mm)	2.7	3.4	3.3	5.0	6.2	7.5	10.9	8.9	6.9	5.1	4.4	2.7	67
Average snowy days	3.1	2.8	0.7	0.3	0	0	0	0	0	0	1.1	2.3	10.3
Average relative humidity (%)	66	63	62	67	69	63	79	83	78	70	71	69	70
Mean monthly sunshine hours	125.1	136.7	184.5	209.4	231.3	211.8	175.8	176.1	166.8	165.6	140.0	128.8	2,051.9
Percentage possible sunshine	40	44	49	53	53	49	40	42	45	48	46	43	46
Source: China Meteorological Administration
