= Hualong, Puyang =

Hualong 华龙区
- District
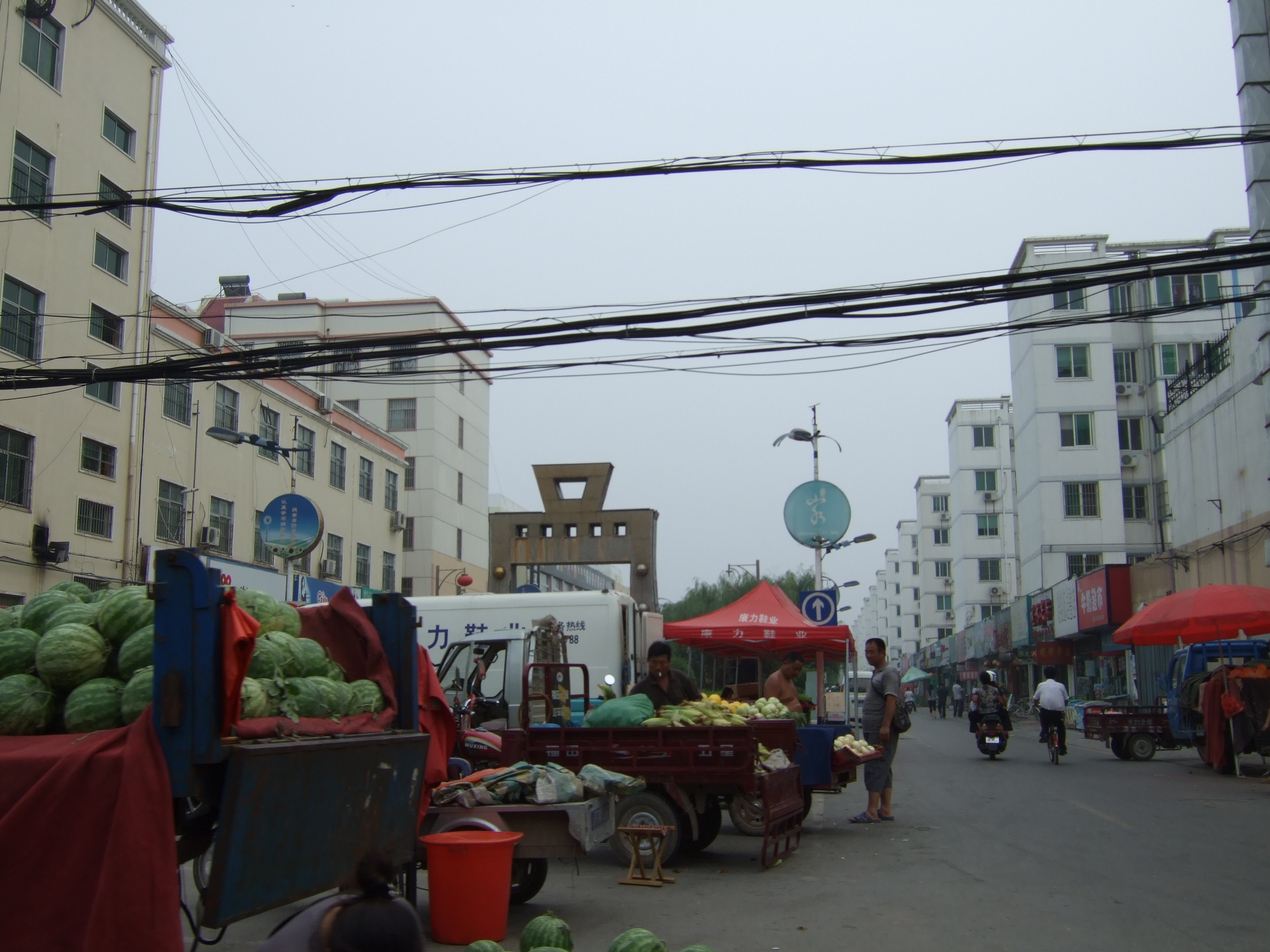

- Location in Henan
- Coordinates: 35°46′42″N 115°04′28″E
- Country: People's Republic of China
- Province: Henan
- Prefecture-level city: Puyang

Area
  - Total: 255 km^{2} (98 sq mi)

Population (2019)
  - Total: 760,300
  - Density: 2,980/km^{2} (7,720/sq mi)
- Time zone: UTC+8 (China Standard)
- Postal code: 457001

Hualong District (simplified Chinese: 华龙区; traditional Chinese: 華龍區; pinyin: Huàlóng Qū) is a district of city of Puyang, Henan province, China.

== Administrative divisions ==
As of 2012, this district is divided to 10 subdistricts, 5 townships and 2 others.

Subdistricts

- Zhongyuanlu Subdistrict (中原路街道)
- Shenglilu Subdistrict (利路街道)
- Jianshelu Subdistrict (建设路街道)
- Renminlu Subdistrict (人民路街道)
- Daqinglu Subdistrict (大庆路街道)
- Huanghelu Subdistrict (黄河路街道)
- Renqiulu Subdistrict (任丘路街道)
- Kunwulu Subdistrict (昆吾路街道)
- Huangfulu Subdistrict (皇甫路街道)
- Zhongyuanyoutian Subdistrict (中原油田街道)

Townships

- Yuecun Township (岳村乡)
- Mengke Township (孟轲乡)
- Hucun Township (胡村乡)
- Wangzhu Township (王助乡)
- Xindiao Township (新习乡)

Others

- Puyang Development Zone (濮阳市开发区)
- Baitiaohe Farm (白条河农场)
