= Puyang =

Puyang 濮阳市
- Prefecture-level city
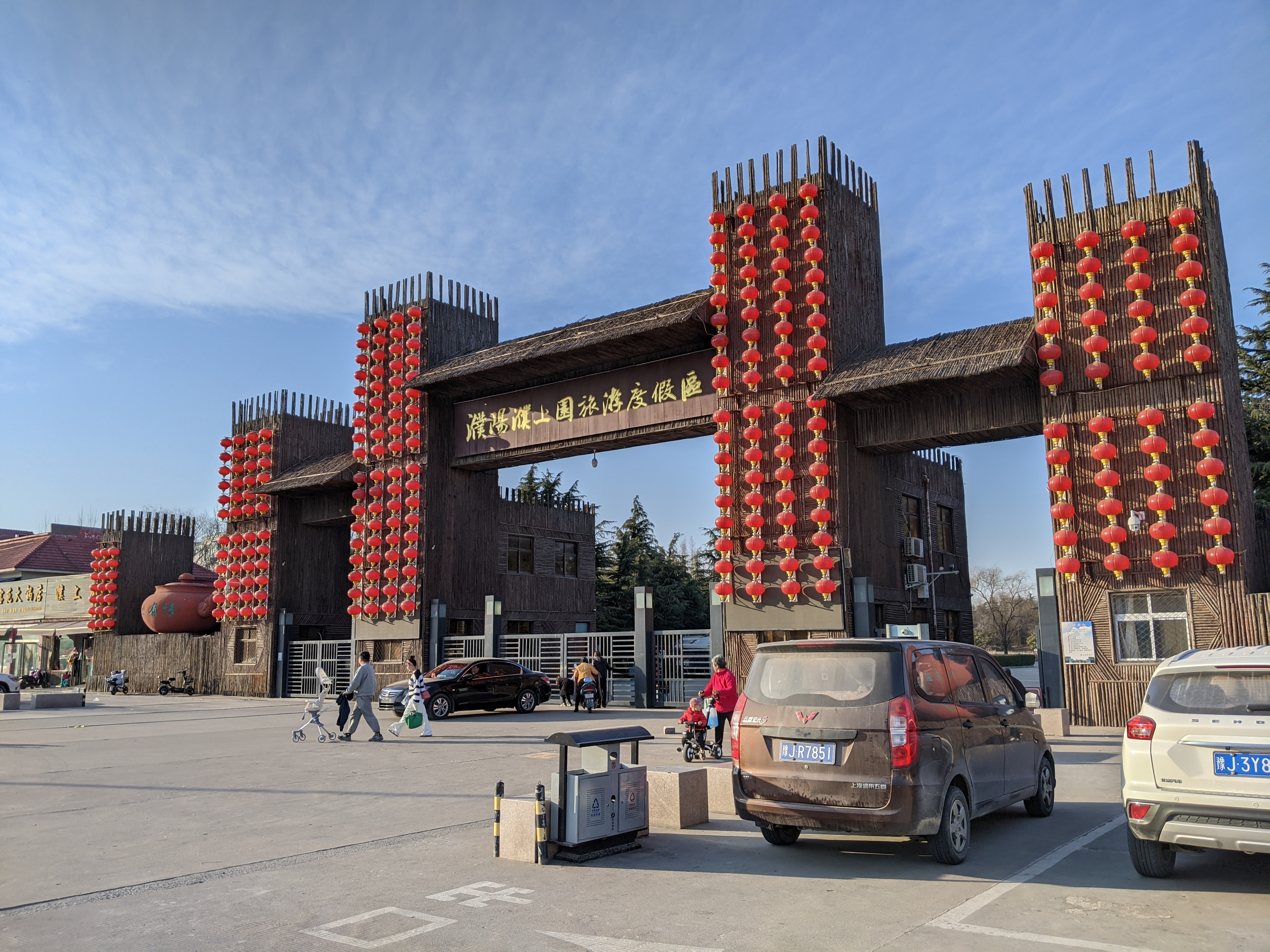
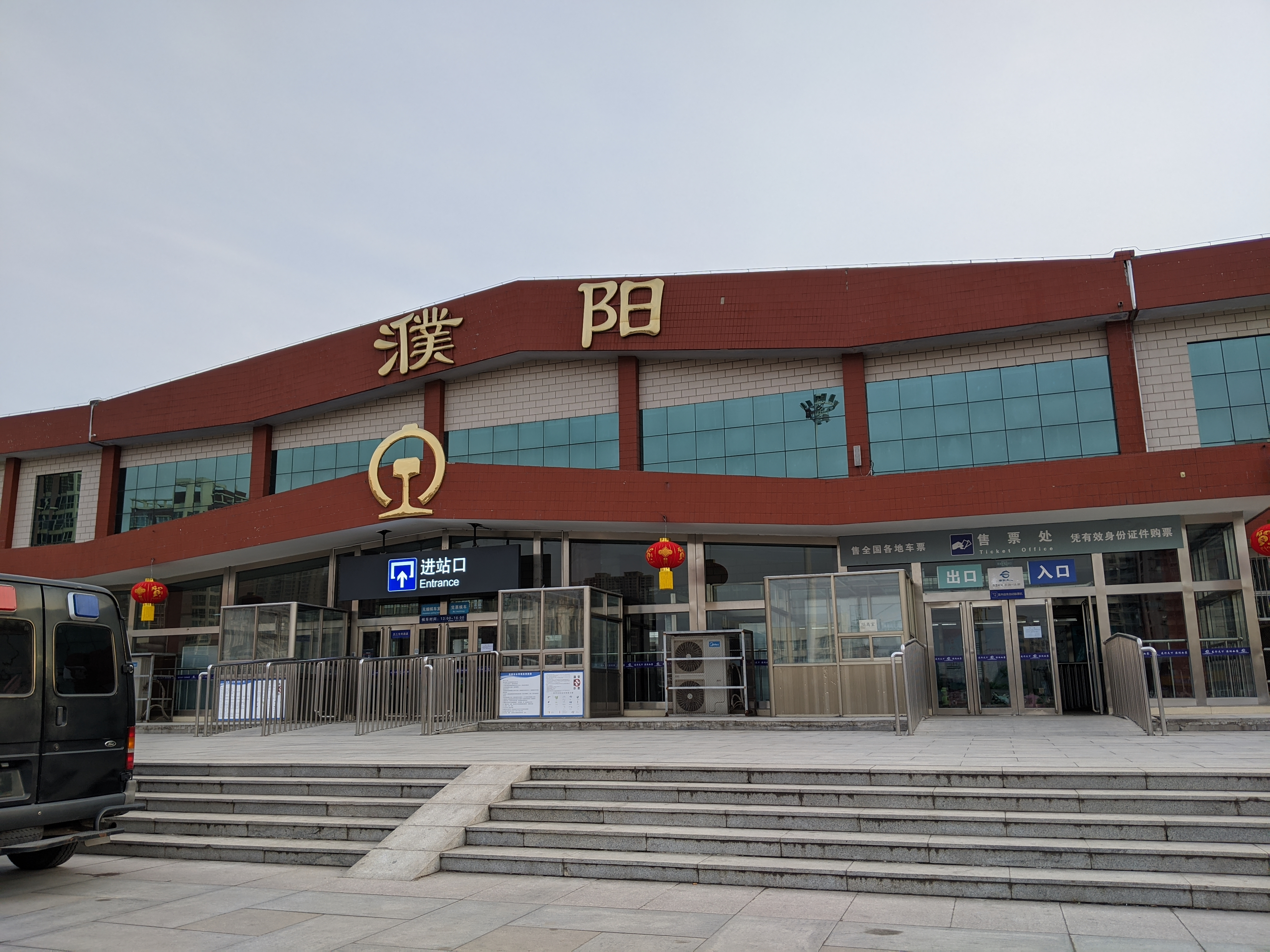
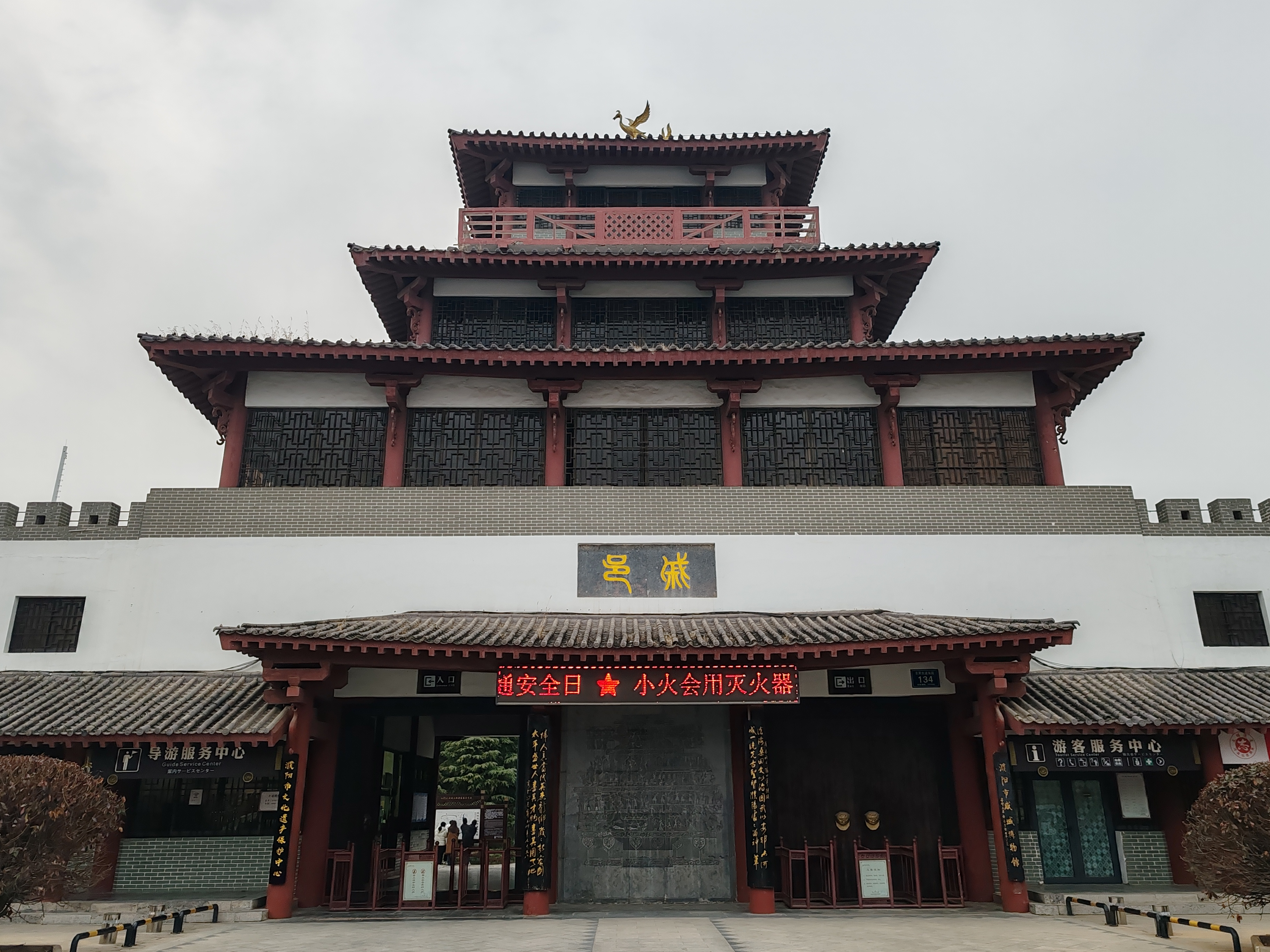
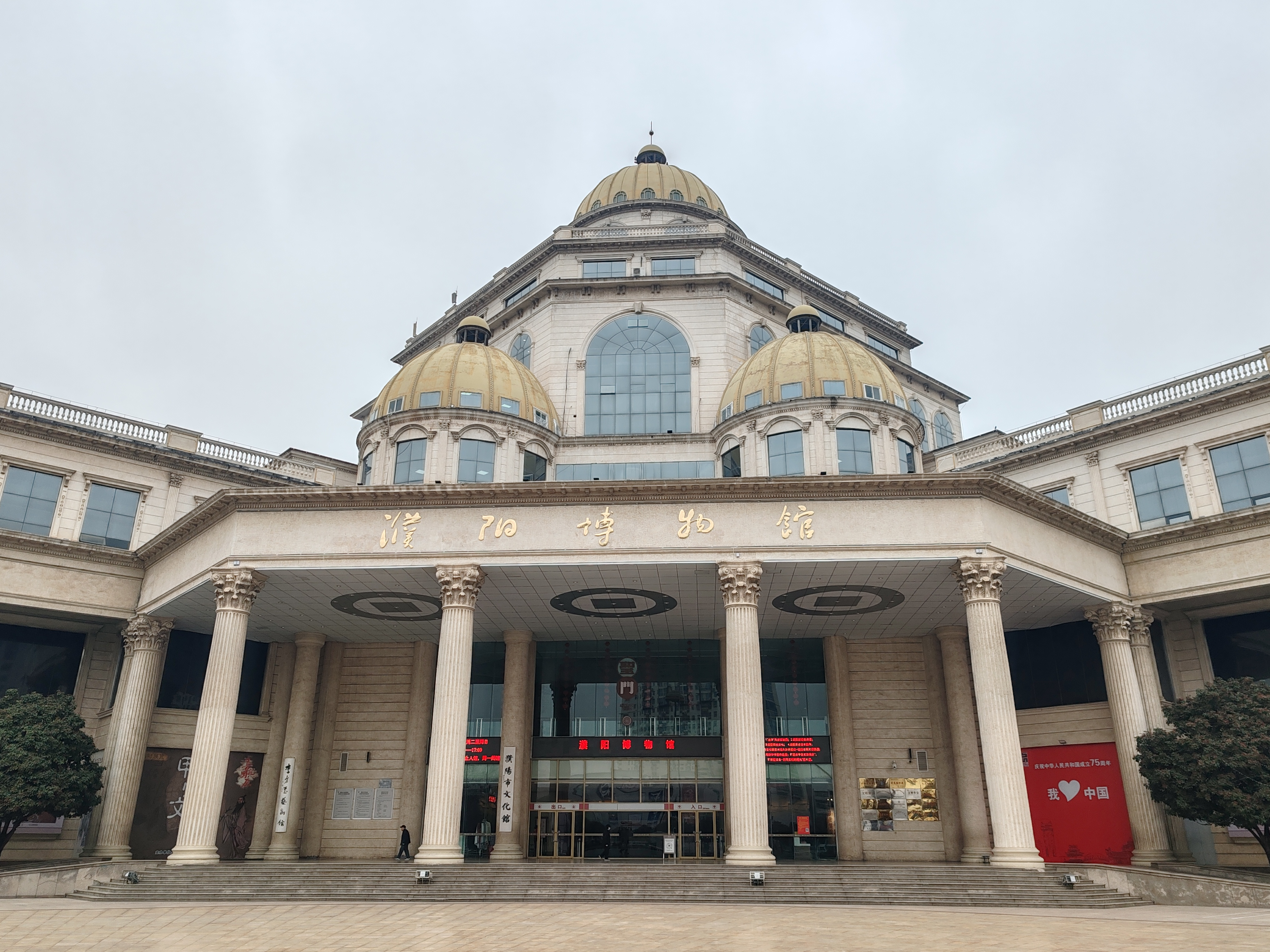
- Puyang Pushangyuan Tourist Resort Puyang Railway Station Historic Qi City Puyang Museum

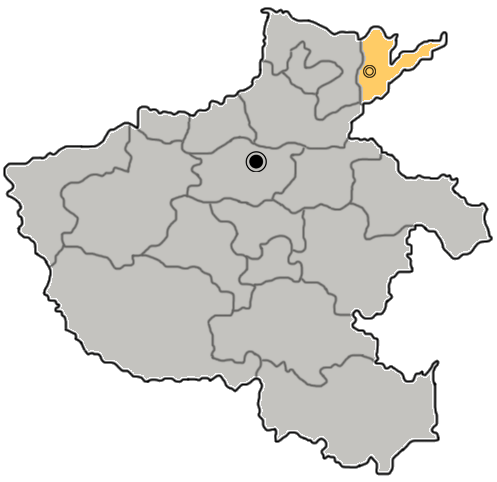
- Puyang in Henan

- Location on the North China Plain Puyang (China)
- Coordinates (Puyang municipal government): 35°45′46″N 115°01′45″E
- Country: People's Republic of China
- Province: Henan
- Municipal seat: Hualong District

Government
  - Party Secretary: He Xiong (何雄)
  - Mayor: Zhao Ruidong (赵瑞东)

Area
  - Prefecture-level city: 4,188 km^{2} (1,617 sq mi)
  - Urban: 310 km^{2} (120 sq mi)
  - Metro: 2,520 km^{2} (970 sq mi)

Population (2020 census)
  - Prefecture-level city: 3,772,088
  - Density: 900.7/km^{2} (2,333/sq mi)
  - Urban: 963,512
  - Urban density: 3,100/km^{2} (8,000/sq mi)
  - Metro: 2,524,658
  - Metro density: 1,000/km^{2} (2,590/sq mi)

GDP
  - Prefecture-level city: CN¥ 145.0 billion US$ 21.8 billion
  - Per capita: CN¥ 40,059; US$ 6,031
- Time zone: UTC+8 (China Standard)
- Postal code: 457000
- Area code: 0393
- ISO 3166 code: CN-HA-09
- Ethnicities: Han − 99.7%; Hui − 0.16%; Mongolian − 0.04%
- County-level divisions: 6
- Township-level divisions: 89
- Average Temperature: 13.7 °C (56.7 °F)
- License Plate Prefix: 豫J
- Website: puyang.gov.cn

Puyang
- Simplified Chinese: 濮阳
- Traditional Chinese: 濮陽
- Hanyu Pinyin: Púyáng
- Postal: Puyang
Transcriptions
Standard Mandarin
- Hanyu Pinyin: Púyáng

Puyang is a prefecture-level city in northeastern Henan province, People's Republic of China. Located on the northern shore of the Yellow River, it borders Anyang in the west, Xinxiang in the southwest, and the provinces of Shandong and Hebei in the east and north respectively.

As of the 2020 census, its total population was 3,772,088 and its built-up (or metro) area made of Hualong district, Puyang County and Qingfeng County largely being conurbated, was home to 2,524,658 inhabitants.

== Administration ==
The prefecture-level city of Puyang administers 1 district and 5 counties.

- Hualong District (华龙区)
- Puyang County (濮阳县)
- Qingfeng County (清丰县)
- Nanle County (南乐县)
- Fan County (范县)
- Taiqian County (台前县)

Map
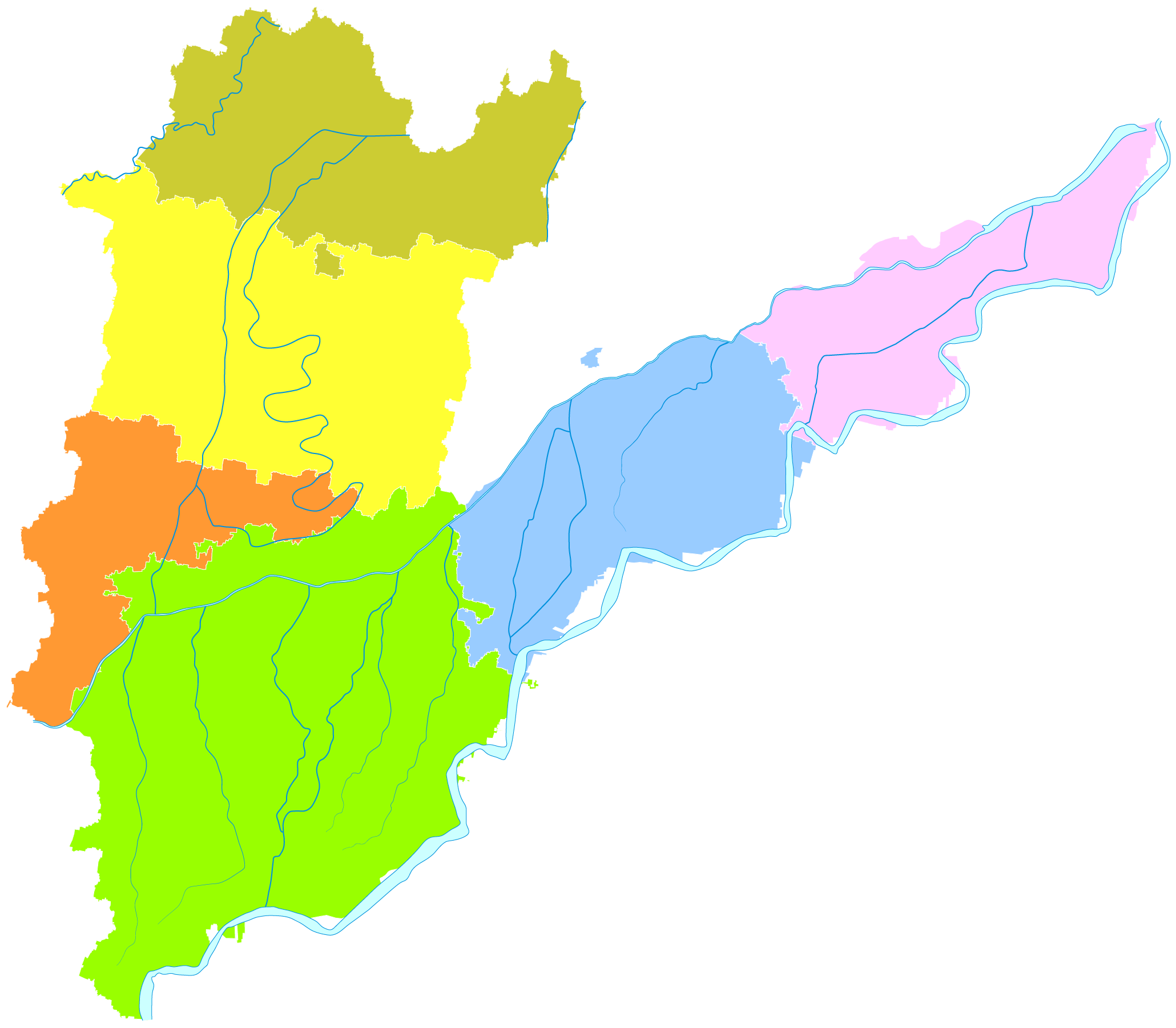

== Climate ==
Affected by the south-east Asian monsoon circulation around the year and located in the mid-latitude region, the city has a warm temperate continental monsoon climate featuring clearly demarcated seasons. In spring, it is usually dry, windy and sandy. High temperatures and heavy rainfall mark the whole summer. In autumn there are plenty of sunny days as well as long periods of sunshine. In winter, it is characterized by less snow and rainfall. The adequate sunshine meets the needs for growing crops. The annual average temperature stands at 13.72 °C (56.7 °F); the extreme maximum is 43.1 °C (110 °F), while the extreme minimum is −21 °C (−6 °F). The non-frost period lasts 205 days. The annual precipitation is around 502.3mm～601.3mm.

Climate data for Puyang, elevation 54 m (177 ft), (1991–2020 normals, extremes 1981–2010)
Month	Jan	Feb	Mar	Apr	May	Jun	Jul	Aug	Sep	Oct	Nov	Dec	Year
Record high °C (°F)	17.5 (63.5)	24.6 (76.3)	28.4 (83.1)	33.4 (92.1)	36.6 (97.9)	41.4 (106.5)	41.0 (105.8)	37.0 (98.6)	36.8 (98.2)	34.7 (94.5)	27.0 (80.6)	22.9 (73.2)	41.4 (106.5)
Mean daily maximum °C (°F)	4.5 (40.1)	8.7 (47.7)	14.9 (58.8)	21.3 (70.3)	26.8 (80.2)	31.9 (89.4)	31.9 (89.4)	30.5 (86.9)	27.0 (80.6)	21.4 (70.5)	13.0 (55.4)	6.3 (43.3)	19.9 (67.7)
Daily mean °C (°F)	−1.0 (30.2)	2.7 (36.9)	8.7 (47.7)	15.1 (59.2)	20.7 (69.3)	25.7 (78.3)	27.1 (80.8)	25.7 (78.3)	21.0 (69.8)	14.9 (58.8)	7.1 (44.8)	0.9 (33.6)	14.1 (57.3)
Mean daily minimum °C (°F)	−5.0 (23.0)	−1.8 (28.8)	3.5 (38.3)	9.4 (48.9)	15.0 (59.0)	20.2 (68.4)	23.2 (73.8)	22.0 (71.6)	16.5 (61.7)	9.9 (49.8)	2.5 (36.5)	−3.2 (26.2)	9.4 (48.8)
Record low °C (°F)	−20.0 (−4.0)	−16.7 (1.9)	−8.5 (16.7)	−2.0 (28.4)	3.8 (38.8)	11.6 (52.9)	16.1 (61.0)	11.3 (52.3)	4.1 (39.4)	−1.9 (28.6)	−18.4 (−1.1)	−15.8 (3.6)	−20.0 (−4.0)
Average precipitation mm (inches)	4.8 (0.19)	9.3 (0.37)	15.0 (0.59)	30.7 (1.21)	50.5 (1.99)	68.5 (2.70)	162.9 (6.41)	117.5 (4.63)	59.9 (2.36)	30.1 (1.19)	22.7 (0.89)	5.7 (0.22)	577.6 (22.75)
Average precipitation days (≥ 0.1 mm)	2.5	3.4	3.6	5.0	6.2	7.4	11.1	9.6	7.3	5.6	4.8	2.7	69.2
Average snowy days	3.1	2.6	0.9	0.3	0	0	0	0	0	0	0.9	2.3	10.1
Average relative humidity (%)	66	63	60	65	67	65	80	83	78	72	71	68	70
Mean monthly sunshine hours	128.5	140.9	193.1	217.5	237.3	222.2	187.1	188.6	170.3	170.0	145.9	140.5	2,141.9
Percentage possible sunshine	41	45	52	55	54	51	42	46	46	49	48	47	48
Source: China Meteorological Administration

== History ==
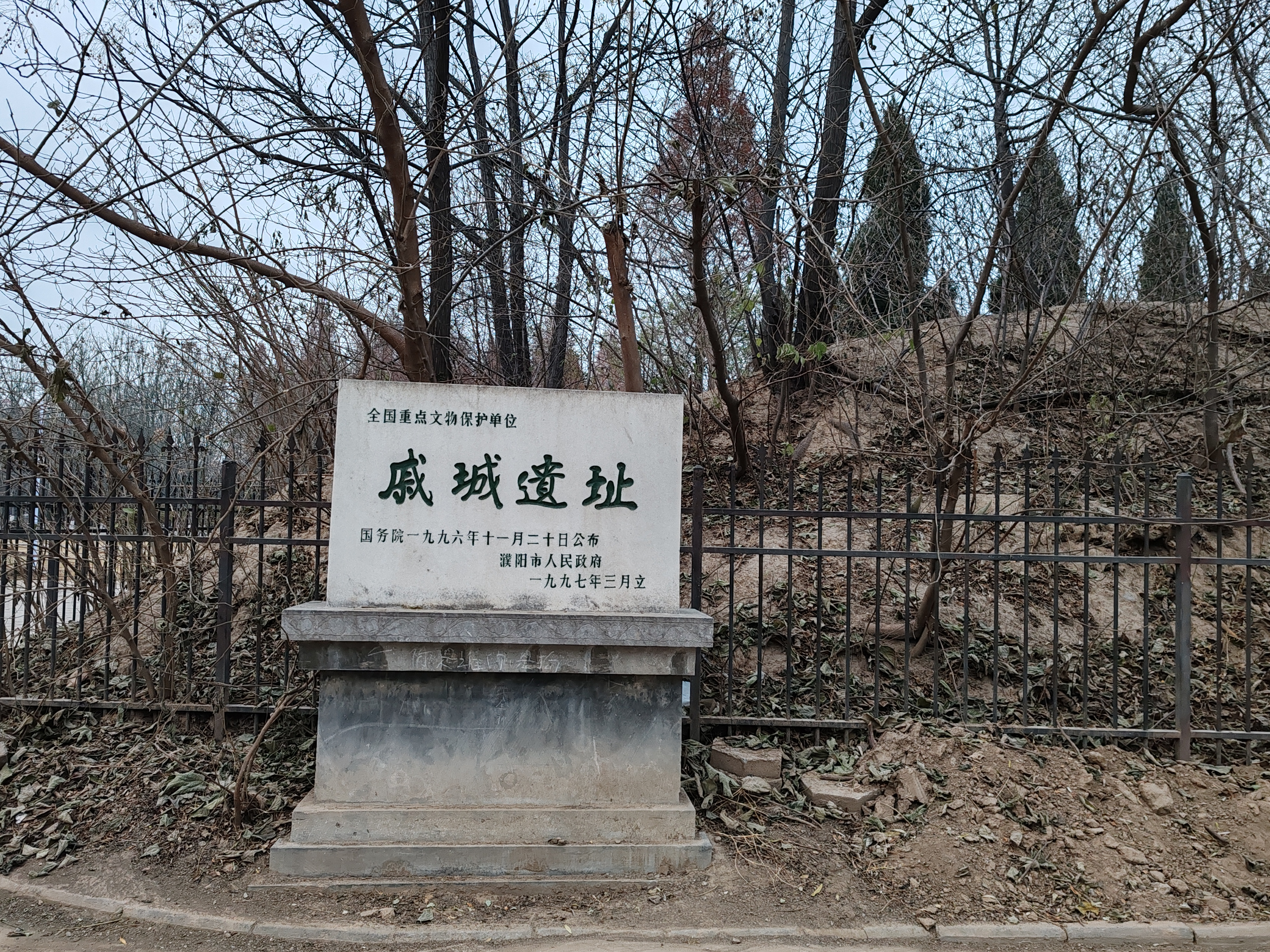
Ruins of City of Qi

The burial site of Yangshao culture features a depiction believed to be an ancient cosmogram depicting the round Heaven and the square Earth.

Puyang abounds with its historical and cultural heritage, and is widely acclaimed as one of the birthplaces of the Chinese nation. The Classic of Poetry, the earliest collection of verses in China, includes many poems that depict the countryside of Puyang. Famous historical figures from Puyang include Wu Qi, a military strategist, Shang Yang, a statesman, and Lü Buwei, a great thinker.

=== Three Kingdoms ===
During the Three Kingdoms era, Puyang served as Cao Cao's headquarters from 191 until 196 CE in Yan Province and served as the battlefield for the Battle of Yan Province from 194–195 CE.

=== Qing Dynasty and Republic of China ===
Puyang was a county of Daming Prefecture, Zhili province. In 1928, Zhili was abolished and Puyang was incorporated into Henan province.

=== People's Republic of China ===
In August 1949 Puyang was taken back from Henan and included in the experimental province Pingyuan. In November 1953 it was finally reinstated under the Henan administration.

In 1987 a historical relic, made up of a series of clams arranged in dragon patterns, was unearthed. The valuable discovery, which could be dated back to more than 6,400 years ago, had pushed forward the history of Chinese civilization for over 1,400 years, and therefore earned itself an international reputation of "the First Dragon of China". The Chinese Yanhuang Culture Researching Association has accordingly named Puyang "the Hometown of Chinese Dragons". Abundant heritage along with a long history has endowed Puyang with plenty of tourism resources, which is certainly of great investment value. Chinese scholars therefore regard Puyang as one of the important birthplaces of Chinese civilization.

== Tourist sites ==
Until the end of 2012, Puyang has 4 national cultural relics protection units: Qicheng Relics, Tangwu Gong Tablet, the former sites of the revolutionary armies which is including Yancunpu revolutionary site and Shanguai former revolutionary base; 25 provincial cultural relics protection units: Xishuiipo Relics, Huiluan Tablet, the memorial site of the revolutionary armies crossing the river, Chengzhuang site, Tieqiu site, Mazhuang site, Xiancheng Relics, Sipai Pavilion (including the nearby folk houses), the tombstone of Wei's family, Puyang Christ church (including the former site of Huamei school), the Martyrs' Cemetery of Weihe county, the former headquarters of PLA, Balimiao Yellow River –controlling memorial (including the iron beast), Nanle Confucius temple, Kuaikui platform site, Cangjie mausoleum site, Danzhu Tomb, zilu Mausoleum, the headquarters site of the field army, the Puzhao Temple, Gaocheng Relics, Xiaqiu site, the anti-Japanese martyrs' shrine in Qingfeng county, the former administration site of Zhinan CPC, Puyang Catholic church. The key cultural relics protection units of city and county level have 201 sites.

The main tourist attractions in the city area are Zhongyuan Green Manor, Qicheng Relics, Pushang Park, Cangjie Tomb, Zhanghui Mausoleum, Emperor Shun's Palace, Huiluan Tablet, Imperial Well, Sipai Pavilion, the four street of Ming & Qing dynasties, the hometown of Emperor Shun, Yancunpu revolutionary site, Shanguai former revolutionary base, the museum of the Liu-Deng Army crossing Yellow River, Puyang Science and Technology Museum etc. In 1994, the line of Confucius traveling around the world 2500 years ago had been approved by China National Tourism Administration and State Administration of Cultural Heritage as the first Chinese tourism special line of cultural relics and historic sites, including Puyang Qicheng Relics, Zilu Tomb, Huiluan Tablet etc. After 1999, Puyang opened up another five special tourism lines. In 2005, puyang one-day red tour, two-day tour had been launched and the PLA sites tour containing Shanguai, Sunkou had been recommended by Henan Tourism Administration as a provincial red tourism line. After 2006, relying on the abundant history and culture resources and its morden city landscape, Puyang developed its tourism deeply and greatly. Till now, Puyang has successfully developed and created a series of tourist brands: the city scenery tour represented by the city squares, gardens and parks, and the water system; the ecological environment tour represented by Zhongyuan Green Manor and Pushang Park; the historical and cultural tour by Qicheng Relics and Cangjie Tomb; the Yellow River scenery tour by Maolou Ecological Tourism Zone; the surname & root seeking tour by Zhanghui Mausoleum and Emperor Shun's Palace; the leisure acrobatics tour by Dongbei village's original acrobatics and modern "Water show" acrobatics; the scientific knowledge tour by Puyang Science and Technology Museum, the efficient agriculture tour by Shijin Park; the classical red tour by Shanguai former revolutionary base and the museum of the Liu-Deng Army crossing the Yellow River; and the modern industry tour by Zhongyuan Oilfield, Zhongyuan Ethylene Plant and Zhongyuan Dahua Group Ltd. etc.

== Natural resources ==
Puyang is a petrol-chemical city. The major mineral resources include petroleum, natural gas, coal, etc. especially rich reserve of high-quality petroleum and natural gas. As an important national petrol-chemical energy base, large-sized enterprises such as Zhongyuan Oilfield, China Petroleum & Chemical Corporation, Zhongyuan Dahua Group and so on have been established there. The petrol-chemical industry has become the support of Puyang's economy.
