= Transport in Beijing =

Transport system in Chinese municipality

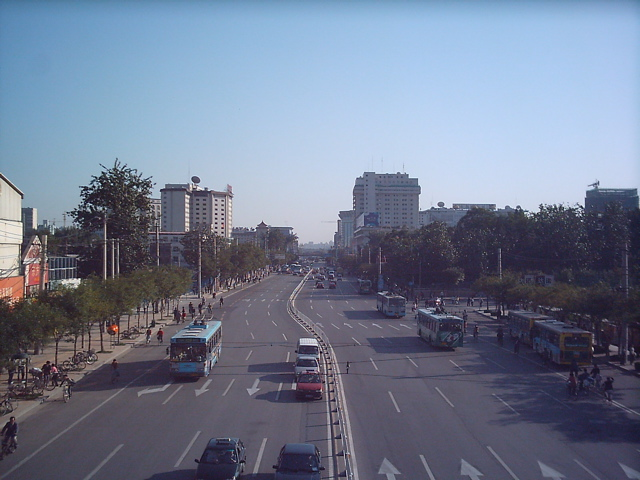
Roads in Beijing

Beijing, as the capital and one of the four municipalities of the People's Republic of China (PRC), is a transport hub, with a sophisticated network of roads, railways and two major airports. Six completed ring roads encircle the city with nine expressways heading in virtually all compass directions, supplemented by eleven China National Highways.

Transport in the capital is overseen by the Beijing Municipal Commission of Transport.

== Road network ==
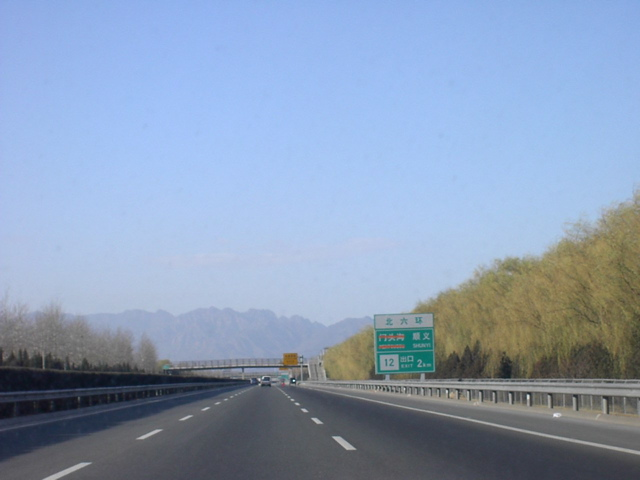
The Badaling Expressway near the intersection with the Northern 6th Ring Road (taken in November 2002)

=== Ring roads ===
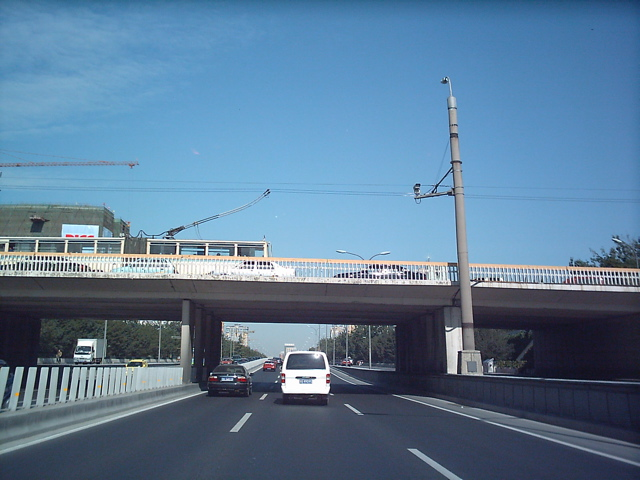
The 2nd Ring Road at Chaoyangmen

The city is served by six completed ring roads. From the centre of the city outward, they are:

- 2nd Ring Road
- 3rd Ring Road
- 4th Ring Road
- 5th Ring Road
- 6th Ring Road

The "1st Ring" of Beijing refers to the historic tram route (now demolished) through Xidan, Ping'anli, Di'anmen, Beixinqiao, Dongdan and Tiananmen. No ring roads are built on this route but it is still called "1st Ring". From that on, ring road built on Beijing's historic city limit is called 2nd Ring.

The G95 Capital Area Loop Expressway, which has sections in Beijing's Pinggu, Tongzhou, & Daxing districts, is often unofficially referred to as the "7th Ring Road".

=== Expressways ===
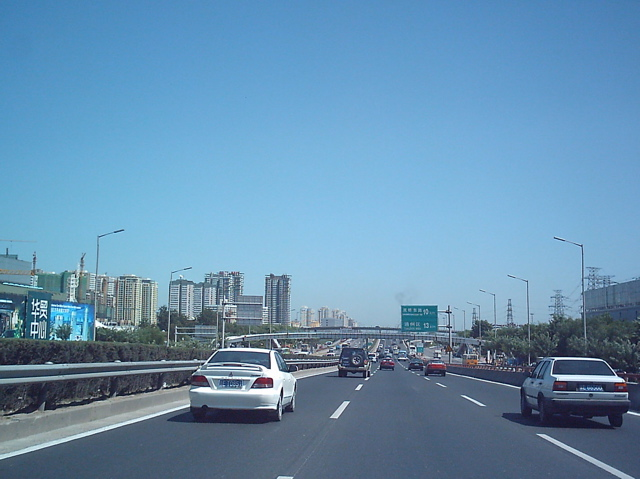
The Jingtong Expressway

Main topic: Expressways of Beijing

Nine toll expressways link Beijing to its suburbs, outlying regions, and other cities; these are:

- Jingzang Expressway (Madian Bridge to Badaling and Yanqing District)
- Jingcheng Expressway (Connects Beijing to Chengde in Hebei province)
- Airport Expressway (Sanyuanqiao to Beijing Capital International Airport)
- Jingtong Expressway (Dawang Bridge – Tongzhou District)
- Jingha Expressway (Beiguan Roundabout – Yanjiao in Hebei province)
- Jingshen Expressway (Sifang Bridge – Shenyang)
- Jinghu Expressway (Runs from Beijing to Shanghai)
- Jingkai Expressway (Yuquanying–Yufa)
- Jingshi Expressway (Liuliqiao–Shijiazhuang)

=== China National Highways ===
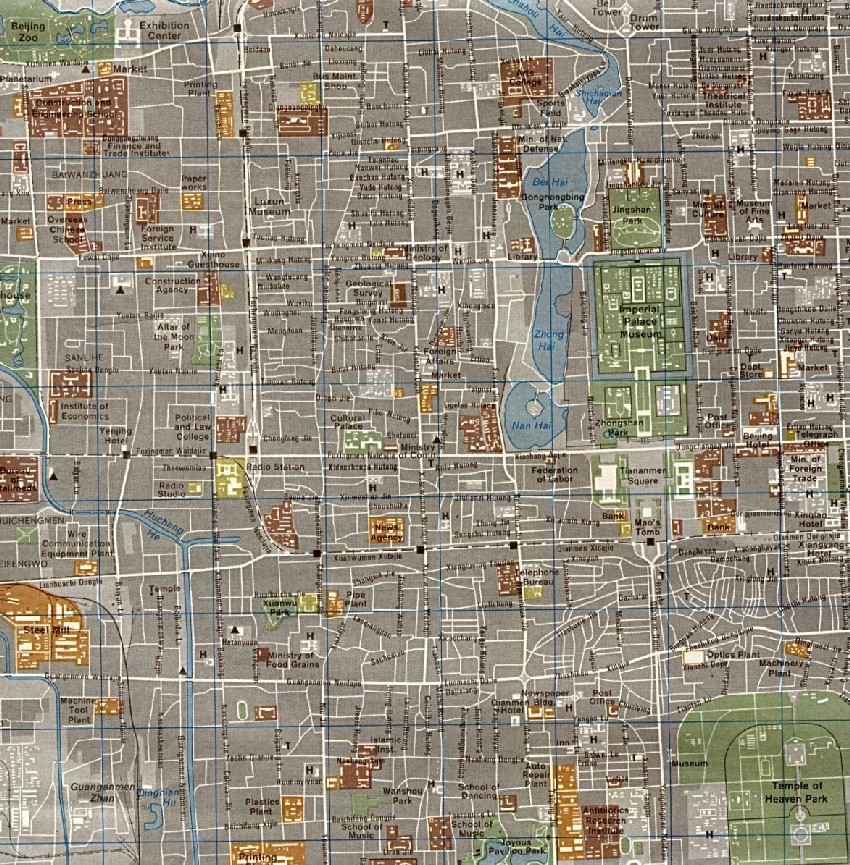
Map of central Beijing (1988)

Eleven China National Highway routes depart from Beijing in virtually all compass directions:

- China National Highway 101 (Dongzhimen–Chengde–Shenyang)
- China National Highway 102 (Chaoyangmen–Harbin)
- China National Highway 103 (Fenzhongsi–Tianjin–Tanggu)
- China National Highway 104 (Yongdingmen–Fuzhou)
- China National Highway 105 (Yongdingmen–Zhuhai–Macau)
- China National Highway 106 (Yuquanying–Guangzhou)
- China National Highway 107 (Guang'anmen–Shenzhen)
- China National Highway 108 (Fuxingmen–Kunming)
- China National Highway 109 (Fuchengmen–Lhasa)
- China National Highway 110 (Deshengmen–Yinchuan)
- China National Highway 111 (Dongzhimen–Heilongjiang province)

=== Traffic congestion ===
Beijing as of 2011 has an estimated 5 million registered cars on its roads, so traffic congestion is widespread. Traffic in the city centre is often gridlocked and is only predicted to get worse as the number of vehicles on Beijing's roads increase. It is predicted by 2016 Beijing will have over 6 million cars on its roads. To combat congestion the local government has rapidly been building the subway system adding more lines and working towards doubling the length of the subway system by 2015. In addition to this they have decreased the cost of fares in an attempt to encourage more people to use public transport. In 2008 Beijing introduced restrictions on the number of cars on its roads in attempt to reduce congestion and pollution during the Olympic games period. They did this by adopting odd-even traffic restriction on alternative days. Cars with number plates ending with odd numbers were restricted one day and the next day cars with number plates ending with even numbers were restricted. Drivers who were unable to use their cars did not have to pay road or vehicle taxes, costing the city around 1.3 billion yuan. On Feb 21, 2022, Beijing experienced its worst traffic in five years due to the beginning of school and reserved Olympic lanes remaining closed to the public.

== Urban public transportation ==
Beijing has an extensive public transportation network of buses, trolleybuses, suburban rail and a rapidly expanding subway system.

=== Beijing Subway ===
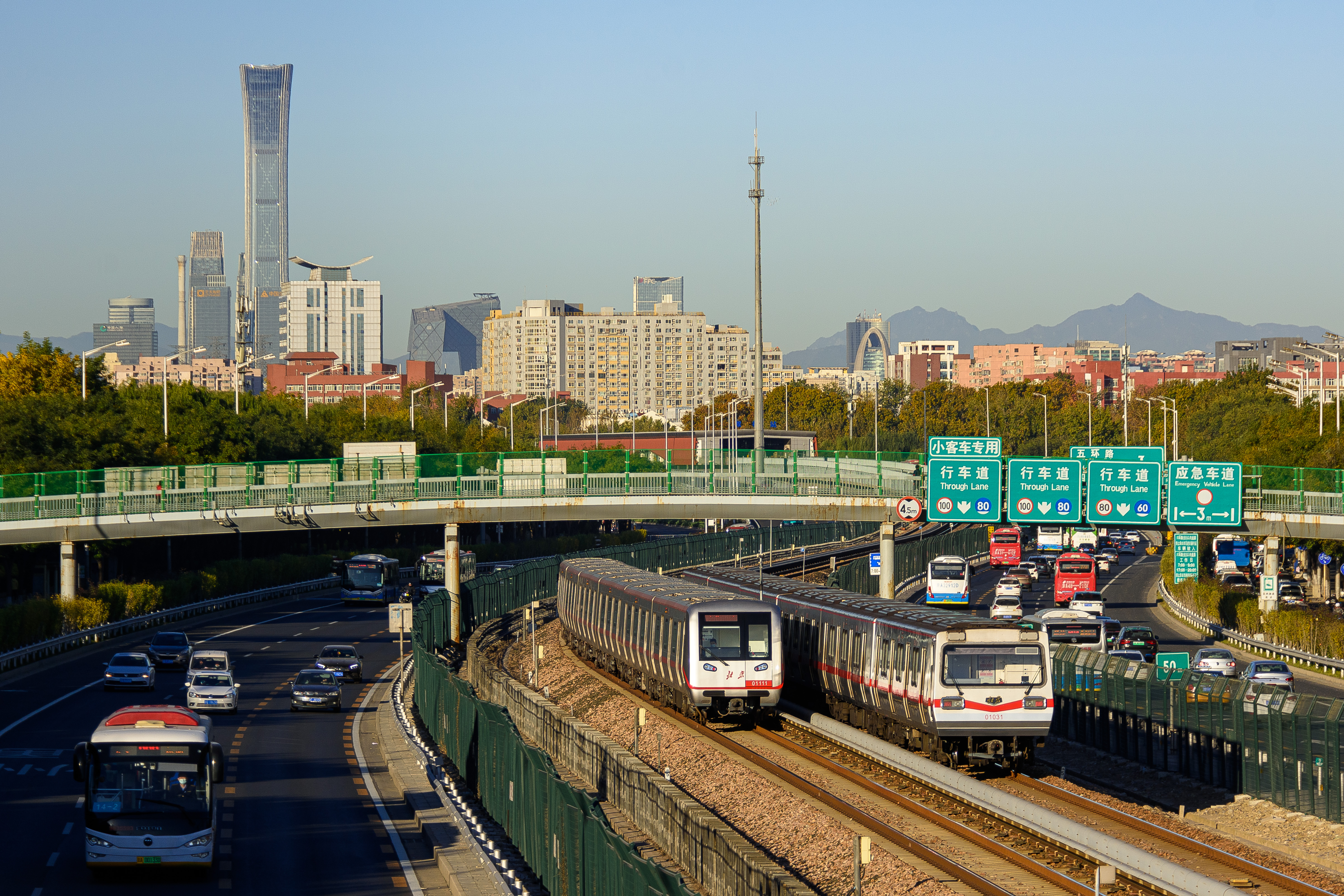
Line 1 trains on Batong line

The Beijing Subway now has 29 lines and 523 stations, covering 879 km (546 mi). Subway travel is generally fast, clean, economical and during peak periods congested. As of 2023, on average, around 9.46 million journeys are taken on the metro each day, with this number increasing to around 10.8 on working days. A ¥3 minimum fare that rises according to the distance travelled applies to all lines, except the Capital Airport Express (¥25) and the Daxing Airport Express (¥10 - ¥35). The electronic commuter fare card, Yikatong is accepted on all lines.

=== Beijing Suburban Railway ===
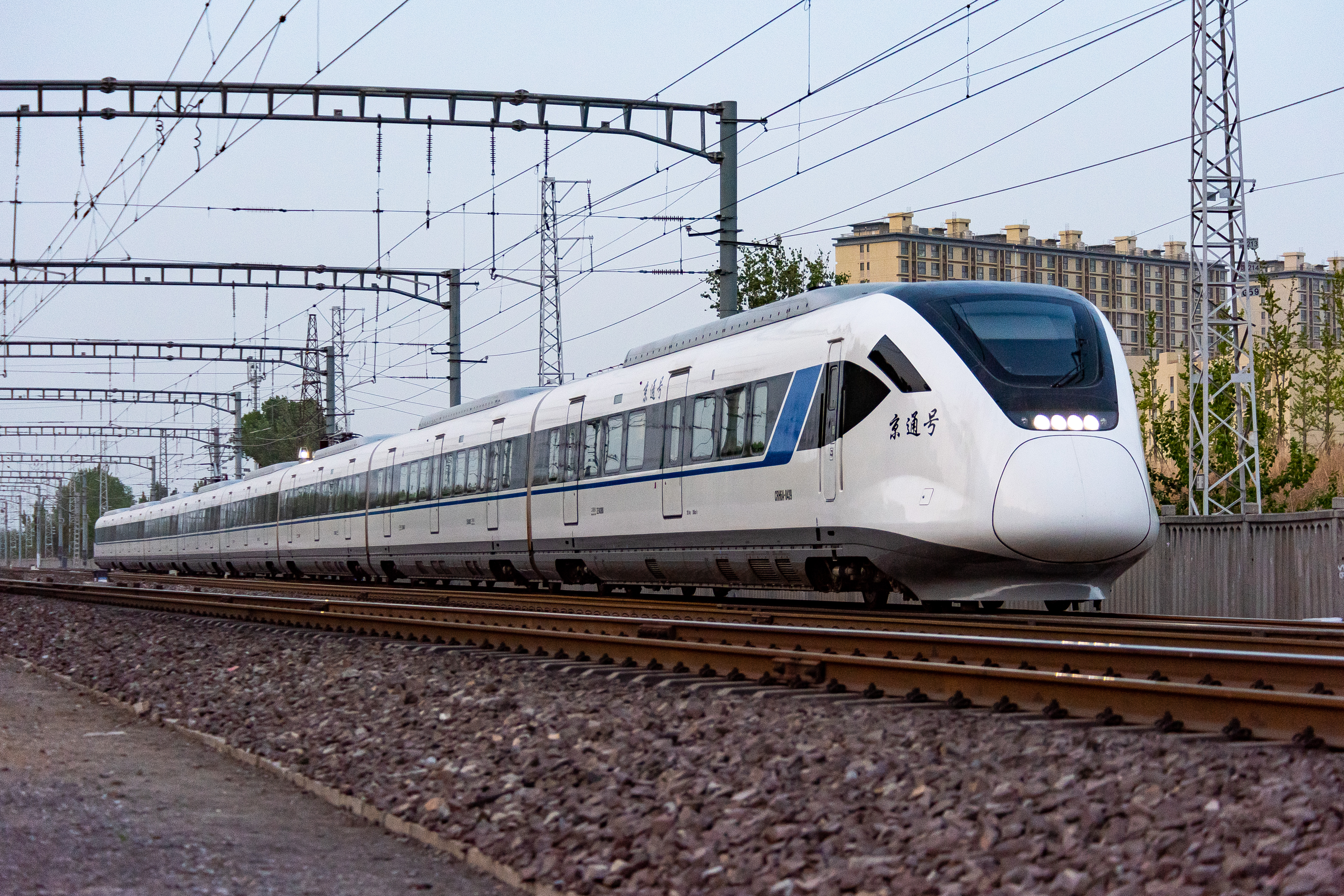
A Sub-Central line train in Fangshan

The Beijing Suburban Railway, a suburban commuter train service, is managed separately from the Beijing Subway. The two systems, although complementary, are not related to each other operationally. Beijing Suburban Railway is run as part of the China Railway Beijing Group.

There are 4 suburban railway lines currently in operation: Line S2, Sub-Central line, Huairou–Miyun line and Tongmi line.

=== Bus, Trolleybus and BRT ===
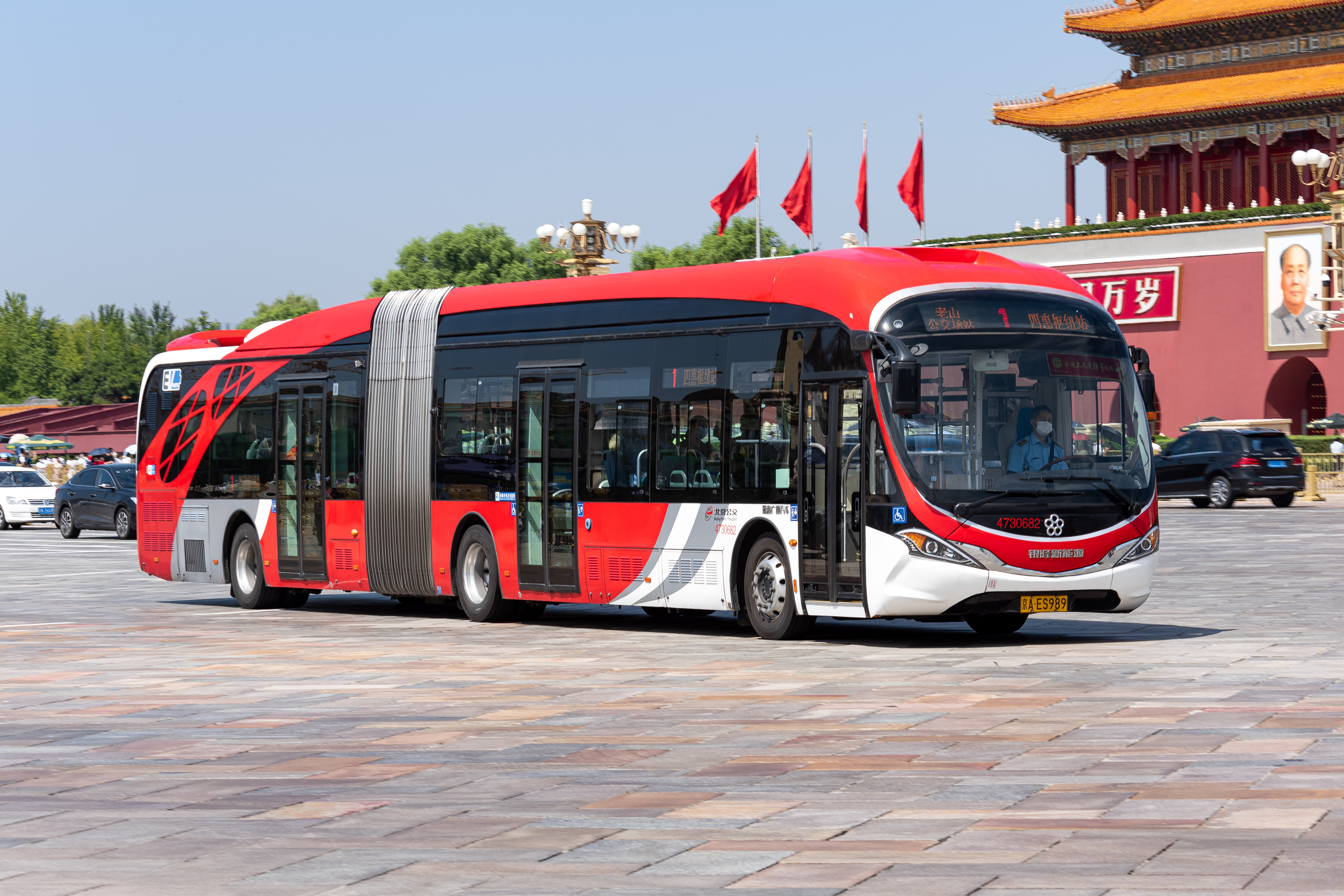
Beijing Bus No. 1 on Chang'an Boulevard at Tiananmen Square.

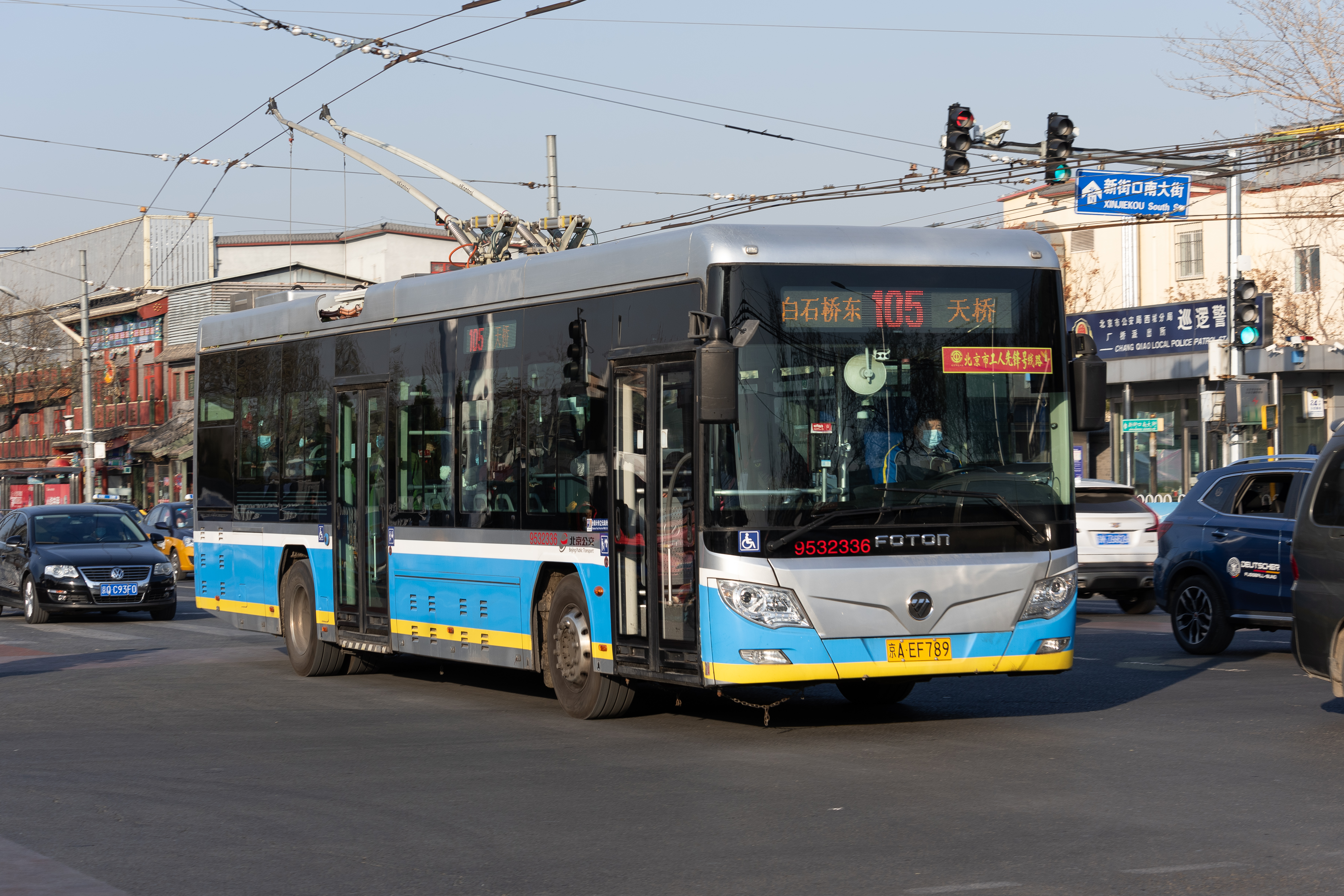
A Beijing trolleybus.

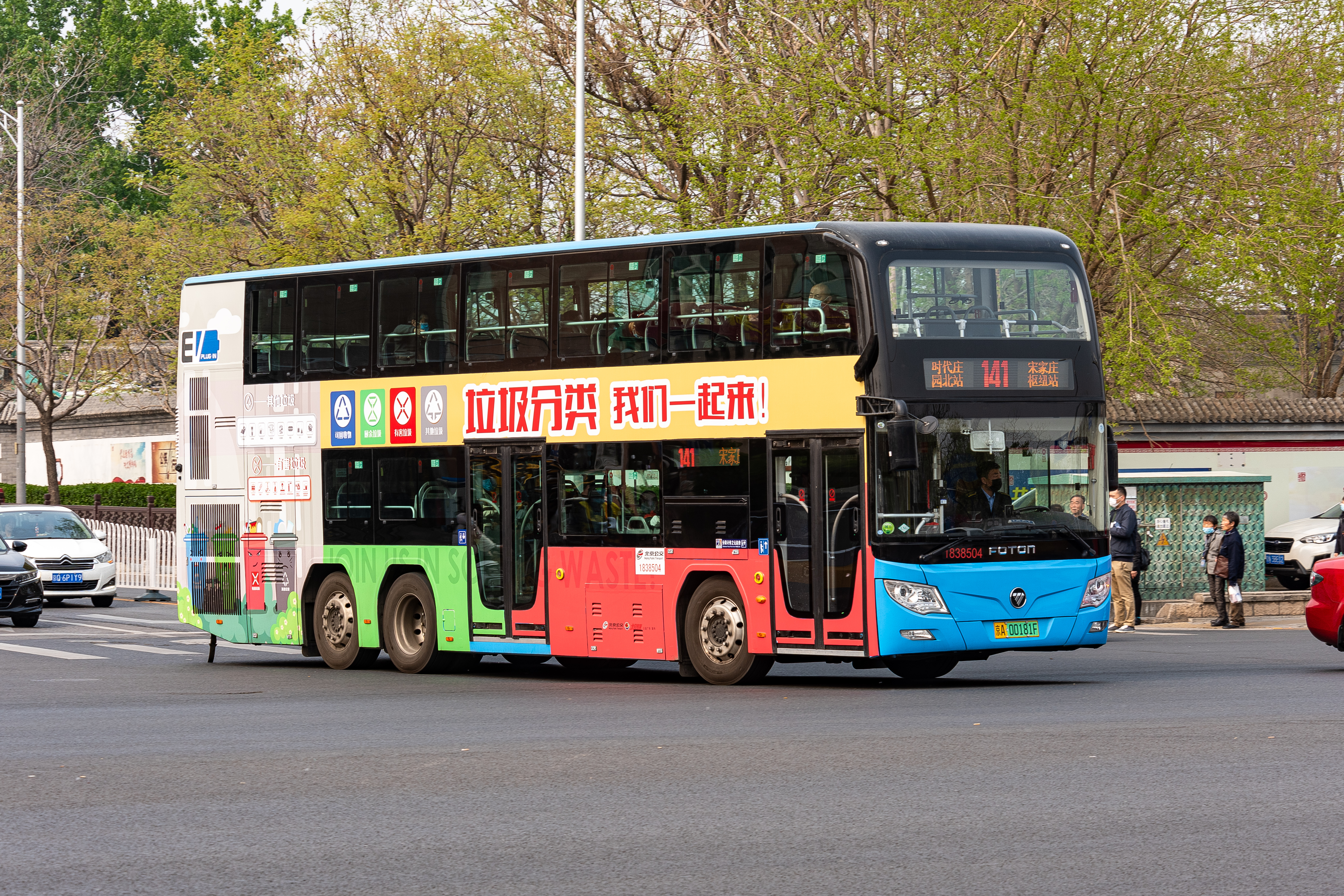
Double-Decker Bus No. 141 in Beijing

The Beijing Public Transport Holdings, Ltd. ("BPT") is the main bus and trolleybus operator in the city. It is owned by the city and, as of 2009, operated nearly 28,000 buses (including trolleybuses) on 882 bus routes and delivered 5.03 billion rides in 2009. in 2011, Beijing had more than 28,343 buses carrying over 13.39 million person/trips a day. Over 1,100 Dual-mode trolleybuses operate on 29 routes and is gradually being expanded to combat urban air pollution. BPT also currently operates 4 bus rapid transit lines.

==== Bus pass ====
The BPT offered month-long bus passes until 2006.

==== Bus enquiry services ====
The BPT provides enquiry services via both its official website http://www.bjbus.com and a helpline: +86-10-96166.

== Taxi ==
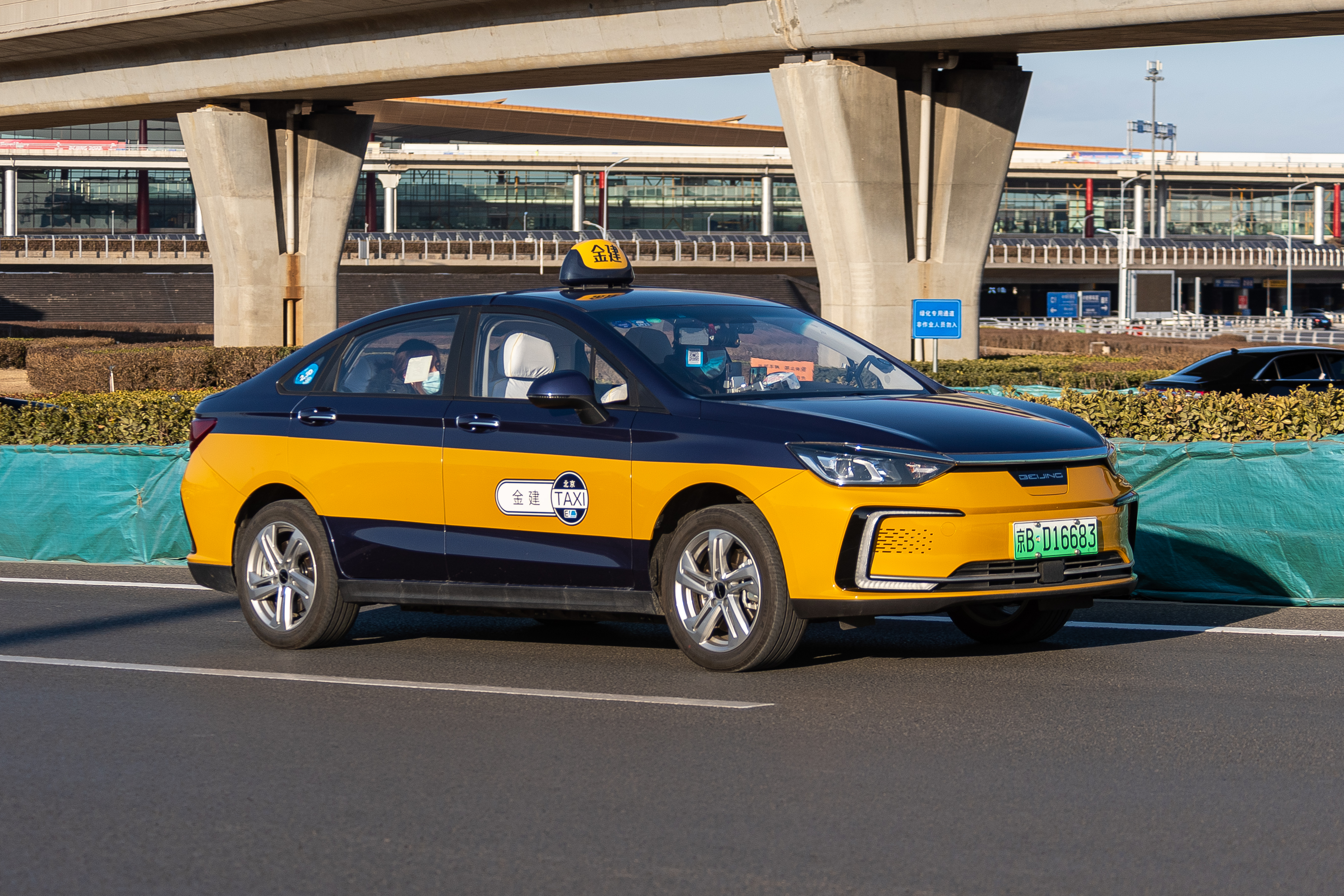
A Beijing EU5 taxi leaving Beijing Capital International Airport Terminal 3

Taxi fares depend on the vehicle type: these start at CNY 13 for the first 3 kilometers, and go up by CNY2.30 per extra kilometer; the per-kilometer charge is based upon the make and model of the vehicle. After 10 pm the base fare goes up by 20%. Idling time is also factored into the total fare, which is CNY2.30 (CNY4.60 during rush hours of 07:00−09:00 and 17:00−19:00) per 5 minutes of standing or running at speeds lower than 12 km/h (7.5 mph) . All legal cabs will be part golden yellow or all black in color, and display their permits and paperwork on the dash board and windshield.

There are also many illegal cabs known as 黑车; Hēi chē (meaning 'Black Cabs' as in "black market" or "illegal"), which operate via a pre-negotiated fare.

Taxi-like services, including Pedicabs, are also widely used. A motorized or manual bicycle is probably the most commonly seen form, although pedicabs are still available in certain parts of the city. These quaint modes of transport also employ the pre-negotiated fare system

In 1999, the environmentally unsound "bread cars" (Minivans) (Chinese: 面包车; pinyin: Miàn bāo chē) were decommissioned in a stringent manner. They used to charge CNY 1 per kilometre. Although it was sound, budget-wise, their poor environmental record and an increasing consciousness of the image of the capital were the factors that landed them in the dumpster. As of 2004, 1.20 RMB/km taxicabs were phased out, and as of 2006 all taxi fares were 2.00 RMB per km with the same 10 RMB starting fare for 3 km rule. The Hyundai Elantra is the common new type of taxi, along with the Volkswagen Jetta CiF.

== Intercity transportation ==
=== Air ===
==== Beijing Capital International Airport ====
Beijing has two of the world's largest airports. Beijing Capital International Airport (IATA: PEK) is located in bordering Shunyi and being 32 kilometres (20 mi) northeast of the city center in Chaoyang. It is the second busiest airport in the world after Atlanta's Hartsfield-Jackson International Airport. Capital Airport's Terminal 3, built during the expansion for the 2008 Olympics, is one of the largest in the world. Capital Airport is the main hub for Air China and Hainan Airlines. The Airport Expressway and Second Airport Expressway, connects to Capital Airport from the northeast and east of the city center, respectively. Driving time from city center is about 40 minutes under normal traffic conditions. The Capital Airport Express line of Beijing Subway and the Capital Airport Bus serves the Capital Airport.

==== Beijing Daxing International Airport ====
Beijing Daxing International Airport (IATA: PKX) located 46 kilometres (29 mi) south of the city in Daxing District bordering the city of Langfang, Hebei Province, opened on September 25, 2019. The Daxing Airport has one of the world's largest terminal buildings and is expected to be a major airport serving Beijing, Tianjin and northern Hebei Province. Daxing Airport is connected to the city via the Beijing–Xiong'an intercity railway, the Daxing Airport Express line of the Beijing Subway and two expressways.

==== Other airports ====
With the opening of the Daxing Airport in September 2019, the Beijing Nanyuan Airport (IATA: NAY), located 13 kilometres (8.1 mi) south of city center in Fengtai District, has been closed to civilian airline service. Other airports in the city at Liangxiang, Xijiao, Shahe and Badaling are primarily for military use.

==== Visa requirements for air passengers ====
As of June 2026, visitors from 53 countries are permitted a 240-hour visa-free transit visit in Beijing, where the 240 hours is calculated from midnight of the day after entry and visitors are only permitted to stay within Beijing. Nationals from 50 countries are also permitted a 30-day visa-free stay in China.

=== Trains ===
==== Stations ====
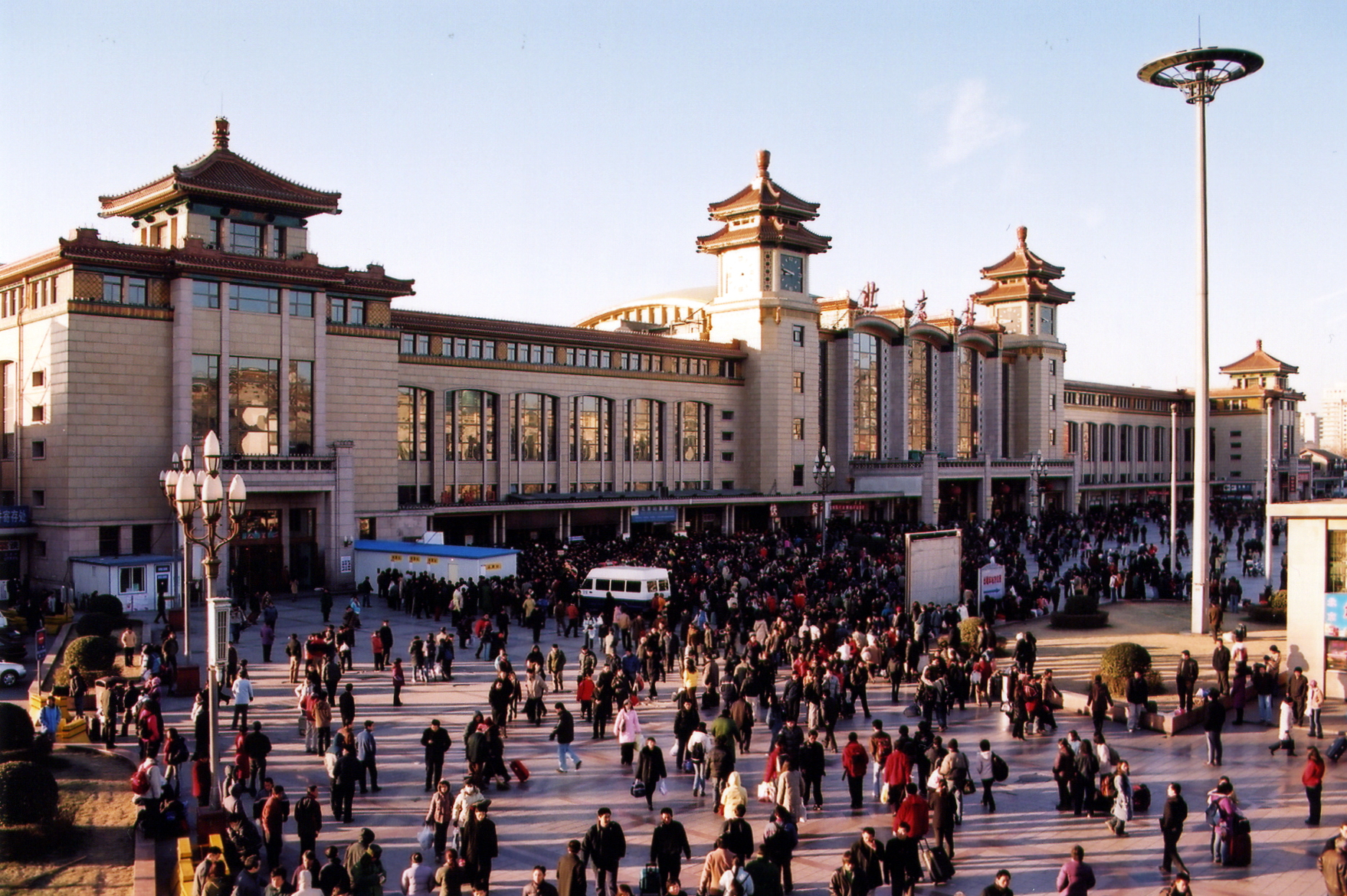
Beijing railway station

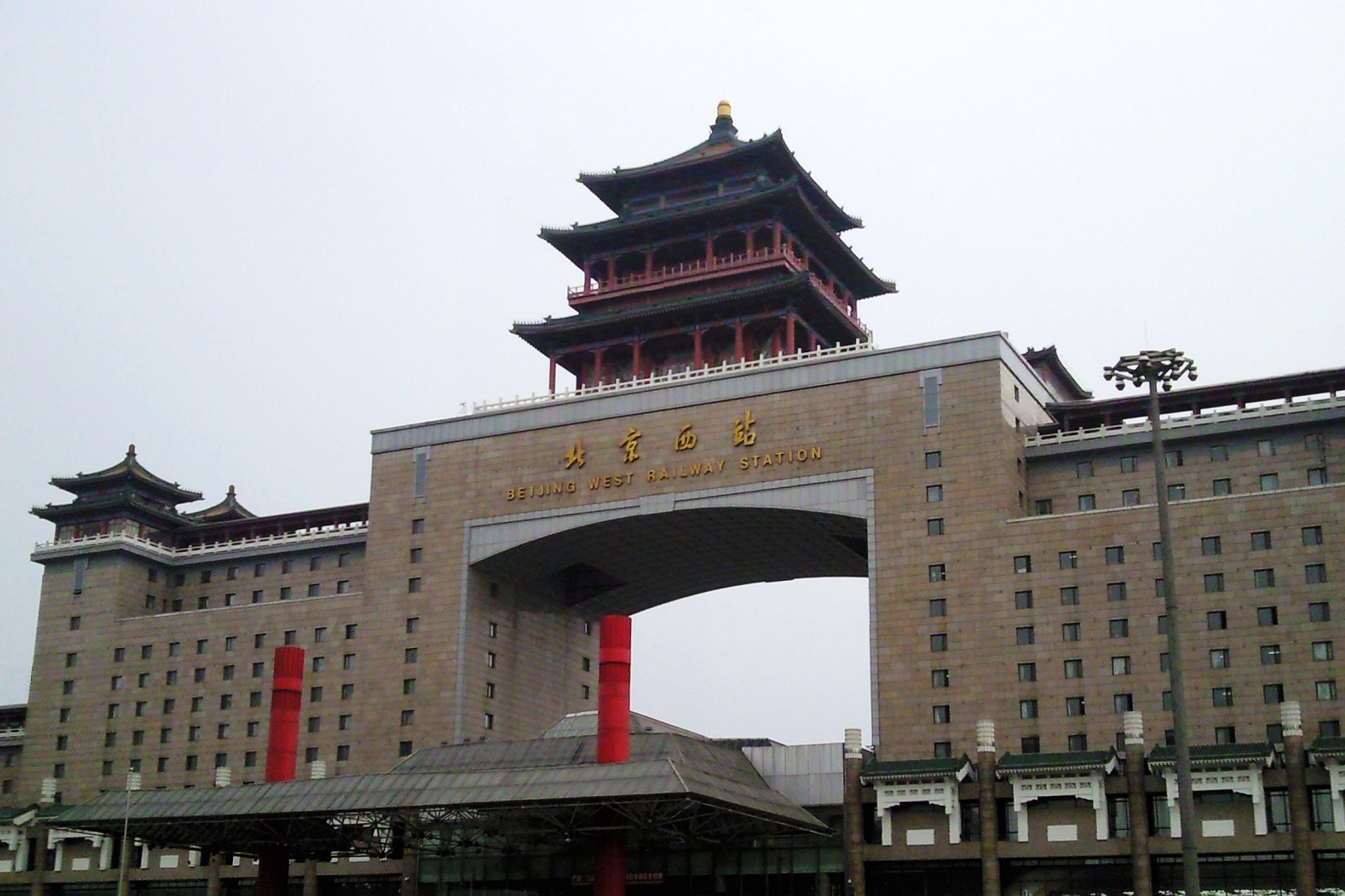
Beijing West railway station

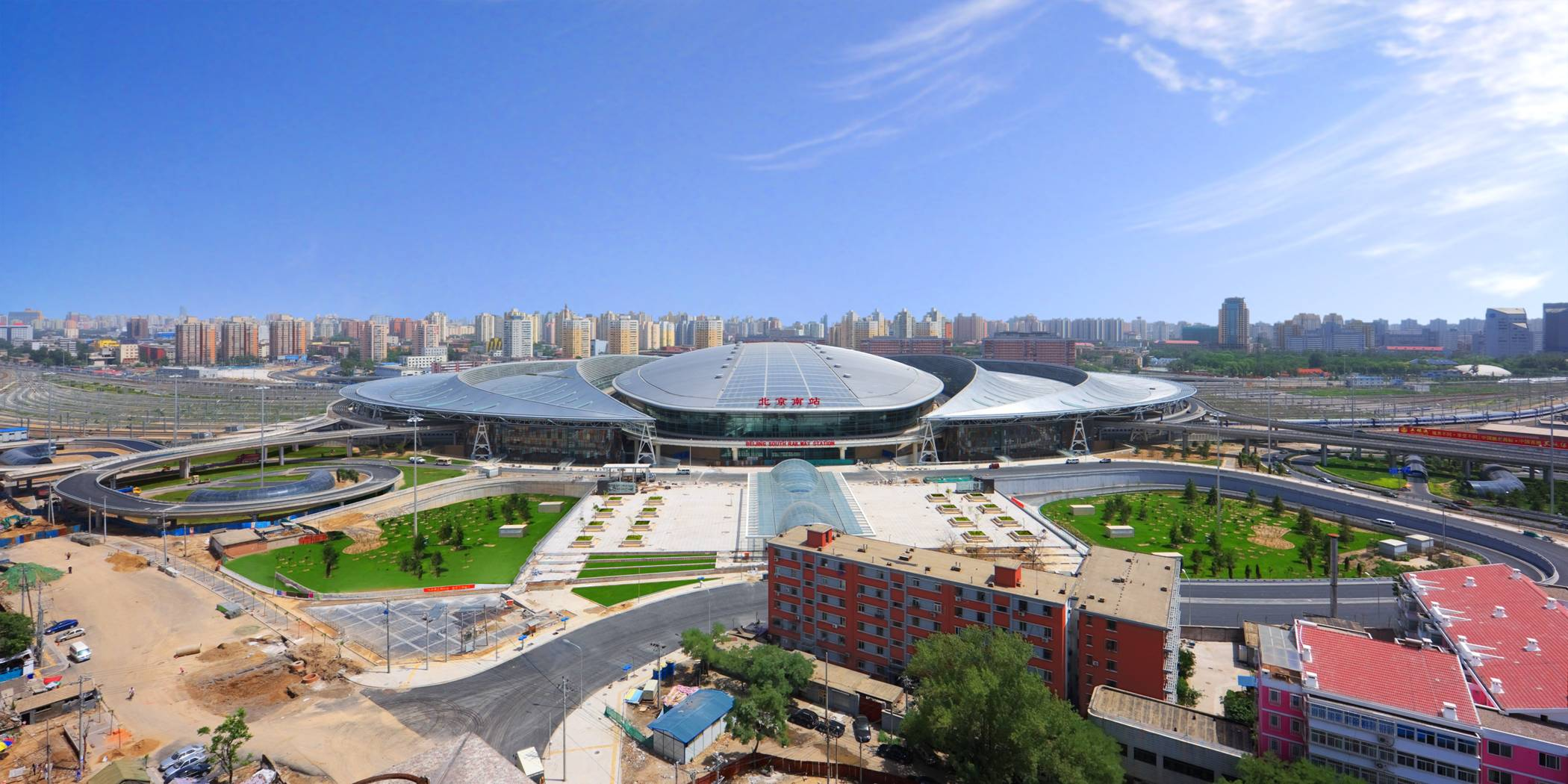
Beijing South railway station

Beijing's four main railway stations are Beijing railway station, Beijing North, Beijing West and Beijing South, while other major railway stations include Beijing Chaoyang, Beijing Tongzhou, and Beijing Fengtai. There are several other intercity and intermediate stations in urban Beijing, including Beijing East, Qinghe, and Changping North.

==== Railways ====
Beijing is a major railway hub in China's railway network. The following eight major railways radiate out of Beijing:

- Jingguang Railway, to Guangzhou, Guangdong
- Jinghu Railway, to Shanghai
- Jingha Railway (includes Jingqin Railway), to Harbin, Heilongjiang
- Jingbao Railway, to Baotou, Inner Mongolia
- Jingtong Railway, to Tongliao, Inner Mongolia
- Jingyuan Railway, to Yuanping, Shanxi
- Jingcheng Railway, to Chengde, Hebei
- Jingjiu Railway, to Shenzhen, Guangdong (Jiu refers to Kowloon, in Hong Kong across the border).

The city also hosts a number of high speed railway lines:

- Beijing-Tianjin Intercity Railway, to Tianjin
- Beijing-Shanghai High Speed Railway, to Shanghai
- Jingguang High-speed Railway, to Shijiazhuang, Wuhan and Guangzhou, opening late 2012.

Further high speed connections being proposed include links to Shenyang, Tangshan, Zhangjiakou, Kowloon, Taipei, and Taiyuan.

==== International trains departing from Beijing ====
There are a number of cross-border international trains departing from Beijing to neighbouring countries. The Trans-Siberian train to Ulaanbaatar (Mongolia) and then onto Moscow (Russia) departs from Beijing. There are also trains to Pyongyang (North Korea) and Hanoi (Vietnam) which depart from Beijing. The trains also stop at other cities and towns along the route. International trains currently depart from Beijing West Railway Station and Beijing Railway Station. The following is a guide to the international services which depart Beijing.

- K3/4: Beijing to Moscow via Ulaanbaatar: Departs from Beijing Railway Station every Wednesday at 7:45 a.m.
- Z5/6: Beijing to Hanoi via Nanning: Departs from Beijing West Railway Station every Thursday and Friday at 4:08 p.m.
- K19/20: Beijing to Moscow: Departs from Beijing Railway Station every Saturday at 11:00 p.m.
- K23/24: Beijing to Ulaanbaatar: Departs from Beijing Railway Station every Saturday at 7:45 a.m.
- K27/28: Beijing to Pyongyang: Departs from Beijing Railway Station every Monday, Wednesday, Thursday and Saturday at 5:30 p.m.
- T97B/98B: Beijing to Kowloon: Through the Beijing–Guangzhou and the Guangzhou–Shenzhen railways. (Hong Kong is a special administrative region of the People's Republic of China. To cross the boundary between mainland China and Hong Kong, passengers have to go through immigration and customs checks, like international trains.)

== See also ==
- Grand Canal of China
- Transport in the People's Republic of China
