= China National Highways of Beijing =

Road network in Beijing, China

The China National Highways of Beijing article focuses on Beijing as a national transport hub and the starting point for eleven of the twelve series-100 China National Highways. These are major truck routes, some of which are toll roads, primarily intended to connect Beijing with the rest of China.

China National Highway 112, despite being a series-100 China National Highway, does not begin in Beijing but instead starts in Gaobeidian and forms a long ring route.

The 'G' in front of the highway route numbers stands for 国 (pinyin: guó), meaning nation or country.

== Beijing routes ==
The eleven China National Highway routes depart from Beijing in a spread of compass directions:

- China National Highway 101 to Chengde and Shenyang leaves Beijing at Dongzhimen, heading north-east at Sanyuanqiao;
- China National Highway 102 to Harbin leaves Beijing at Chaoyangmen, heading east;
- China National Highway 103 to Tanggu leaves Beijing at Fenzhongsi, heading south-east near the Jingjintang Expressway;
- China National Highway 104 to Fuzhou leaves Beijing at Yongdingmen, heading south;
- China National Highway 105 to Zhuhai and Macau leaves Beijing at Yongdingmen as well, also heading south;
- China National Highway 106 to Guangzhou leaves Beijing at Yuquanying;
- China National Highway 107 to Shenzhen leaves Beijing at Guang'anmen, heading south-west;
- China National Highway 108 (also known as Jingyuan Road) to Kunming leaves Beijing at Fuxingmen, heading west;
- China National Highway 109 to Lhasa in Tibet leaves Beijing at Fuchengmen, heading west;
- China National Highway 110 to Yinchuan leaves Beijing at Deshengmen, heading north.
- China National Highway 111 leaves Beijing at Dongzhimen, heading northeast, ending in Heilongjiang province.

813 kilometres of the system lies within Beijing municipality.

Tiananmen is considered "km 0" for all China National Highways.
