= Lin Jun =

Lin Jun may refer to:

- Lin Jun (engineer) (born 1954), Chinese engineer
- Lin Jun (politician) (born 1949), Chinese politician
- Murder of Lin Jun, 2012 murder of a Chinese student in Canada
