= David S. G. Goodman =

Australian academic

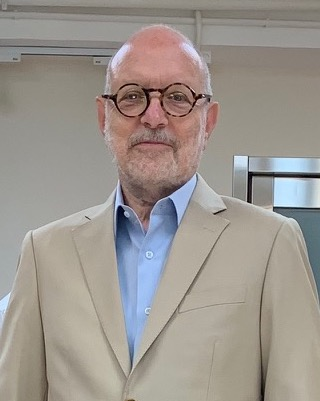
David SG Goodman

David Stephen Gordon Goodman is Director of the China Studies Centre, University of Sydney, where he is also Emeritus Professor of Chinese Politics in the Department of Government and International Relations. He is also Emeritus Professor in the Department of China Studies at Xi'an Jiaotong-Liverpool University in Suzhou, China; and Emeritus Professor in the Australia-China Relations Institute at the University of Technology, Sydney. Prof Goodman is a Fellow of the Academy of Social Sciences in Australia.

== Biography and academic career ==
Goodman was born in Watford, England. He was educated at the University of Manchester (politics and modern history) and the London School of Oriental and African Studies (Chinese language and Chinese politics). He also studied economics at Peking University. Goodman's university teaching since 1971 has focused on Chinese society, politics, history, and literature.

From 2017 to 2021 Goodman was Vice President Academic Affairs at Xi'an Jiaotong Liverpool University, in Suzhou, where he was previously (2014-2017) Professor and Head of the Department of China Studies, and (2016-2017) Head of Humanities and Social Sciences. He served in the past as Acting Director and Academic Director of the China Studies Centre at the University of Sydney (2010–14), the Director of the Institute of Social Sciences at University of Sydney (2009–2010), Deputy Vice-Chancellor (International) and Vice-President of the University of Technology, Sydney (2004–2008), Director of the Institute for International Studies at the University of Technology, Sydney (1994–2004), Director of the Asia Research Centre at Murdoch University (1991–1993), and Director of the East Asia Centre at the University of Newcastle upon Tyne (1985–1988).

In 2000 he was elected a fellow of the Academy of the Social Sciences in Australia in the discipline of political science. In 2001 he received the IDP Education Australia Award as International Educator of the Year. He received a DLitt from the University of Technology, Sydney in 2008 for his research on Provincial China. During 2012-2016 he was a PRC Ministry of Education Distinguished Overseas Academic and Professor of Social History in the School of Social and Behavioural Sciences, Nanjing University. Prof Goodman was recognized by the PRC Jiangsu Provincial Government with a Friendship Award in 2014; and by the PRC Suzhou City Government as a Friend of Suzhou in 2019.

== Works ==
Goodman's research has focused on centre-local relations and regional development in the People's Republic of China; the political history of the Chinese Communist Party; and, more recently, on social and political change at local levels in China, most especially configurations of class, and the sociology of entrepreneurship in contemporary China. His research emphasises the historical continuities in Chinese economy and society from the 20th century to the 21st. He is the author or editor of more than four dozen books and monographs on Chinese politics and society and more than 100 academic journal articles and a similar number of academic book chapters.

Since the late 1980s Goodman has been active in promoting a provincial (or more localised) approach to understanding China, both in his own work and in workshops organised by him around that theme. Through these activities Goodman has had a major influence on the development of China studies, prompting China scholars to address the implications of the wide variation in social and economic development across the country. The academic journal Provincial China arose out of the workshops he held across China beginning in 1995 on the theme of "Reform in Provincial China."

In his research on the 'new rich' in China, Goodman's view is that local elites and power relations are strongly shaped by family ties embedded in specific localities, resulting in a wide variety of models of what it means to be middle class in different places across China. Goodman has also been involved in social-historical research into the strategies pursued by the CCP in the northern base areas of the Second Sino-Japanese War in 1937–1945. His current research examines the development of local social governance, particularly under the broad policy goal of achieving 'Common Prosperity' in China.

== Books ==
=== Books written ===
- Class and the Communist Party of China, 1978-2021: Reform and Market Socialism (with Marc Blecher, Yingjie Guo, Jean Louis Rocca, Beibei Tang) Abingdon UK: Routledge, 2022.
- Class and the Communist Party of China, 1921-1978: Revolution and Social Change (with Marc Blecher, Yingjie Guo, Jean Louis Rocca, Tony Saich) Abingdon UK: Routledge, 2021.
- Class in Contemporary China Wiley, New York, 2014. 272 pp.
- Shanxi in Reform: Everyday Life in a North China Province (Zhongguo Shanxi Fengqing) Dangdai Zhongguo chubanshe, Beijing. 2000. 103 pp. (Bilingual edition.)
- Social and Political Change in Revolutionary China: The Taihang Base Area in the War of Resistance to Japan, 1937–1945 Rowman & Littlefield, Lanham, 2000. 345 pp.
  - (Translated into Chinese as Zhongguo gemingzhongde Taihang KangRi genjudi shehui bianqian Beijing, Zhongyang wenxian chubanshe, 2003. 351 pp.
- China’s Hainan Province: Economic development and investment environment (with Feng Chongyi) University of Western Australia Press, 1995. 96 pp.
- Deng Xiaoping Cardinal, London, 1990. 172 pp.
- China without Deng (with Gerald Segal) HarperCollins, Sydney & New York, 1995. 106 pp. Translated into Chinese as Denghou jushi dayuce Shibao chuban, Taipei, 1997, 141 pp.
- Deng Xiaoping and the Chinese Revolution: a political biography Routledge, London, 1994. 209 pp. Reprinted 1996.
  - Revised edition in Chinese as Deng Xiaoping zhengzhi pingzhuan Zhonggong zhongyang dangxiao chubanshe, 1995. 230 pp. Reprinted 1996. Original translated into Chinese as Zhongguo zuihou qiangren – Deng Xiaoping de kua shiji geming Caixun chubanshe, Taipei, 1997. 285 pp.
- China’s Provincial Leaders, 1949–1985 University College Press, Cardiff, 1986. 297 pp.
- The China Challenge: Adjustment and Reform (with Martin Lockett and Gerald Segal) Royal Institute of International Affairs, Routledge & Kegan Paul, 1986. 86 pp.
  - Translated into Chinese as Zhongguode tiaozhan: diaocheng yu gaige Zhongguo Huaqiao chubanshe, Beijing, 1990.
- Centre and Province in the People's Republic of China: Sichuan and Guizhou, 1955–65 Cambridge University Press, 1986, reprinted 2009.
- Beijing Street Voices: The Poetry and Politics of China’s Democracy Movement Marion Boyars, London, 1981. 210 pp.

=== Books edited ===
- (ed) Handbook on Local Governance in China: Structures, variations, and innovations (with Ceren Ergenc) Cheltenham: Edward Elgar, 2023. 484 pp.
- (ed) China Impact: Threat Perception in the Asia-Pacific Region (with Shigeto Sonoda) Tokyo University Press, 2018. 261 pp.
- (ed) Handbook of Politics in China Cheltenham, Edward Elgar, 2015. 552 pp.
- (ed) Middle Class China: Identity and Behaviour (with Minglu Chen) Cheltenham, Edward Elgar, 2013. 204 pp.
- (ed) China's Peasants and Workers: Changing class identities (with Beatriz Carillo) Edward Elgar, Cheltenham, 2012. 164 pp.
- (ed) Twentieth Century Colonialism and China: Localities, the everyday, and the world (with Bryna Goodman ) Routledge, London, 2012. 256 pp.
- (ed) The New Rich in China: Future rulers, present lives Routledge, London, 2008. 302 pp.
- (ed) China’s Campaign to ‘Open Up the West’: National, provincial and local perspectives Cambridge University Press, 2004. 204 pp.
- (ed) China’s Communist Revolutions: Fifty Years of the People’s Republic of China (with Werner Draguhn) Routledge, London, 2002. 279 pp.
- (ed) North China at War: The social ecology of revolution, 1937–1945 (with Feng Chongyi) Rowman & Littlefield, Lanham, 2000. 236 pp.
- (ed) Towards Recovery in Pacific Asia (with Gerald Segal) Routledge, London, 2000. 148 pp.
- (ed) Huabei Kang Ri genjudi yu shehui shengtai (The Social Ecology of Base Areas in North China during the War of Resistance to Japan) (with Feng Chongyi) Dangdai Zhongguo chubanshe, Beijing, 1998. 278 pp.
- (ed) China Rising: nationalism and interdependence (with Gerald Segal) Routledge, London, 1997. 196 pp. Reprinted 2000.
- (ed) China’s Provinces in Reform: Class, community and political culture Routledge, London, 1997. 278 pp.
- (ed) The New Rich in Asia: Mobile-phones, McDonald's and Middle Class Revolution (with Richard Robison) Routledge, London, 1996. 253 pp. Reprinted 1996 (twice), 1997, 1998, 1999.
- (ed) China Deconstructs: Politics, trade and regionalism (with Gerald Segal) Routledge, London, 1994. 364 pp.
- (ed) China’s Quiet Revolution: New Interactions between State and Society (with Beverley Hooper) Longman Cheshire, Melbourne, 1994. 240 pp.
- (ed) China in the Nineties: Crisis Management and Beyond (with Gerald Segal) Oxford University Press, 1991. 226 pp.
- (ed) China and the West : Ideas and Activists Manchester University Press, 1990. 186 pp.
- (ed) China at Forty: Mid Life Crisis? (with Gerald Segal) Oxford University Press, 1989. 178 pp.
- (ed) China’s Regional Development Routledge, London, 1989. 204 pp. Reprinted by Routledge 2005 in the China: History, Philosophy, Economics reprint series of major past titles.
- (ed) Communism and Reform in East Asia Frank Cass, London, 1988. 158 pp.
- (ed) Groups and Politics in the People’s Republic of China M.E. Sharpe, New York, 1984. 218 pp.
