= Side Park =

Park in Beijing, China

- Interactive map of Side Park
- Location: Jiangtai West Road, Chaoyang District
- Area: 161,300 m^{2} (1,736,000 sq ft)
- Operator: Chaoyang District, Beijing Gardening and Greening Bureau
- Status: Open year round

Side Park (Chinese: 四得公园; pinyin: Sìdé Gōngyuán) is a public park in Beijing.

The highlights of Side Park include the scenic landscape park, elderly activity area, children's activity area, fitness and entertainment areas and fishing areas.

There is also a sporting complex, accessed from the south-east gate, with facilities including a 9 a-side all weather football pitch, two 5 a-side football fields, four tennis courts, and areas for badminton, basketball, billiards, table tennis, etc.

The park is suitable for children, providing amenities such as an inflated castle, indoor funhouse, outdoor playground, merry-go-round, football pitches, a rollerblading rink and a fishing pond.

From 2011 onwards, Side Park has been the host of the German Soccer Championship, an event organised by the Sino-German business community.

== Location ==
Side Park is just outside the north-east 4th Ring Road, near to the Airport Expressway and Dashanzi (大山子). The park is also located near Fangyuan West Road and Xiaoyun Bridge.

== Transport ==
- Jiangtaixi station on Line 12, Beijing Subway
