= Expressways of Beijing =

Overview of expressways in Beijing

Map of Expressways in Beijing

Beijing was first connected to outside areas by the Jingshi Expressway in the late 1980s and early 1990s. Now, many expressways connect Beijing with plans for future development.

== History ==
When the Airport Expressway and the Jingjintang Expressway opened, Beijing was already gripped by 'expressway fever'. In the far eastern part of the town, the less popular Jingha Expressway existed until the construction of the Jingtong Expressway in the mid-1990s, which brought more recognition to the Jingha Expressway. However, it is still too far from central Beijing to be considered a key expressway.

By the People's Republic of China's 50th anniversary, more expressways were being built in Beijing. The Badaling Expressway, Jingshen Expressway, and in 2000, the Jingkai Expressway were constructed. Beijing then had eight expressways.

In 2001, the Jingcheng Expressway was built. The northeastern and southeastern parts were ready to accommodate two more expressways (the Jingping/Jingji and Northern Jingji Expressways, respectively).

In 2004, the municipal government publicly announced a plan to complete up to 890 km (550 mi) of expressways (277 km (172 mi) by 2006). By 2006, the 6th Ring Road would be completed, and in the same year, a major batch of expressways would also be finished.

Currently, there are a total of 15 main expressways around Beijing including the Jingping/Jingji, Northern Jingjin, Southern Jingjin, 2nd Airport Expressway, Northern Airport Expressway, Litian Expressway, and the nine existing expressways. Out of these, 11 radiate from the city centre of Beijing, as the majority of residents tend to live farther away from the city centre.

=== 2005 plan ===
In early January 2005, mainland authorities revealed a plan for seven national expressways originating from Beijing. One of these included an expressway that led straight to Taiwan.

The expressways include:

- Beijing - Shanghai (Jinghu Expressway)
- Beijing - Taipei
- Beijing - Kunming
- Beijing - Hong Kong/Macau
- Beijing - Lhasa
- Beijing - Urumqi
- Beijing - Harbin

After the 'Three Links' came into effect, the projected 85,000 km (53,000 mi) of mainland expressways will have a connection, possibly by tunnel, to Taiwan and all expressways on the island.

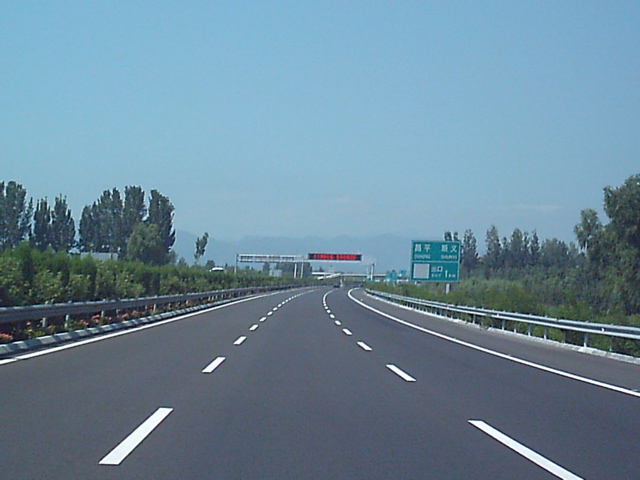
The Jingcheng Expressway near Gaoliying

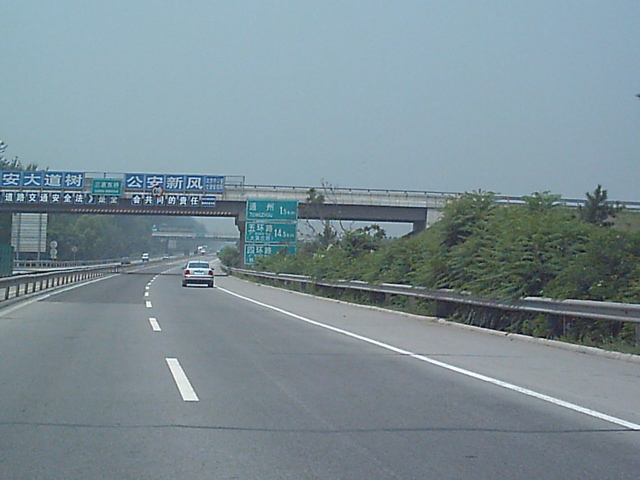
The Jingha Expressway

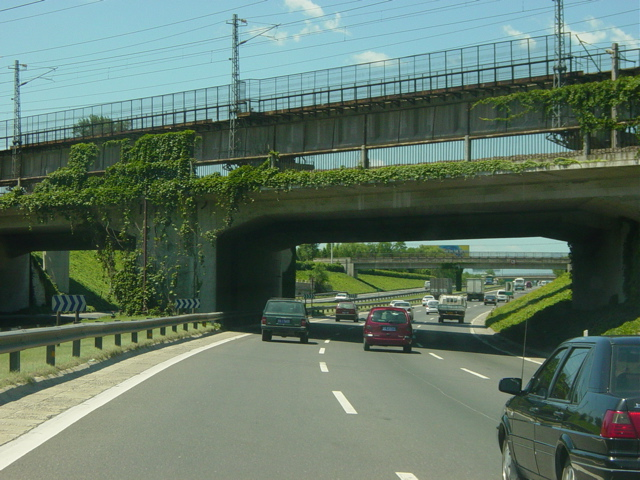
The Jingshi Expressway

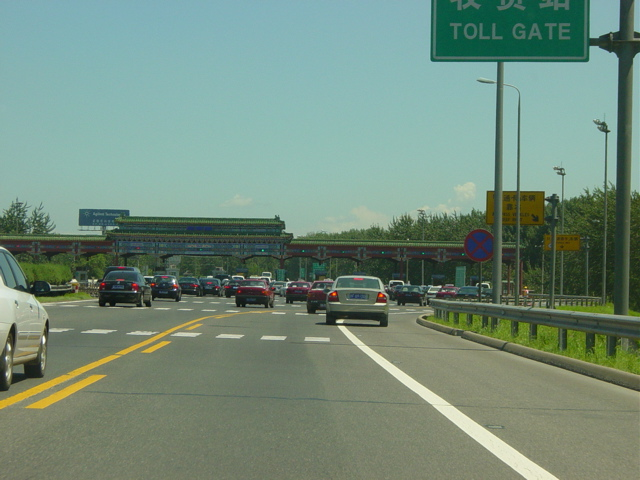
The Airport Expressway near the toll gate

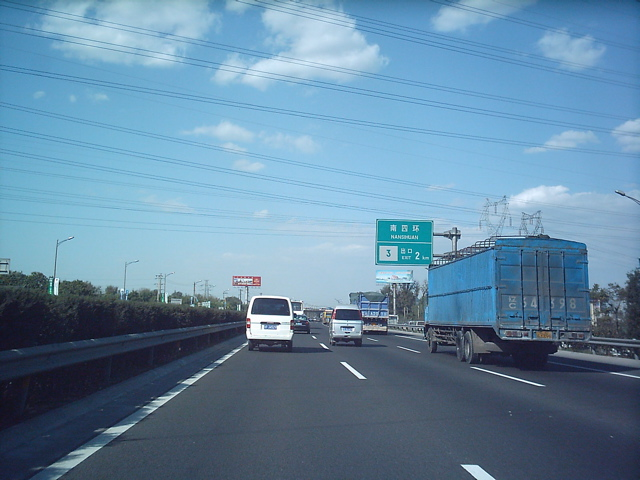
The Jingkai Expressway near the Southern 4th Ring Road

== List of routes ==
=== National-level expressways ===
Name and number	Abbreviated name	Name in simplified Chinese	Termini in Beijing		Length (Beijing section)	Status
G1 (Beijing–Harbin Expressway)	Jingha Expressway	京哈高速	4th Ring Road	Hebei border	39.9 km (24.8 mi)	Fully completed
G0121 (Beijing–Qinhuangdao Expressway)	Jingqin Expressway	京秦高速	G4501 (6th Ring Road)	Hebei border	19 km (12 mi)	Partially complete
G2 (Beijing–Shanghai Expressway, Jingjintang Expressway)	Jinghu Expressway, Jingtang Expressway	京沪高速公路, 京津塘高速公路	3rd Ring Road	Hebei border	35 km (22 mi)	Fully completed
G3 (Beijing–Taipei Expressway)	Jingtai Expressway	京台高速公路	Beijing S50 (5th Ring Road)	Hebei border	26.6 km (16.5 mi)	Fully completed
G4 (Beijing–Hong Kong and Macau Expressway)	Jinggang'ao Expressway	京港澳高速公路	3rd Ring Road	Hebei border	45.6 km (28.3 mi)	Fully completed
G5 (Beijing–Kunming Expressway)	Jingkun Expressway	京昆高速公路	G4501 (6th Ring Road)	Hebei border	60 km (37 mi)	Fully completed
G6 (Beijing–Lhasa Expressway, Badaling Expressway)	Jingzang Expressway, Jingchang Expressway	京藏高速, 八达岭高速公路	3rd Ring Road	Hebei border	68.4 km (42.5 mi)	Fully completed
G7 (Beijing–Ürümqi Expressway)	Jingxin Expressway	京新高速公路	Beijing S50 (5th Ring Road)	Hebei border	90.4 km (56.2 mi)	Partially complete
G45 (Daqing–Guangzhou Expressway)	Daguang Expressway	大广高速公路	Hebei border	Hebei border	217.8 km (135.3 mi)	Fully completed
G4501 (6th Ring Road)		六环路			188.6 km (117.2 mi)	Fully completed
G95 (Capital Area Loop Expressway)	7th Ring Road	首都地区环线高速公路			88 km (55 mi)	Partially complete

=== Provincial-level expressways ===
Name and number	Abbreviated name	Name in simplified Chinese	Termini in Beijing		Length (Beijing section)	Status
Beijing S11 (Beijing–Chengde Expressway)	Jingcheng Expressway	京承高速公路			131.9 km (82.0 mi)	Fully completed
Beijing S12 (Airport Expressway)		机场高速公路	3rd Ring Road	Beijing Capital International Airport	20.8 km (12.9 mi)	Fully completed
Beijing S15 (Beijing–Tianjin Expressway)	Jingjin Expressway	京津高速	Beijing S50 (5th Ring Road)	Tianjin S30 (Jingjin Expressway)		Fully completed
Beijing S26 (Changping–Pinggu Expressway)	Changgu Expressway	昌谷高速			97 km (60 mi)	Proposed
Beijing S28 (Northern Airport Expressway)	Northern Airport Line	机场北线高速	G45 (Daqing–Guangzhou Expressway)	Beijing Capital International Airport	11.3 km (7.0 mi)	Fully completed
Beijing S32 (Beijing–Pinggu Expressway)	Jingping Expressway	京平高速公路	Beijing S11 (Beijing–Chengde Expressway)	Tianjin S1 (Tianjin–Ji Expressway)	72.83 km (45.25 mi)	Fully completed
Beijing S35 (Beijing–Miyun Expressway)	Jingmi Expressway	京密高速公路	G101 (China National Highway 101)	G101 (China National Highway 101)	16.3 km (10.1 mi) (Proposed 53.7 km (33.4 mi))	Partially complete
Beijing S41 (Miyun–Caiyu Expressway)	Micai Expressway	密采高速			80 km (50 mi)	Proposed
Beijing S46 (Jingtong-Jingha Connecting Line)	Jingfu Road	京抚路			3.2 km (2.0 mi)	Fully completed
Beijing S50 (5th Ring Road)		五环路			98.8 km (61.4 mi)	Fully completed
Beijing S51 (2nd Airport Expressway)		机场二高速	Beijing S50 (5th Ring Road)	Beijing Capital International Airport	28 km (17 mi)	Fully completed
Beijing S63 (Jingli Expressway)						
Beijing S66 (Jingkun Connecting Line)		京昆联络线	Beijing S50 (5th Ring Road)	G5 (Beijing–Kunming Expressway)	15.6 km (9.7 mi)	Partially complete
Beijing S76 (Yanshan–Caiyu Expressway)	Yancai Expressway	燕采高速			57 km (35 mi)	Proposed
Beijing S80 (Miyun–Zhuozhou Expressway)	Mizhuo Expressway	密涿高速			79 km (49 mi)	Partially complete
Beijing S86 (Yunling–Caiyu Expressway)	Yuncai Expressway	云采高速			97.7 km (60.7 mi)	Proposed

== See also ==
- China National Highways
- Expressways of China
