= Overseas Chinese History Museum of China =

National-level museum in China

- Established: 2014
- Location: North Xiaojie in Dongzhimen, Dongcheng District, Beijing
- Type: national-level museum
- Website: Official Website

The Overseas Chinese History Museum of China (Chinese: 中国华侨历史博物馆) is a national-level museum in Beijing that showcases the history of overseas Chinese. Located at North Xiaojie in Dongzhimen, Dongcheng District in Beijing, it is under the control of the All-China Federation of Returned Overseas Chinese (ACFROC).

Tan Kah Kee, who served as ACFROC's first chairman, gave ¥500,000 in 1960 to build the museum. Staff began collecting artifacts for the museum in 2005. The museum opened on 21 October 2014, which marked 140 years after Tan's birth. Its floor area occupies 12,765 m^{2} (137,400 sq ft) and it is 5 m (16 ft) high with five levels (two underground and three above ground). When it opened, the museum has a permanent exhibit and three time-limited exhibits. The permanent one had more than 800 artifacts and almost a thousand photos.
