= Sanyuanqiao =

Sanyuanqiao may refer to:

- Sanyuan Bridge, overpass in Beijing, China
- Sanyuanqiao Station, on Beijing Subway, China
