= All-China Federation of Returned Overseas Chinese =

CCP united front people's organization

- 中华全国归国华侨联合会
- Logo of the All-China Federation of Returned Overseas Chinese
- Formation: June 1956; 69 years ago
- Type: People's organization
- Headquarters: 3 Fuxing Road, Haidian District, Beijing
- President: Wan Lijun
- Parent organization: United Front Work Department
- Affiliations: Chinese People's Political Consultative Conference
- Website: www.chinaql.org

All-China Federation of Returned Overseas Chinese
- Simplified Chinese: 中华全国归国华侨联合会
- Traditional Chinese: 中華全國歸國華僑聯合會
Transcriptions
Standard Mandarin
- Hanyu Pinyin: Zhōnghuá Quánguó Guīguó Huáqiáo Liánhéhuì

Abbreviation
- Simplified Chinese: 中国侨联
- Traditional Chinese: 中國僑聯
Transcriptions
Standard Mandarin
- Hanyu Pinyin: Zhōngguó Qiáolián

Alternate abbreviation
- Simplified Chinese: 全国侨联
- Traditional Chinese: 全國僑聯
Transcriptions
Standard Mandarin
- Hanyu Pinyin: Quánguó Qiáolián

The All-China Federation of Returned Overseas Chinese (ACFROC) is a people's organization of the Chinese Communist Party (CCP) to influence overseas Chinese. Part of the united front, ACFROC has 27 seats on the national committee of the Chinese People's Political Consultative Conference.

== History ==
In July 1937, the "Office for Overseas Chinese in Yan'an" was established, who on 5 September 1940 organized the first "Yan'an Overseas Chinese Congress". At the congress, the "Yan'an Overseas Chinese National Salvation Association" was created, which on 12 March 1946 changed its name to "Yan'an Overseas Chinese Association", and again in 1948 to "China Federation of Returned Overseas Chinese from Liberated Areas".

In June 1956, following a decree from the Overseas Chinese Affairs Office, the "Preparatory Committee of the All-China Federation of Returned Overseas Chinese" was created, and later on 12 October, the "All-China Federation of Returned Overseas Chinese" was formed in Beijing.

On 21 March 2018, the 19th Central Committee of the Chinese Communist Party issued a plan on deepening the reform of the party and state institutions, stating that the responsibility of maintaining relations with overseas Chinese individuals and associations are to be transferred from the State Council Overseas Chinese Affairs Office to the ACFROC.

In February 2025, Philippine police arrested four Chinese nationals affiliated with ACFROC-associated organizations in the Philippines that made illegal cash donations to Tarlac City and its police force.

== Organization ==
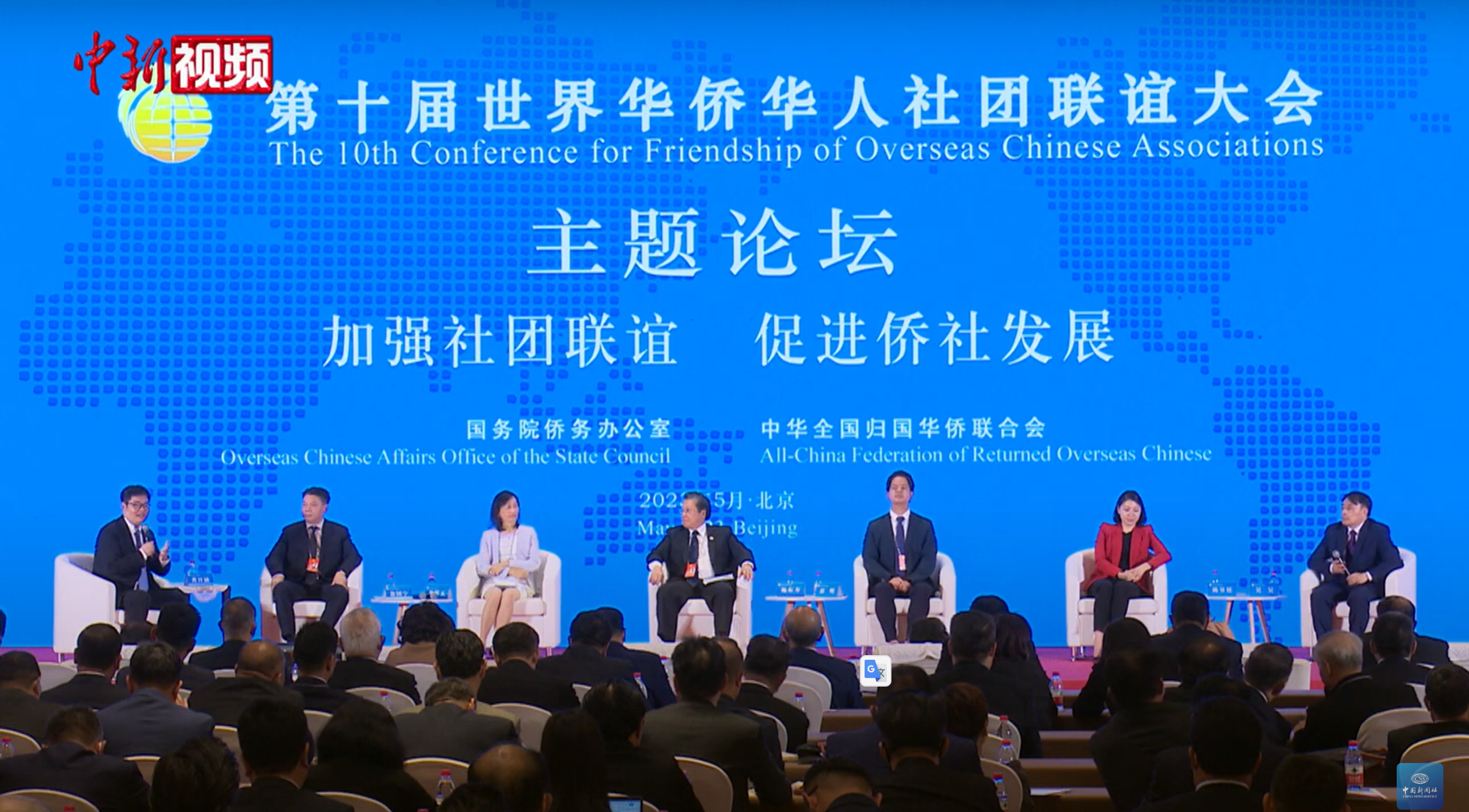
the 10th Conference for Friendship of Overseas Chinese Associations in 2023 in Beijing

The All-China Federation of Returned Overseas Chinese maintains the following institutions:

Internal Departments:

- General Office
- Information & Communication Department
- Friendship & Liaison Department
- Economic & Technology Department
- Cultural Exchange Department
- Rights Protection Department
- Grassroots Development Department
- Organization & Personnel Department (Party Committee Office)

Directly affiliated Public Institutions:

- Administrative Services Center
- China Overseas Chinese Research Institute (China Overseas Chinese Historical Society)
- Overseas Chinese History Museum of China
- Hai Nei Yu Hai Wai Magazine
- ACFROC Public Welfare Management & Services Center (including China Overseas Chinese Public Welfare Foundation)
- ACFROC Cadre Training Center

Directly affiliated Enterprises:

- China Enterprise Management Consulting Company
- Chinese Overseas Publishing House

Supervised Social Organizations:

- Chinese Overseas Businessmen's Association
- Chinese Overseas Chinese Photographic Society
- Chinese Overseas Chinese International Cultural Exchange Promotion Association
- China Overseas Chinese Historical Society

== Leading Groups ==
=== Presidents ===
1. Tan Kah Kee (October 1956 – August 1961)
2. Zhuang Xiquan (December 1978 – April 1984)
3. Zhang Guoji (April 1984 – December 1989)
4. Zhuang Yanlin (December 1989 – June 1994)
5. Yang Taifang (June 1994 – July 1999)
6. Lin Zhaoshu (July 1999 – January 2008)
7. Lin Jun (January 2008 – June 2017)
8. Wan Lijun (June 2017 – Incumbent)

== See also ==
- People's organization
- United front (China)
