= Lin Jun (politician) =

Chinese politician

- 林军

President of the Central Committee of the All-China Federation of Returned Overseas Chinese
- In office January 2008 – June 2017
- Preceded by: Lin Zhaoshu
- Succeeded by: Wan Lijun

Personal details
- Born: July 1949 (age 76) Dutch East Indies
- Party: Chinese Communist Party

Chinese name
- Simplified Chinese: 林军
- Traditional Chinese: 林軍
Transcriptions
Standard Mandarin
- Hanyu Pinyin: Lín Jūn

Lin Jun (Chinese: 林军; born July 1949) is a Chinese politician who served as president of the Central Committee of the All-China Federation of Returned Overseas Chinese from 2008 to 2017.

He was a representative of the 16th and 17th National Congress of the Chinese Communist Party. He was an alternate of the 17th Central Committee of the Chinese Communist Party and a member of the 18th Central Committee of the Chinese Communist Party.

== Biography ==
Lin was born in Dutch East Indies (now Indonesia) in July 1949, while his ancestral home in Anxi County, Fujian, China.

Lin Jun previously held the positions of Director-General and Deputy Secretary-General of the General Office of the State Planning Commission, General Manager and Party Secretary of the China Grain Reserves Corporation, and Chairman of the All-China Federation of Returned Overseas Chinese.

In July 2004, he was chosen vice chairman of the 7th All-China Federation of Returned Overseas Chinese (ACFROC). In April 2007, he was designated as Party Secretary of ACFROC. In January 2008, he was elected chairman of the 7th ACFROC, and in July 2009, he was re-elected as chairman of the 8th ACFROC. On the morning of December 5, 2013, during the 9th National Committee of ACFROC convened in Beijing, Lin Jun was re-elected as chairman.

On June 9, 2017, Lin Jun resigned as chairman of the All-China Federation of Returned Overseas Chinese and was thereafter appointed as an advisor to the federation.

Government offices
Preceded by Lin Zhaoshu	President of the Central Committee of the All-China Federation of Returned Overseas Chinese; 2008–2017	Succeeded by Wan Lijun
