= Wan Lijun =

Chinese chemist and academic (born 1957)

Wan Lijun (Chinese: 万立骏, born July 1957) is a Chinese chemist, specializing in electrochemistry and surface science. He is an academician of the Chinese Academy of Sciences and a former president of the University of Science and Technology of China.

== Career ==
Wan graduated with a B.S. in engineering from Dalian University of Technology in 1982 and received his PhD degree at Tohoku University in 1996. He has been a professor at Institute of Chemistry, Chinese Academy of Sciences (ICCAS) since 1999, and was the director of ICCAS from 2004 to 2013. Afterwards, he directed the Beijing National Laboratory for Molecular Sciences and the Key Laboratory of Molecular Nanostructure and Nanotechnology, CAS. From 2015 to 2017, Wan was the president of the University of Science and Technology of China.

Wan improved the stability and resolution of electrochemical scanning tunneling microscope (ECTSM) devices, and resolved a number of related problems, such as the STM imaging mechanisms of various types of chiral molecules. He also designed a series of high-performance electrode materials based on micro/nano composite structures.

Wan was elected as an academician of the Chinese Academy of Sciences in 2009. He is the president of the All-China Federation of Returned Overseas Chinese since 2017.

During the 20th National Congress of the Communist Party, Wan was elected as a member of the 20th Central Committee.

== Awards ==
- HLHL Science and Technology Achievement Award (2014)
- Chemistry Award of TWAS (2009)
- 2nd-Class Natural Science Award of China (2007)

Educational offices
Preceded by Hou Jianguo	Presidents of the University of Science and Technology of China; March 2015 - June 2017	Succeeded by Bao Xinhe
