= Lin Jun (engineer) =

Chinese engineer (born 1954)

- 林君
- Born: July 1954 (age 72); Tonghua, Jilin, China
- Education: Jilin University
- Scientific career
- Fields: Geoscience instruments and information technology
- Workplaces: Jilin University

Lin Jun (Chinese: 林君; pinyin: Lín Jūn; born July 1954) is a Chinese engineer who is a professor, doctoral supervisor and dean of the College of Instrumentation and Electrical Engineering at Jilin University. He is a member of the China Instrument and Control Society (CIS), Chinese Geophysical Society (CGS), Chinese Institute of Electronics (CIE), Institute of Electrical and Electronics Engineers (IEEE), and Society of Exploration Geophysicists (SEG).

== Biography ==
Lin was born in Tonghua, Jilin, in July 1954. After the resumption of National College Entrance Examination, he matriculated at Changchun Institute of Geology (now Jilin University), where he received his bachelor's degree in 1982 and his master's degree in 1987 both in exploration geophysics. After graduation, he taught at the university, where he was promoted to associate professor in 1991 and to full professor in 1992. He was a visiting scholar and then visiting professor at the University of Leicester from October 1989 to November 1991. He was also a senior visiting scholar at the University of Arizona from November 1996 to May 1997. In April 2000 he appointed dean of the School of Information Science and Technology. After this office was terminated in May 2001, he became executive vice-dean of the College of Electronic Science and Engineering, serving until December 2004. He has been dean of the College of Instrumentation and Electrical Engineering since April 2005.

== Honours and awards ==
- 2006 Science and Technology Progress Award of the Ministry of Education (Second Class)
- 2016 State Science and Technology Progress Award (Second Class)
- October 26, 2018 Li Siguang Geological Science Award
- November 22, 2019 Member of the Chinese Academy of Engineering (CAE)
