= Dashanzi =

Location in Beijing, China

Coordinates: 39.98°N 116.49°E

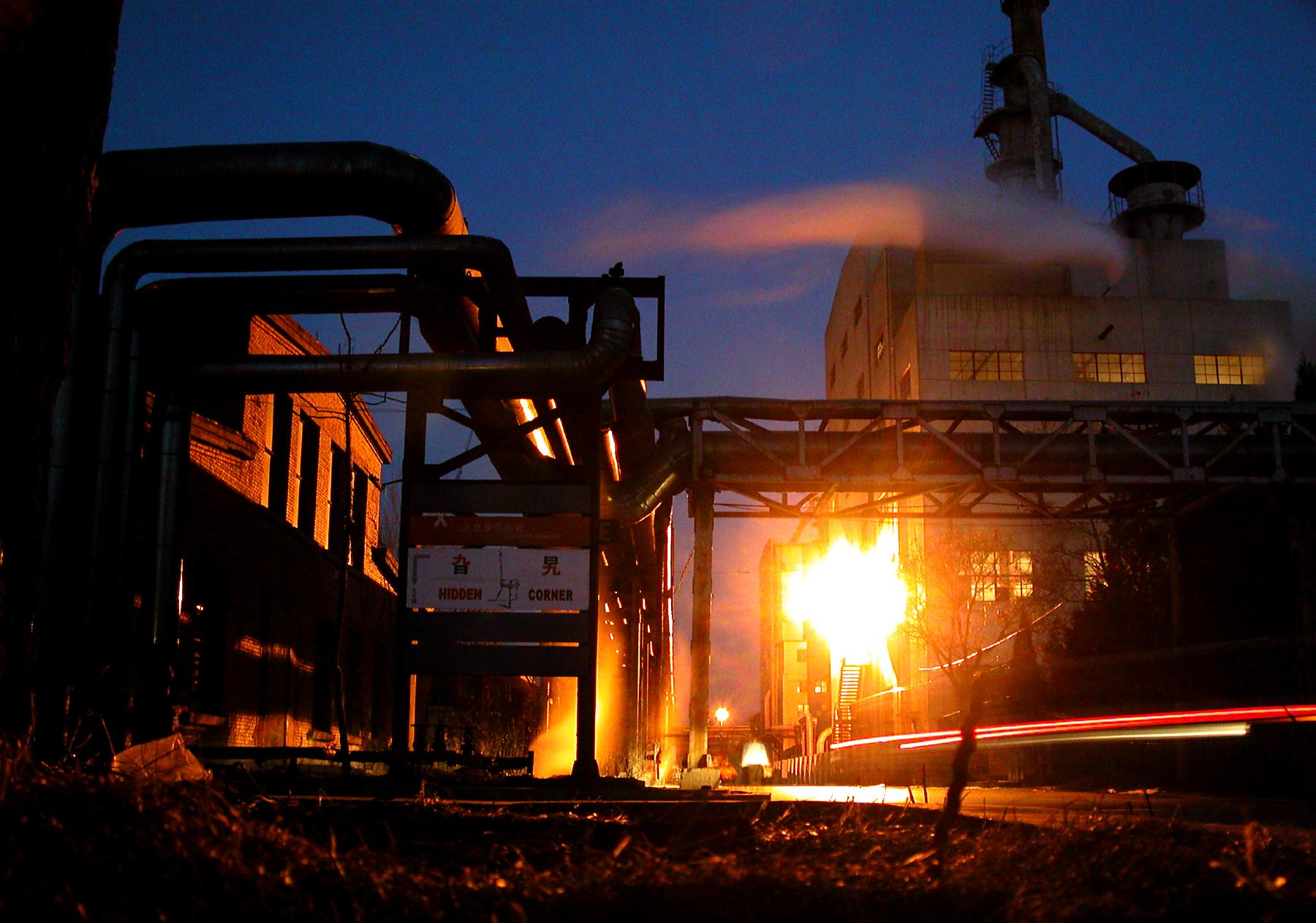
Factory in Dashanzi at night

Dashanzi (大山子, Pinyin: Dàshānzi) is a 1 square kilometer area in Chaoyang district of Beijing, northeast of the city center. It lies along the Airport Expressway between the 4th and 5th Ring Roads, south of the Dashanzi flyover (大山子桥, Pinyin: Dàshānzi Qiáo) and opposite Wangjing.

Most of the area is made up of an industrial park. One of its most notable features is the 798 Art District also known as Dashanzi Art Zone, one of the most cosmopolitan areas of Beijing.
