= Contemporary China Publishing House =

State publisher in China

Contemporary China Publishing House (Chinese: 当代中国出版社), or Contemporary China Press, is a Chinese publisher. Founded in January 1991, it publishes books about modern Chinese people and modern Chinese history. The publisher is associated with the Institute of Contemporary China Studies.

It published the book A Brief History of the People's Republic of China (1949–2019) (Chinese: 中华人民共和国简史（1949~2019）), which sold over one million copies.
