= Chinese Overseas Publishing House =

Chinese state publisher

The Chinese Overseas Publishing House (Chinese: 中国华侨出版社) is a Chinese publisher. Established in January 1989, it is affiliated with the All-China Federation of Returned Overseas Chinese. The publisher is the only one in China focused on people who are Overseas Chinese.
