= Sanyuan Bridge =

Major overpass on the northeastern stretch of 3rd Ring Road, Beijing, China

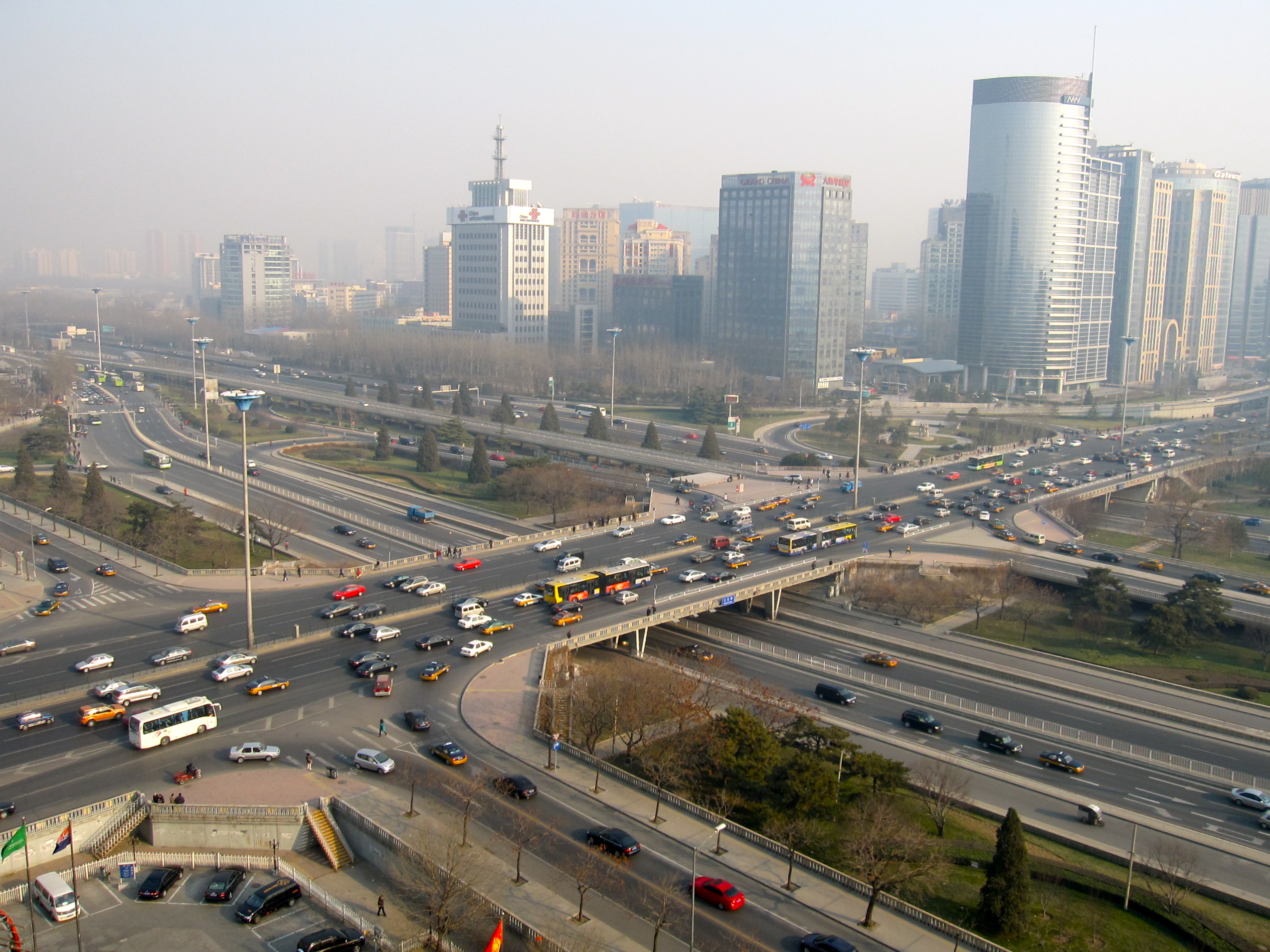
Sanyuan Bridge

Sanyuan Bridge, or Sanyuanqiao (simplified Chinese: 三元桥; traditional Chinese: 三元橋; pinyin: Sānyuán Qiáo) is a major overpass on the northeastern stretch of Beijing's 3rd Ring Road. It was opened in 1984.

The overpass links three major passageways in Beijing and the complex structure made it a speciality on its own in its first days. The Capital Airport Expressway, Jingmi Road (China National Highway 101) and the 3rd Ring Road were interlinked.

Originally, the Airport Expressway's position was the old airport road. Today, the old airport road has become a service, or auxiliary road, to the current Airport Expressway.

The simple complexity of the overpass was tempting to tamper with, but in the 1990s, the temptation was too much (caused by excess traffic): another portion of a flyover was built for vehicles heading from the eastern 3rd Ring Road to interlink directly with the Airport Expressway.

In 2015, the original bridge was replaced in 43 hours. The replacement was constructed as a single prefabricated piece and installed in place of the original.

== Transport ==
There is a Beijing Subway station. Line 10, Line 12 and the Capital Airport Express stop at Sanyuan Qiao station.

== See also ==
- List of bridges in China
- Chinese architecture
