= 2nd Airport Expressway =

Toll expressway in Beijing, China

2nd Airport Expressway

Route information
- Length: 11.5 km (7.1 mi)
- Existed: 2008–present

Major junctions
- From: Yaojiayuan Road in Chaoyang District, Beijing
- To: Terminal 3 at Beijing Capital International Airport

Location
- Country: China
- Province: Beijing

Highway system
- Transport in China
| ← Beijing S50 | → Beijing S66 |

The Capital Airport 2nd Expressway (Chinese: 首都机场第二高速公路), officially numbered S51, is a toll expressway that connects eastern Beijing with Terminal 3 of Beijing Capital International Airport. It opened on February 29, 2008, just prior to the 2008 Beijing Olympics. It runs for 11.5 km from Yaojiayuan Road in Chaoyang District to Terminal 3. It was built to serve the Terminal 3, and to reduce pressure of Capital Airport Expressway, which has been heavily congested.
