= Airport Expressway (Beijing) =

Expressway linking Beijing Capital International Airport with central Beijing, China

Airport Expressway

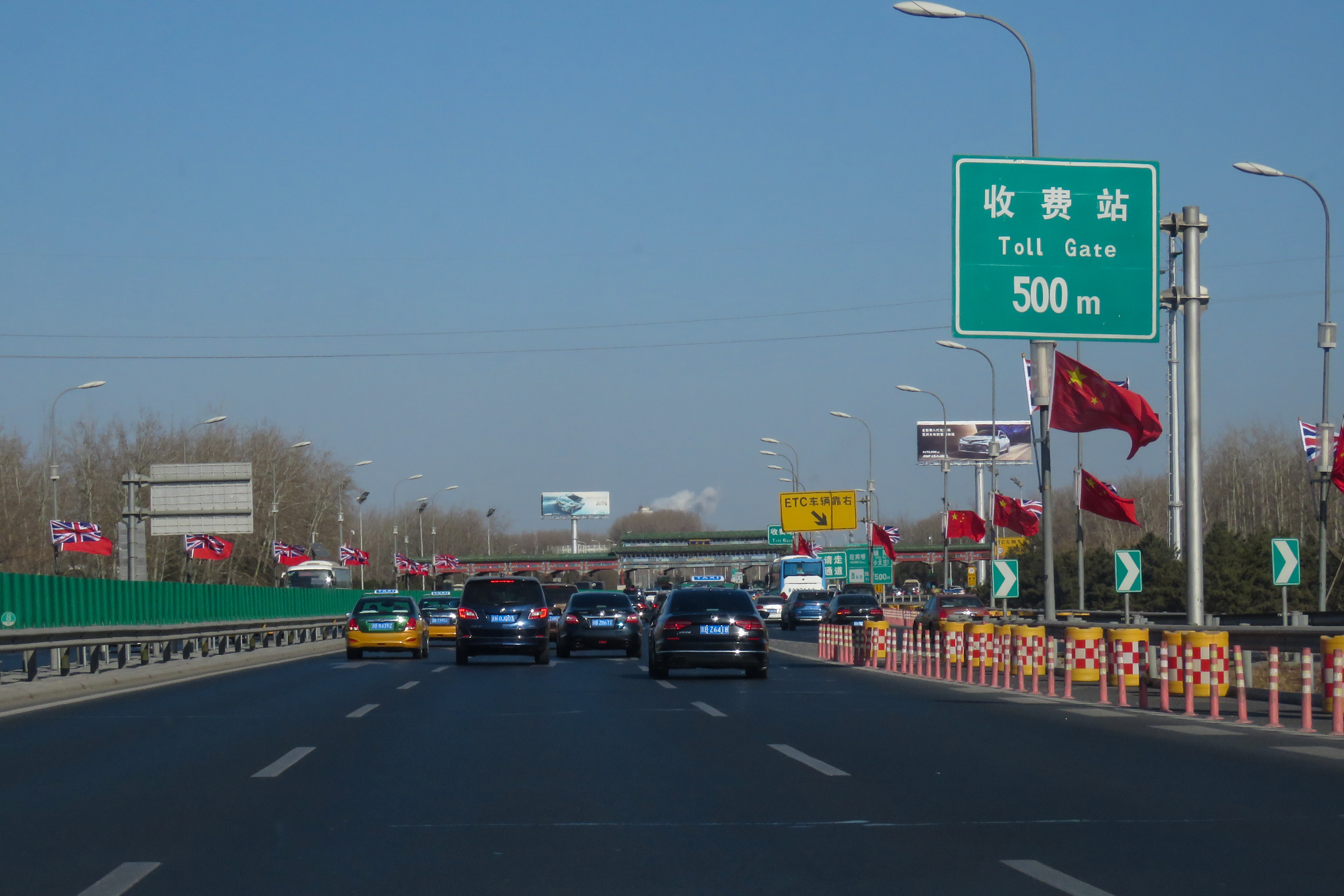
- The Airport Expressway near Tianzhu Toll Plaza in January 2018

Route information
- Length: 19 km (12 mi)
- Existed: 1993–present

Major junctions
- Southwest end: Sanyuan Bridge
- Northeast end: Beijing Capital International Airport

Location
- Country: China
- Province: Beijing

Highway system
- Transport in China
← Beijing S11	→ Beijing S15

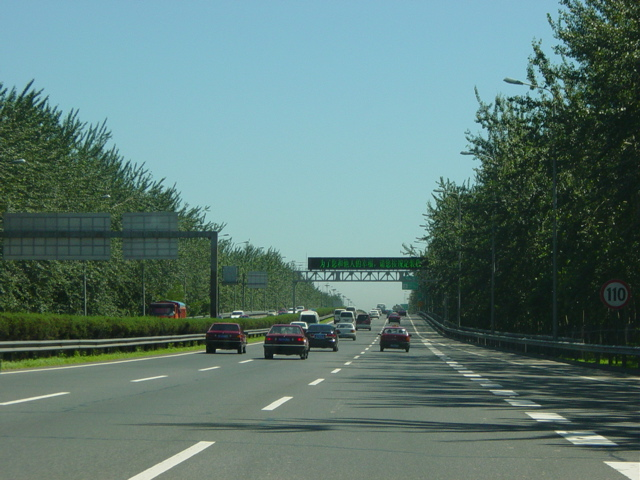
Airport Expressway (heading towards the airport, July 2004 image)

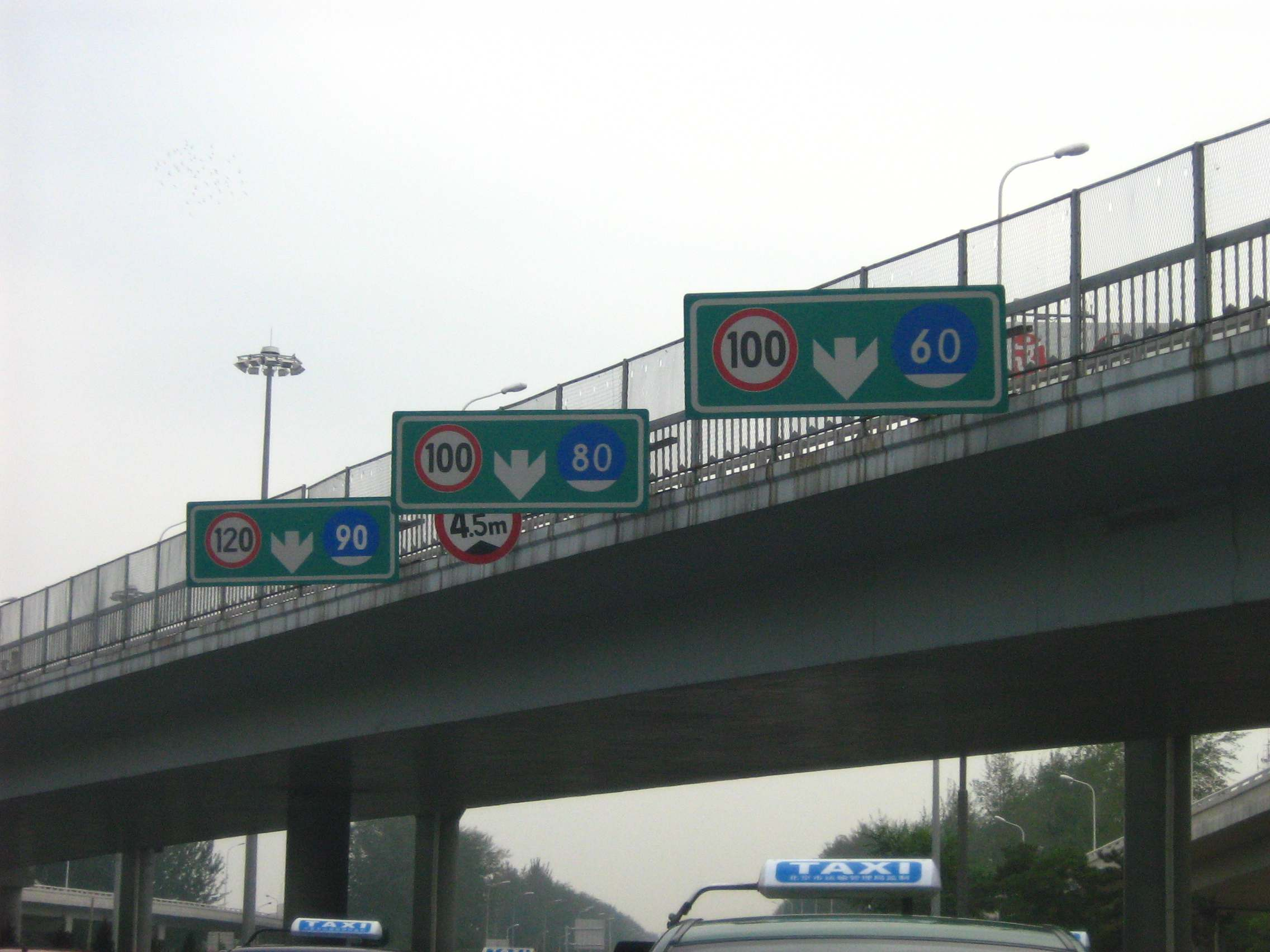
Speed limit signs on the Airport Expressway

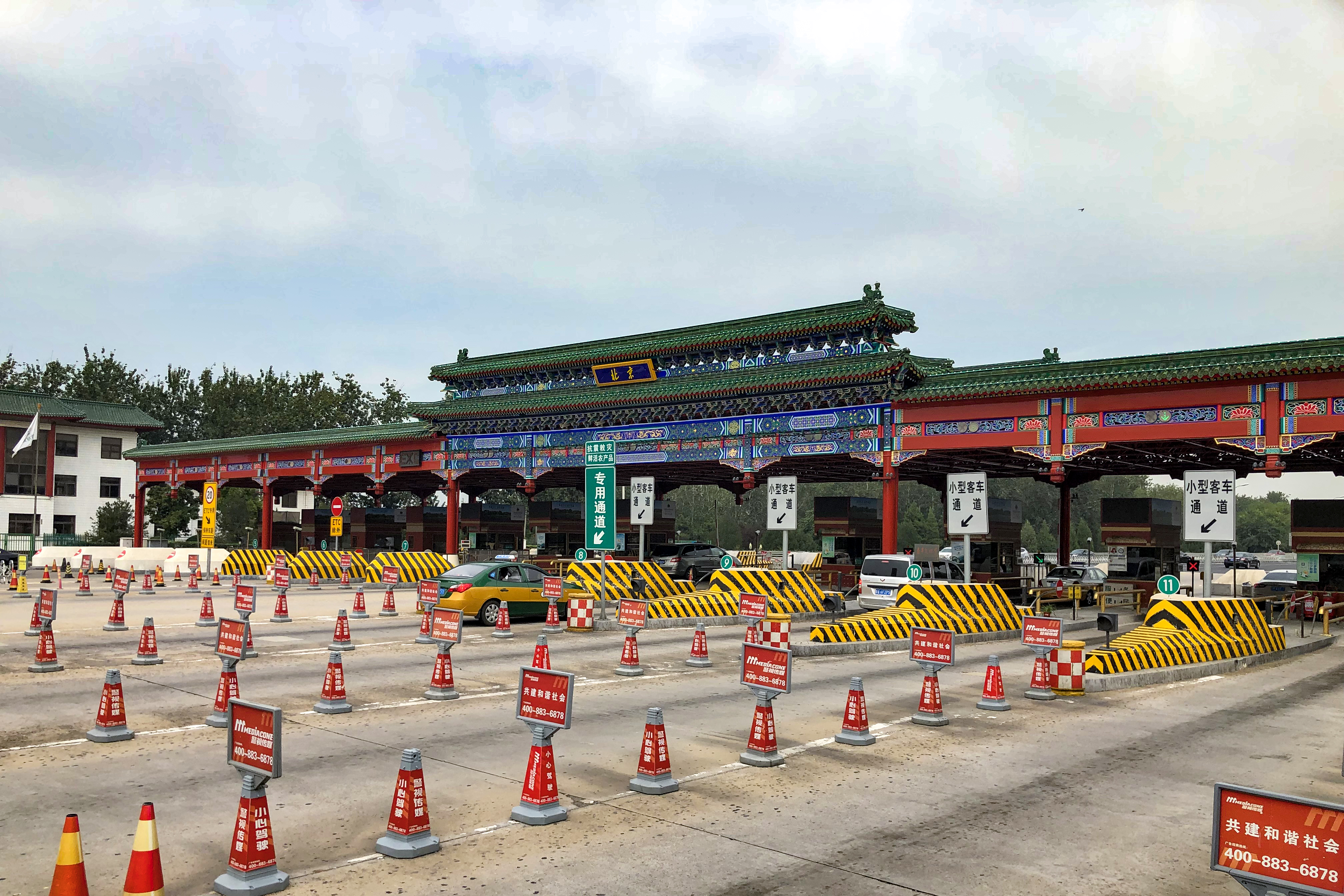
The Airport Expressway Toll Gate at Xiaotianzhu

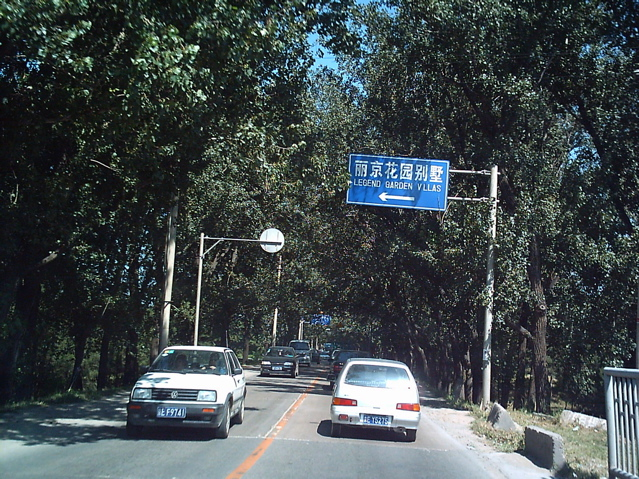
Old Airport Road (August 2004 image)

The Capital Airport Expressway (Chinese: 首都机场高速公路; pinyin: Shǒudū Jīchǎng Gāosù Gōnglù), officially the S12, is a controlled-access highway in Beijing, China, which links central Beijing to the Beijing Capital International Airport. It is just under 20 km in length.

Opened in 1993, the expressway links Sanyuan Bridge (Sanyuanqiao) on the northeastern 3rd Ring Road to Beijing Airport. Another expressway, the 2nd Airport Expressway, was built in 2008 prior to the Beijing Olympics to serve traffic from the city to the airport.

In August 2026, Beijing's transport commission announced that renovation of the expressway would start on August 21, 2026 and finish by the end of December. Works include resurfacing, adjusting lanes, removing railway bottleneck, adding a smart system with 83 sensors, and upgrading monitoring and communications systems.

== Route ==
The Airport Expressway runs entirely within the confines of the municipality of Beijing.

Basic Route: Beijing (Sanyuan Bridge - Siyuan Bridge - Beigao - Xiaotianzhu - Beijing Capital International Airport)

== History ==
The expressway opened on September 14, 1993, following a year-long construction effort which began on July 2, 1992. Previously, all traffic used the old Airport Road (G101), which was tested to the limit in the early 1990s.

This expressway has slashed driving time to the airport from the previous hour (using the old airport road) to just around 15 minutes. It is convenient and traffic is usually smooth.

=== Extension into the 2nd Ring Road ===
A 2.5 km stretch of expressway links Sanyuan Bridge on the 3rd Ring Road to the area between Dongzhimen and Xiaojie Bridge (小街桥) on the 2nd Ring Road. Construction started in 2004; it was finished in 2006.

== Alternate routes ==
Further approach routes to the airport were built in the first decade of the 21st century. The Northern Airport Line (机场北线), completed between 2005 and 2006, connected the Jingcheng Expressway with the northern part of the airport, to form a northern approach route. The route commences at Lutong, just over halfway between the 5th Ring Road and the 6th Ring Road, on the Jingcheng Expressway. In 2008, another route, the Capital Airport 2nd Expressway, was built between the eastern 5th Ring Road and the airport in time for the Beijing Olympics. Both routes have significantly alleviated traffic to the airport from the city proper.

== Road conditions ==
=== Speed limit ===
Leftmost lane: minimum 100 km/h, maximum 120 km/h. Other lanes: minimum 60 – 80 km/h, maximum 100 km/h.

=== Tolls ===
The toll collection on the Airport Expressway has a contentious history. Construction was funded by the government using a bank loan in 1993, and residents began to dispute the rationale for the toll collection several years after the road was completed, doubting that the loan was paid off and that most of the revenue was actually used to pay back the loan. Despite these inquiries and complaints, the local government continued to collect tolls. The toll collection rights were eventually sold to a public corporation, the Capital Development Corporation, and the time of toll collection was lengthened by 30 years. The central government's general accounting office investigated and found that in the 14-year period (up to 2005), the total toll revenue was over 3 billion yuan; this was much higher than the original investment amount, 1.2 billion yuan. Under pressure, the local government lowered the toll from 15 to 10 yuan.

CNY 0.5/km as of 5th Ring Road intersection for sections south of the toll gate. Entire stretch from Sanyuanqiao to Beijing Capital International Airport costs CNY 5 (price for small passenger cars). As of June 2011, the Airport Express is free of charge into the city, but retains the CNY 5 fare toward the airport.
Note: For frequent users, a sensor-style Express Transit Card is available.

=== Lanes ===
6 lanes (3 up, 3 down) uniformly.

=== Traffic ===
Good during the day. Mild traffic jams during rush hour, mostly in the southern section of the road near Beijing.

== Major exits ==
NE 2nd Ring Road, NE 3rd Ring Road, NE 4th Ring Road, Dashanzi, NE 5th Ring Road, Beigao, Xiaotianzhu, Beijing Capital International Airport

== Service areas ==
None on the expressway. The Weigou exit has a gas station close to it (on the way back to Beijing).

== Connections ==
Ring roads of Beijing: Connects with the NE 2nd Ring Road between Dongzhimen and Xiaojie Bridge (小街桥), NE 3rd Ring Road at Sanyuan Bridge, the NE 4th Ring Road at Siyuan Bridge, and the NE 5th Ring Road at Wuyuan Bridge.

== List of exits ==
Listed are exits heading northeast as of Beijing (2nd Ring Road)
Symbols: ↗ = exit, ⇆ = main interchange; → = only when heading for the airport; ← = only when heading for central Beijing; ↘ = exit only; ¥ = central toll gate

- ⇆ 1: (Interchange with 3rd Ring Road) 3rd Ring Road (Sanhuanlu)
- ⇆ 2: (↘ if ←) (Interchange with 4th Ring Road) 4th Ring Road (Sihuanlu)
- ↗ 3: Dashanzi
- ⇆ 4: (↘ if ←) (Interchange with 5th Ring Road) 5th Ring Road
- ⇆ 5: (Interchange with China National Highway 101) Beigao, Shunyi
- ↗ 6: Weigou
- ↗ 7: Yanglin Road
- ¥ Xiaotianzhu
- ↗ 8: (→) Xiaotianzhu Road / (←) Shunyi, Tongzhou
- ↗ (→, ↘) South Apron (to Terminal 3)
- Beijing Capital International Airport (Terminals 1 and 2)

== See also ==
- China National Highways
- Expressways of Beijing
- Expressways of China
