= China National Highway 101 =

Road in China

National Highway 101
- 101国道

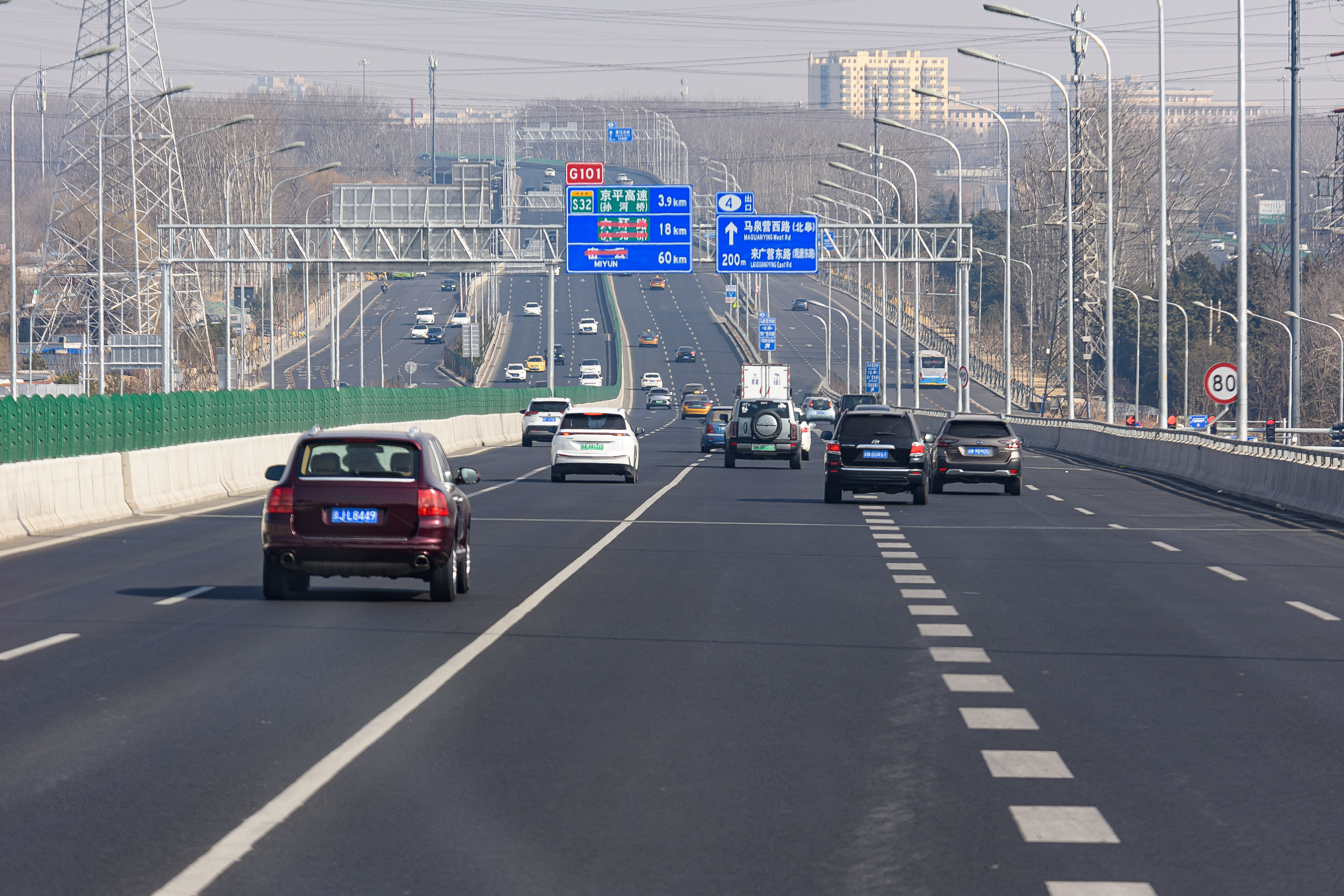
- China National Highway 101 at Dongxindian, Beijing

Route information
- Length: 1,969 km (1,223 mi)

Major junctions
- From: Dongzhimen, Beijing
- To: Shenyang, Liaoning

Location
- Country: China
- Provinces: Beijing, Hebei, Liaoning

Highway system
- National Trunk Highway System; Primary; Auxiliary
→ G102

China National Highway 101 is a major trunk route connecting Beijing to Shenyang, Liaoning. In Beijing it is known as Jingshun Road (Chinese: 京顺路) or Jingmi Road (Chinese: 京密路) for connecting central Beijing to Shunyi District and Miyun District, although the actual road also connects Huairou District within Beijing and goes beyond Beijing as a major throughfare to Northern and Northeastern China.

It leaves Beijing at Dongzhimen and heads for Sanyuanqiao, running alongside the Airport Expressway^{:185} until Beigao, and then continues north while leaning toward the Jingcheng Expressway. Parts of Jingmi Road within Beijing are being renovated as an expressway separate from the national highway.

== Major connections ==
Note: Only connections to important city roads, expressways and other China National Highways (G level) are listed.

- 2nd Ring Road (Beijing): Dongzhimen Bridge
- 3rd Ring Road (Beijing): Sanyuan Bridge^{:185}
- 4th Ring Road (Beijing): Siyuan Bridge^{:188}
- 5th Ring Road (Beijing): Wuyuan Bridge^{:188}
- 6th Ring Road (Beijing): Liuyuan Bridge
- China National Highway 111: South of Huairou District; splits into independent G101 road to the northeast
- China National Highway 112: Hongshili, Hebei
- China National Highway 306: Lingyuan, Liaoning
- Jinchao Expressway: West of Chaoyang, Liaoning
- China National Highway 305: Northwest of Beipiao, Liaoning and Mayouying, Liaoning
- Jinfu Expressway: Wangfu, Liaoning
- China National Highway 304: Zhangwu, Liaoning
- Shenyang Round City Expressway: Lai'ertun Bridge, Shenyang, Liaoning

== Route identification and numbering ==
The national highway system uses the letter "G" (from guójiā, 国) followed by three digits. Routes numbered 101–112 emanate clockwise from Beijing.

== Technical details ==
While not always an expressway, G101 is often dual carriageway outside urban zones and enforces speed limits up to 100 km/h. Tolls apply in certain sections, particularly those co-located with expressways.

== Route and distance ==
Route and distance

City	Distance (km)
Beijing	0
Shunyi District, Beijing	
Huairou District, Beijing	
Miyun District, Beijing	
Chengde, Hebei	
Pingquan, Hebei	
Lingyuan, Liaoning	
Jianping County, Liaoning	
Chaoyang, Liaoning	
Beipiao, Liaoning	
Fuxin, Liaoning	
Zhangwu County, Liaoning	
Shenyang, Liaoning

== In popular culture ==
The road (as "Jingmi Road") is mentioned in Liu Cixin's novel The Three-Body Problem.
