= Dongzhimen =

City gate in Beijing, China

Coordinates: 39.9411°N 116.4336°E

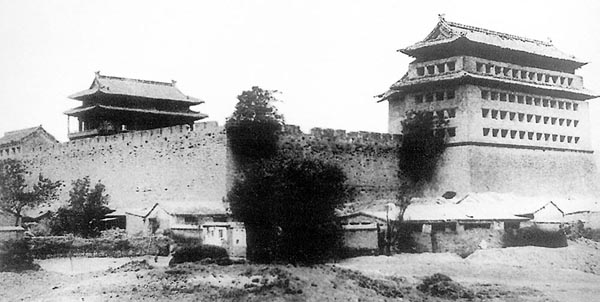
Dongzhimen in 1908

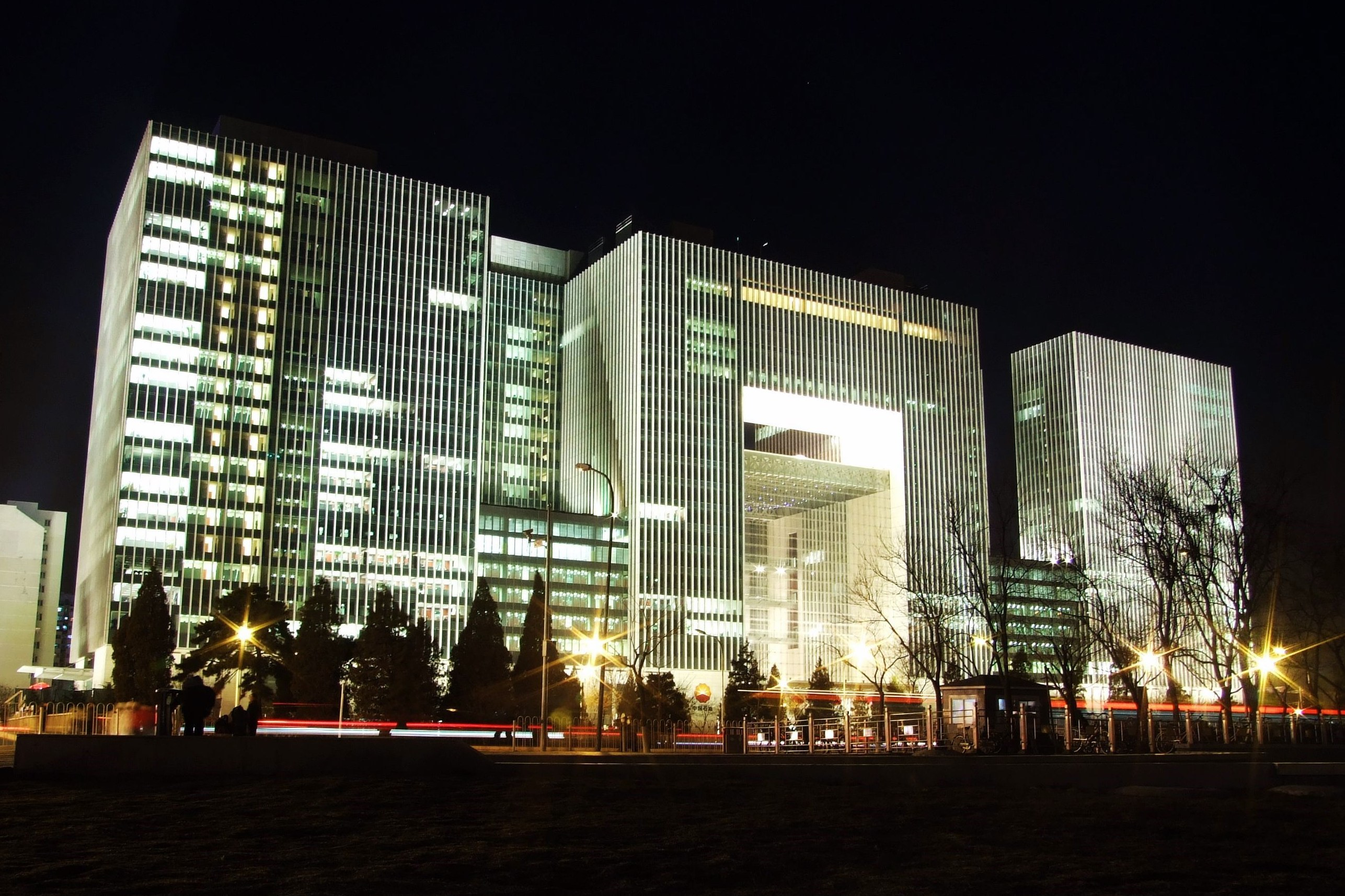
The landmark of Dongzhimen today - the headquarters of China National Petroleum Corporation/PetroChina

Dongzhimen (simplified Chinese: 东直门; traditional Chinese: 東直門; pinyin: Dōngzhímén; lit. 'East Straight Gate') was a gate in the old Beijing city fortifications. It is now a commercial center and transportation node in Beijing.

== History ==
The Marquis of Extended Grace lived near Dongzhimen.

== Transport ==
The 2nd Ring Road currently links with two roads which eventually become the Airport Expressway and China National Highway 101. A new flyover, and a new express road connects directly with the Airport Expressway.

The Beijing subway network has a interchange station at Dongzhimen, where Lines 2, 13 and Capital Airport Express connect. Line 13 has its eastern terminus at Dongzhimen.

Dongzhimen also has an extensive public bus hub just outside the Dongzhimen station. Buses numbered greater than 800 start from a long-distance bus station area, which serves a wide range of locations inside and outside of Beijing. This includes special buses to the Great Wall and long-distance buses to the mountains and caves north of Beijing and smaller suburban districts such as Pinggu.

== Ghost Street ==
West of Dongzhimen is Guijie (簋街), or "Food Vessel street" (Dongzhimen Inner Street). The character for Gui (簋) refers to a round-mouthed bamboo basket for food. The name is frequently mistaken for a similar-sounding word, meaning "ghost", so some refer to the street as "Ghost street". The street stretches for over one kilometer, and 90% of the commercial shops in the street house more than 150 eateries.

== Nearby areas ==
Connecting to the east of Dongzhimen is Dongzhimen Outer Street, which connects with the Northern Diplomatic Area and ultimately to the 3rd Ring Road as well as the National Agricultural Exhibition Hall.

1.5 km from Dongzhimen lies the nearby Sanlitun (三里屯) bar street, commonly frequented by the expat community located in the heart of Beijing's North Diplomatic Area.
