= 3rd Ring Road (Beijing) =

Ring road around the center of Beijing, China

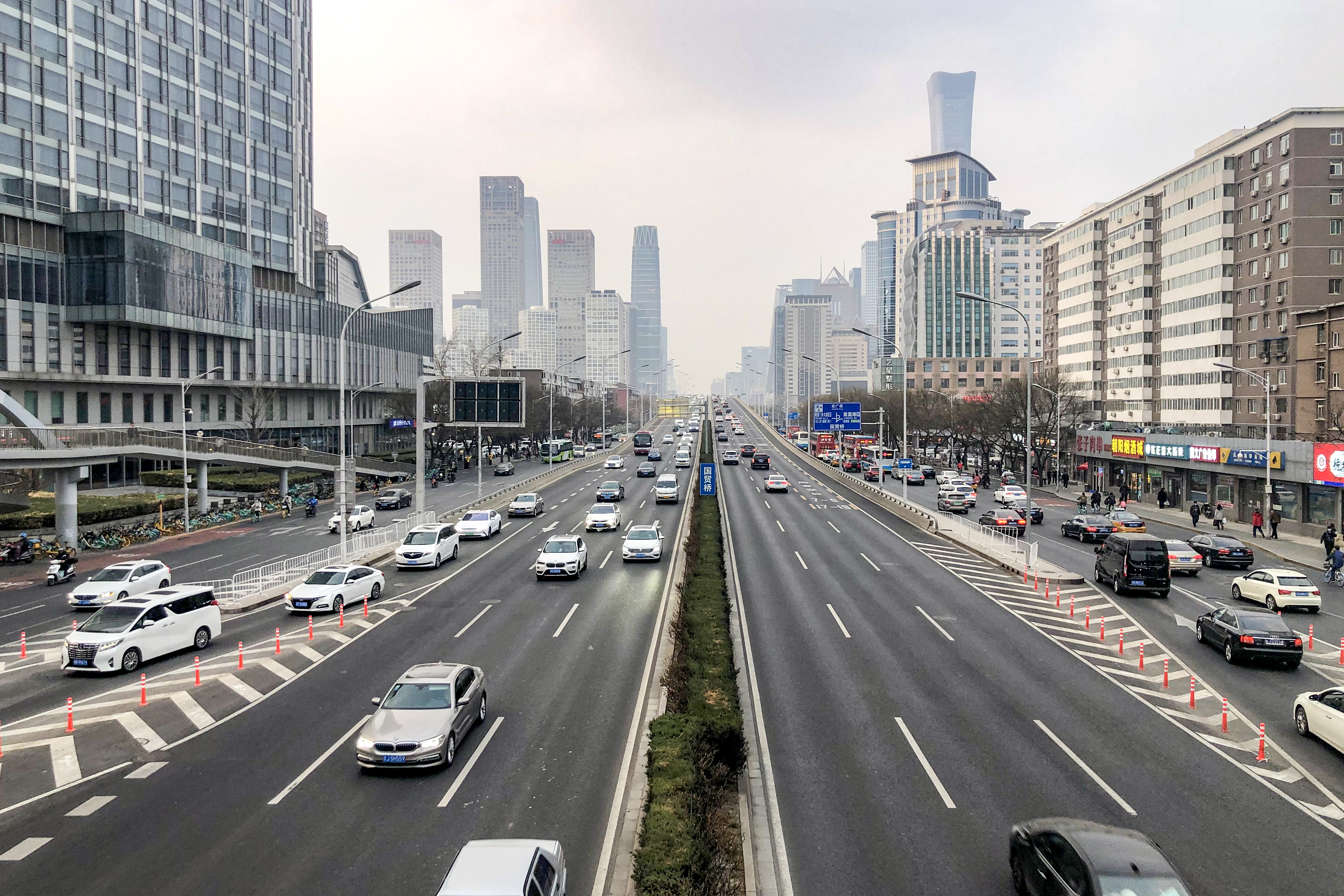
3rd Ring Road in Shuangjing Subdistrict

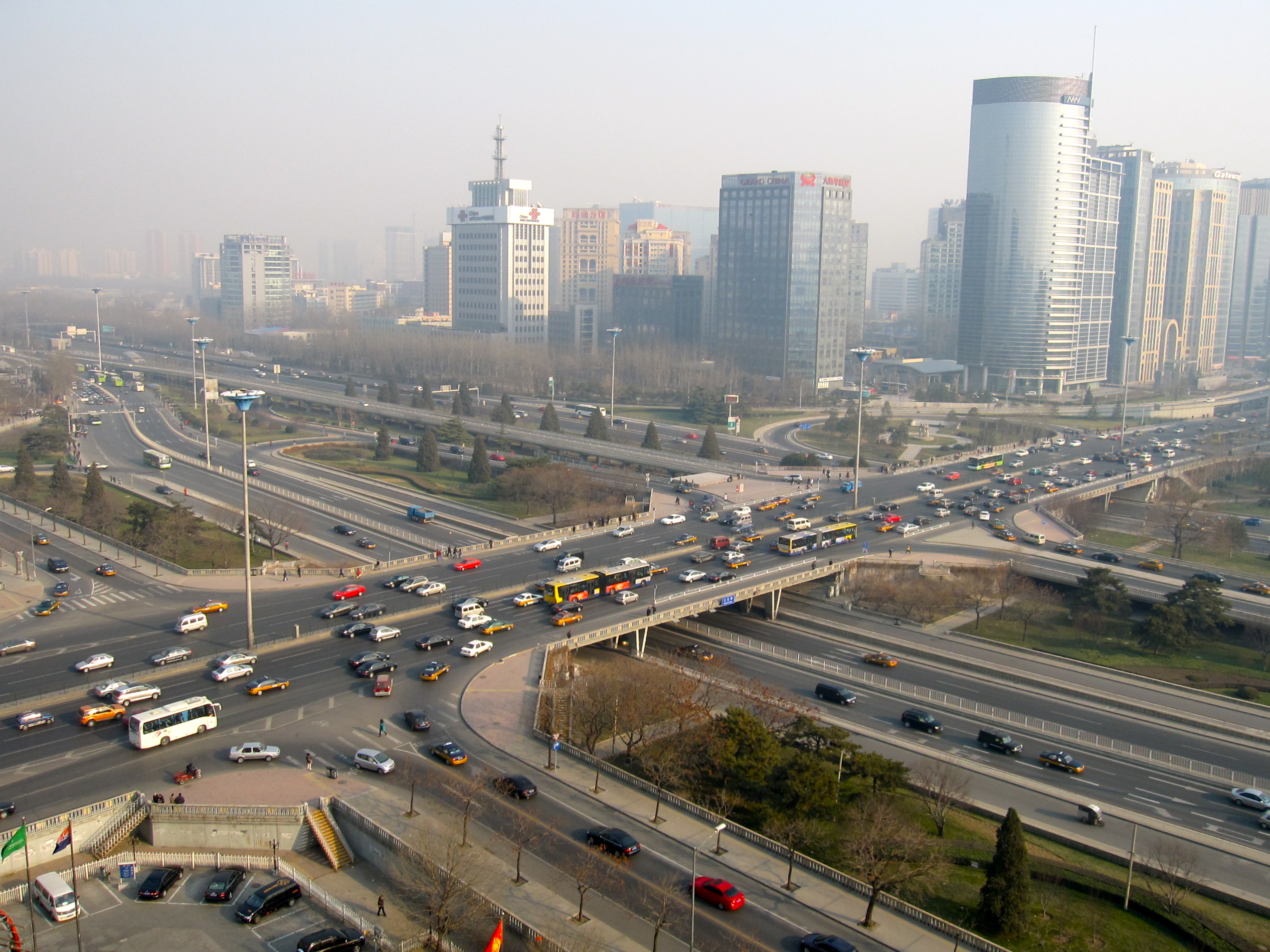
Interchange between the 3rd Ring Road and Airport Expressway

The 3rd Ring Road (simplified Chinese: 北京三环路; traditional Chinese: 北京三環路; pinyin: Sān Huán Lù) is a 48.2-kilometer (30.0 mi)-long city ring road that encircles the city center of Beijing.

When Beijing first became the capital of the People's Republic of China, the road existed only in segments encircling the northern, eastern, and southern parts of the city. At the time, its segments were known as Beihuan (North Ring), Donghuan (East Ring), and Nanhuan (South Ring), respectively. The 3rd Ring Road was finally finished in 1994 with the completion of the western segment. There are 52 flyovers, including Sanyuanqiao, which links it to the Airport Expressway. The speed limit is a uniform 80 km/h.

The ring road runs through the busy CBD section in the east through Panjiayuan and Fenzhongsi, linking up with the Jingjintang Expressway. It continues south toward Muxiyuan and Yuquanying, linking up with the Jingkai Expressway. It then proceeds west, linking up with the Jingshi Expressway before running into the western segment, which is linked with the Wukesong residential area, TV broadcasting centers, and, in the northwest, Zhongguancun IT zone. The northern segment is equally busy, running through Beitaipingzhuang, with links to the Badaling Expressway and the Jingcheng Expressway.

== Traffic congestion ==
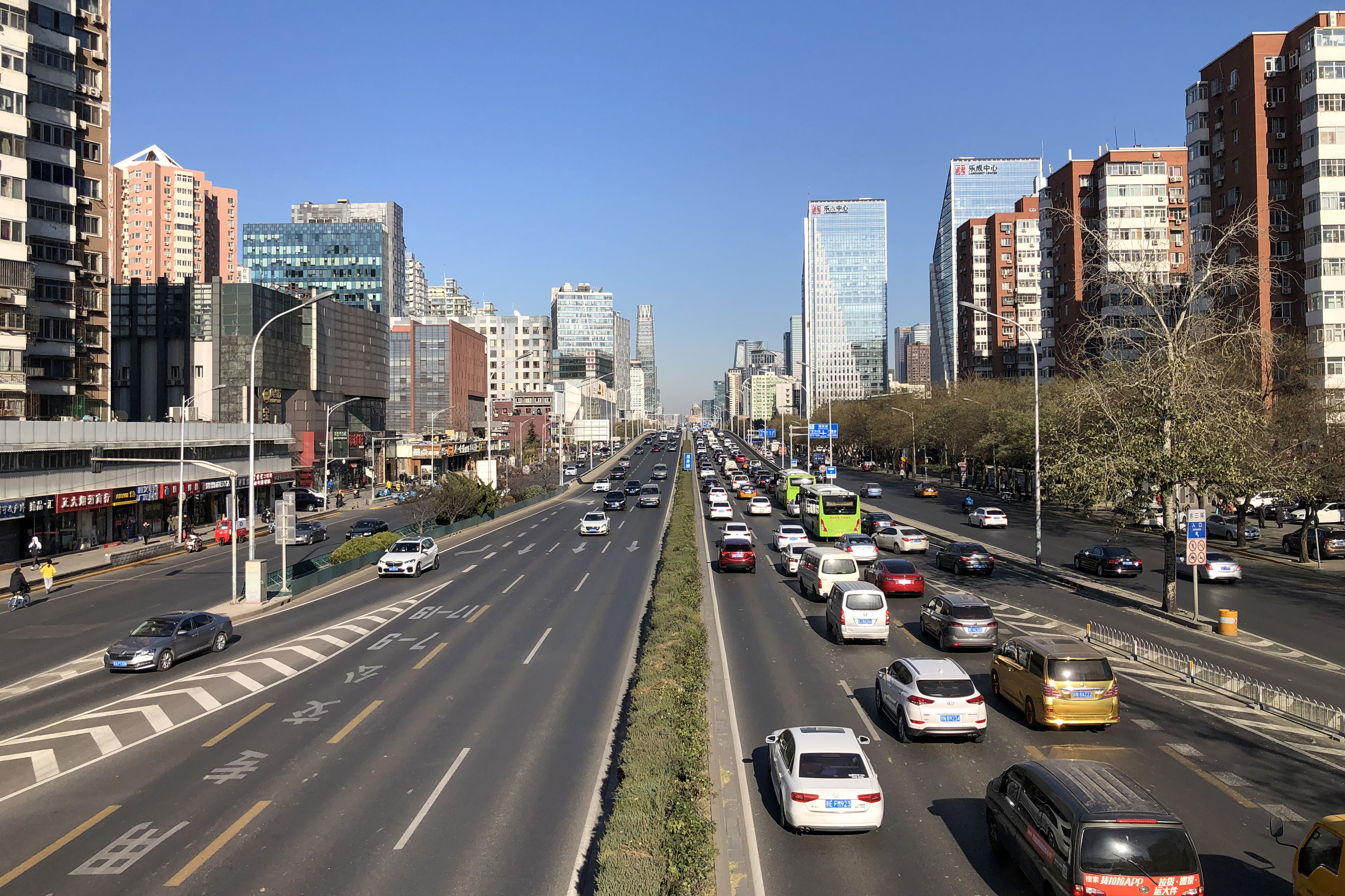
3rd Ring Road near Shuangjing, in December 2020

The 3rd Ring Road is notorious for its traffic jams. The eastern segment, which runs through Beijing's central business district (CBD), is regularly gridlocked during rush hour. The interchanges of this segment are modified diamond interchanges, consisting of openings of the road barrier on the right that separates the main lanes from the frontage roads. These interchanges can often back up traffic since they cannot easily handle the huge traffic volumes of Beijing. The situation is often worsened by the bus stops that are located right adjacent to the exits.

== Location ==
The 3rd Ring Road is 2.5 kilometers (1.6 mi) from the 2nd Ring Road and 5 kilometers (3.1 mi) from the city center. The 3rd Ring Road goes through mostly residential and some commercial areas (except for the CBD) that were created during Beijing's first wave of rapid expansion.

== Surface conditions ==
Until 2003, the entire 3rd Ring Road was very bumpy, and trips were very unpleasant. Following the renovation of the 2nd Ring Road in 2001, a similar project was conducted in 2003 and the road surface has been much smoother since then.

== Beijing Subway ==
Line 10 of the Beijing Subway has been constructed under the eastern segments of the 3rd Ring Road and was completed in 2008. Line 12 has been constructed under the northern segments of the 3rd Ring Road and was completed in 2024.
