= G4501 Beijing 6th Ring Expressway =

Expressway ring road in Beijing, China

Beijing 6th Ring Expressway
- 北京绕城高速公路
- 6th Ring Road 六环路
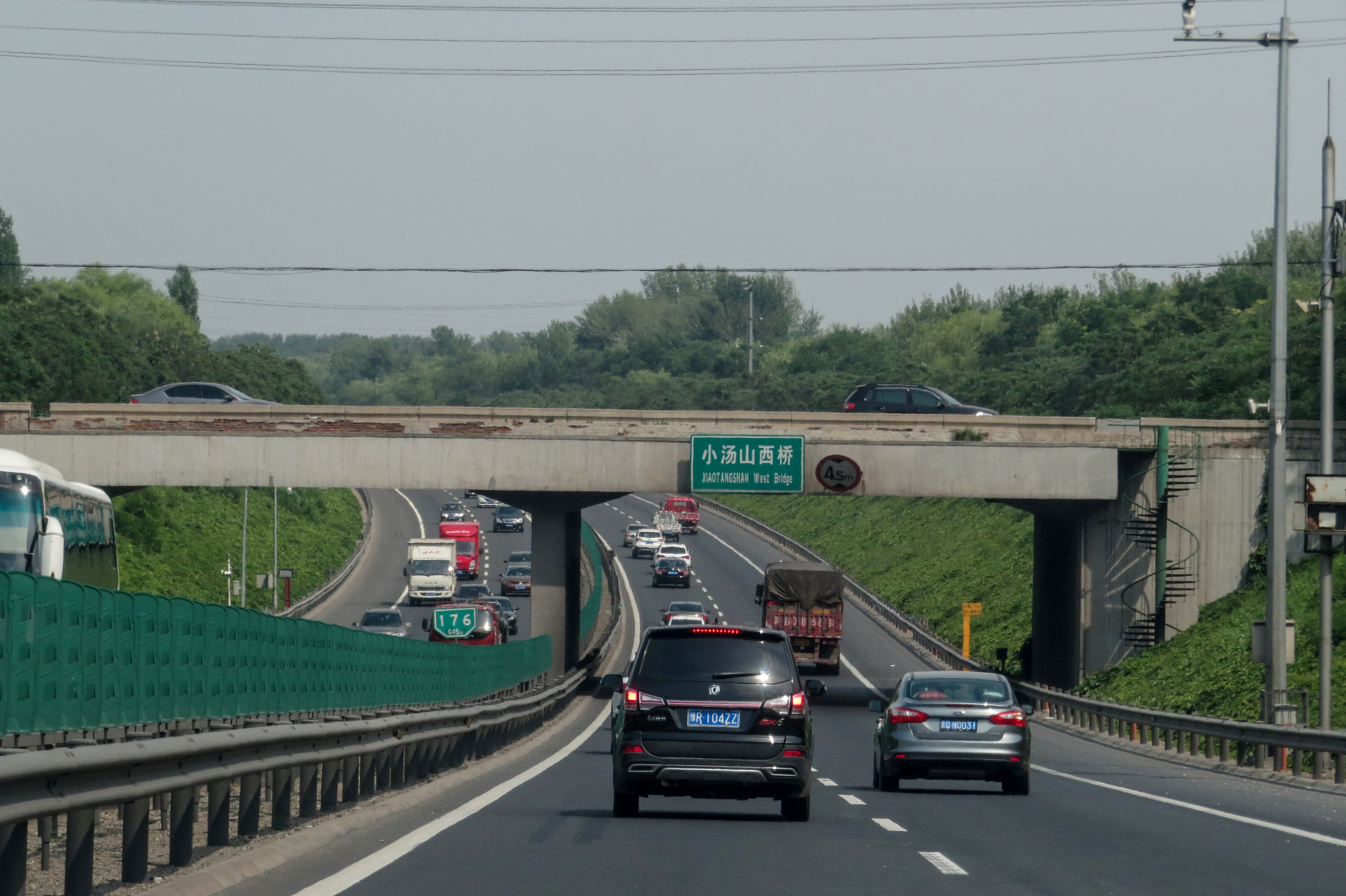

Route information
- Auxiliary route of G45
- Length: 220 km (140 mi)

Location
- Country: China

Highway system
- National Trunk Highway System; Primary; Auxiliary; National Highways; Transport in China
← G45	→ G4511

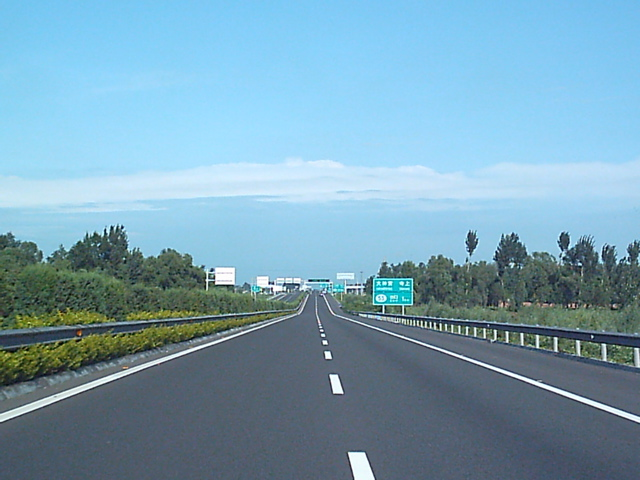
The northeastern section of the 6th Ring Road

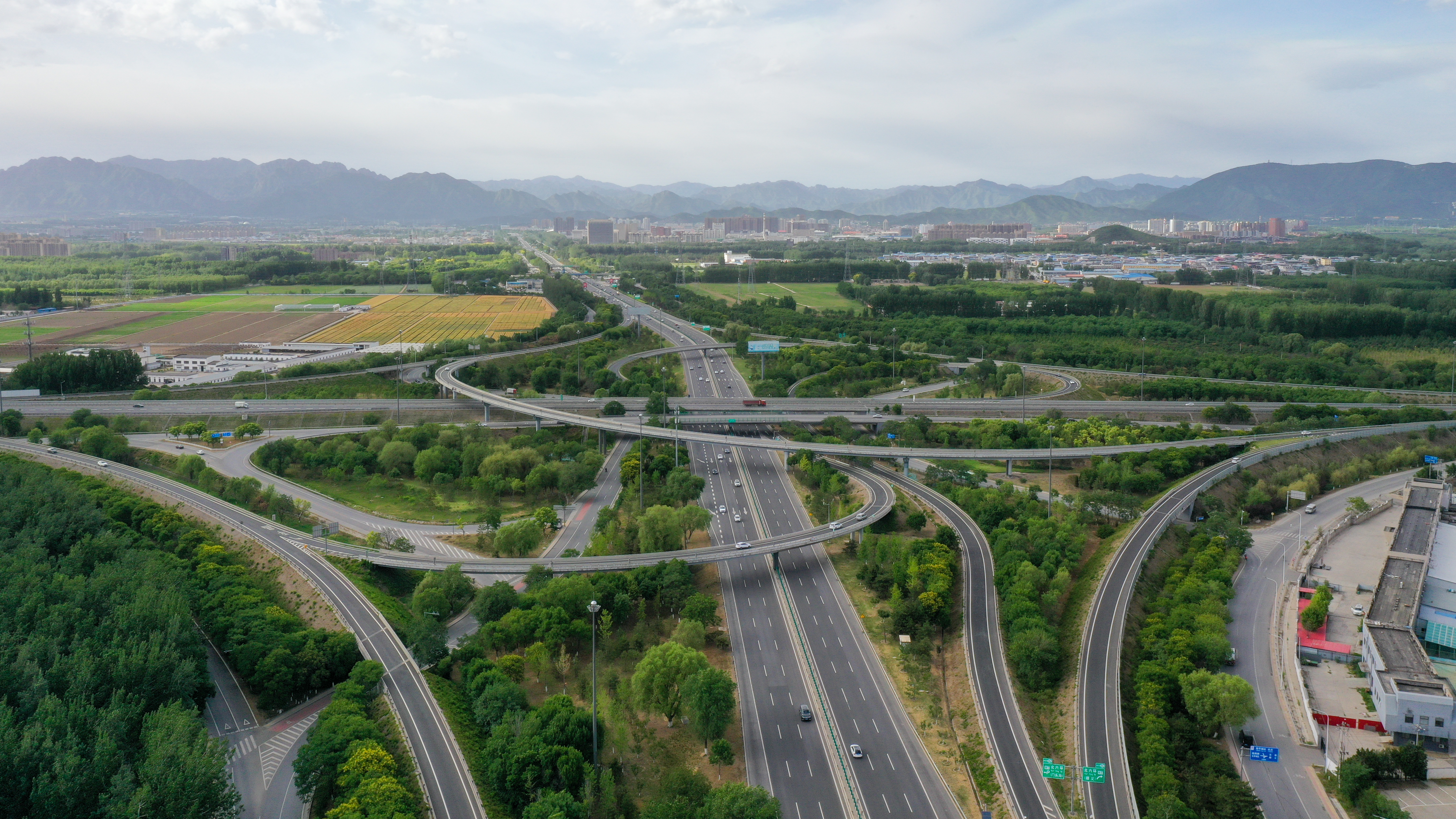
Baige Junction with the G6 Beijing–Lhasa Expressway in Changping District in 2022

The 6th Ring Road (Chinese: 六环路; pinyin: Liùhuán Lù) is an expressway ring road in Beijing, China, which runs around the city approximately 15–20 kilometres (9.3–12.4 mi) from the center of the city. The 6th Ring Road is approximately 220 kilometres (140 mi) long.

The road is numbered G4501 and is considered a peripheral segment of the G45 Daqing-Guangzhou Expressway. The 6th Ring Road was opened for regular traffic on 12 September 2009.

== Route ==
The 6th Ring Road runs within the confines of the municipality of Beijing.

Basic Route: Liuyuan Bridge - Liqiao - Sanhui Bridge - Zhangjiawan - Majuqiao - Huangcun - Liangxiang - Mentougou - Zhaikou/Wenquan - Xishatun - Gaoliying - Huosiying - Liuyuan Bridge

It is on the outer fringes of Beijing, and even beyond Beijing Capital International Airport. The expressway ring road is the only one to link with the equally remote Tongyan Expressway.

== History ==
As early as 2000 or 2001, the southeastern stretch from Sanhui Bridge (interchange with the Jingha Expressway) through to Majuqiao (interchange with the Jingjintang Expressway) was put into operation. The route was first referred to as the projected 2nd Expressway Ring Road, much like the 5th Ring Road was once referred to as the 1st Expressway Ring Road; however, that name was abandoned in favour of the present-day 6th Ring Road.

By 2002, a road section starting in Xishatun (interchange with the Badaling Expressway) through to Sanhui Bridge, as well as a stretch from Majuqiao through to Huangcun / Shuangyuan Bridge (interchange with the Jingkai Expressway), were complete and opened to the general public.

Another 43 km of the expressway ring road opened behind schedule (the portion linking it up with the Jingshi Expressway and ultimately ending in Liangxiang in December 2004 and the section from the Badaling Expressway to Wenquan/Zhaikou in Mentougou in early January 2005). They were slated for a November 2004 opening. In the first case, the expressway was opened on December 20, 2004, at 14:00 local time, with over a month's delay. The entire road was opened in 2010.

To re-connect several break-of-roads in sub-center region, Beijing Municipality government decided in 2019 that part of eastern 6th Ring, approximately 16 km, will be widened from 4-lane bidirectional to 6-lane, of which the middle 9.2km section will renovate as an underground section. After renovation, the on-ground sections will be re-constructed as a high line park. In September 2020, the biggest tunnel boring machine in China was built in Changsha to join the renovation works.

== Road conditions ==
=== Speed limit ===
The speed limit is set between a minimum of 50 kilometers per hour (km/h) and a maximum of 100 km/h. Potential speed checks at Zhangjiawan and 500 metres to the east of Yongdingmen/Langfang exit; otherwise, none. Some drivers may exceed the speed limit, while others may travel below it.

Southwestern 6th Ring Road: carriageway-separated; note: there are no "overtaking lanes" on this part of the ring road; left lane, maximum speed limit 100 km/h, minimum 80 km/h, designated "car only"; right lane, maximum speed limit 100 km/h, minimum 60 km/h, designated "carriageway".

=== Tolls ===
CNY 0.5/km, minimum charge of CNY 5, based on price for a small passenger vehicle. There have been (a few) calls to eradicate all toll gates within the confines of, and including, the 6th Ring Road. However, little to no action has been taken on this matter.
The 6th Ring Road is linked with Jingshi, Jingcheng, and Jingkai Expressways toll systems.

=== Lanes ===
Most sections are having 4 lanes (2 in each direction). There are some sections that were later widened to be 6 lanes (3 in each direction).

=== Traffic & Surface Conditions ===
The traffic is usually very smooth; however, on weekends, tourists flock to suburban districts causing occasional traffic jams. The exit at Baige Bridge is also usually jammed due to heavy police presence at the exit. Car crashes also cause rare traffic jams. Surface conditions are generally excellent.

== Major exits ==
Xishatun, Gaoliying, Sanhui Bridge, Zhangjiawan, Majuqiao, Huangcun/Shuanghui Bridge, Liuyuan Bridge

== Service areas ==
None; Beihuofa Service Area is projected (E. 6th Ring Road), as a gas station on the Southwestern 6th Ring Road.

== Connections ==
- S32 Jingping Expressway: Liqiao.
- China National Highway 102 (Tongyan Expressway): Sanhui Bridge.
- G1 Beijing–Harbin Expressway: Zhangjiawan.
- Jingjintang Expressway: Majuqiao.
- G45 Daqing–Guangzhou Expressway: Huangcun, Shuangyuan Bridge, Gaoliying.
- G4 Beijing–Hong Kong and Macau Expressway: Liyuan Bridge.
- Badaling Expressway: Xishatun.

== Vast distances ==
At a distance of 20 kilometres from the centre of town, the expressway covers a much larger distance than the inner ring roads. Equally large is the distance between two points.

For example, the distance between Jingtong Expressway to Jingshen Expressway is approximately 2 kilometres on the 4th Ring Road. It expands to nearly 4 kilometres on the 5th Ring Road. On the 6th Ring Road, 10 kilometres elapse from one expressway to the other—and the Jingtong to Jingshen Expressway (on the 6th Ring Road, the Jingha to Jingshen Expressway) is one of the shortest distances between expressways in Beijing.

Anything up to 30 - 35 kilometres can lapse between the Jingcheng Expressway and the Jingha Expressway.

For most people, travel on the 6th Ring Road is extremely rare. Although, strictly speaking, it is still on the perimeters of city limits, this is one massive ring road for a motorist to travel around.

== List of exits ==
District	Location	km	Junction	Destinations	Notes
Changping / Shunyi	Suanzaoling Bridge	0.0	1	North: G45 – Chengde; South: Beijing S11 Jingcheng Expwy – Northern 5th Ring Road	Start of G45 concurrency
Shunyi	Zhangxizhuang		2	X014 Huosi Road – Huoshenying, Sishang	
Shunyi	Liuyuan Bridge		3	G101 – Eastern 5th Ring Road, Wuyuan Bridge, Huairou, Miyun	
Shunyi	Shunyicheng		5	Airport East Road – Nanfaxin, Shunyi Urban Area, Pinggu	
Shunyi	Shunyi South Ring Road		6	Outer Ring Road/Shunxi South Road	
Shunyi	Liqiao		—	filling station	
Shunyi	Litian Bridge		7	Beijing S32 Jingping Expwy – PEK, Pinggu	
Tongzhou	Tongshun Road		8	S201 Tongshun Road – Liqiao, Tongzhou Beiguan	Outer-ring entrance and inter-ring exit only
Tongzhou	Xiaoyingcun Bridge		—	G0121 – Sanhe	Western traffic is under planning
Tongzhou	Xuxinzhuang		10	X012 Xuyin Road – Xuxinzhuang, Gaogezhuang	Outer-ring exit and inter-ring entrance only
Tongzhou	Luyuan North Street		11	Luyuan North Street – Tuanli, Songzhuang	
Tongzhou	Changtun Bridge		12	G102 (Tongyan Expwy) – Tongzhou Beiguan, Eastern 5th Ring Road, Sanhe	
Tongzhou	Xiaoshengmiao		14	Binhe South Road – Tongzhou Urban Area, Dongfang Industry	Outer-ring exit and inter-ring entrance only
Tongzhou	Tuqiao		15	G103 (Jiukeshu East Road) – Tianjin	No south-to-west ramp Near Tuqiao of Batong line Currently closed due to renovation
Tongzhou	Zhangjiawan North		—	Huanqiu Avenue	Near Huazhuang and Universal Resort stations of Batong line and Line 7
Tongzhou	Shiyuan Bridge/Zhangjiawan		17	G1 – Eastern 5th Ring Road, Wufang bridge, Shenyang; X015 Zhangtai Road (entrance only)	
Tongzhou	Beihuofa		—	filling station	
Tongzhou	Ciqu		20	North: X010 Puda Road – Ciqu; South: Puyao Road – Fatou	
Tongzhou	Xuzhuang Bridge		21	Beijing S15 Jingjin Expwy – 5th Ring Road, Huagong bridge, Tianjin	
Tongzhou	Majuqiao East		22	North: Xingmao South Street/Chushang 6th Road – Chujucheng; South: Sizhi Road (N)/Mada Road	Outer-ring entrance and inter-ring exit only
Tongzhou	Maju bridge		22	G2 (via side road)	
Tongzhou	Majuqiao West		22	Kuoma Road (old route); South: Xinsang Road (both via S322 Huangma Road) – Majuqiao	Outer-ring exit and inter-ring entrance only
Daxing	Taihe		25	Taihe East bridge (via S322 Huangma Road) – CNBG	Outer-ring entrance and inter-ring exit only
Daxing	Taihe		25	North: Boxing Road – Yizhuang; South: Ruihe Road – Ruihezhuang (both via S322 Huangma Road)	Outer-ring exit and inter-ring entrance only Near Taiheqiaobei and Ruihezhuang stations of Yizhuang T1 line
Daxing	Nandahongmen		26	G104 (via S322 Huangma Road) – Yinghai, Langfang	
Daxing	Beiyechang Bridge		—	G3 – Beijing Urban Area, Tianjin	
Daxing	Cigezhuang		28	S228 Nanzhongzhou Road (via S322 Huangma Road) – Southern 5th Ring Road, Zhiyuan West bridge, Weishanzhuang	
Daxing	S3501 bridge		—	S3501 Daxing Airport Expwy – Southern 5th Ring Road, PKX	
Daxing	Shuangyuan Bridge		31	G45 – Southern 5th Ring Road, Xihongmen South bridge, Gu'an, Kaifeng	End of G45 concurrency
Daxing	Niantan		32	Tianshui Street – Huangcun	Near Biomedical Base of Daxing line
Daxing	Beijiancun		33	Chunlin Street/Tianhe West Road – Lucheng, Beijiancun	
Daxing	Xinli		—	filling station	
Fangshan	Changyang		35	G107 – Changyang, Yaoshang	
Fangshan	Changyang bridge		35	G0424 (was S3601 Jingxiong Expwy)	
Fangshan	Liangxiang		36	X003 Liangchang Road – Liangxiang, Guandao	
Fangshan	Fangshan Liyuan Bridge		38	G4 – Western 5th Ring Road, Liyuan bridge, Zhuozhou, Shijiazhuang	
Fangshan	Yancun West		40	S326 Dajian Road – Liangxiang, Yanshan	Near Yancundong of Fangshan line/Yanfang line, and Zicaowu of Yanfang line
Fangshan	Dayuancun		41C	Beijing S66 Jingkun Connection Expwy (SW traffic); S319 Liangtuo Road – Tuoli, Liangxiang	Only south-to-west and west-to-south bounds ramps for S66
Fangshan	Dayuancun Bridge		41A-B	Beijing S66 Jingkun Connection Expwy (NW/NE traffics) – Shijiazhuang, S315 Jingliang Road	Outer-ring exits and inter-ring entrances only
Fangshan / Fengtai	Qinglonghu		42	West: S328 Quanhu West Road – Qinglonghu; East: S328 Quanhu East Road – Wangzuo	
Fengtai	Qianlingshan		43	Shayang Road (沙羊路) – Yungang, Luoping	Near Dahuichang
Fengtai	Beigong Forest Park		44	Dahuichang East Road – Changxindian, Shimenkou	Near Dahuichang
Mentougou	Shimenying		45	G108 – Tanzhe Temple, Laiyuan, Western 5th Ring Road, Yamenkou bridge	Proposed to be the startpoint of new G5 route.
Mentougou / Shijingshan	Guangning		46	Fushi Road – Mentougou, Shijingshan	Near Sanjiadian
Mentougou	Junzhuang Bridge		47	S3701 Jingyu Expwy; G109 – Miaofengshan, Zhuolu, Junzhuang	Near Junzhuang
Mentougou	Laomiao		48	S210 Junzhuang Road	Outer-ring entrance and inter-ring exit only Currently closed for renovation
Haidian	Dajuesi		49	S210 Junzhuang Road – Junzhuang, Dajue Temple, Wenquan	Near Zhaikou
Haidian	Zhoujiaxiang		—	filling station	
Haidian	Beiqing Road		50	Beiqing Road – Qinghe, Bei'anhe	Near Bei'anhe and Wenyang Lu stations of Line 16
Haidian	Wenyang Road		51	West: Niegezhuang East Road – Niegezhuang; East: Cuihu North Road – Education Base	
Changping	Shayang Road		52	S324 Shayang Road (沙阳路) – Shahe, Yangfang; Baishuiwa Road	Near Houzhangcun
Changping	Tuchengcun East bridge		53A	S3801 Jingli Expwy – Garden Expo, Yanqing	
Changping	Shuangheng Road		53B	Baige Road – Gecun, Baishan	
Changping	Louzizhuang bridge		54	G7 – Northern 5th Ring Road, Badaling Great Wall, Zhangjiakou	
Changping	Baige bridge (W)		—	U-turn ramp to Shunyi, Changping	Private ramp
Changping	Baige bridge		56	G6 – Northern 5th Ring Road, Shangqing bridge, Badaling	
Changping	Higher Education Park		58	Huichang Road – Beijing Shahe Higher Education Park	Near Shahe Univ. Park of Changping line
Changping	Baishan North		—	filling station	
Changping	Baishan		59	S321 Shunsha Road – Baishan, Shahe	
Changping	Asuwei		—	Sichang Road	Private entrance, only internal vehicles of Asuwei Landfill can enter/exit
Changping	Mafang		61	Sichang Road – Beiyuan, Xiaotangshan	
Changping / Shunyi	Suanzaoling bridge	0.0	1	(see above)	
1.000 mi = 1.609 km; 1.000 km = 0.621 mi: Concurrency terminus; Incomplete access; Unopened
