= Shibalidian =

Shibalidian may refer to:

- Shibalidian, a transportation node that links 4th Ring Road with Jingjintang Expressway
- Shibalidian station, a subway station on Line 17 of the Beijing Subway
- Shibalidian Township, a township on the southwest of Chaoyang
