= Caiyu =

Caiyu Town 采育镇
- Town
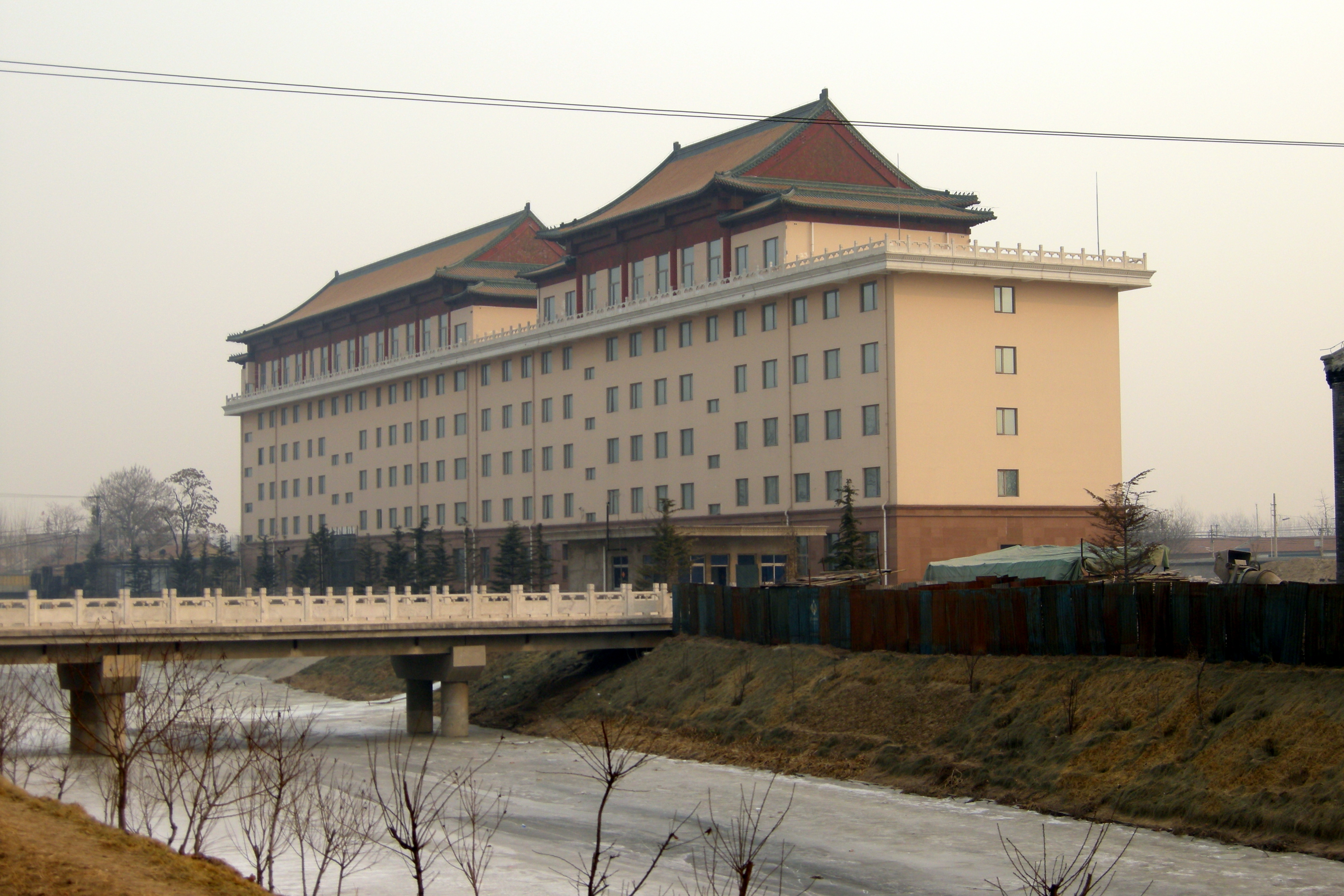
- Hot Spring Center in Fengheying, south of the town, 2012

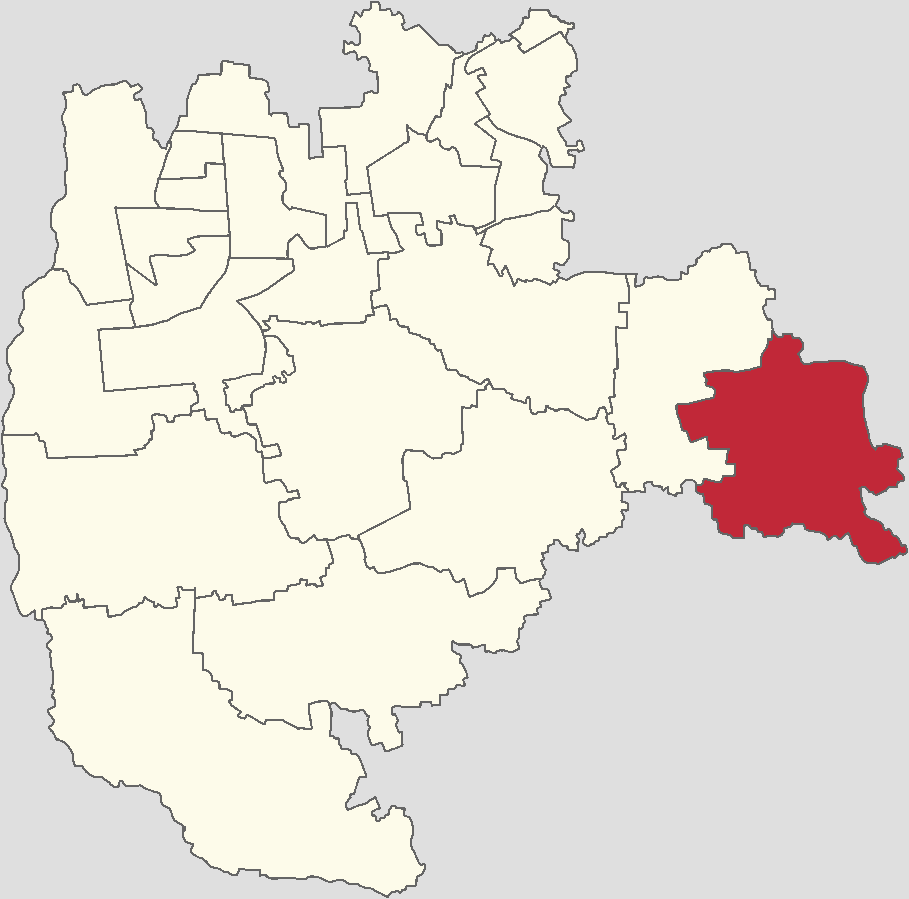
- Location of Caiyu Town within Daxing District

- Location within Beijing Location within China
- Coordinates: 39°39′20″N 116°37′45″E
- Country: China
- Municipality: Beijing
- District: Daxing
- Village-level Divisions: 3 communities 55 villages 1 economic development area

Area
  - Total: 71.54 km^{2} (27.62 sq mi)
- Elevation: 19 m (62 ft)

Population (2020)
  - Total: 54,690
  - Density: 764.5/km^{2} (1,980/sq mi)
- Time zone: UTC+8 (China Standard)
- Postal code: 102606
- Area code: 010

Caiyu Town (simplified Chinese: 采育镇; traditional Chinese: 采育鎮; pinyin: Cǎiyù Zhèn) is a town located in the east end of Daxing District, Beijing, China. It shares border with Majuqiao Town and Yujiawu Hui Ethnic Township to the north, Yongledian Town to the east, Wanzhuang Town and Langfang Economic Development Area to the south, and Changziying Town to the west. As of 2020, the population of Caiyu Town was 54,690.

According to Tianfu Guangji written during the Qing dynasty, the region had been called Caiweili in older times, and had been renamed Fanyushu in the early days of Ming dynasty. Later people started to combine the two names to form the name Caiyu.

== History ==
Timeline of Caiyu Town
Year	Status	Within
1928 - 1930	2nd District	Daxing County
1930 - 1948	Caiyu Town	Daxing County
1948 - 1953	9th District	Daxing County
1953 - 1956	5th District	Daxing County
1956 - 1958	Caiyu Township	Daxing County
1958 - 1961	Caiyu People's Commune	Daxing County
1961 - 1974	Caiyu People's Commune Fengheying People's Commune	Daxing County
1974 - 1983	Caiyu People's Commune Fengheying People's Commune Dapiying People's Commune	Daxing County
1983 - 1990	Caiyu Township Fengheying Township Dapiying Township	Daxing County
1990 - 2000	Caiyu Town Fengheying Township Dapiying Township	Daxing County
2000 - 2001	Caiyu Town	Daxing County
2001–present	Caiyu Town	Daxing District

== Administrative divisions ==
In 2021, 59 subdivisions constituted Caiyu Town, consisted of 3 residential communities, 55 villages, and 1 economic development area:

Administrative division code	Subdivision names	Name transliteration	Type
110115104001	育星苑	Yuxingyuan	Community
110115104002	波尔多	Bo'erduo	Community
110115104003	满庭春	Mantingchun	Community
110115104200	大黑垡村	Daheifa Cun	Village
110115104201	宁家湾村	Ningjiawan Cun	Village
110115104202	北辛店村	Beixindian Cun	Village
110115104203	南辛店一村	Nanxindian Yicun	Village
110115104204	南辛店二村	Nanxindian Ercun	Village
110115104205	北山东村	Beishan Dongcun	Village
110115104206	北营村	Beiying Cun	Village
110115104207	西营一村	Xiying Yicun	Village
110115104208	西营二村	Xiying Ercun	Village
110115104209	西营三村	Xiying Sancun	Village
110115104210	西营四村	Xiying Sicun	Village
110115104211	东营一村	Dongying Yicun	Village
110115104212	东营二村	Dongying Ercun	Village
110115104213	南营二村	Nanying Ercun	Village
110115104214	南三一村	Nansan Yicun	Village
110115104215	南三二村	Nansan Ercun	Village
110115104216	南三三村	Nansan Sancun	Village
110115104217	南山东营一村	Nanshan Dongying Yicun	Village
110115104218	南山东营二村	Nanshan Dongying Ercun	Village
110115104219	施家务村	Shijiawu Cun	Village
110115104220	西辛庄村	Xixinzhuang Cun	Village
110115104221	东庄村	Dongzhuang Cun	Village
110115104222	后甫村	Houfu Cun	Village
110115104223	前甫村	Qianfu Cun	Village
110115104224	屯留营村	Tunliuying Cun	Village
110115104225	岳街村	Yuejie Cun	Village
110115104226	邵各庄村	Shaogezhuang Cun	Village
110115104227	下黎城村	Xialicheng Cun	Village
110115104228	沙窝营村	Shawoying Cun	Village
110115104229	潘铁营村	Pantieying Cun	Village
110115104230	辛庄营村	Xinzhuangying Cun	Village
110115104231	韩营村	Hanying Cun	Village
110115104232	铜佛寺村	Tongfosi Cun	Village
110115104233	广佛寺村	Guangfosi Cun	Village
110115104234	包头营村	Baotouying Cun	Village
110115104235	大皮营一村	Dapiying Yicun	Village
110115104236	大皮营二村	Dapiying Ercun	Village
110115104237	大皮营三村	Dapiying Sancun	Village
110115104238	小皮营村	Xiaopiying Cun	Village
110115104239	杨堤村	Yangdi Cun	Village
110115104240	利市营村	Lishiying Cun	Village
110115104241	东潞州村	Dongluzhou Cun	Village
110115104242	大同营村	Datongying Cun	Village
110115104243	山西营村	Shanxiyung Cun	Village
110115104244	大里庄村	Dalizhuang Cun	Village
110115104245	东半壁店村	Dong Banbidian Cun	Village
110115104246	倪家村	Nijia Cun	Village
110115104247	龙门庄村	Longmenzhuang Cun	Village
110115104248	张各庄村	Zhanggezhuang Cun	Village
110115104249	哱啰庄村	Boluozhuang Cun	Village
110115104250	康营村	Kangying Cun	Village
110115104251	延寿营村	Yanshouying Cun	Village
110115104252	庙洼营村	Miaowaying Cun	Village
110115104253	凤河营村	Fengheying Cun	Village
110115104254	沙窝店村	Shawodian Cun	Village
110115104401	北京采育	Beijing Caiyu	Economic Development Area

== Gallery ==
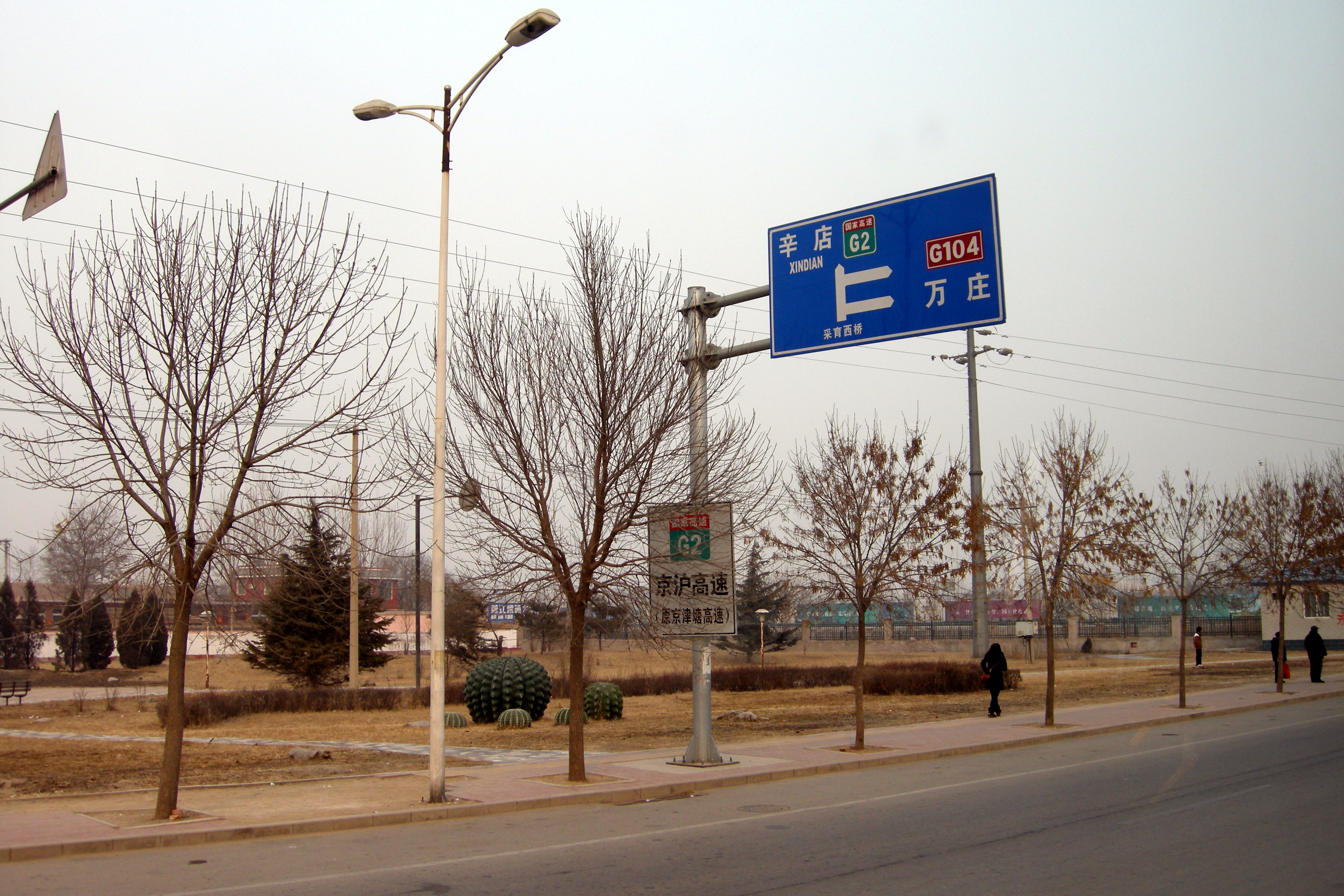
Beijing-Shanghai Expressway passing through the town, 2012

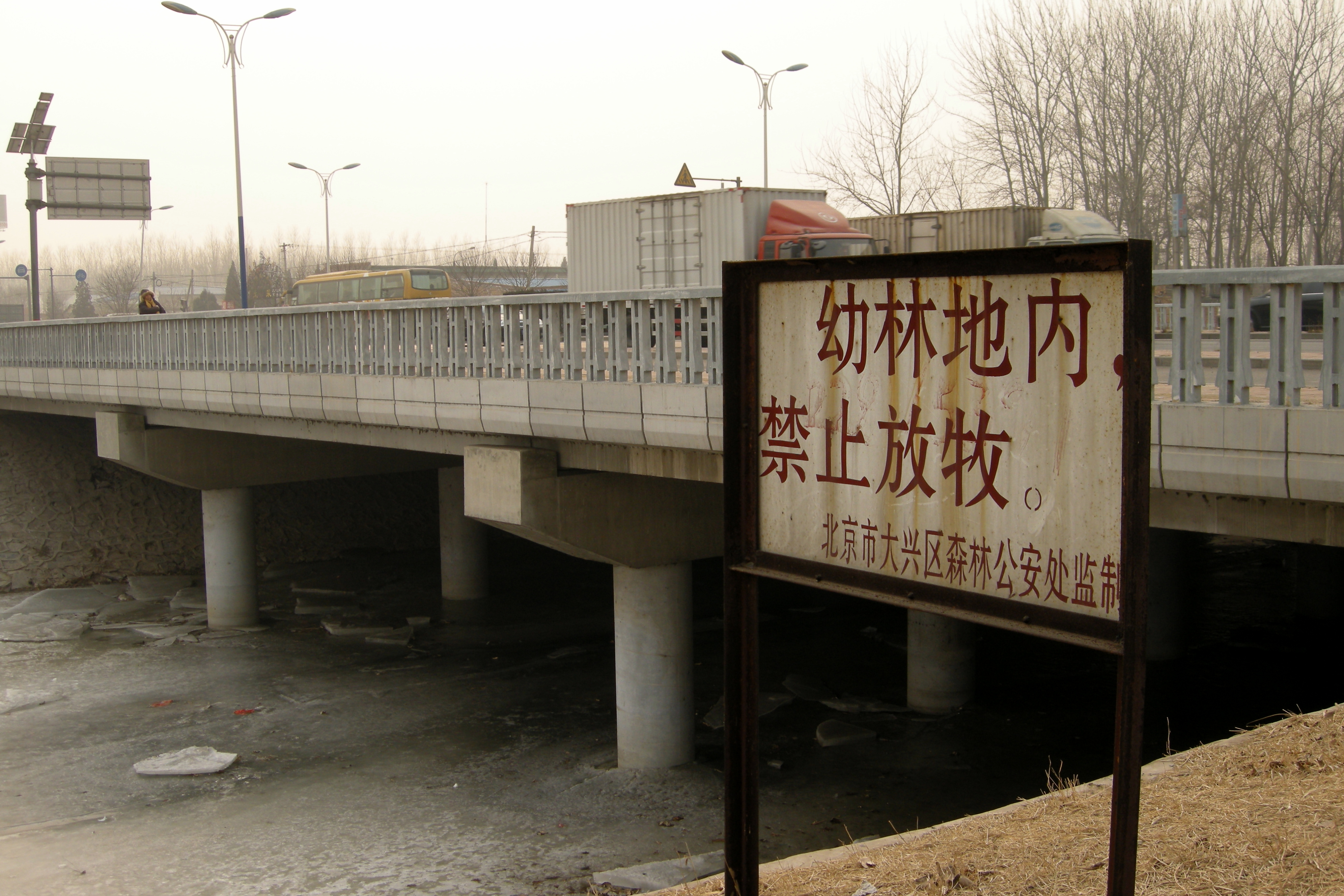
Fengheying Bridge, 2012

== See also ==
- List of township-level divisions of Beijing
