= Jinbin Expressway =

Road in Tianjin, China

Jinbin Expressway
- Jīnbīn Gāosù Gōnglù 津滨高速公路
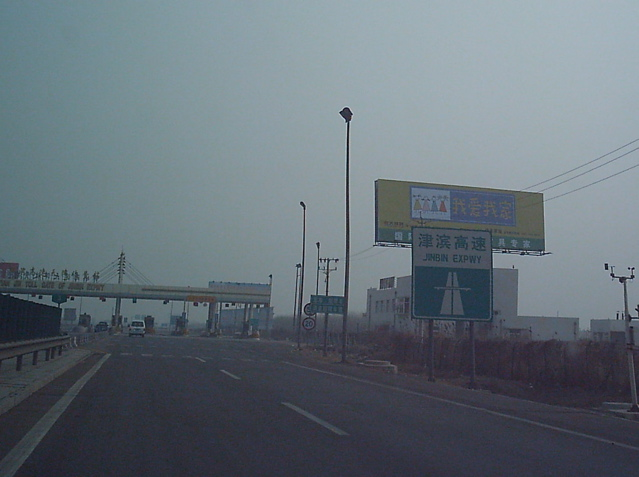

Route information
- Length: 33.54 km (20.84 mi)

Major junctions
- From: Outer Ring Road, Tianjin
- To: Tanggu, Tianjin

Location
- Country: China
- Province: Tianjin
- Major cities: Tianjin

Highway system
- Transport in China

The Jinbin Expressway is a direct expressway link from central Tianjin to Tanggu and TEDA, China. It is 33.54 km in length, 28.54 of which exists as an expressway, and 5 km as a city express road.

== Route ==
The Jingjintang Expressway runs through the Tianjin in its entirety.

Basic Route: Tianjin (Dongxing Bridge - Zhangguizhuang Bridge - Tanggu)

Status: The entire expressway is complete.

== History ==
The Jinbin expressway was opened in late February 2001.

The expressway slashes driving time on the equidistant Jintang Highway by 20 minutes.

== Road Conditions ==
=== Speed Limit ===
Designed speed limit of 120 km/h.

=== Tolls ===
Toll expressway, uses sensor-style IC cards.

=== Lanes ===
4 lanes (2 up, 2 down).

== Connections ==
- Middle Ring Road (Tianjin): Dongxing Bridge
- Outer Ring Road (Tianjin): Zhangguizhuang Bridge
