= Middle Ring Road =

Middle Ring Road may refer to:

== Roads ==
=== China ===
- Middle Ring Road (Shanghai)
- Middle Ring Road (Tianjin)

=== United Kingdom ===
- A4540 road, Birmingham, England - also known as the Middle Ring Road

=== Malaysia ===
- Kuala Lumpur Middle Ring Road 1, Kuala Lumpur
- Kuala Lumpur Middle Ring Road 2, Kuala Lumpur
