= Yujiawu Hui Ethnic Township =

Ethnic township in Beijing, China

Yujiawu Hui Ethnic Township 于家务回族乡
- Ethnic Township
- Location within Beijing Location within China
- Coordinates: 39°43′04″N 116°41′52″E
- Country: China
- Municipality: Beijing
- District: Tongzhou
- Village-level Divisions: 2 communities 23 villages

Area
  - Total: 65.7 km^{2} (25.4 sq mi)

Population (2020)
  - Total: 34,734
  - Density: 529/km^{2} (1,370/sq mi)
- Time zone: UTC+8 (China Standard)
- Postal code: 101127
- Area code: 010

Yujiawu Hui Ethnic Township (simplified Chinese: 于家务回族乡; traditional Chinese: 于家務回族鄉; pinyin: Yújiāwù Huízú Xiāng) is an ethnic township on southern Tongzhou District, Beijing, China. It shares border with Zhangjiawan and Huoxian Towns in its north, Yongledian Town in its east, Caiyu Town in the southwest, and Majuqiao Town in the west. Its population was 34,734.

== History ==
Timetable of Yujiawu Town
Year	Status	Within
1946 – 1953	Part of Dongkaolaobao Township	Tong County
1953 – 1959	Part of the 5th District	Tong County
1959 – 1961	Yujiawu Management District, Part of Niubaotun People's Commune	Tong County
1961 – 1965	Yujiawu People's Commune	Tong County
1965 – 1970	Yujiawu People's Commune	Yongledian Farm
1970 – 1983	Yujiawu Branch	Yongledian Farm
1983 – 1998	Yujiawu Hui Ethnic Township (Incorporated Qutou Township in 2000)	Yongledian Farm
1998–present	Yujiawu Hui Ethnic Township (Incorporated Qutou Township in 2000)	Tongzhou District

== Administration divisions ==
As of 2021, Yujiawu had 25 subdivisions underneath, where 2 of them were communities, and the other 23 were villages:

Administrative division code	Subdivision names	Name transliteration	Type
110112209001	于家务西里	Yujiawu Xili	Community
110112209002	永济	Yongji	Community
110112209201	于家务	Yujiawu	Village
110112209202	南仪阁	Nanyige	Village
110112209203	北辛店	Beixindian	Village
110112209204	大耕垡	Dagengfa	Village
110112209205	东马各庄	Dong Magezhuang	Village
110112209206	西马坊	Xi Mafang	Village
110112209207	神仙	Shenxian	Village
110112209208	果村	Guocun	Village
110112209209	渠头村	Qutoucun	Village
110112209210	富各庄村	Fugezhuang	Village
110112209211	满庄村	Manzhuangcun	Village
110112209212	王各庄	Wanggezhuang	Village
110112209213	崔各庄	Cuigezhuang	Village
110112209214	南三间房村	Nan Sanjianfang	Village
110112209215	小海字村	Xiaohaizi Cun	Village
110112209216	枣林村	Zaolun Cun	Village
110112209217	吴寺村	Wusi Cun	Village
110112209218	仇庄村	Qiuzhuang Cun	Village
110112209219	南刘庄	Nanliuzhuang	Village
110112209220	东垡村	Dong Facun	Village
110112209221	西垡村	Xi Facun	Village
110112209222	后伏	Houfu	Village
110112209223	前伏	Qianfu	Village

== Economics ==
In 2018, Yujiawu's tax revenue was 820 million yuan, and the average disposable income was 26,000 yuan.

== See also ==
- List of township-level divisions of Beijing
