= Jinxiong Expressway =

Road in China

Baojin Expressway 保津高速公路 Jinxiong Expressway 津雄高速公路
- Bǎojīn Gāosùgōnglù; Jīnxióng Gāosù Gōnglù
- G18 Rongcheng–Wuhai Expressway 荣乌高速公路
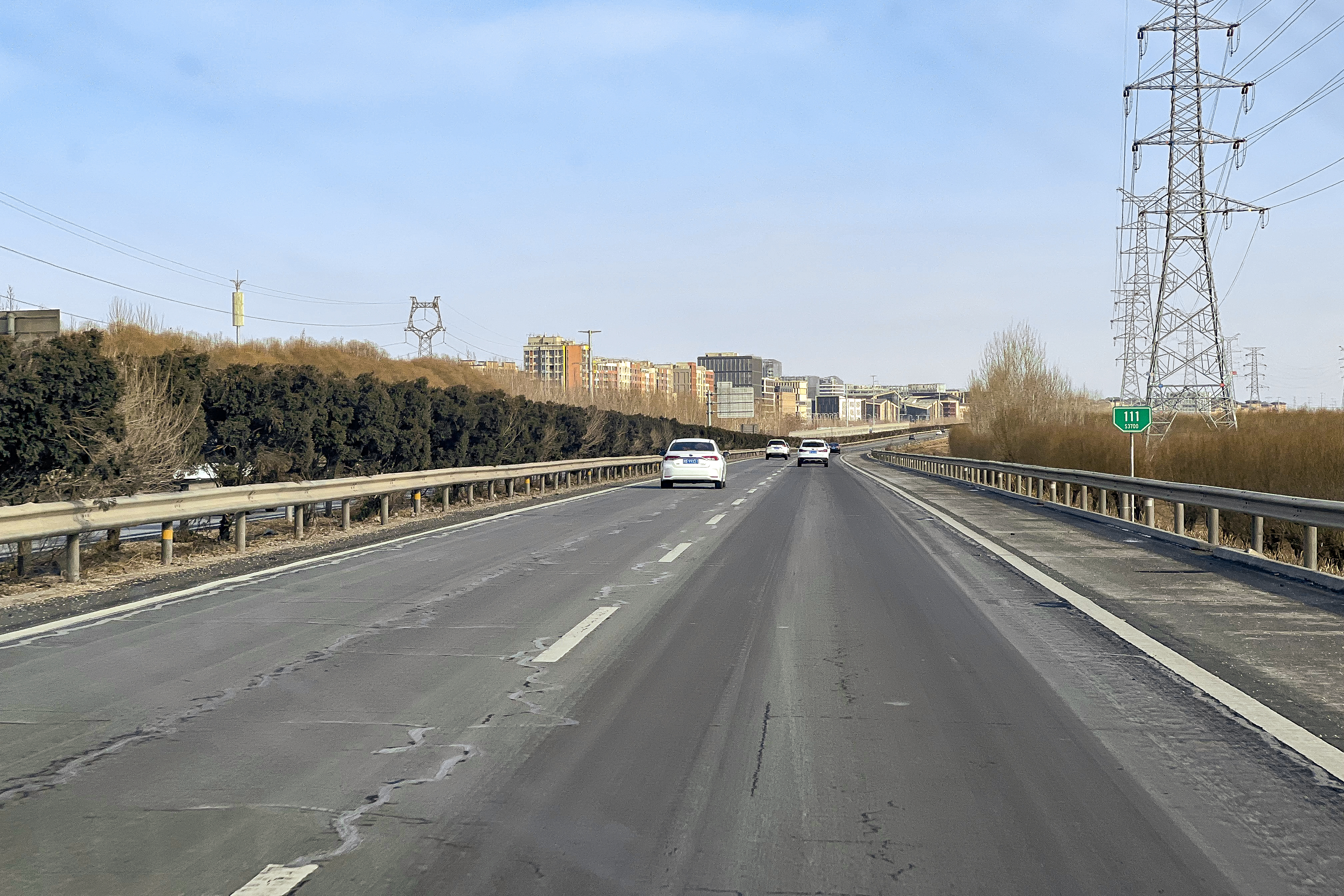

Route information
- Length: 129 km (80 mi)

Major junctions
- From: Outer Ring Road, Tianjin
- To: Xushui, Baoding, Hebei

Location
- Country: China
- Province: Tianjin

Highway system
- Transport in China

The Baojin Expressway/ Jinxiong Expressway (Chinese: 保津高速公路/ 津雄高速公路; pinyin: Bǎojīn Gāosùgōnglù/ Jīnxióng Gāosù Gōnglù) is a highway in north China, linking Baoding in Hebei province with Tianjin municipality.

The expressway was first built in 1995 and opened to the general motoring public in mid-December 1999. It links Baoding, Xushui, Rongcheng and heads east toward Tianjin, linking Xiongxian and Bazhou.

The 129 km-long expressway is designed for a speed that, as of May 2004, is the maximum speed legally tolerated on PRC expressways—120 km/h. (The Tianjin part, though, has a lower speed limit of 110 km/h.)

The western part links with the Jingshi Expressway 118 kilometres after its starting point from Beijing's 3rd Ring Road at Liuliqiao. It is not far away from the city of Baoding.

The eastern end links with the Waihuan (Outer Ring) Road in Tianjin, which links to other expressways in the region, such as the Jingjintang Expressway to Beijing and Tanggu, and the Jinghu Expressway to Shanghai.

Three service areas exist along the expressway.
