= PRAC =

PRAC may refer to:

- Pandemic Response Accountability Committee, to oversee funds distributed by the U.S. Coronavirus Aid, Relief, and Economic Security Act
- Probabilistic Action Cores, natural-language understanding software

praC may refer to:

- 2-hydroxymuconate tautomerase, an enzyme

PrAc may refer to:

- Praseodymium(III) acetate, a chemical compound with informal formula PrAc.
