= Jingjintang Expressway =

Expressway between Beijing and Tianjin, China

Coordinates: 39.2271°N 117.2063°E

( ) Jinjingtang Expressway Chinese: 京津塘高速公路
- G2 Beijing–Shanghai Expressway; Chinese: 京沪高速公路 (G0212 Wuqing-Binhai Expressway; Chinese: 武清—滨海新区高速公路)
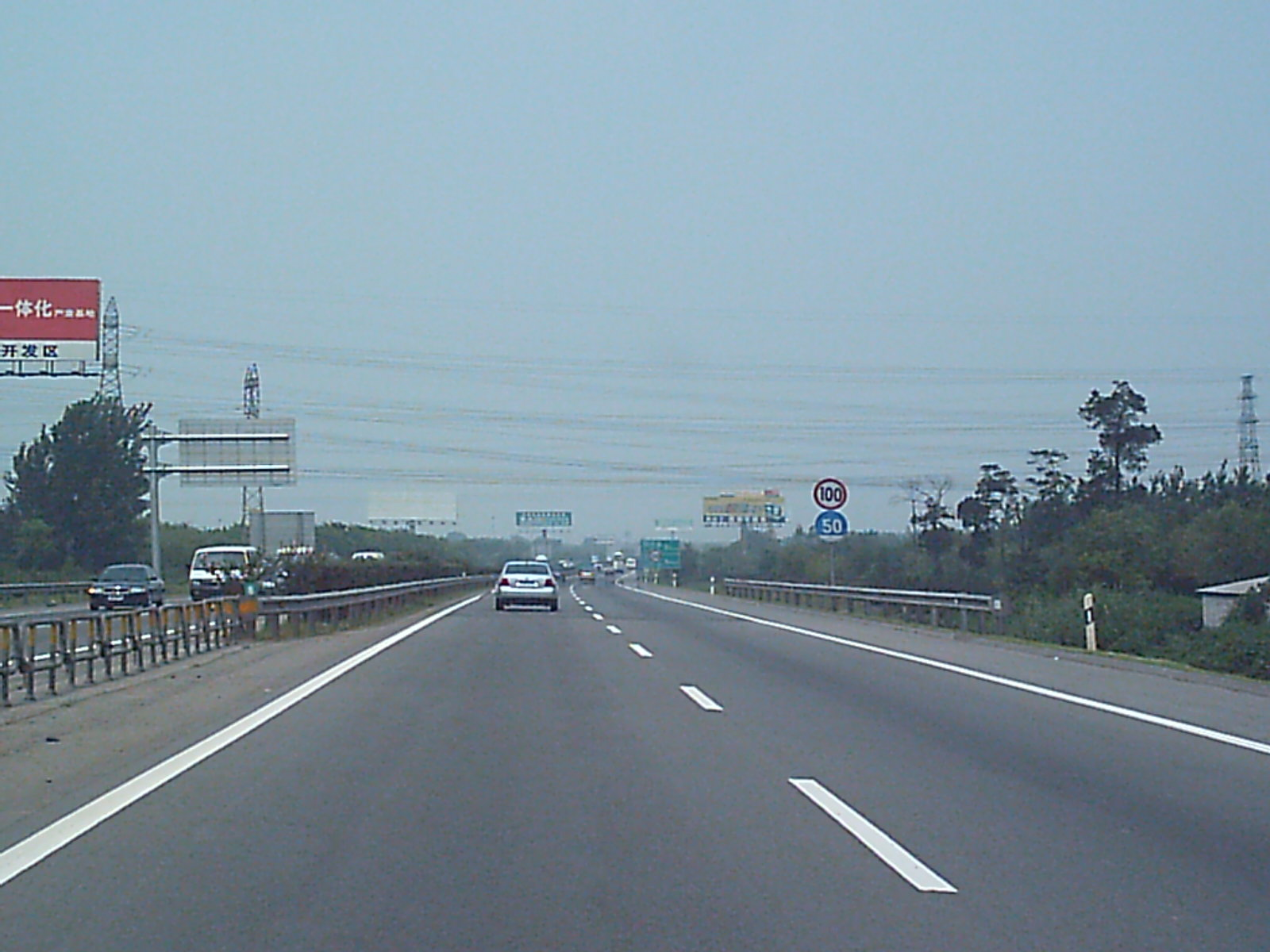
- Jingjintang Expressway in Beijing in 2004

Route information
- Part of AH3
- Length: 142.7 km (88.7 mi)
- Existed: 1993–present

Major junctions
- North end: 3rd Ring Road in Fenzhongsi, Beijing
- South end: Tanggu District, Tianjin

Location
- Country: China
- Province: Tianjin

Highway system
- Transport in China

Jingjintang Expressway (Chinese: 京津塘高速公路; pinyin: Jīngjīntáng Gāosùgōnglù), also known as the Jingtang Expressway, links Beijing via central Tianjin to the Tanggu District in eastern Tianjin. 143 kilometres in length, it crosses the jurisdictions of Beijing and Tianjin municipalities and Hebei province.

Tolls apply as of Dayangfang near the Eastern 5th Ring Road in Beijing until the Tanggu/TEDA exit. The expressway uses a networked toll system across all jurisdictions and is managed by Huabei (North China) Expressways.

This route is now part of G2 Beijing–Shanghai Expressway and Tianjin expressway.

== Route ==
The Jingjintang Expressway runs through the municipalities of Beijing and Tianjin, as well as Hebei province.

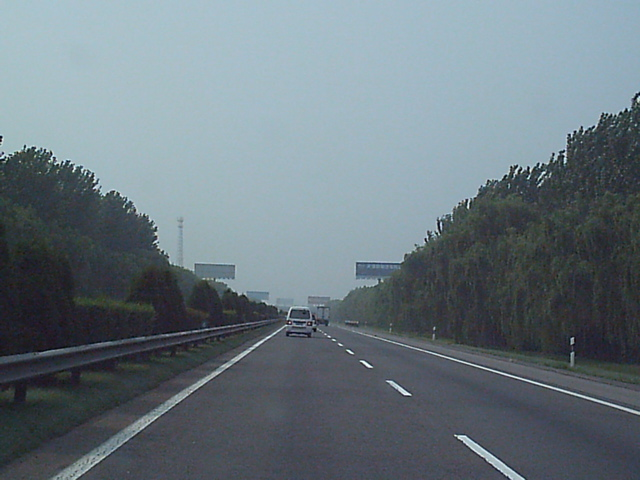
Jingjintang Expressway in Tianjin, July 2004

Beijing (Fenzhongsi - Shibalidian - Dayangfang - Majuqiao - Caiyu) - Langfang (Hebei) - Tianjin (Yangcun - Central Tianjin - Tianjin Airport - Tanggu District/TEDA).

== History ==
The expressway opened on September 25, 1993, and was the first expressway to be built to more recent standards.

This expressway has slashed driving time from Beijing to Tianjin to around one hour, and has created a corridor between Beijing and Tianjin.

=== Accidents ===
Areas of the expressway are many times very foggy and that has led to a number of accidents.

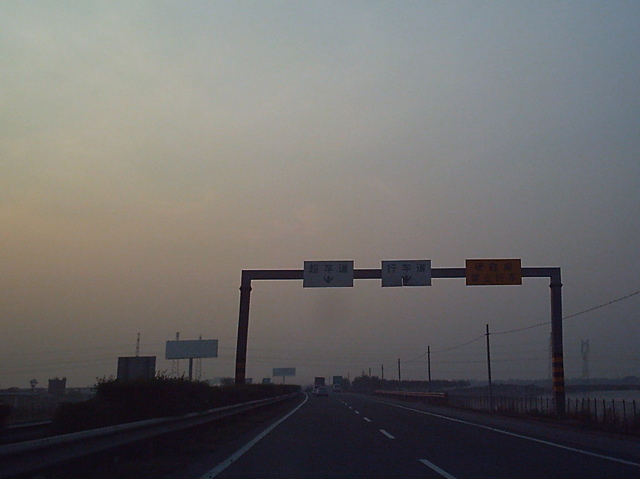
Jingjintang Expressway in Tanggu, October 2004 (Note the nonstandard, Chinese-only traffic signs)

On October 19, 2004, seven vehicles involved in three accidents plunged into each other in early morning fog, killing two and injuring many more on the stretch of expressway from Beijing to Tianjin, at the stretch between Majuqiao and Caiyu.

== Parallel Expressways ==
With a history of over ten years, the expressway was beginning to feel the crunch of massive traffic, especially the increase of heavy lorries. As a result, at least two other expressways linking Beijing to Tianjin were constructed.

A variation of routes leaves Beijing heading toward Pinggu District, and links with the Jinji Expressway.

== Road Conditions ==
=== Speed Limit ===
Uniform maximum speed limit of 110 km/h (sparsely signposted at times) outside of Beijing; Beijing section now only 90 km/h. However, the Beijing section from Fenzhongsi through Shibalidian has a mixed speed limit of 70 km/h or 80 km/h (only when leaving Beijing).

=== Tolls ===
Tolls apply for the stretch east of Dayangfang until Tanggu.

=== Lanes ===
4 lanes (2 up, 2 down), with emergency shoulders. Exception: Section in Beijing (Fenzhongsi - Shibalidian) has 6 lanes (3 up, 3 down).

== Major Exits ==
Fenzhongsi, Dayangfang, Majuqiao, Caiyu, Langfang, Yangcun, Yixingbu, Central Tianjin, Tianjin Airport, Tanggu

== Service Areas ==
Majuqiao, Xuguantun, Dongli.

== Connections ==
Ring Roads of Beijing: Connects with the SW 3rd Ring Road at Fenzhongsi, the SW 4th Ring Road at Shibalidian, the SW 5th Ring Road at Dayangfang and the SW 6th Ring Road at Majuqiao.
Jinghu Expressway: Connects with the Jinghu Expressway at Yixingbu.
Jinji Expressway: Connects with the newly opened Jinji Expressway at Central Tianjin exit (Jinzhong Road).
Tianjin Outer Ring Road: Connects at Yixingbu.

== Safety ==
Upon its completion, the PRC authorities and state media spared the least of efforts in trumpeting the creation of the Jingjintang Expressway, promoting it to the bitter end, and creating an illusion that the expressway was it in the PRC's expressway world. As a result of this widespread promotion, the expressway was known as the "golden expressway".

In November 2004, however, things looked very different. Incessant traffic jams, breakdowns, and chaos on the expressway earned it a more popular nickname—the "road of death".

The very problem lies within the expressway itself—massive traffic. The expressway was designed for a traffic audience of 50,000 vehicles a day—and apparently, not a vehicle more, as the current average of 59,000 vehicles a day is stretching the expressway to its limits. Meanwhile, during periods of high use, 130,000 vehicles are reported to be using the expressway -- per day.

Compounding the problem is a very narrow (2.4 m in width) hard shoulder, and the lack of emergency bays. Compound that with fog in the southeastern Beijing section, and no lights at night outside of the 4th Ring Road (Beijing), and one understands why the label "road of death" sticks so well to the expressway today.

== Traffic ==
China was a different country back in 1993, when the expressway first opened. For a start, there were fewer drivers, and traffic—especially expressway traffic—was less of a problem. Therefore, when the expressway opened in September 1993, it could cope rather well with just two lanes in one direction—for over a hundred kilometres.

Things changed in the late 1990s. Private citizens could apply for driver's licences with greater ease, and traffic as a whole increased on PRC roads. The situation on the expressway in 2004, therefore, is different from that of 1993.

A 2004 traffic jam—or traffic disturbance—that upset just one lane (not to mention more than one lane), would upset the entire expressway. Traffic would begin to pile up for kilometres and hours on end. The relative lack of exits (only ten for the entire stretch) could further compound the problem.

As it forms a vital corridor for traffic from Tianjin and Tanggu, the expressway is often full of lorries. Two lorries overtaking each other would shrink average speed limits for the car following behind considerably—from the legal 110 km/h down to approximately 80 km/h or sometimes even 60 km/h.

== List of exits ==
Symbols: ↗ = exit (→ = only on way out of Beijing), ✕ = closed exit, ⇆ = main interchange; ¥ = central toll gate; S = service area

=== Beijing Section ===
Listed are exits heading southeast as of Beijing (3rd Ring Road)

- ⇆ (Interchange with 3rd Ring Road) Fenzhongsi
- ⇆ (Interchange with 4th Ring Road) Nansihuan (S. 4th Ring Road)
- ✕ 2: Dayangfang, Jiugong -- exit disused as of 2002 and in effect replaced by 5th Ring Road
- ⇆ (Interchange with 5th Ring Road) 5th Ring Road
- ¥ Dayangfang
- S Majuqiao
- ⇆ 3: Majuqiao, Liuhuanlu
- ⇆ 4: (Interchange with China National Highway 104) G104, Caiyu

=== Hebei Section ===
Listed are exits heading southeast as of the jurisdictional boundary with Beijing

- ↗ 5: Langfang

=== Tianjin Section ===
Listed are exits heading southeast as of the jurisdictional boundary with Hebei/Tianjin (Wuqing District)

- ⇆ 7: (Interchange with China National Highway 103) Hexiwu, Yangcun (G103)
- S Xuguantun
- ⇆ 8: (Interchange with Tianjin Outer Ring Road) Yixingbu
- ⇆ 9: (Interchange with Jinji Expressway) Lutai, Tianjin City
- ↗ Tianjin Airport
- S Dongli
- ⇆ (Interchange with Tangjin Expressway)
- ¥ Tanggu
- ↗ Tanggu
