= Jinji Expressway =

Road in Tianjin, China

Jinji Expressway
- Jinji Gāosù Gōnglù 津蓟高速公路
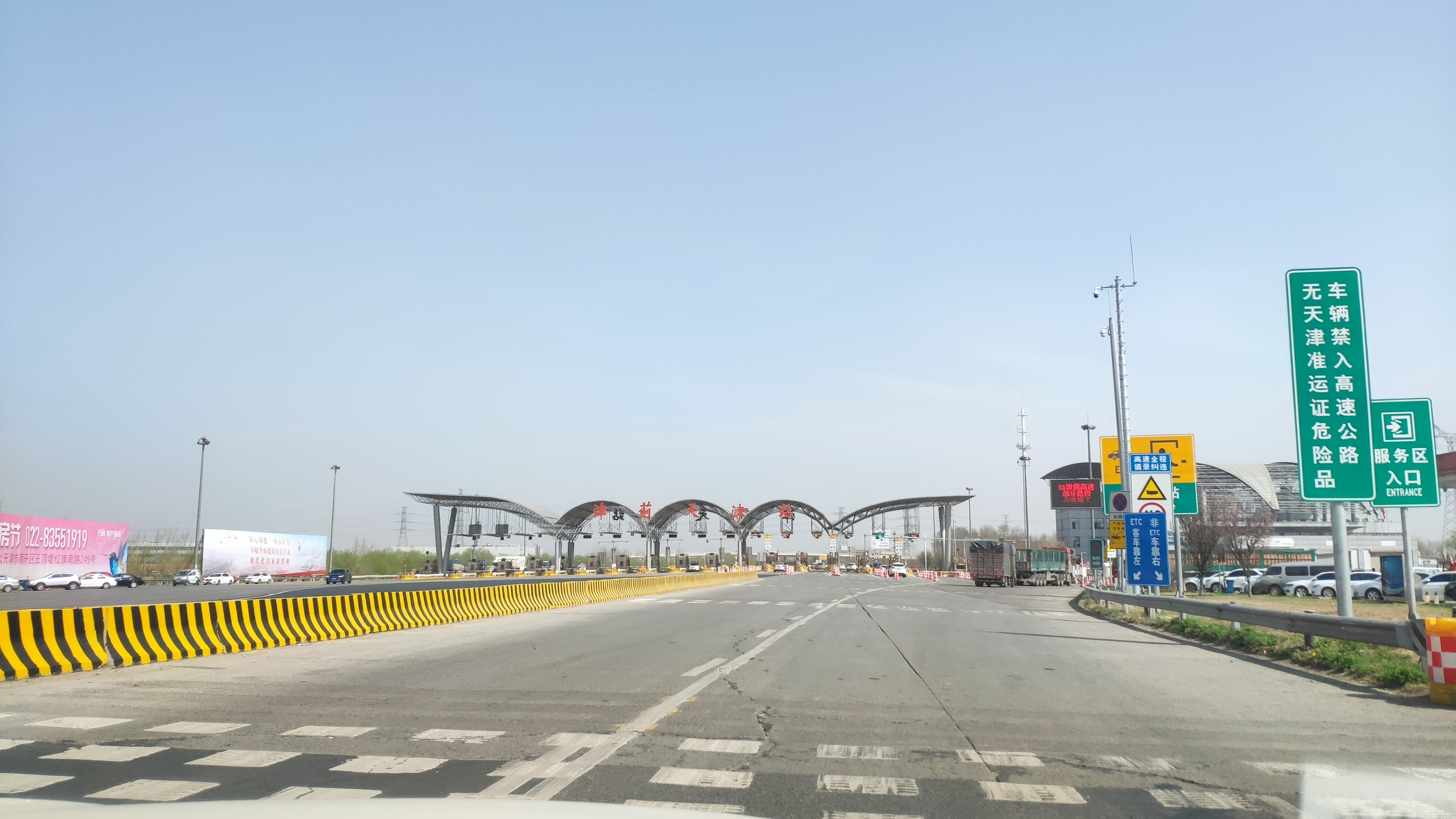

Route information
- Length: 104 km (65 mi)
- Existed: 26 September 2003–present
- Component highways: Beijing S3201

Major junctions
- From: Ji County, Tianjin
- To: Outer Ring Road, Tianjin

Location
- Country: China
- Major cities: Tianjin

Highway system
- Transport in China

The Jinji Expressway runs entirely within Tianjin, linking Tianjin city in the south with Ji County in the north, which is reflected in its name, Tianjin–Ji County. The expressway stretches for 104 kilometres and opened on 26 September 2003, just days before China's National Day holiday, October 1. The road is sometimes subject to heavy traffic.

== Route ==
It starts just after the Jinzhonglu exit on the Jingjintang Expressway and the Tianjin outer ring road, and heads northeast, gradually heading north, eventually crossing the Jingshen Expressway at Jinwei (Baodi North).

After this, it heads directly north toward Ji County, crossing China National Highway 102, before coming to an end at Bangxi Highway, near Ji County.

The expressway passes through Dongli District, Beichen District, Baodi District and Ji County.

The northern end is close to portions of the Great Wall of China. This end has been linked up to the Jingping Expressway since 2008. The Jinji Expressway therefore forms another (somewhat indirect) passageway from Beijing to Tianjin.

== Exits and Service Areas ==
The expressway has remarkably few exits and just one service area. Additional toll charges apply for vehicles of non-Tianjin licence plates coming into Tianjin, waived only for military and diplomatic vehicles, as well as vehicles on emergency duty.

== Speed Limit ==
There is a uniform speed limit of 110 km/h, albeit national legislation raising it to 120 km/h (which is the speed limit it was actually designed for).
