= Station 53 (Beijing Subway) =

Metro station not opened to the public in Beijing, China

Gaojing 高井
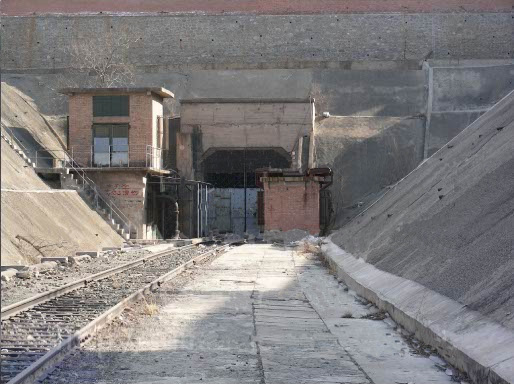
- The portal west of 53 Station

General information
- Other names: Station 53 (53号站); Wusan station
- Location: Shijingshan District, Beijing; China
- Coordinates: 39°56′50″N 116°08′51″E
- Operator: Beijing Mass Transit Railway Operation Corporation Limited
- Line: Line 1
- Platforms: 1 (island platform)
- Tracks: 2

Other information
- Status: Not Open to Public Use

History
- Former names: Fushouling station (福寿岭站)
Location
- Location within Beijing

Station 53, also known as Gaojing Station and Wusan Station, formerly known as Fushouling Station, is the westernmost station in the underground section of Beijing Subway Line 1 in its early planning. Its exit is located at No. Jia-32 (甲32号), Gaojing (高井), Shijingshan District, Beijing. Station 53 has been built and opened to traffic, and commuter trains once ran through it, but it has not yet been put into operation.

== History ==
During planning phases, the station was once known as Fushouling Station, named after the mountain it was situated in, Mt. Fushou (Fushouling).

The station was completed in 1970 along with the rest of Phase 1 of Line 1, and was officially put into operation in March 1973. Since the station was not open to the public, after its completion, its site code, No.53, was used as the official name of the station. In the dispatching system of the Beijing Rail Transit Command Center, the station was called Wusan Station.

In 1988, the new building of the metro technical school was completed near the entrance of Station 52. In order to facilitate the students of the technical school to go to and from school, two Line 1 trains operated to and from here, with one in the morning and one in the evening every weekday. The train continues to carry passengers after arriving at Pingguoyuan Station, stops at Station 52, and arrives to this station as its final stop. Technical school students board by showing their student cards. According to the internal regulations of the subway, Station 52 and 53 are non-operational stations and outsiders are not allowed to enter and take the train. However, local villagers often violate the rules and take the train.

Since Station 53 is close to the Gaojing Community and both its entrance and exit are located within Courtyard No. Jia-32 (甲32号), Gaojing (高井), "Gaojing Station" became a colloquial name for the station. The Shijingshan District Government and Beijing Morning Post also call it "Gaojing Station". "Fushouling Station" has now become the most common name for Station 52, and in September 2023, it has become the name that Station 52 will take when it opens to the public.

Starting from May 28, 2007, commuter trains no longer run, and Station 53 was closed again.

For training security staff in the then-upcoming 2008 Beijing Olympics, a train was parked inside Gaojing Station to simulate an urban transit environment, and the installed fake station nameplates read "Xiyuan Station" (西苑站). It is unclear if this was an effort to replicate the Xiyuan station on Line 4 which opened in 2009.

In the 2022 Shijingshan District Work Plan, Line 1 Gaojing Station Activation Plan Preliminary Study was mentioned.

== Structure ==
This station is located in the Western Hills. It has a 2-track island platform. The South track is connected to Sanjiadian Railway Station via the 491 line, but the 491 line was long since disused and its tracks were lifted in 2010. The entry method is complicated and dangerous (the station is located in a military-controlled area). The station is completely different in structure from passenger stations. The platform is relatively narrow, the walls inside the station are painted white lime, the ceiling is low, and the lighting facilities are relatively simple.
