= Fenzhongsi =

Transportation node and subway station in Beijing

Coordinates: 39.8538°N 116.4537°E

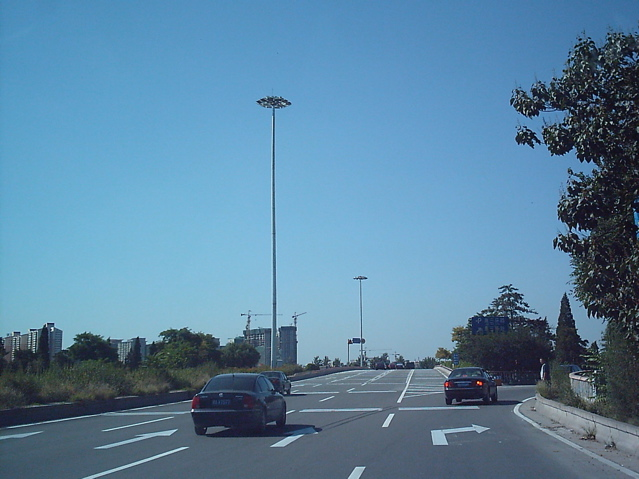
Fenzhongsi

Fenzhongsi (simplified Chinese: 分钟寺; traditional Chinese: 分鐘寺; pinyin: Fēnzhōngsì) is located in Fengtai District, Beijing. It is the starting point of the Jingjintang Expressway to Langfang, Tianjin and Binhai New Area. The area has been served by Fenzhongsi station of the Beijing Subway since the end of 2012. Fenzhongsi lies on the southeastern segment of the 3rd Ring Road.
