= Fenzhongsi station =

Beijing Subway station

Fenzhong Si 分钟寺
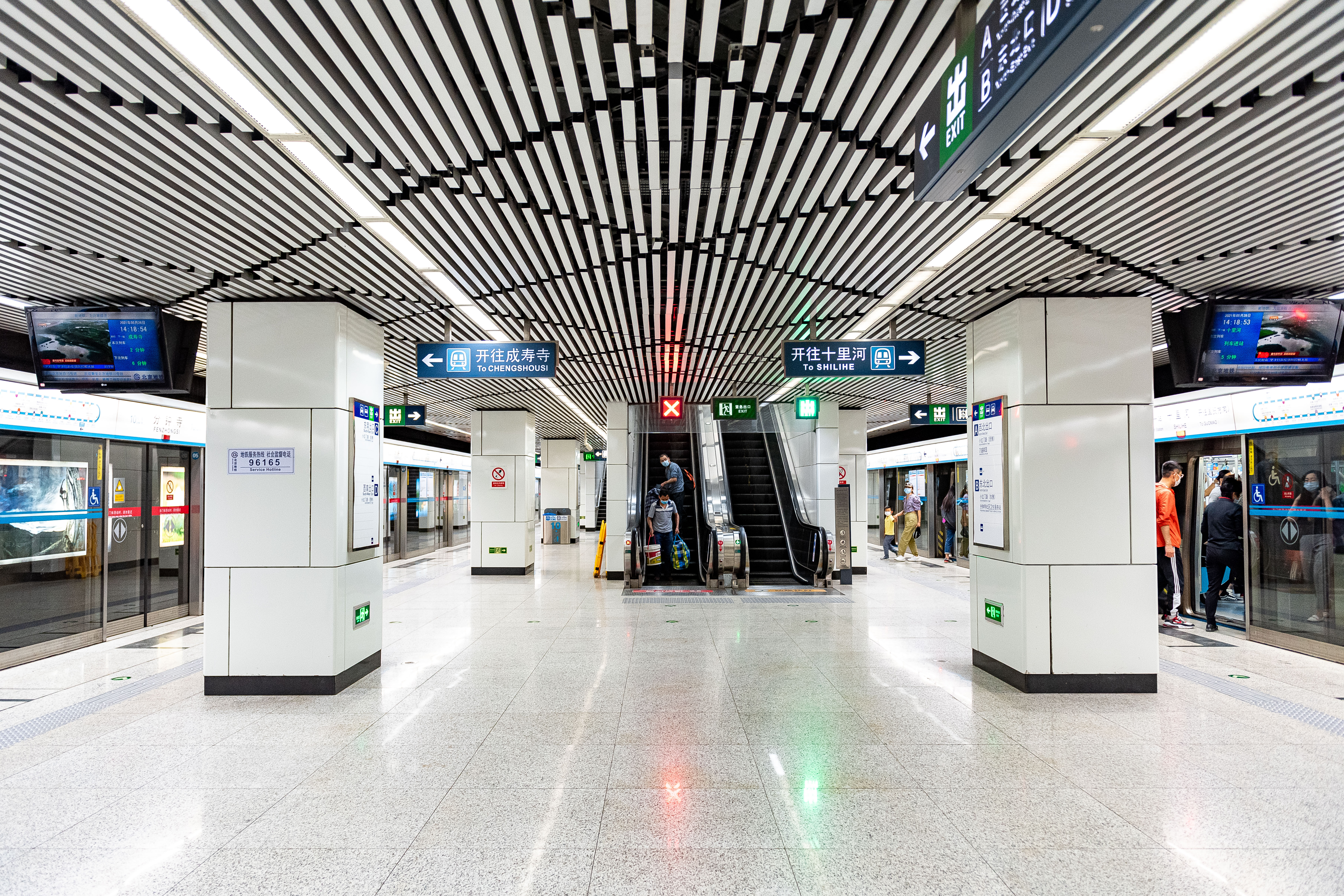
- Platform

General information
- Location: Xiaohongmen Road (小红门路); Dongtiejiangying Subdistrict, Fengtai District, Beijing; China
- Coordinates: 39°51′08″N 116°27′14″E
- Operator: Beijing Mass Transit Railway Operation Corporation Limited
- Line: Line 10
- Platforms: 2 (1 island platform)
- Tracks: 2

Construction
- Structure type: Underground
- Accessible: Yes

History
- Opened: December 30, 2012; 13 years ago

Services
Preceding station	Beijing Subway	Following station
Shilihe outer loop / anticlockwise	Line 10	Chengshou Si inner loop / clockwise
Location
- Location within Beijing

Fenzhong Si station(simplified Chinese: 分钟寺站; traditional Chinese: 分鐘寺站; pinyin: Fēnzhōng Sì zhàn) is a subway station on Line 10 of the Beijing Subway. The station opened on 30 December 2012. The station is located in Fengtai District's Fenzhongsi, after which it is named.

== Station layout ==
The station has an underground island platform.

== Exits ==
There are 4 exits, lettered A, B, C, and D. Exits A and C are accessible.
