= Chengshousi station =

Beijing Subway station

Chengshou Si 成寿寺
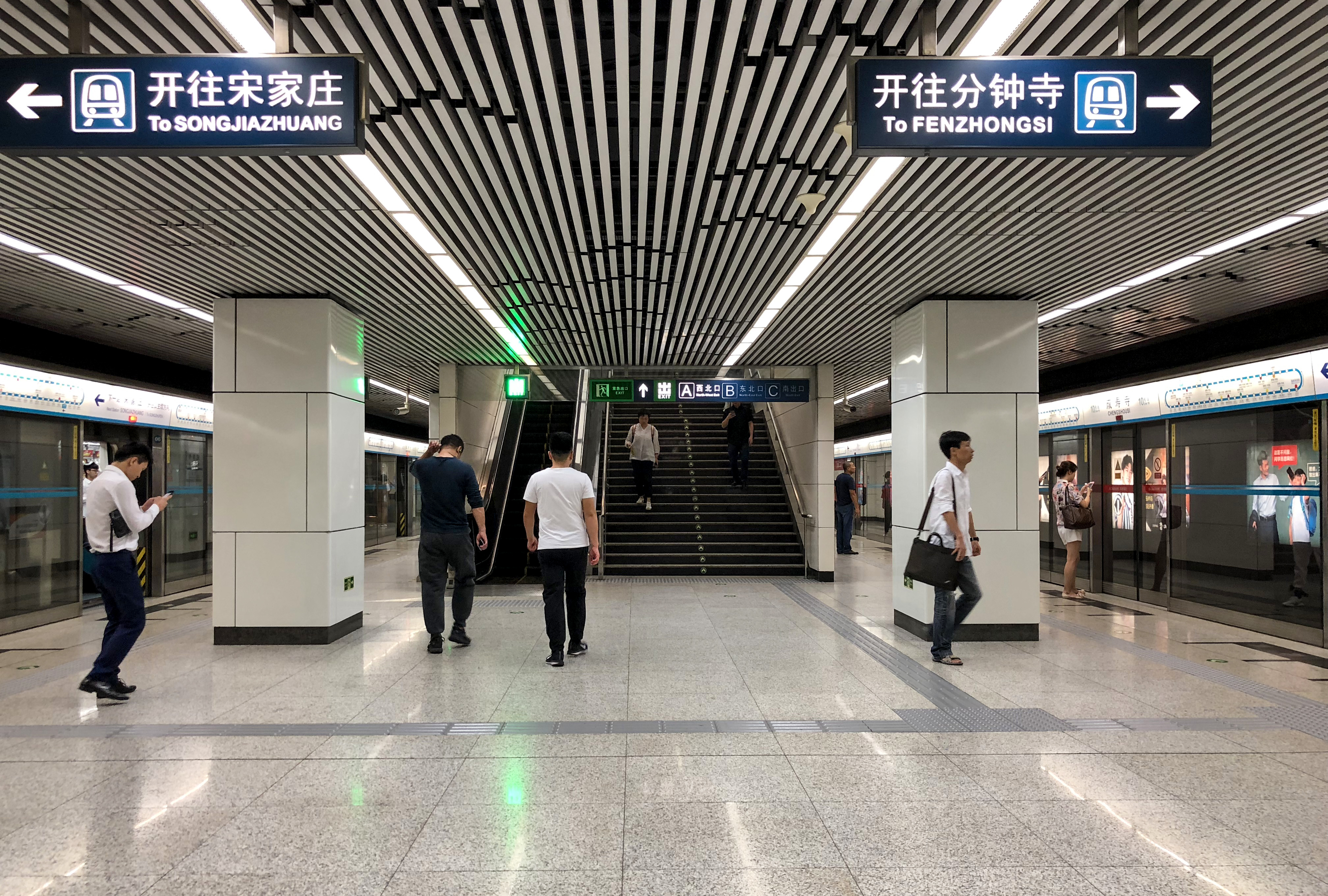
- Platform

General information
- Location: Chengshousi Road (成寿寺路); Chaoyang District, Beijing; China
- Coordinates: 39.8459°N 116.4475°E
- Operator: Beijing Mass Transit Railway Operation Corporation Limited
- Line: Line 10
- Platforms: 2 (1 island platform)
- Tracks: 2

Construction
- Structure type: Underground
- Accessible: Yes

History
- Opened: December 30, 2012; 13 years ago

Services
Preceding station	Beijing Subway	Following station
Fenzhong Si outer loop / anticlockwise	Line 10	Songjiazhuang inner loop / clockwise
Location
- Location within Beijing

Chengshou Si station (simplified Chinese: 成寿寺站; traditional Chinese: 成壽寺站; pinyin: Chéngshòu Sì zhàn) is a station on Line 10 of the Beijing Subway. This station opened on December 30, 2012.

== Station layout ==
The station has an underground island platform.

== Exits ==
There are 4 exits, lettered A, B, C1, and C2. Exit A is accessible.
