= Zhoujiazhuang station =

Beijing Subway Line 17 station

Zhoujiazhuang 周家庄
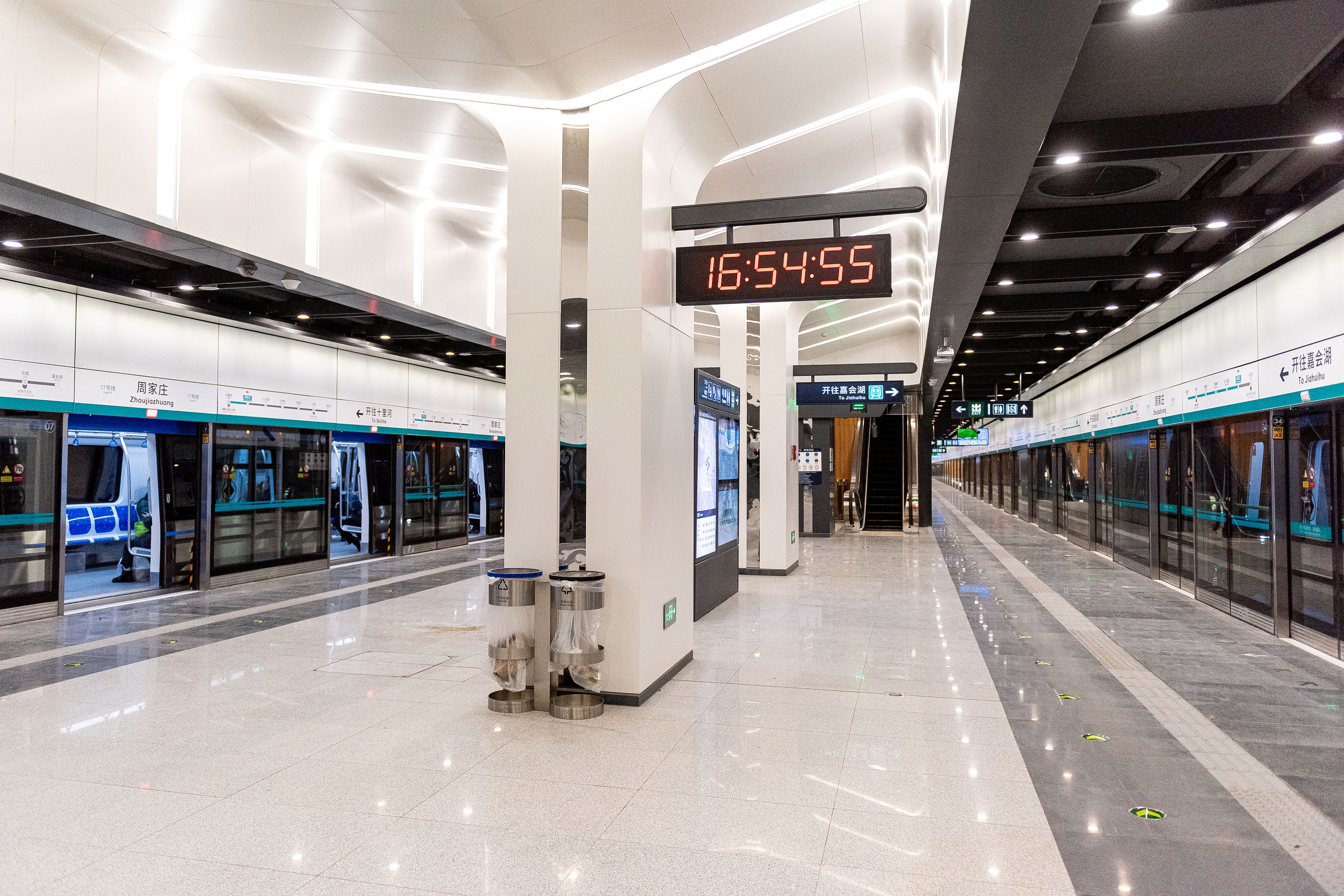
- Platform

General information
- Location: Intersection of Dayangfang Road (大羊坊路) and Minlong East Road (闽龙东路); Zhoujiazhuang Village, Shibalidian Township, Chaoyang District, Beijing; China
- Coordinates: 39°51′18″N 116°28′14″E
- Operator: Beijing MTR
- Line: Line 17
- Platforms: 2 (1 island platform)
- Tracks: 2

Construction
- Structure type: Underground
- Accessible: Yes

History
- Opened: December 31, 2021; 4 years ago

Services
| Preceding station | Beijing Subway | Following station |
|---|---|---|
| Shilihe towards Weilaikexuechengbei (Future Science City North) | Line 17 | Shibalidian towards Jiahuihu |
Location
- Location within Beijing

Zhoujiazhuang station (Chinese: 周家庄站; pinyin: Zhōujiāzhuāng zhàn) is a subway station on Line 17 of the Beijing Subway. The station opened on December 31, 2021.

== Features ==
The station has an underground island platform. There are 4 exits, lettered A, B, C and D. Exits A and C are accessible via elevators.

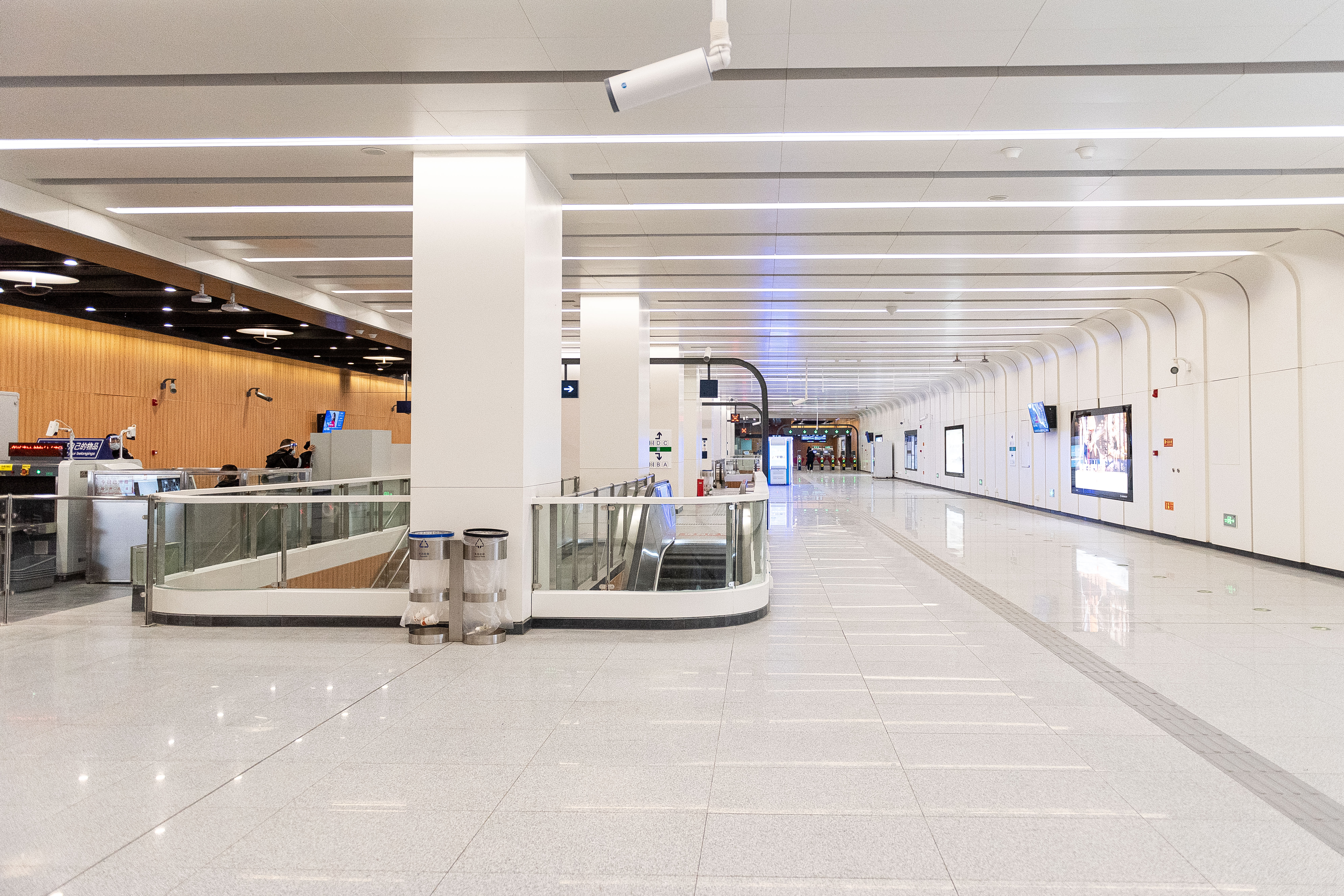
Concourse
