= Middle Ring Road (Tianjin) =

Road network in Tianjin, China

The Middle Ring Road (simplified Chinese: 中环线; traditional Chinese: 中環線; pinyin: Zhōng huánxiàn) is a system of ring roads partly encircling the core of Tianjin. It is inside the Outer Ring Road, and encircles the Inner Ring Road. Originally, the road was not divided and has many traffic lights, but has interchanges at major roads. Today, most segments of the road has been upgraded to expressway standards, with the exception of the section that it shares with the Outer Ring Road in the northeast.

== History ==
The Middle Ring Road's construction was divided into two stages: western and eastern. The western stage from Qinjian Bridge (勤俭桥) to Guanghua Bridge (光华桥) was completed between 20 January and 20 June 1985. The western part of the system began serving traffic on 1 July 1985. It received the National Quality Engineering Award (国家优质工程银质奖) in 1986. The western part is 18.6 km (11.6 mi).

The eastern part from Guanghua Bridge to Qinjian Bridge was constructed between December 1985 and 20 June 1986. The eastern part of the system began serving traffic on 1 July 1986. It received the National Quality Engineering Award in 1988. The full system is 34.5 km (21.4 mi).

Hu Xihua (胡习华) designed the Zhongshanmen Butterfly Interchange (中山门蝶式立交桥 part of the system. Deng Xiaoping, the leader of China, and Li Ruihuan, the Mayor of Tianjin praised Hu.
