= Shibalidian station =

Beijing Subway Line 17 station

Shibalidian 十八里店
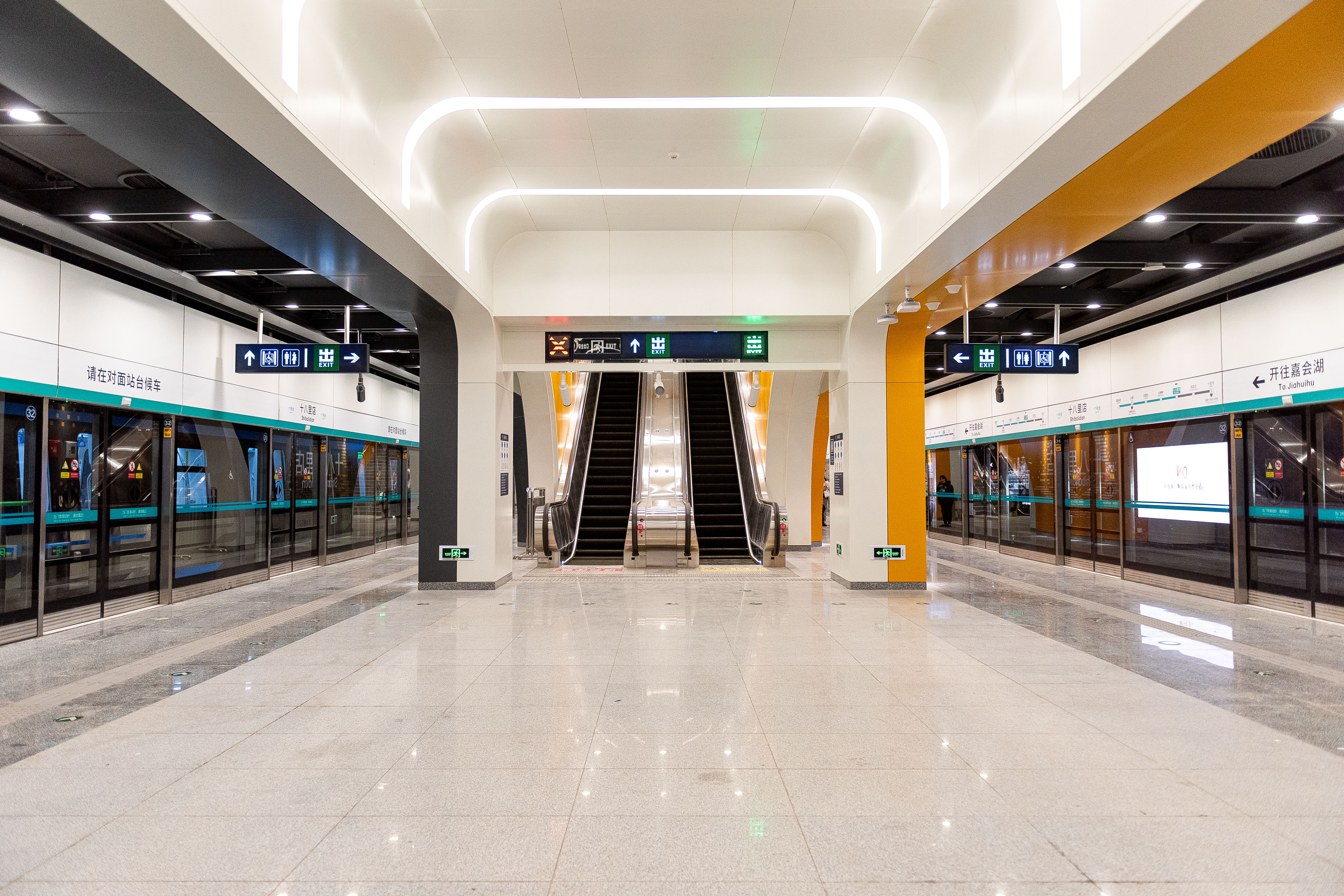
- Southbound platform (towards Jiahuihu)

General information
- Location: Shibalidian Village (十八里店村); Shibalidian, Chaoyang District, Beijing; China
- Coordinates: 39°50′36″N 116°29′22″E
- Operator: Beijing MTR
- Line: Line 17
- Platforms: 4 (2 island platforms)
- Tracks: 3

Construction
- Structure type: Underground
- Accessible: Yes

History
- Opened: December 31, 2021; 4 years ago

Services
Preceding station	Beijing Subway	Following station
Zhoujiazhuang towards Weilaikexuechengbei (Future Science City North)	Line 17	Beishenshu towards Jiahuihu
Location
- Location within Beijing

Shibalidian station (Chinese: 十八里店站) is a subway station on Line 17 of the Beijing Subway. The station opened on December 31, 2021.

== Features ==
The station has 2 underground island platforms with a track in the middle. There are 3 exits, lettered A, C and D. Exits A and C are accessible via elevators.

== Gallery ==
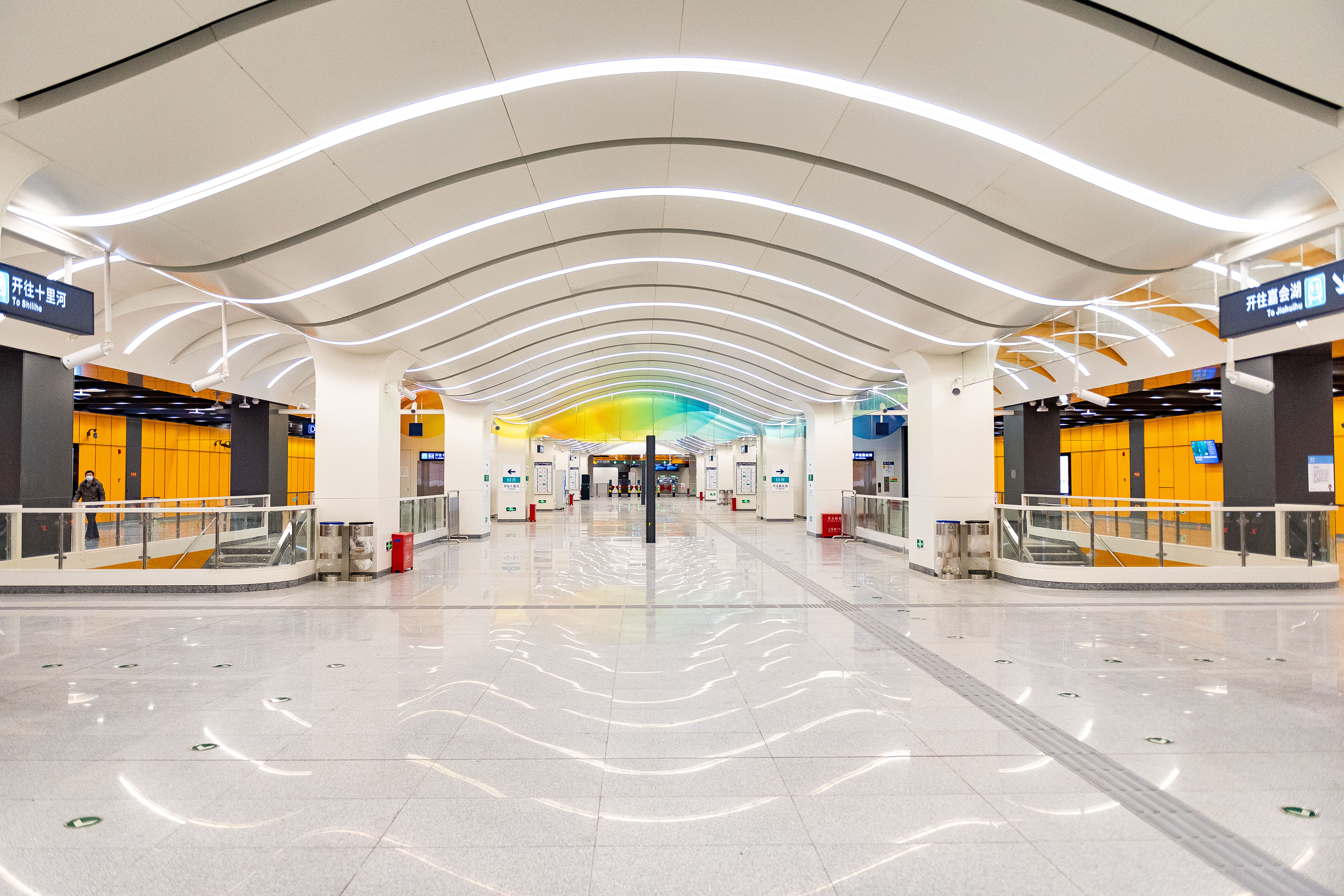
Concourse

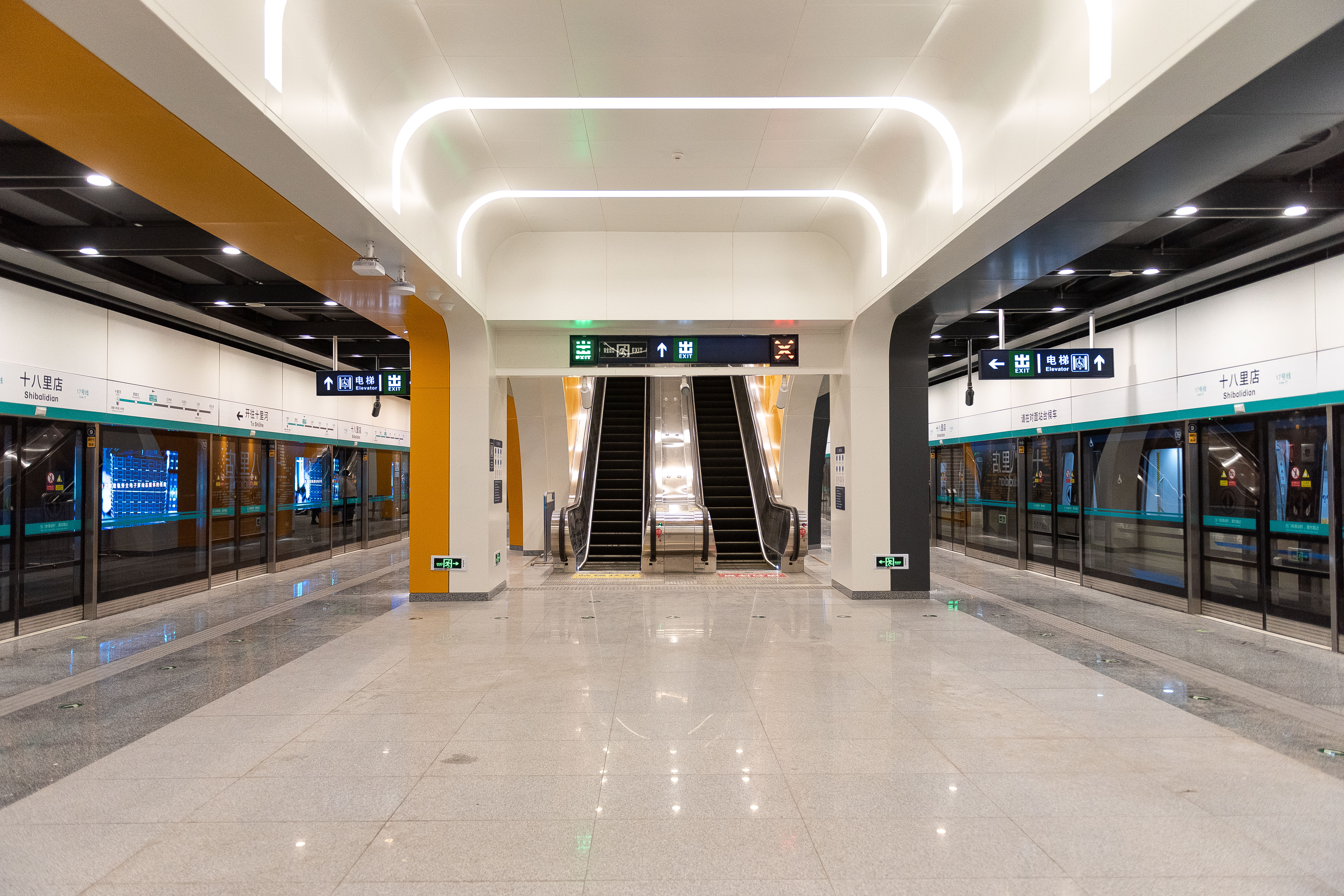
Northbound platform (towards Shilihe)
