= Outer Ring Road (Tianjin) =

Ring road in Tianjin, China

Outer Ring Road
- Chinese: 天津外環線

Route information
- Length: 71 km (44 mi)

Location
- Country: China
- Province: Tianjin

Highway system
- Transport in China

The Outer Ring Road in Tianjin, China is a city express road. It is 71.322 kilometres in length, which encircles Tianjin municipality.

Although its distance markers indicate its status as an expressway-grade road, it is not, strictly speaking, an expressway, as it has at-grade crossings, a low speed limit (60 km/h or 80 km/h), and even traffic lights.

The Jinghu, Jinbin, Jingjintang, Baojin and Jinji Expressways are all linked by this ring road. Major China National Highways and roads to Zibo, Tangshan, Wuxi and other nearby localities, as well as to other regions in the municipality, are also linked.
