= Sanjiadian railway station =

Railway station in Beijing, China

Coordinates: 39.9501°N 116.1137°E

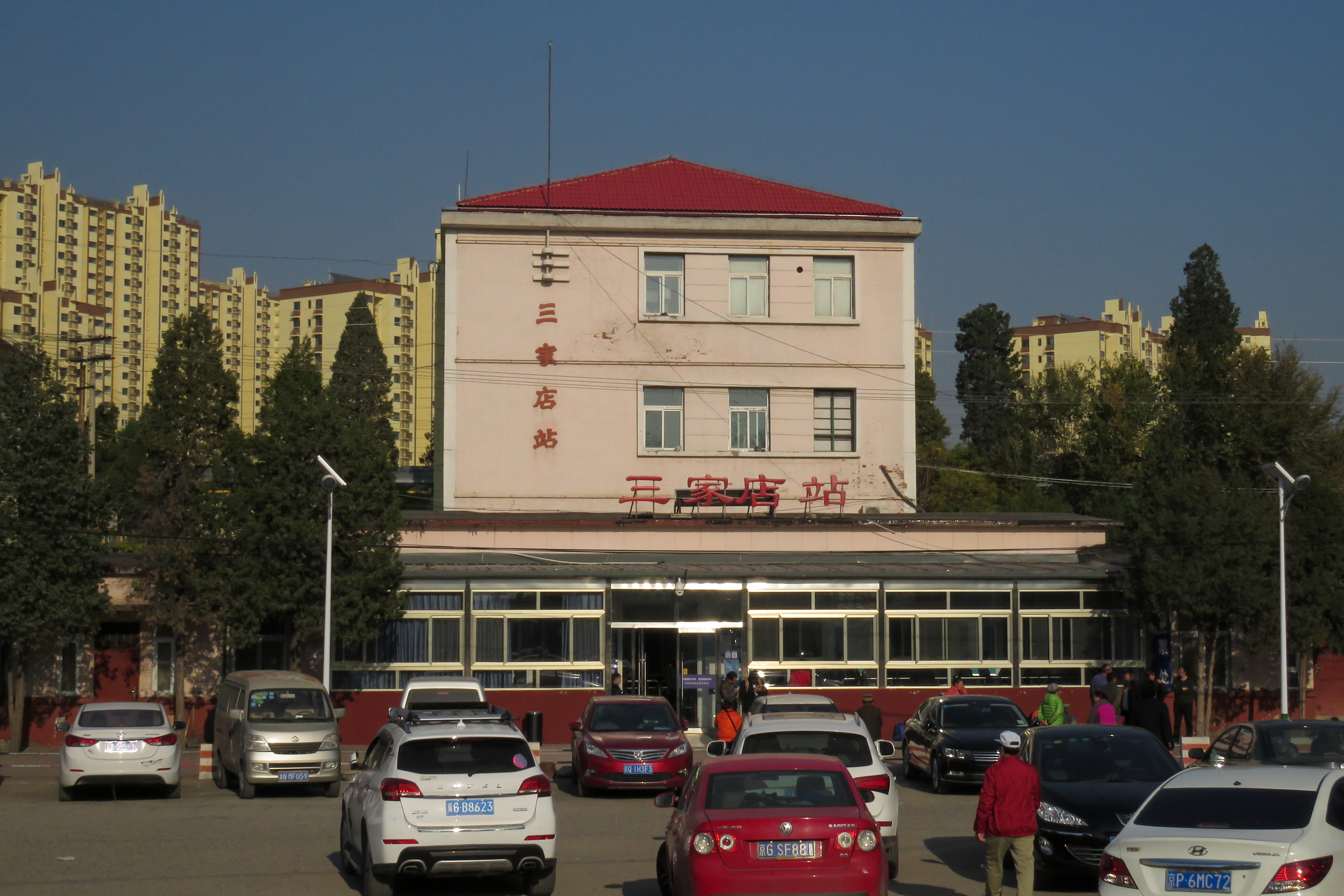
Sanjiadian railway station in 2017

Sanjiadian railway station (Chinese: 三家店站; pinyin: Sānjiādiàn zhàn) is a railway station in Mentougou District, Beijing on the Fengtai–Shacheng railway, Beijing–Mentougou railway and Beijing Northwest Ring railway. It was opened in 1907.

== Future development ==
A commuter rail service on Beijing–Mentougou railway plans to renovate Sanjiadian railway station.
