= Shibalidian Township =

Shibalidian Township 十八里店乡
- Township
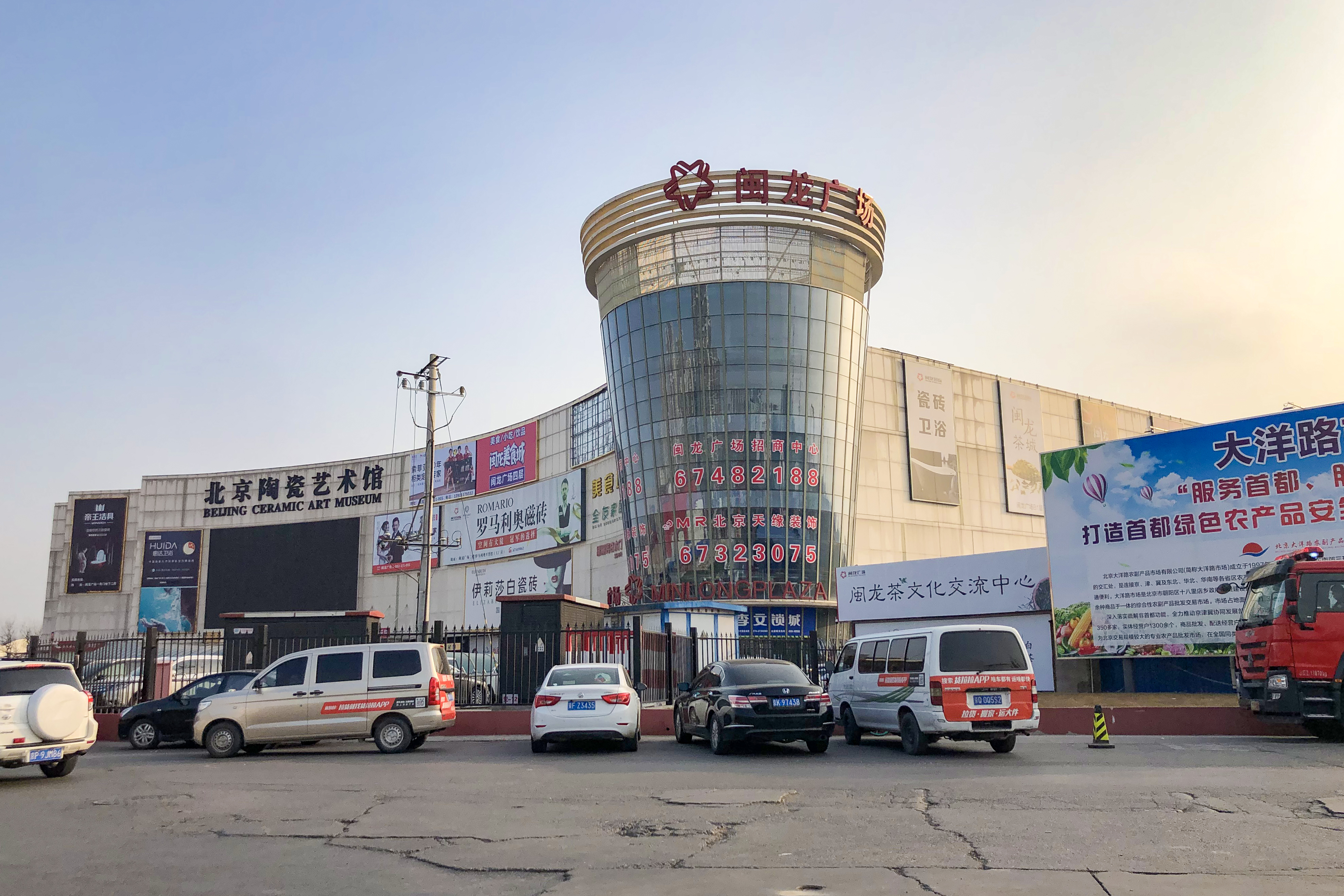
- Minlong Plaza on the northwest of the township, 2021

- Location within Beijing Location within China
- Coordinates: 39°50′58″N 116°28′37″E
- Country: China
- Municipality: Beijing
- District: Chaoyang
- Village-level Divisions: 8 communities 8 villages

Area
  - Total: 25.2 km^{2} (9.7 sq mi)

Population (2020)
  - Total: 178,177
  - Density: 7,070/km^{2} (18,300/sq mi)
- Time zone: UTC+8 (China Standard)
- Postal code: 100122
- Area code: 010

Shibalidian Township (Chinese: 十八里店乡; pinyin: Shíbālǐdiàn Xiāng) is a township on the southwest of Chaoyang District, Beijing, China. It borders Fatou and Panjiayuan Subdistricts as well as Nanmofang and Yusiying Townships to the north, Dougezhuang Township and Taihu Town to the east, Yizhuang Township and Beijing Economic-Technological Development Area to the south, Xiaohongmen, Nanyuan and Fangzhuang Townships to the west. As of the year 2020, it has a total population of 178,177.

The township got its name Shibalidian (Chinese: 十八里店) due to it is location 18 Lis from Zhengyangmen, a city gate on the former Beijing city wall.

== History ==
Timeline of changes in the status of Shibalidian Township
Year	Status
1949	Part of the 15th District
1952	Part of Nanyuan District
1959	Part of Chaoyang Commune
1961	Separated from Chaoyang and formed its own commune
1965	Incorporated Laojuntang Commune
1983	Restored into a township
2003	Becoming an area while retaining township status

== Administrative Divisions ==
As of 2021, there are a total of 16 subdivisions in Shibalidian, 8 of them are communities and 8 are villages:

Administrative Division Code	Community Name in Simplified Chinese	Community Name in English	Type
110105028013	老君堂	Laojuntang	Community
110105028015	弘善家园第二	Hongshan Jiayuan Di'er	Community
110105028016	弘善家园第一	Hongshan Jiayuan Diyi	Community
110105028017	弘善家园第三	Hongshan Jiayuan Disan	Community
110105028018	周庄嘉园第一	Zhouzhuang Jiayuan Diyi	Community
110105028019	十八里店第一	Shibalidian Diyi	Community
110105028020	弘善寺	Hongshansi	Community
110105028021	祁庄	Qizhuang	Community
110105028200	十八里店	Shibalidian	Village
110105028201	吕家营	Lüjiaying	Village
110105028202	十里河	Shilihe	Village
110105028203	周家庄	Zhoujiazhuang	Village
110105028204	小武基	Xiaowuji	Village
110105028205	老君堂	Laojuntang	Village
110105028206	横街子	Hengjiezi	Village
110105028207	西直河	Xizhihe	Village

== Transport ==
- Shilihe station (Lines 10, 14, 17)
- Zhoujiazhuang station (Line 17)
- Shibalidian station (Line 17)

== See also ==
- List of township-level divisions of Beijing
