= Beijing–Pinggu Expressway =

Road in Beijing, China

Jingping Expressway
- Jīngpíng Gāosùgōnglù 京平高速公路
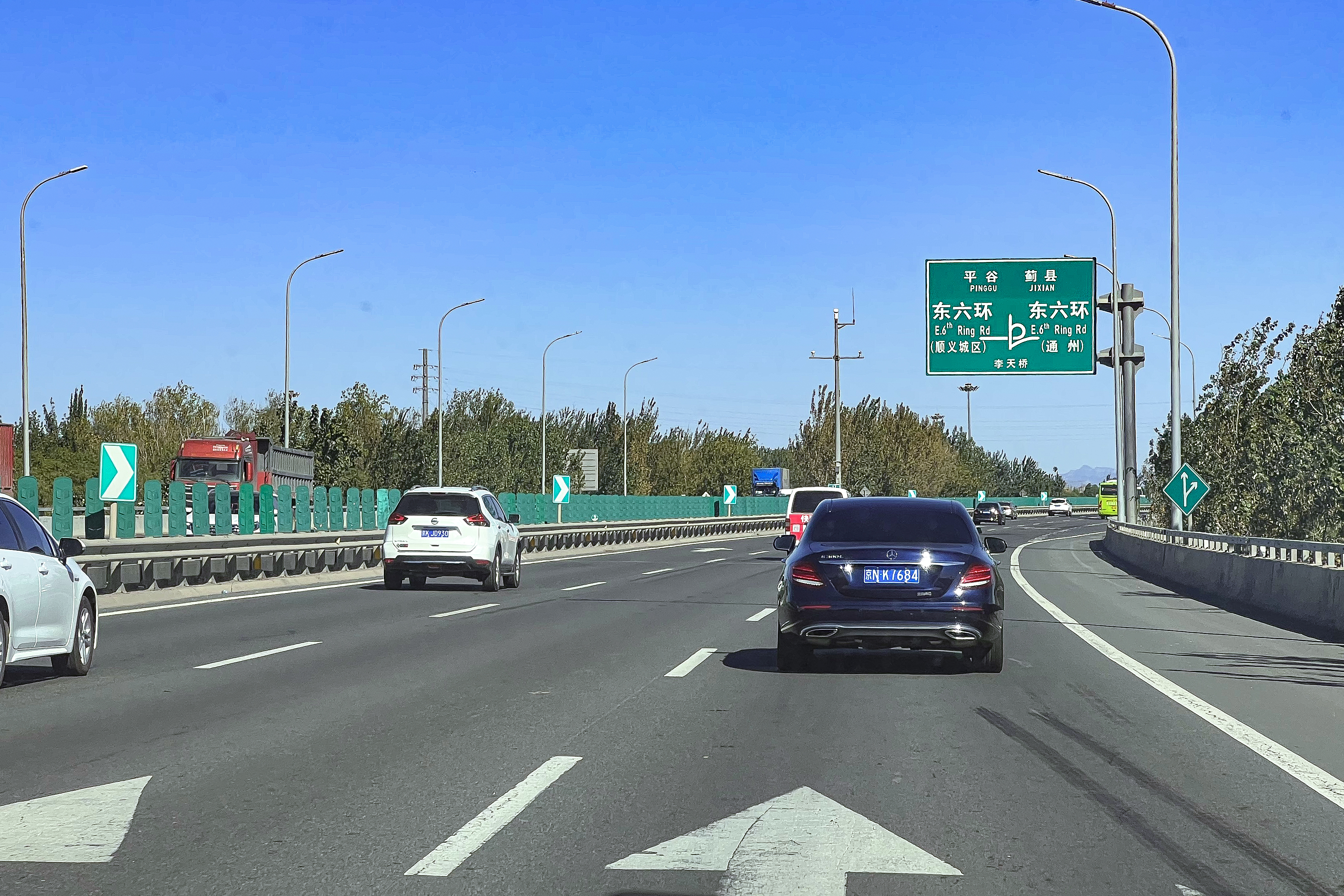

Route information
- Length: 72.83 km (45.25 mi)
- Existed: 21 June 2008–present
- Component highways: Beijing S3201

Major junctions
- From: Shunyi District, Beijing
- To: Pinggu District, Beijing

Location
- Country: China
- Major cities: Beijing

Highway system
- Transport in China

S32 Jingping Expressway (Chinese: 京平高速公路; pinyin: Jīngpíng Gāosùgōnglù) is an expressway in Beijing, China.

== History ==
The highway began construction in August 2006, and opened on June 21 2008. It was planned for the highway to be tolled for the first 15 years of operation, and the tolls were removed on September 8 2023.
