= 2-hydroxymuconate tautomerase =

Class of enzymes

Identifiers
- EC no.: 5.3.2.6

Databases
- IntEnz: IntEnz view
- BRENDA: BRENDA entry
- ExPASy: NiceZyme view
- KEGG: KEGG entry
- MetaCyc: metabolic pathway
- PRIAM: profile
- PDB structures: RCSB PDB PDBe PDBsum
Search
- PMC: articles
- PubMed: articles
- NCBI: proteins

2-hydroxymuconate tautomerase (EC 5.3.2.6, 4-oxalocrotonate tautomerase, 4-oxalocrotonate isomerase, cnbG (gene), praC (gene), xylH (gene)) is an enzyme with systematic name (2Z,4E)-2-hydroxyhexa-2,4-dienedioate keto-enol isomerase. This enzyme catalyses the following chemical reaction

(2Z,4E)-2-hydroxyhexa-2,4-dienedioate $\rightleftharpoons$ (3E)-2-oxohex-3-enedioate

Involved in the meta-cleavage pathway for the degradation of phenols, modified phenols and catechols.
