= Yongledian =

Yongledian Town 永乐店镇
- Town
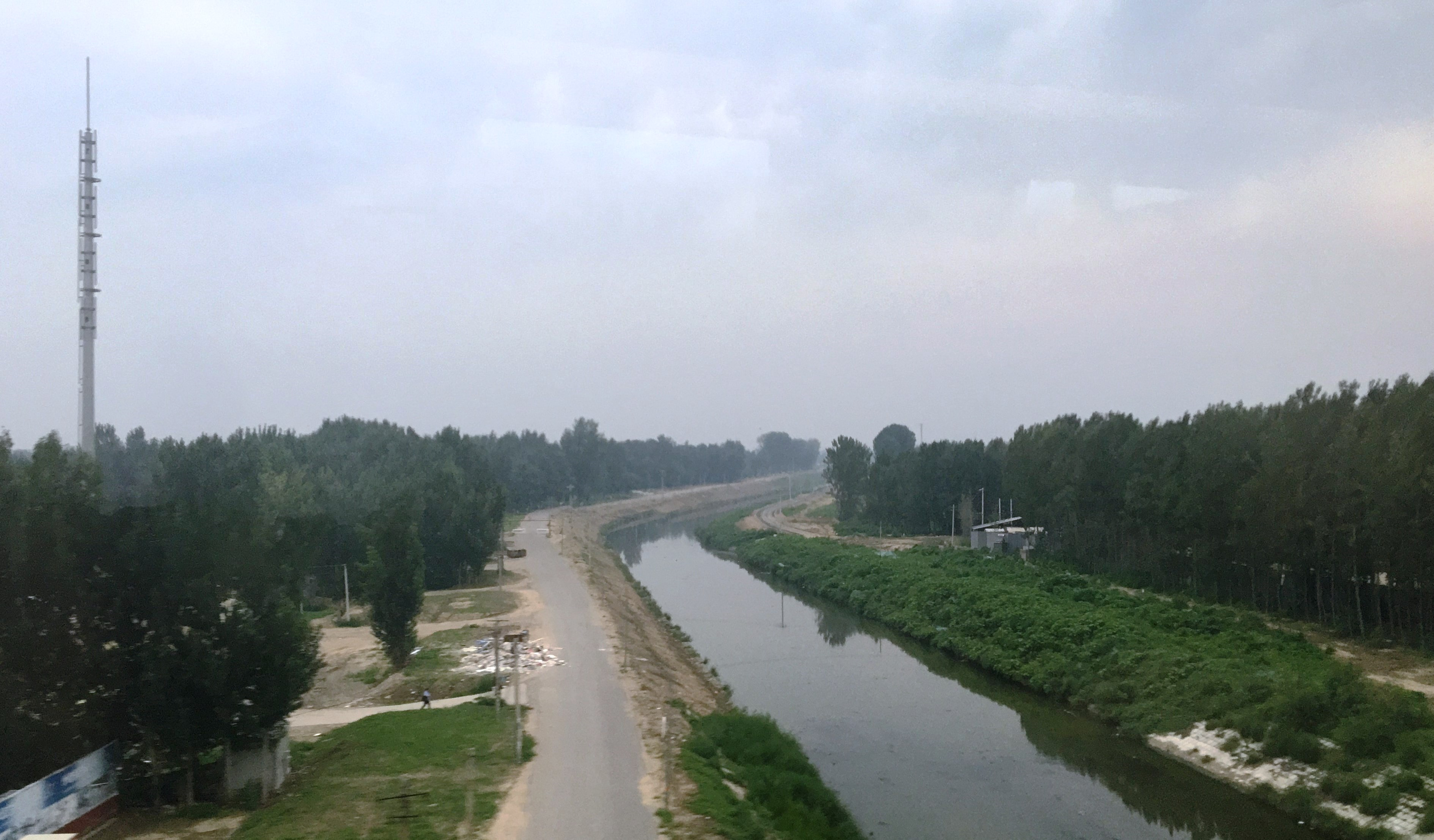
- Fenggang Jian River south of the town, 2017

- Location within Beijing Location within China
- Coordinates: 39°42′28″N 116°47′25″E
- Country: China
- Municipality: Beijing
- District: Tongzhou
- Village-level Divisions: 38 villages

Area
  - Total: 104.68 km^{2} (40.42 sq mi)

Population (2020)
  - Total: 43,308
  - Density: 413.72/km^{2} (1,071.5/sq mi)
- Time zone: UTC+8 (China Standard)
- Postal code: 101105
- Area code: 010

Yongledian Town (simplified Chinese: 永乐店镇; traditional Chinese: 永樂店鎮; pinyin: Yǒnglèdiàn Zhèn) is a town in southeastern Tongzhou District, Beijing, China. It borders Huoxian Town in the north, Gaocun Town in the east, Nanjianta Town in the south, Caiyu Town and Yujiawu Hui Township in the west. The population of Yongledian was 43,308 as of 2020.

The town was named in honor of Yongle Emperor of Ming dynasty in 1403.

== History ==
History of Yongledian Town
Year	Status	Under
1914 – 1948	9th Autonomous District; 10th Autonomous District	Tong County
1948 – 1956	4th District	Tong County
1956 – 1964	Yongle Township	Tong County
1964 – 1984	Yongledian People's Commune	Beijing Bureau of Farmlands
1984 – 1998	Yongledian Township	Tong County and Beijing Bureau of Farmlands
1998 – 2000	Yongledian Township	Tongzhou District
2000–present	Yongledian Town (Incorporated Xiaowu Township in 2000, Chaichangtun Town in 2001)	Tongzhou District

== Administration divisions ==
As of 2021, Yongledian Town was divided into 38 villages:

Administrative division code	Subdivision names	Name transliteration
110112117201	永乐店一村	Yongledian Yicun
110112117202	永乐店二村	Yongledian Ercun
110112117203	永乐店三村	Yongledian Sancun
110112117204	新西庄	Xinxizhuang
110112117205	陈辛庄	Chenxinzhuang
110112117206	邓庄	Dengzhuang
110112117207	后甫	Houfu
110112117208	东张各庄	Dong Zhanggezhuang
110112117209	老槐庄	Laohuaizhuang
110112117210	孔庄	Kongzhuang
110112117211	大羊	Dayang
110112117212	小南地	Xiao Nandi
110112117213	南堤寺东村	Nandisi Dongcun
110112117214	南堤寺西村	Nandisi Xicun
110112117215	小务村	Xiaowucun
110112117216	西槐庄	Xihuaizhuang
110112117217	坚村	Jiancun
110112117218	小安村	Xiao'ancun
110112117219	后营	Houying
110112117220	马合店	Mahedian
110112117221	鲁城	Lucheng
110112117222	大务	Dawu
110112117223	东河村	Dong Hecun
110112117224	西河村	Xi Hecun
110112117225	德仁务前街	Derenwu Qianjie
110112117226	德仁务中街	Derenwu Zhongjie
110112117227	德仁务后街	Derenwu Houjie
110112117228	柴厂屯	Chaichangtun
110112117229	后马坊	Hou Mafang
110112117230	前马坊	Qian Mafang
110112117231	半截河	Banjiehe
110112117232	兴隆庄	Xinglongzhuang
110112117233	三垡	Sanfa
110112117234	小甸屯	Xiaodiantun
110112117235	胡家村	Hujiacun
110112117236	应寺	Yingsi
110112117237	熬硝营	Aoxiaoying
110112117238	临沟屯	Lingoutun

== Economics ==
In 2018, the town had a tax revenue of 905 million yuan, a 22.7% increase from last year.

== See also ==
- List of township-level divisions of Beijing
