= Majuqiao =

Majuqiao Town 马驹桥镇
- Town
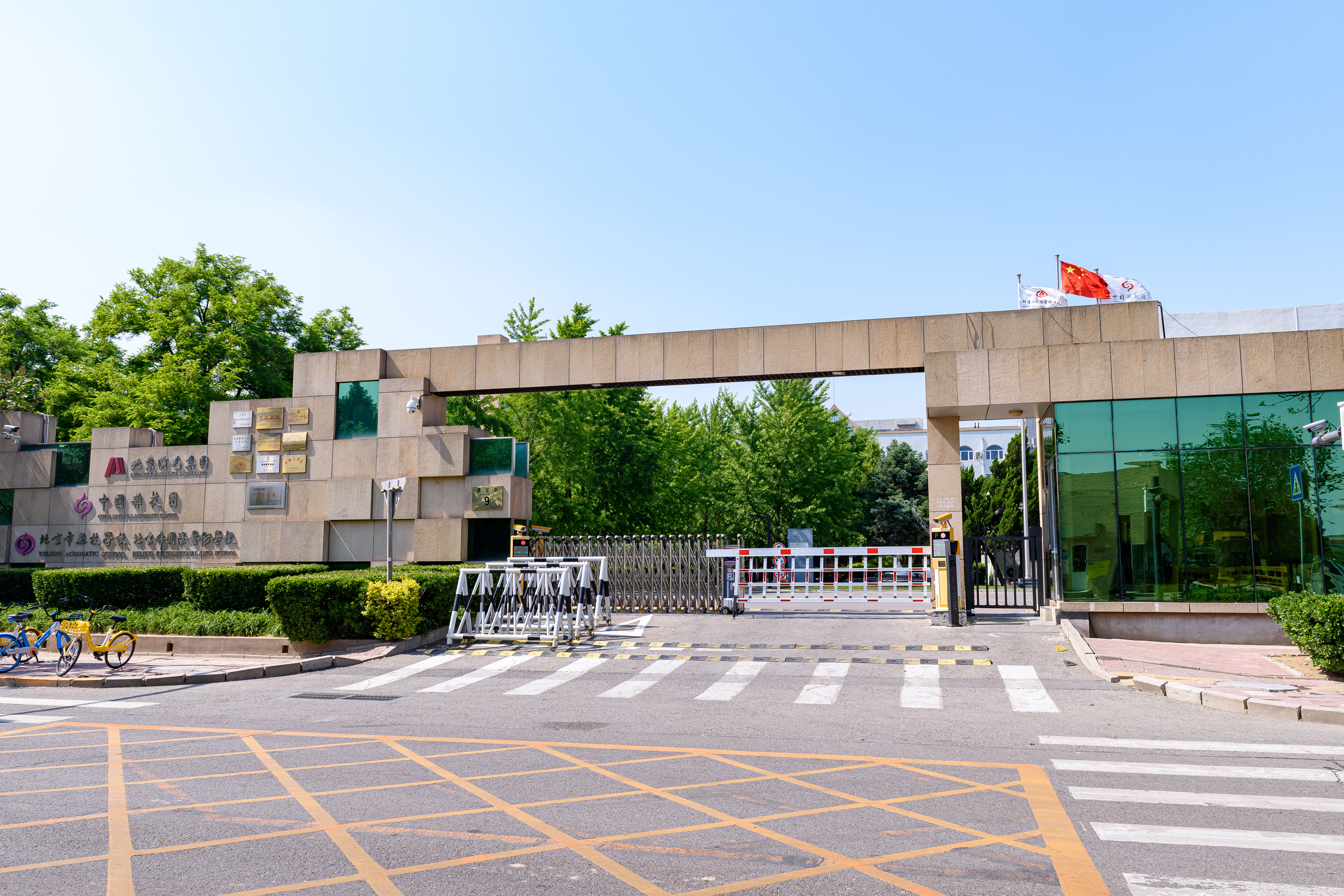
- China National Acrobatic Troupe on the north of Majuqiao, 2024

- Location within Beijing Location within China
- Coordinates: 39°44′53″N 116°33′18″E
- Country: China
- Municipality: Beijing
- District: Tongzhou
- Village-level Divisions: 10 communities 45 villages

Area
  - Total: 79.97 km^{2} (30.88 sq mi)

Population (2020)
  - Total: 175,794
  - Density: 2,198/km^{2} (5,693/sq mi)
- Time zone: UTC+8 (China Standard)
- Postal code: 101102
- Area code: 010

Majuqiao Town (Chinese: 马驹桥镇; pinyin: Mǎjūqiáo Zhèn) is a town in Tongzhou District in the southeastern suburbs of Beijing, located barely inside the 6th Ring Road and near that highway's interchange with G2 Beijing–Shanghai Expressway. As of 2020, the town was home to 175,794 residents.

Around the end of Sui dynasty, this region was part of a horse farm. The settlement around the farm was known as Majuli, and a bridge named Majuqiao (Chinese: 马驹桥; lit. 'Horse Bridge') was built across Liangshui River. The town was named after the erstwhile bridge.

== History ==
Timeline of Majuqiao Town
| Year | Status | Within |
|---|---|---|
| 1907 – 1948 | Majuqiao Township | Tong County |
| 1948 – 1958 | 7th District | Tong County |
| 1958 – 1983 | Majuqiao People's Commune | Tong County |
| 1983 – 1990 | Majuqiao Township | Tong County |
| 1990 – 1997 | Majuqiao Town | Tong County |
| 1997 – 2001 | Majuqiao Town | Tongzhou District |
| 2001–present | Majuqiao Town (Incorporated Dadushe Town in 2001) | Tongzhou District |

== Administrative divisions ==
In 2021, Majuqiao Town comprised 55 subdivisions, of which 10 were communities and 45 were villages:

| Administrative division code | Subdivision names | Name transliteration | Type |
|---|---|---|---|
| 110112109001 | 新海南里 | Xinhai Nanli | Community |
| 110112109002 | 新海北里 | Xinhai Beili | Community |
| 110112109003 | 新海祥和 | Xinhai Xianghe | Community |
| 110112109004 | 瑞晶苑 | Ruijingyuan | Community |
| 110112109005 | 宏仁 | Hongren | Community |
| 110112109006 | 国风美仑 | Guofeng Meilun | Community |
| 110112109007 | 香雪兰溪 | Xiangxue Lanxi | Community |
| 110112109008 | 富力尚悦居 | Fuli Shangyueju | Community |
| 110112109009 | 逸景家园 | Yijing Jiayuan | Community |
| 110112109010 | 兴贸北街 | Xingmao Beijie | Community |
| 110112109201 | 一街 | Yijie | Village |
| 110112109202 | 二街 | Erjie | Village |
| 110112109203 | 三街 | Sanjie | Village |
| 110112109209 | 北门口 | Beimenkou | Village |
| 110112109210 | 大葛庄 | Dagezhuang | Village |
| 110112109211 | 东店 | Dongdian | Village |
| 110112109212 | 西店 | Xidian | Village |
| 110112109213 | 西后街 | Xihoujie | Village |
| 110112109214 | 辛屯 | Xinzhuang | Village |
| 110112109215 | 大白村 | Dabaicun | Village |
| 110112109216 | 马村 | Macun | Village |
| 110112109217 | 小白村 | Xiaobaicun | Village |
| 110112109218 | 姚村 | Yaocun | Village |
| 110112109219 | 张各庄 | Zhanggezhuang | Village |
| 110112109220 | 古庄 | Guzhuang | Village |
| 110112109221 | 杨秀店 | Yangxiudian | Village |
| 110112109222 | 周营 | Zhouying | Village |
| 110112109223 | 小张湾 | Xiaozhangwan | Village |
| 110112109224 | 房辛店 | Fangxindian | Village |
| 110112109225 | 张村 | Zhangcun | Village |
| 110112109226 | 郭村 | Guocun | Village |
| 110112109227 | 柴务 | Chaiwu | Village |
| 110112109228 | 大周易 | Da Zhouyi | Village |
| 110112109229 | 小周易 | Xiao Zhouyi | Village |
| 110112109230 | 史村 | Shicun | Village |
| 110112109231 | 前银子 | Qian Yinzi | Village |
| 110112109232 | 后银子 | Hou Yinzi | Village |
| 110112109233 | 驸马庄 | Fumazhuang | Village |
| 110112109234 | 南堤 | Nandi | Village |
| 110112109235 | 大杜社 | Dadushe | Village |
| 110112109236 | 团瓢庄 | Tuanpiaozhuang | Village |
| 110112109237 | 后堰上 | Hou Yanshang | Village |
| 110112109238 | 前堰上 | Qian Yanshang | Village |
| 110112109239 | 姚辛庄 | Yaoxinzhuang | Village |
| 110112109240 | 陈各庄 | Chengezhuang | Village |
| 110112109241 | 南小营 | Nanxiaoying | Village |
| 110112109242 | 西田阳 | Xi Tianyang | Village |
| 110112109243 | 东田阳 | Dong Tianyang | Village |
| 110112109244 | 小杜社 | Xiaodushe | Village |
| 110112109245 | 六郎庄 | Liulangzhuang | Village |
| 110112109246 | 西马各庄 | Xi Magezhuang | Village |
| 110112109247 | 小松垡 | Xiao Songfa | Village |
| 110112109248 | 大松垡 | Da Songfa | Village |
| 110112109249 | 神驹 | Shenju | Village |
| 110112109250 | 柏福 | Bofu | Village |

== Gallery ==
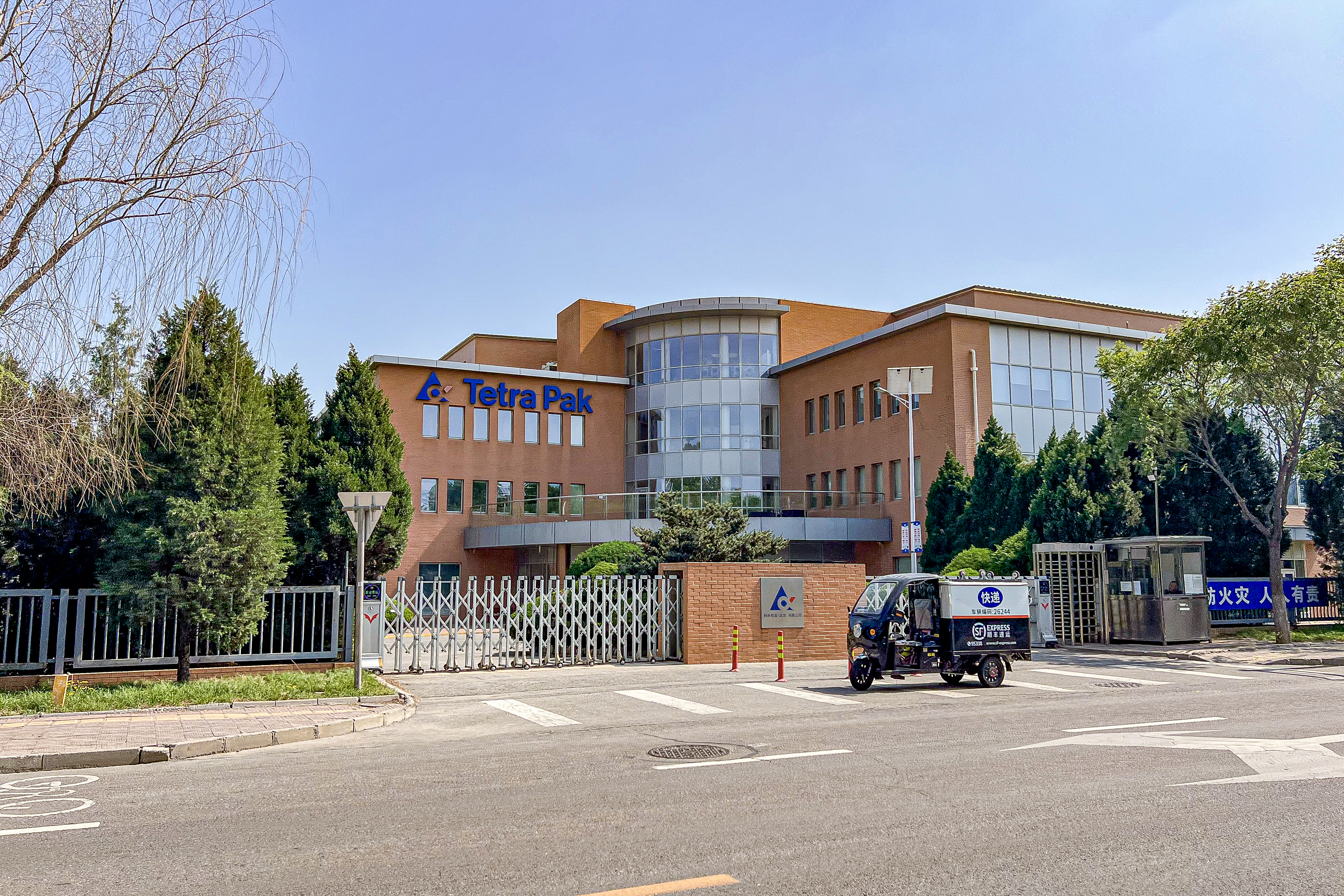
Tetra Pak Beijing Corporation

== See also ==
- List of township-level divisions of Beijing
