= Ring roads of Beijing =

Ring Roads encircling Beijing, China

Map of Beijing's ring roads in city limits (click/expand to see the outermost ring roads that extend outside city limits)

Beijing possesses multiple ring roads.

== Historical context ==
After the Marco Polo Bridge Incident of 1937, the Japanese army occupied Peking city and renamed it ‘Beijing’. The 1938 Beijing Urban Plan Outline was compiled soon after by the Japanese, emphasizing the construction of the West and East sides outside the old city of Peking, and also proposing the concept of a ‘ring-and-radial’ road layout.

During the 8 years that the Japanese army occupied Peking City, they managed to construct extensions of Chang’an Avenue, thereby facilitating transportation between new commercial districts in the western and eastern suburbs.

In the 1950s, the Chinese government invited the Soviet Union to send a team of 9 urban planning experts to assist Beijing in formulating its urban plan. Through the 5 years from 1953-1958 of cooperation, they put together three versions of Beijing’s Overall Urban Development Plan, adjusting the four radial routes and five ring roads. During this time, Beijing experienced a large-scale urban construction under the instruction of Beijing’s Overall Urban Development Plan, and the ‘ring-and-radial’ road network layout was thus finalized. Beijing city did not experience any major urban adjustment after 1958.

=== Ring roads overview ===
The First Ring Road was formed by widening and renovating existing roads within Beijing’s old city. Its construction was gradually finalized along with the process of old-city reconstruction. Several subway lines were built beneath this ring road, which are now today’s Beijing Subway Lines 4, 5, and 7.

The Second Ring Road, in the 1953-1958 editions of Beijing’s overall urban development plan, it was originally designed to follow the outer edge of the city wall, running along the moat. In 1969, under wartime conditions, the city walls were demolished for subway construction. Later, an urban expressway (now the second ring road) was built above the subway, and was completed and fully functional in September 1992. It became not only Beijing’s first urban ring expressway but also China’s first fully enclosed and signal-free urban ring road.

The Third Ring Road was the first ring road to begin construction. Its eastern, southern, and northern sections were completed successively during 1958-1960. However, the western segment—passing through Yuyuantan Park—was difficult to build and remained unfinished for years. In the early 1980s, the western section was rerouted westward, and after numerous adjustments, the entire ring was officially completed and operated as an expressway in 1994.

The Fourth Ring Road began construction before the 1990 Asian Olympics in Beijing and was fully opened to traffic in 2001.

== Functions and geography ==
	Main functions	Geographical coverage
Second ring road	Historical sites, culture and politics center	Old sites of Beijing city walls
Third ring road	Business, finance and education institutions	Central business district and residential areas
Fourth ring road	Modern business and technological development	Modern business and residential areas
Fifth ring road	Residence and heavy industry	New residential areas and industrial factories
Sixth ring road	Modern logistics and agriculture	Sub-urban districts

== Demographic distribution ==
Defined by the People’s Government of Beijing Municipality, the idea of ‘central urban area’ of Beijing consists of six districts: Dongcheng, Xicheng, Chaoyang, Haidian, Fengtai, and Shijingshan, with a total surface area of 1378 square kilometers (compared to the total area of Beijing Municipality of 16,410 square kilometers), mostly within the fifth ring road.

With only 8.4% of Beijing Municipality's total area, the central urban area has 68.7% of Beijing’s employment positions (With Chaoyang and Haidian being the highest with 19.0% and 22.6% respectively, both districts are within the fourth ring road of Beijing) and 56.8% of Beijing’s total employed population.

== Layout ==
Beijing's road structure is influenced by the historical development patterns of its inner city, focused on the Forbidden City.

The first through fourth ring roads of Beijing are generally symmetrical and square. Its outer ring roads are generally more circular.

== 1st Ring Road ==
When the city of Beijing had tram lines in operation from the 1920s to the 1950s, Line No. 4's route formed a ring-shaped loop, running 17-km clockwise through Tiananmen - Xidan - Xisi - Ping'anli - Dianmen - Gulou - Jiaodaokou - Beixinqiao - Dongsi - Dongdan - Tiananmen. This route was known as the "Ring Road" (環形路). After the tramlines were removed in the 1950s, this name lost its meaning as it was simply a collection of surface streets (in contrast, each of the other ring roads today is a single expressway). Plans in 1954 and 1957 show a different "1st Ring Road", a slightly larger rectangular loop between Beixinqiao - Ciqikou - Caishikou - Xinjiekou. Most maps in Beijing do not actually show the 1st Ring Road as such; only very few maps give a faint yellow highlight of a possible variant of it. However, the original name remained to be used later for other ring roads constructed decades later.

The notion of "1st Ring Road" briefly reappeared after the end of the Cultural Revolution, during which the original names of the roads described above were changed to names with strong political propaganda meaning that eulogized and advocated the ideologies of the Cultural Revolution, and when the political turmoil had ended, the names changed. One suggestion was to completely rename those roads as "1st Ring Road" to symbolize the new start in the era of reform, as well as to reflect the willingness of China to embrace modernness and globalization, but this suggestion was quickly turned down because most people favored the original names of the roads and believed in their historical meaning and cultural heritage, and more importantly, they felt that returning the original names also had more symbolic meaning of denouncing Cultural Revolution. Therefore, the original names of the roads were adopted once again, and the phrase "1st Ring Road" was seldom heard again.

== 2nd Ring Road ==
Beijing's first (innermost) ring road, the 2nd Ring Road was built in the 1980s and expanded in the 1990s. It now forms a rectangular loop around central Beijing, an area that is roughly equivalent to the old city, which includes the four districts: Dongcheng District, Xicheng District, Xuanwu District and Chongwen District. Its four sections begin at Xizhimen, Dongzhimen, Caihuying and Zuo'anmen.

The 2nd Ring Road passes through very central parts of Beijing, and runs almost directly past the Beijing North railway station and Beijing railway station. Prices of real estate inside the ring road are considerably higher than other parts of the city.

The 2nd Ring Road of today is part of an extended ring road which takes the southern route through Zuo'anmen and Caihuying instead of Qianmen Road, just south of Tian'anmen. Its southernmost part between Jianguomen and Fuxingmen appears "squashed" outwards. The 2nd ring is directly connected to the Airport Expressway and Badaling Expressway.

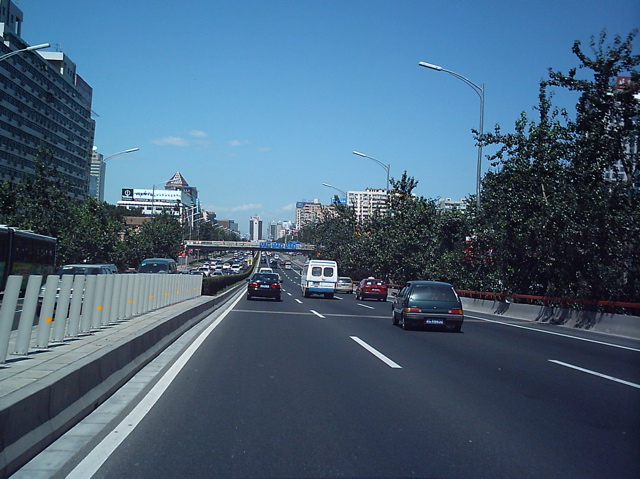
The eastern 3rd Ring Road (August 2004 image)

== 3rd Ring Road ==
The 3rd Ring Road was built in the 1980s and completed in the 1990s. It is by no means peripheral, as it passes through Beijing's Central business district and diplomatic communities (Dongzhimenwai / Liangmaqiao, Jianguomenwai). It is directly interlinked with numerous expressways—the Jingcheng Expressway, the Jingshi Expressway, the Jingkai Expressway, and the Jingjintang Expressway.

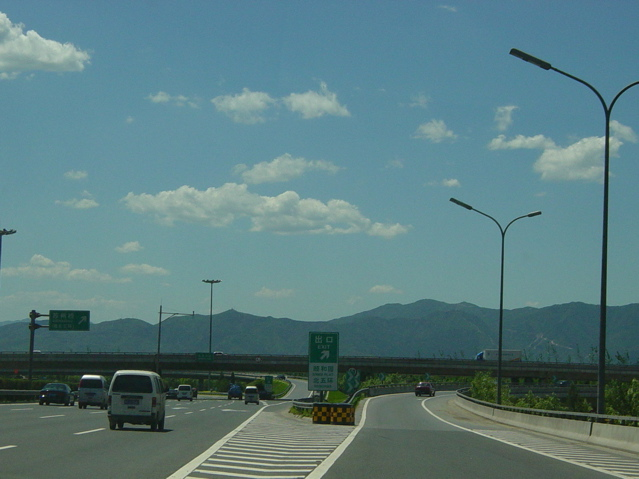
The northwestern 4th Ring Road (July 2004 image)

== 4th Ring Road ==
The 4th Ring Road was completed in 2001, around 8 km (5.0 mi) from the center of Beijing. It connects the less central parts of Beijing and navigates through Zhongguancun technology hub, western Beijing, Fengtai District, and eastern Beijing. The Jingshen Expressway and the Jingtong Expressway (as of Dawangqiao) begin from the 4th Ring Road.

The 4th Ring Road, along with other ring roads, now have a few locations where "fake" police lights (red and blue in colour) light up at night. Drivers are easily fooled into thinking that the police is out in force. This indirectly forces drivers to slow down.

== 5th Ring Road ==
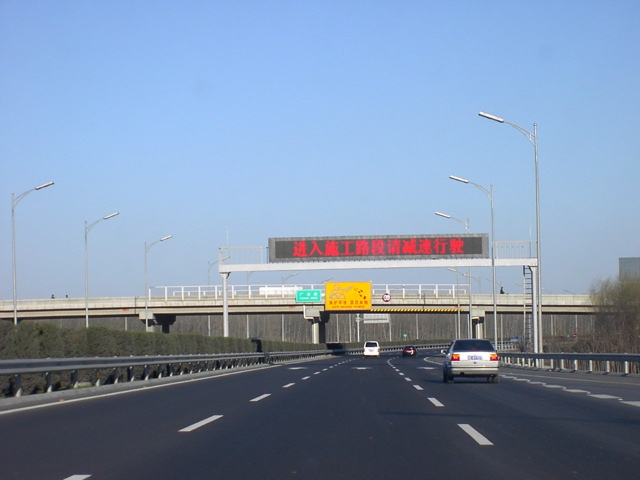
The northeastern 5th Ring Road (March 2003 image)

The 5th Ring Road is, along with the 6th Ring Road, a full expressway ring road. It is designated as a provincial expressway with number S50.

This ring road is further distant (around 10 km or 6.2 mi) from central Beijing, and links the suburban areas of Huantie, Shigezhuang, Dingfuzhuang and Ciqu. It also passes through the Yizhuang Development Area. It navigates through very barren land in the south before heading west toward the Fragrant Hills.

Due to its proximity to Olympic venues, it has been nicknamed the "Olympic Avenue". Also there is a comical Chinese song about the rings of Beijing. known as the Song of the 5th Ring Road.

== 6th Ring Road ==
At present the most remote ring road from central Beijing (around 15–20 km or 9.3–12.4 mi), the 6th Ring Road was built in the 2000s and was completed in 2010. 130 km (81 mi) of expressway between the interchanges with Badaling Expressway and Jingshi Expressway, running clockwise, are open to general motor traffic. It is the only ring road to be interlinked with the equally remote Jingha Expressway.

This toll expressway ring road links Beijing with Shunyi District, Tongzhou District, Changping District and Daxing District. It is included in the National Trunk Highway System and planned as a branch of G45 Daqing–Guangzhou Expressway, and henceforth receives the designation G45_{01}.

== 7th Ring Road ==
The G95 Capital Area Loop Expressway, also unofficially known as the 7th Ring Road, is an orbital road of about 1,000 km that encircles the city centre of Beijing, mostly passing through Hebei. Only 38 kilometers passes through Beijing, another 38 km runs through Tianjin and 924 km is in Hebei province. Construction of the road was completed in June 2018 with the final section linking Beijing's outer districts of Tongzhou and Daxing.

== Others ==
China National Highway 112 is a ring road which runs around Beijing through province of Hebei and municipality of Tianjin, completely outside of Beijing municipality. Although not popularly known as part of Beijing's "ring road system", it has been informally identified as the "8th Ring Road" by some road-trip fans.

== Inter-ring road connection routes ==
There also exist many connection routes between the ring roads. The ones listed below are all expressways or express routes. Travel on these routes is often surprisingly smooth, as there are no traffic lights on them.

11 routes are under construction as of 2004.

- Xueyuan Road (N. 4th Ring Road - N. 5th Ring Road, under projection)
- Badaling Expressway (as of N. 2nd Ring Road, expressway as of N. 3rd Ring Road, constructed)
- Jingcheng Expressway (as of N. 3rd Ring Road, partially constructed)
- Airport Expressway (as of N. 3rd Ring Road, portion connecting to N. 2nd Ring Road under construction as an express route)
- Yaojiayuan Road (E. 3rd Ring Road - N. 5th Ring Road, connecting to projected Jingping Expressway, under projection)
- Tonghui River North Road (E. 2nd Ring Road - E. 4th Ring Road, under construction as an express route)
- Jingshen Expressway (as of E. 4th Ring Road, portion connecting to E. 2nd Ring Road under construction)
- Jingjintang Expressway (as of E. 3rd Ring Road, constructed)
- Puhuangyu Road (as of S. 2nd Ring Road to S. 5th Ring Road, under construction/projection)
- Jingkai Expressway (as of S. 2nd Ring Road, expressway as of S. 3rd Ring Road, constructed)
- Fengbei Road (W. 2nd Ring Road - Jingshi Expressway (after Yuquan Road exit), under construction)
- Lianhuachi West Road (W. 3rd Ring Road - W. 6th Ring Road, opened October 15, 2005)
- Fushi Road (W. 3rd Ring Road - W. 5th Ring Road, under projection)
- Xizhimen Outer Street extension (W. 3rd Ring Road (Beijing) - W. 5th Ring Road, under construction/projection)
