= Beijing Zoo =

Zoo in Beijing, China

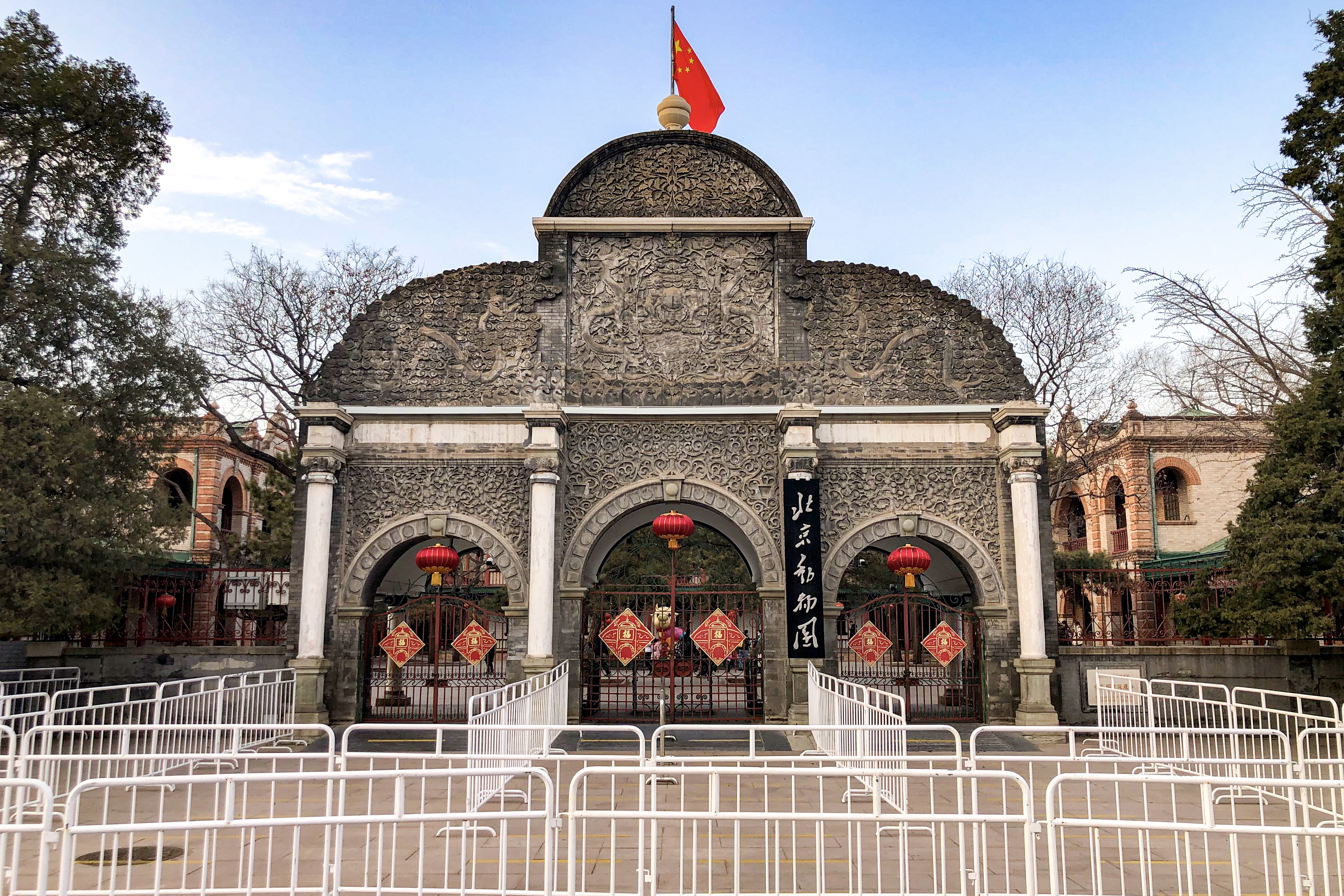
- Front gate
- Interactive map of Beijing Zoo
- 39°56′19″N 116°20′00″E
- Date opened: 19 July 1907
- Location: Xicheng District, Beijing, China
- Land area: Beijing 89 ha (220 acres)
- No. of animals: 14,500
- No. of species: 950
- Memberships: Chinese Association of Zoological Gardens (CAZG)
- Website: www.beijingzoo.com

Beijing Zoo
- Simplified Chinese: 北京动物园
- Traditional Chinese: 北京動物園
Transcriptions
Standard Mandarin
- Hanyu Pinyin: Běijīng Dòngwùyuán
- Wade–Giles: Pei-ching Tung-wu-yüan
other Mandarin
- Xiao'erjing: ﺑُﻮِٔ دٍ دْﻮ ءُ ﻳُﻮًا

Beijing Zoo is a zoological park in Xizhimen, Xicheng District, Beijing. Founded in 1906 during the late Qing dynasty, it is the oldest zoo in China and oldest public park in northern China. The zoo is also a center of zoological research that studies and breeds rare animals from various continents.

The zoo occupies an area of 89 hectares (220 acres), including 5.6 hectares (14 acres) of lakes and ponds in Xicheng District. It has one of the largest animal collections in the country. In 2015, the zoo and its aquarium had over 450 species of land animals and over 500 species of marine animals; in all, it is home to 14,500 animals.

More than five million people visit the zoo each year. Like many of Beijing's parks, the zoo's grounds resemble classical Chinese gardens, with flower beds amidst natural scenery, including dense groves of trees, stretches of meadows, small streams and rivers, lotus pools, and hills dotted with pavilions and historical buildings.

== History ==
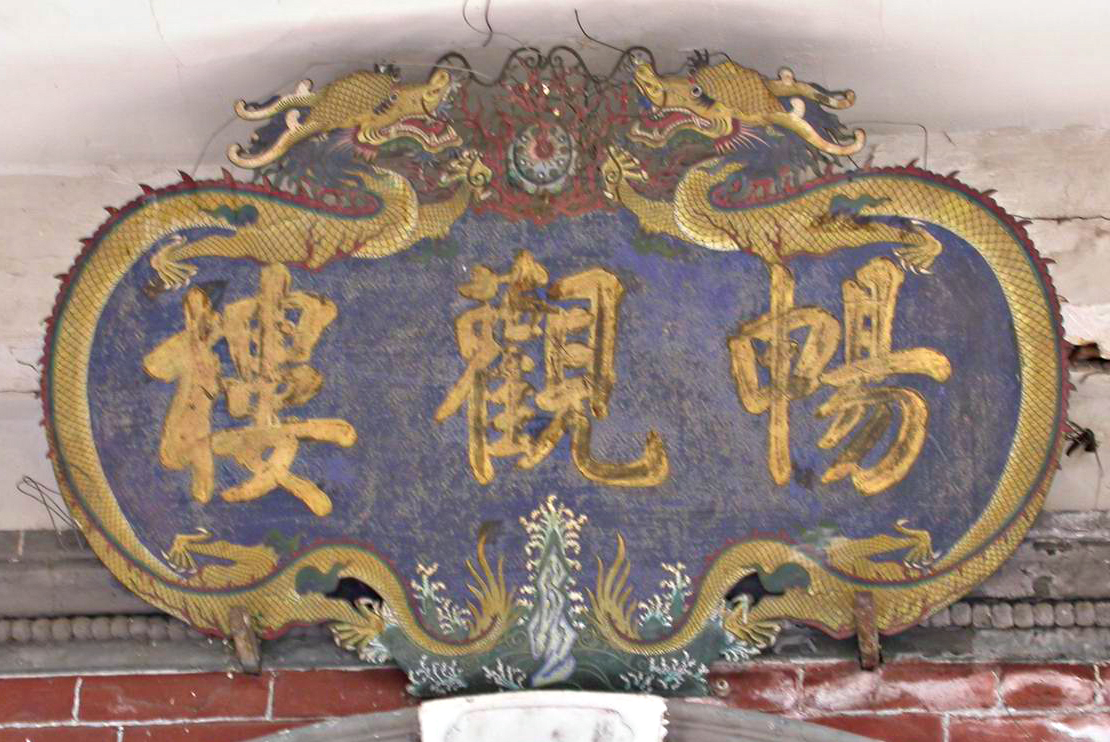
The plaque of the Changguanlou

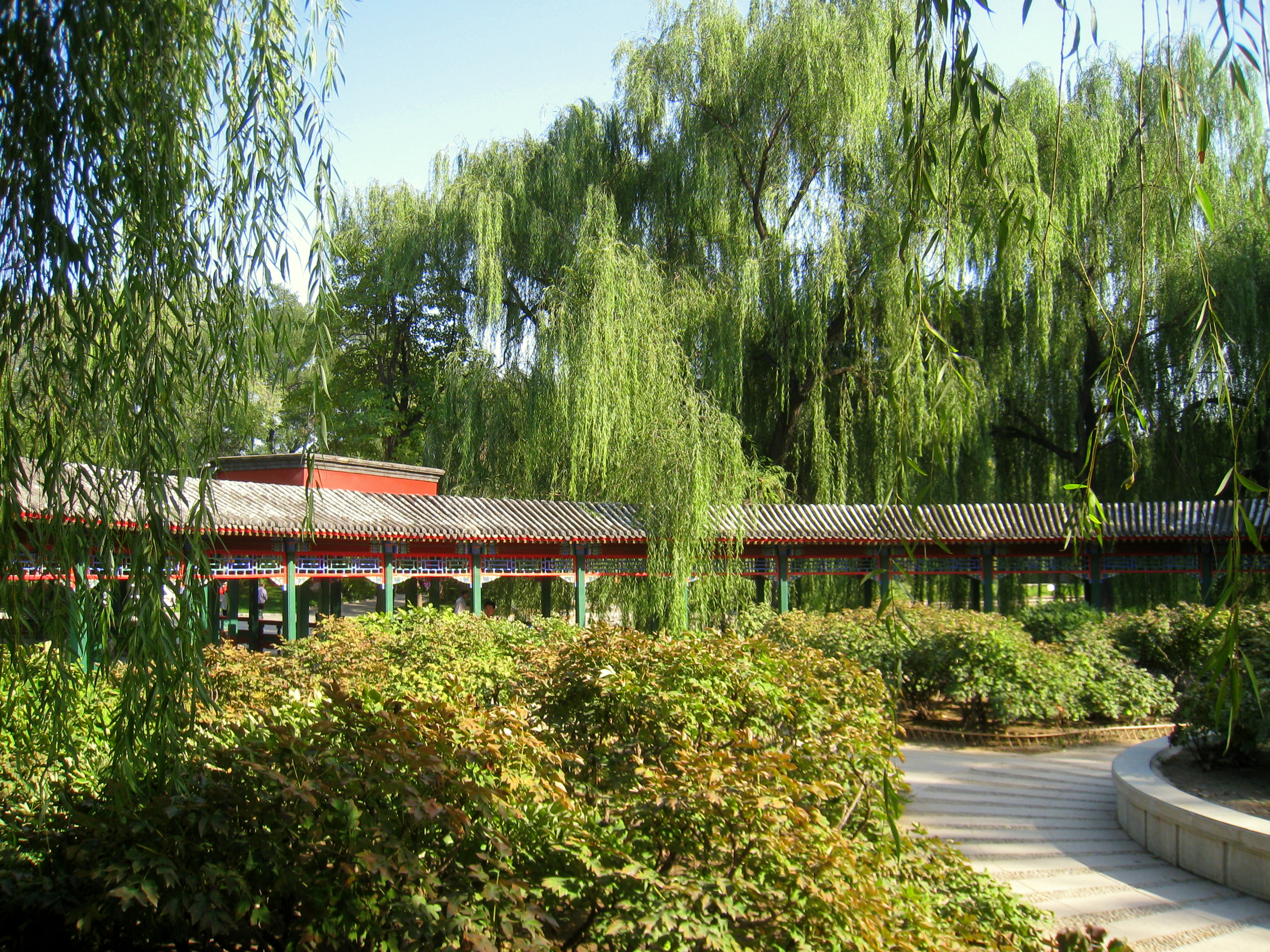
A corridor at the Beijing Zoo

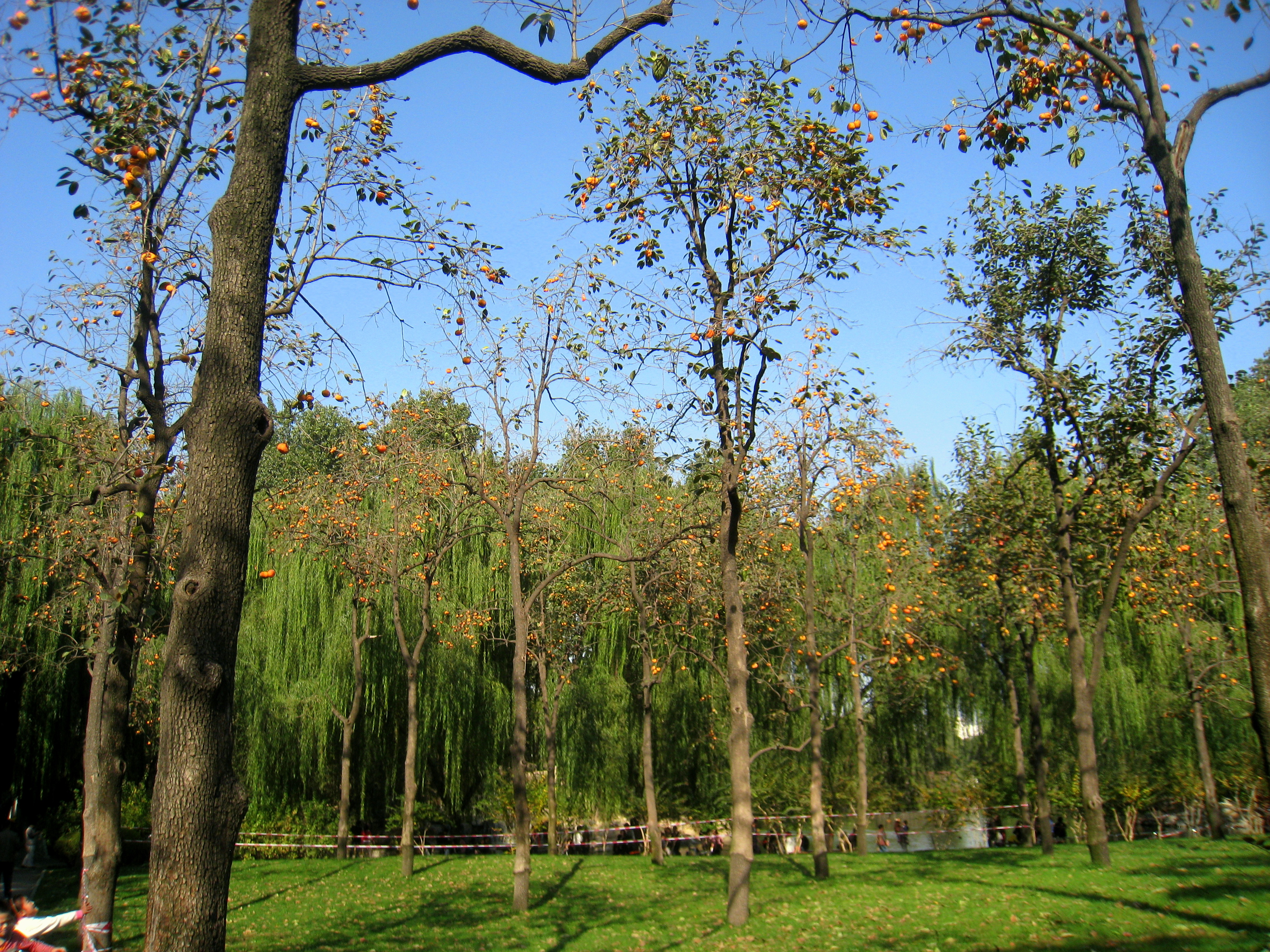
The grounds

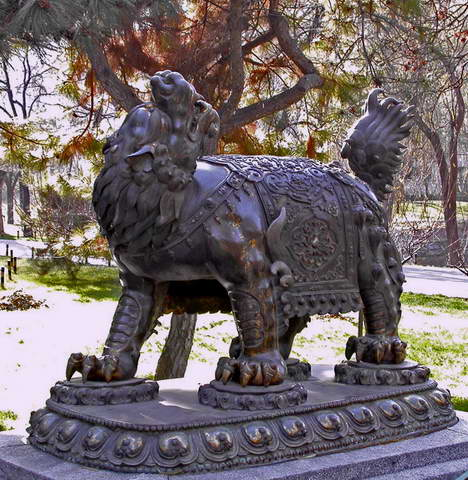
A bronze carved hou, a creature of Chinese mythology

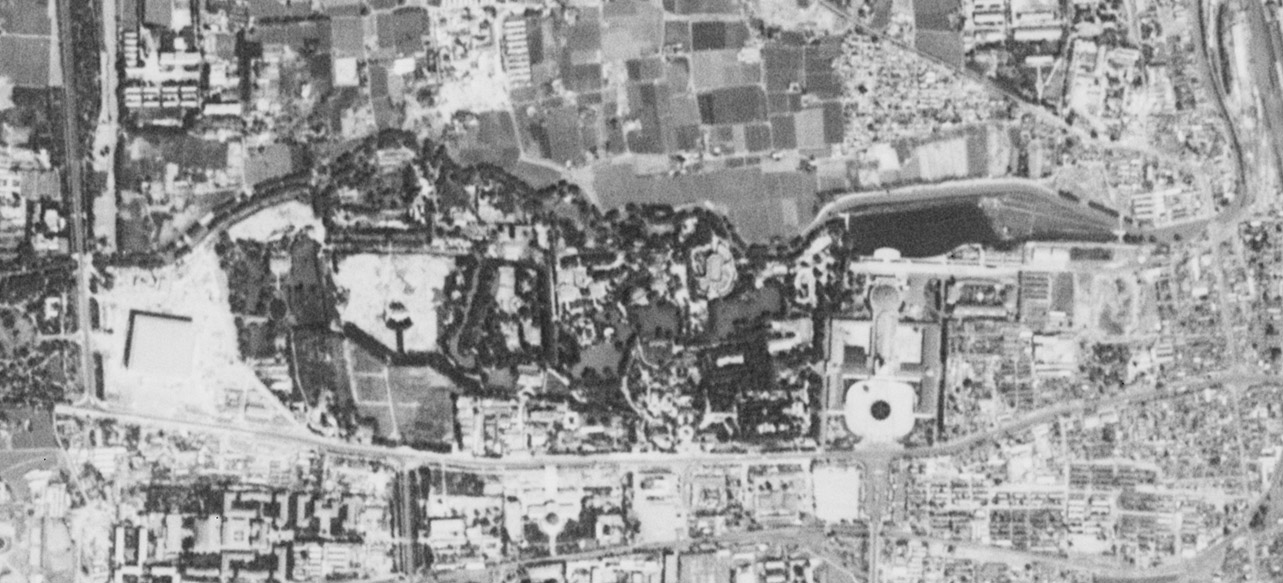
Satellite image of Beijing Zoo. (1967-09-20)

=== Imperial Era ===
The zoo grounds originally housed an imperial manor during the Ming dynasty, that became part of the estate of the general Fuk'anggan during the Qing dynasty. In 1906, the Imperial Ministry for Agricultural, Industry and Commerce established an experimental farm outside of Xizhimen on land that encompassed two gardens, the Leshan and Ji, and two temples, the Guangshan and Huining. The Experimental Farm consisted of an experimental farm, a botantical garden, a small menagerie of 1.5 hectares (3.7 acres). The experimental farm had five main experimental areas for grain, sericulture, vegetables, fruits and flowers. The menagerie was the earliest public zoo in China and the oldest public park in northern China.

Most of the animals were purchased by the Viceroy of Liangjiang, Duanfang, from Germany. The animal collection attracted great interest when the farm opened to visitors on 16 June 1908. Admission cost eight copper coins with children at half price. The Empress Dowager Cixi and the Guangxu Emperor each visited the zoo twice. The farm was known as the Wanshouyuan or the "Garden of Ten Thousand Beasts." Among the historical buildings at the zoo is Changguanlou, a Baroque-style country-palace of Empress Dowager Cixi, designed by a French architect and built in 1908. It remains one of the best preserved Western-style palaces in China.

=== Republican Era ===
After the Qing dynasty was overthrown in 1911, the zoo became a national botanical garden during the Republican period. In the 1930s, with French aid, Lamarck Hall, named after the botanist Jean-Baptiste Lamarck, was built at the experimental farm and housed plant research. During the Second Sino-Japanese War, the Japanese occupiers built the monkey mountain in 1942, but used the experimental farm as a storage depot. In 1943, the Imperial Japanese Army poisoned the zoo's six lions and two leopards, purportedly to remove potential interference with air defenses. Many other animals, including the zoo's lone Asian elephant, died of starvation. By the end of the war, only ten monkeys, rabbits, geese, two pigeons, flamingo, emu, peacock, eagle, and three parrots remained.

=== Early People's Republic ===
When Beijing became the capital of the People's Republic of China in 1949, only 13 monkeys, three parrots and an emu blind in one eye remained at the zoo. The city government renamed the zoo the Beijing Agricultural Experimentation Center the Western Suburban Park (西郊公园) and began gradually rebuilding the zoo. In 1952, national leaders Mao Zedong, Zhu De, and Ren Bishi donated their war horses to the park.

The zoo sent staff to study zoo management in the Soviet Union and Poland, and began to trade animals with Eastern Bloc countries, Burma, India, Indonesia, and Japan to expand its collection. Zoo staff used some 30 species from the zoo including South China Tiger, François' langur, Chinese alligator, python and black bear in such trades. The Moscow Zoo and Leipzig Zoo donated 14 species including African lion, polar bear, brown bear, emu and Himalayan vulture. The park was renamed the Beijing Zoo in 1955. Guo Moruo, writer and president of the Chinese Academy of Social Sciences wrote the calligraphy for the zoo's entrance sign. Leading Chinese universities also established a research presence in the zoo to study animal behavior and to breed endangered species. Giant panda was displayed at the zoo for the first time in 1955 and successfully bred by zoo staff in 1963.

New enclosures opened in the 1950s, the Lion-Tiger Mountain, Elephant House, Primate House, and Reptile House, which had specimens of over 100 species including crocodiles and pythons. In 1958, the city government approved the expansion of the zoo to 21 hectares on the north bank of the Nanchang River. In 1965, when the construction of the Capital Indoor Stadium took away 4 hectares of the zoo's land to the west, the city granted the zoo 2.3 hectares near the Ming Tombs north of the city. This land became the zoo's off-site breeding center.

The zoo's development came to an abrupt halt with the onset of the Cultural Revolution in 1966 as zoo staff were purged, research work stopped, and contacts with foreign zoos were severed. When Guo Moruo was denounced, the sign bearing his calligraphy was removed and replaced with one featuring characters pieced together from Chairman Mao's calligraphy.

In the 1970s, as China forged diplomatic relations with the Western bloc, the zoo received animal gifts from the Australia, France, Mexico, Nepal, Spain, Sri Lanka, the United Kingdom, and the United States. The zoo also organized a four-year mission to Ethiopia, Kenya, and Tanzania, which brought back 157 species and 1,000 animals including and aardvarks, African elephants, baboons, giant tortoises, giraffes, Grant's gazelles, oryxes, ostriches, Thomson's gazelles, wildebeest, and zebras.

During the 1984 Summer Olympics, the Beijing Zoo sent a pair of giant pandas, Yingxin and Yong Yong, to Los Angeles for an exhibition. In 1987, Yong Yong and Ling Ling went on exhibition at the Bronx Zoo.

== Present ==
The buildings in the zoo cover an area of more than 50,000 square meters, including the elephant hall, the lion and tiger hall, the monkey hall, the panda hall, and many others. Altogether, there are more than 30 large halls.

The Beijing Zoo maintains an active breeding program that produced 1,104 surviving offspring of 92 species in 2013, including the critically endangered Northern white-cheeked gibbon and Guizhou snub-nosed monkey. Other reproduced species in 2013 include giant pandas, golden takins, chimpanzees, De Brazza's monkeys, Patas monkeys, vervet monkeys, mantled guerezas, Bengal slow lorises, tufted capuchins, Pere David's deer and hippopatamuses.

Visitors to the zoo can also explore its many Qing dynasty buildings.

Historic buildings of the Beijing Zoo
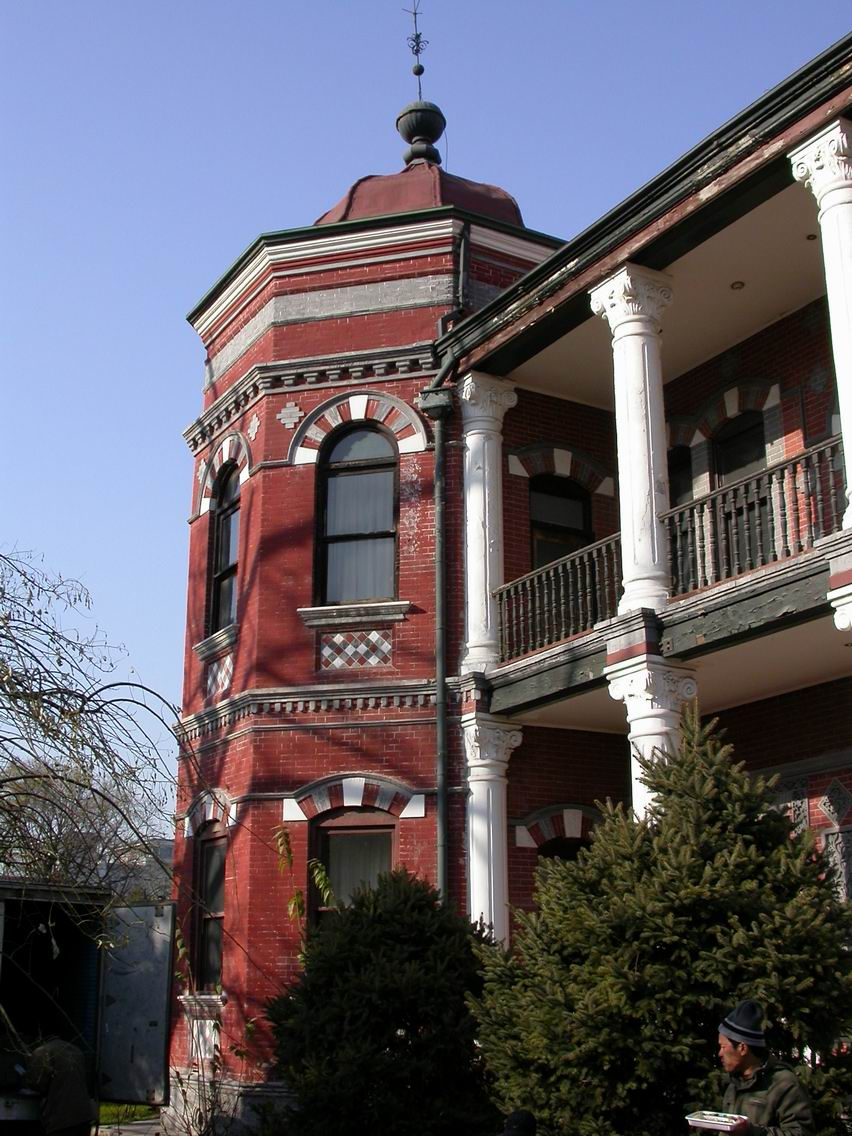
Changguanlou

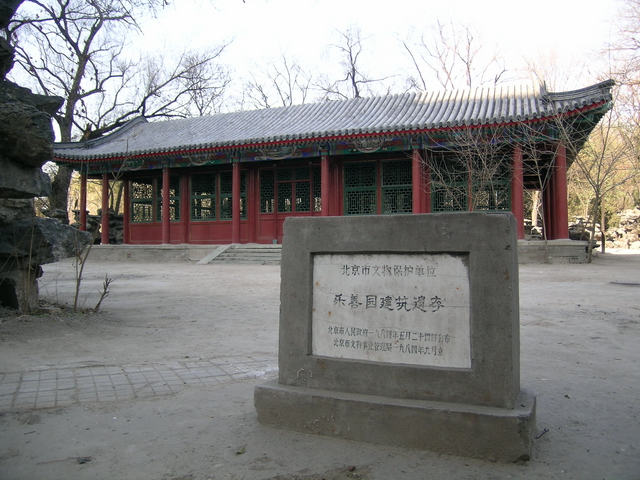
The Leshan Garden

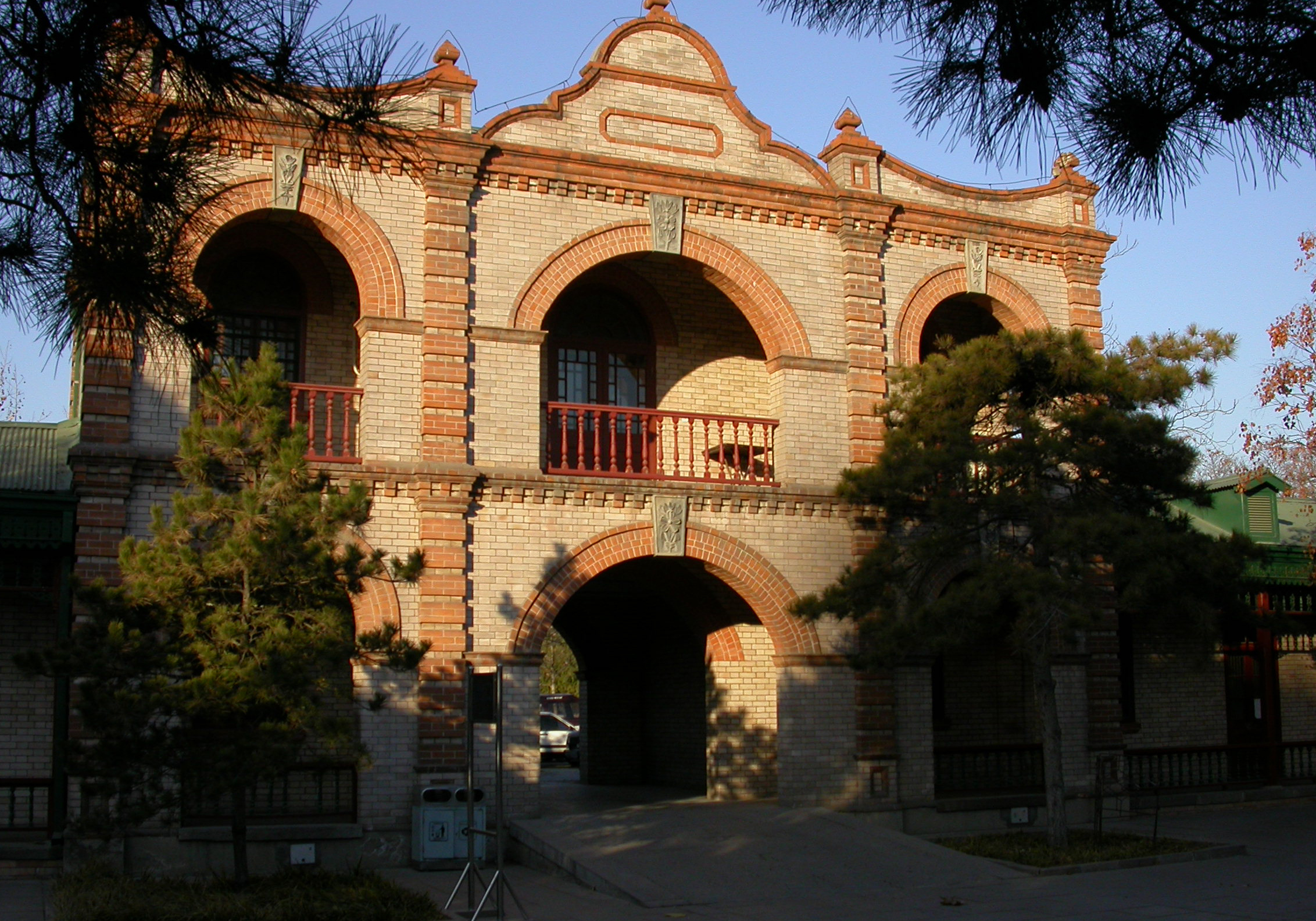
Office House, formerly the Office House of Imperial Agriculture Examination Field

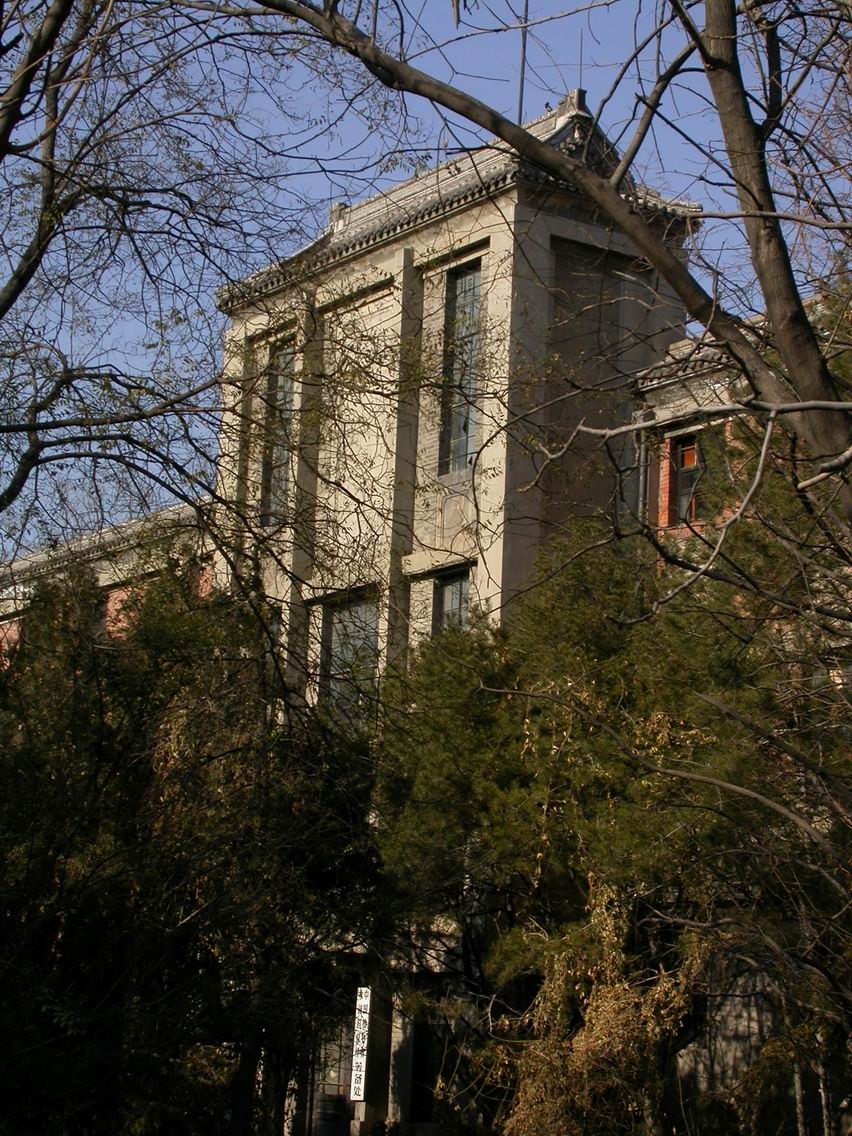
Lamarck Hall

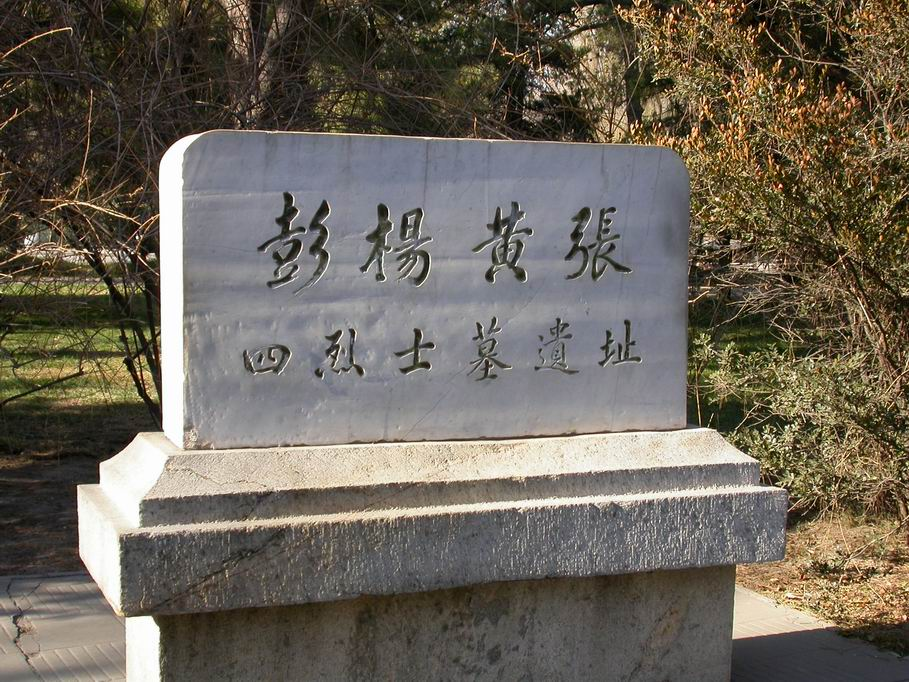
Tomb of Four Martyrs
"Venues"
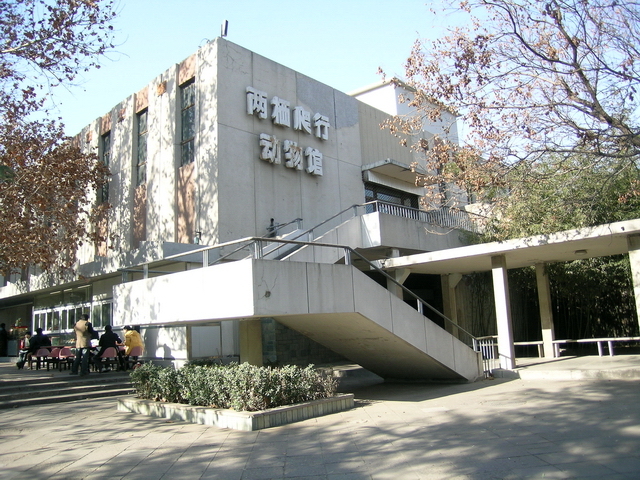
Amphibian and Reptile House

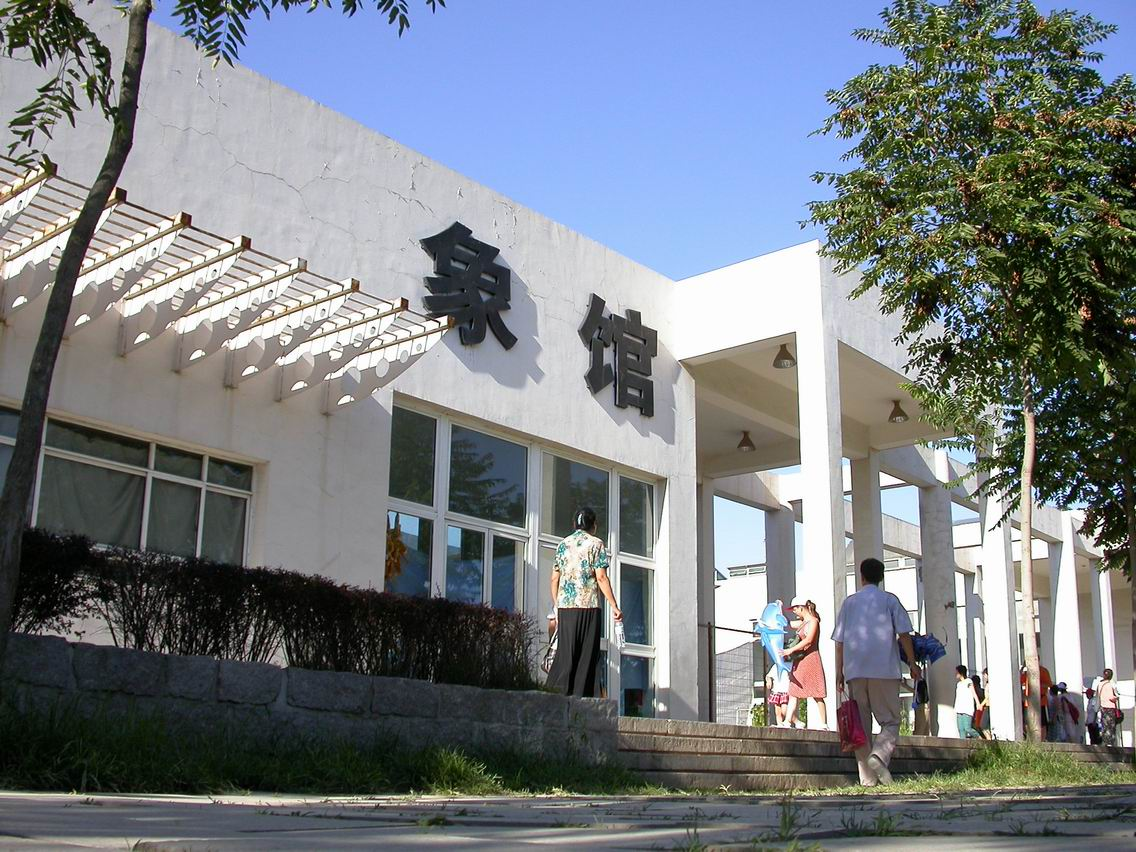
Elephant House

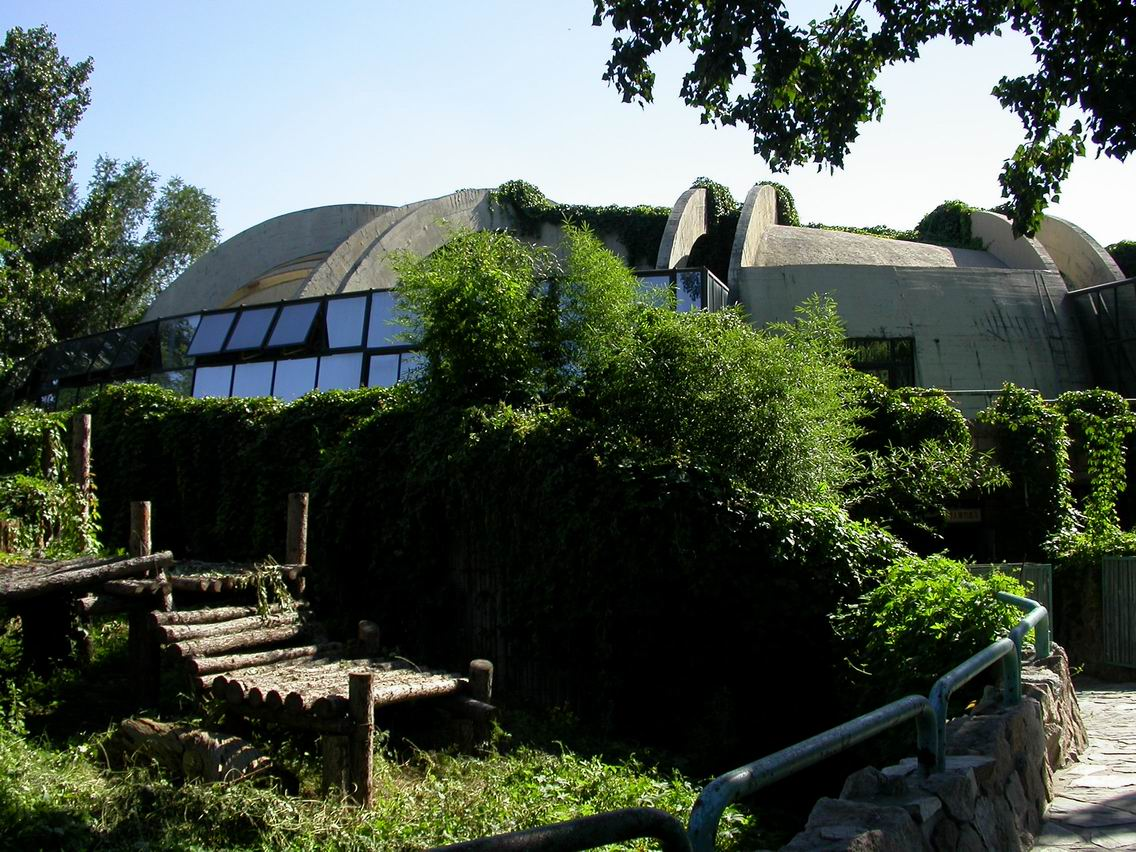
Panda House

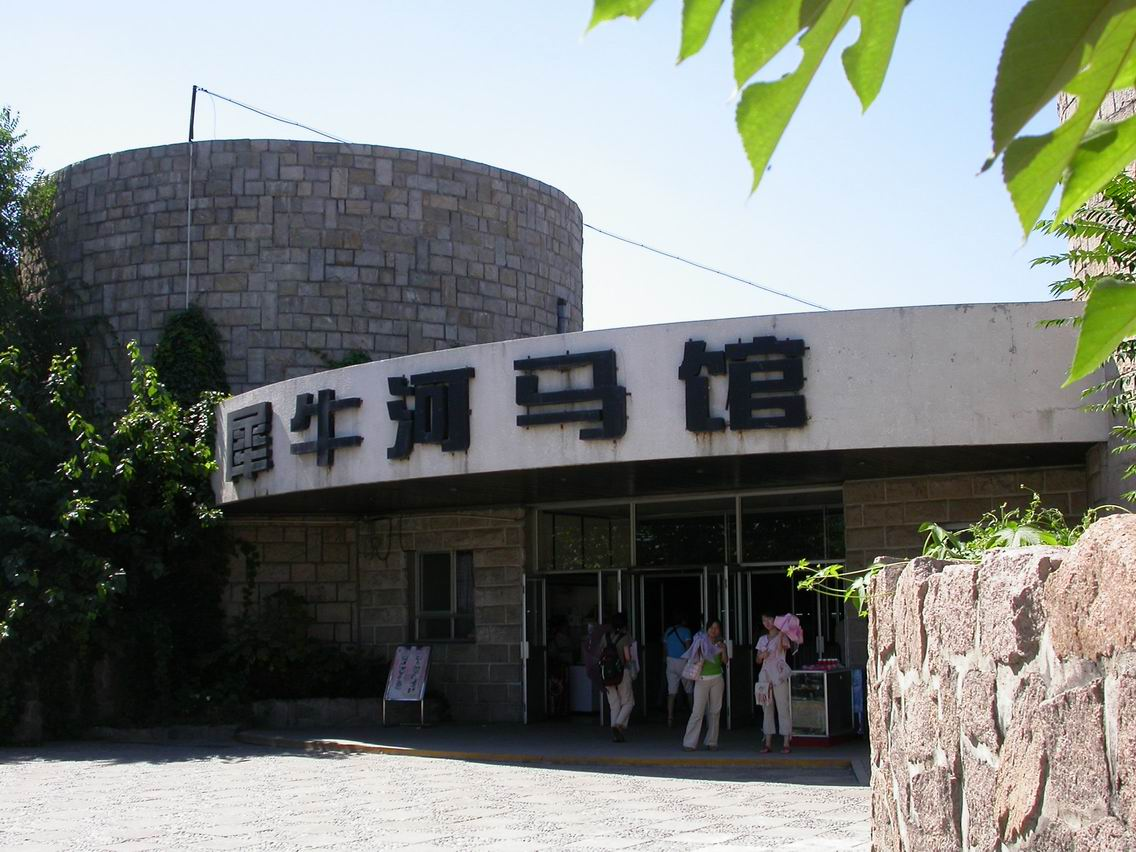
Rhinoceros and Hippo House

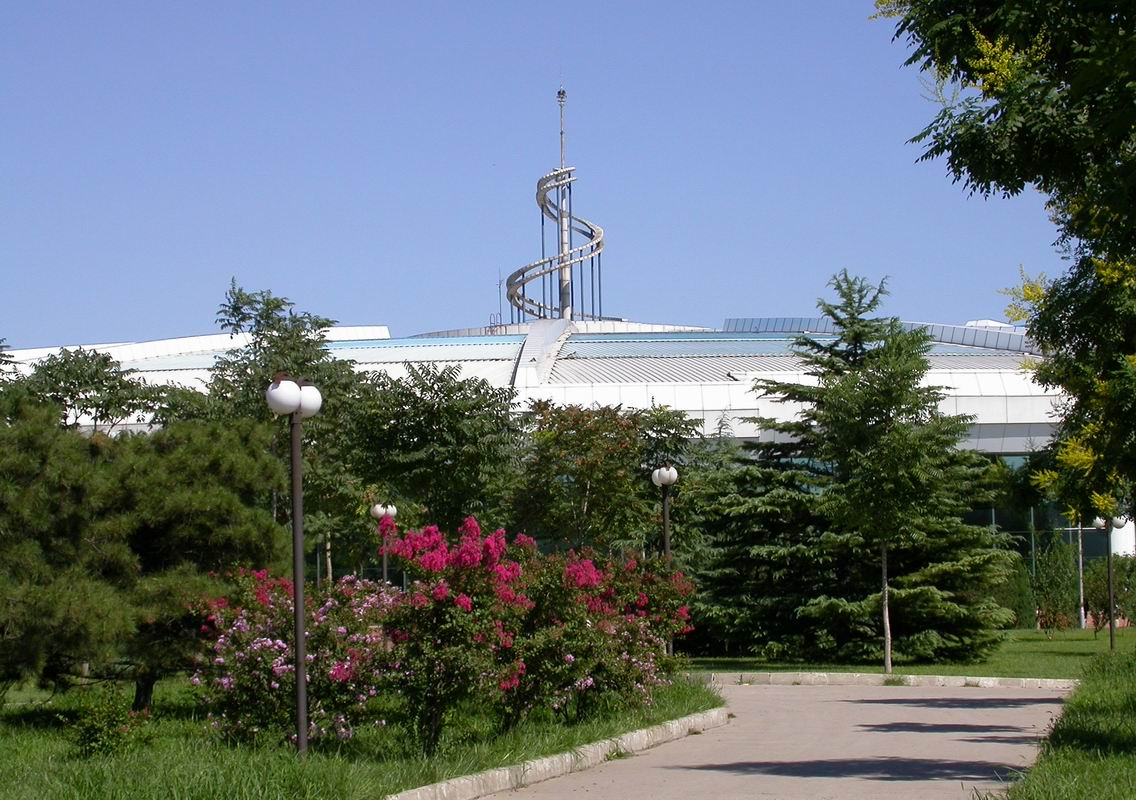
Beijing Aquarium

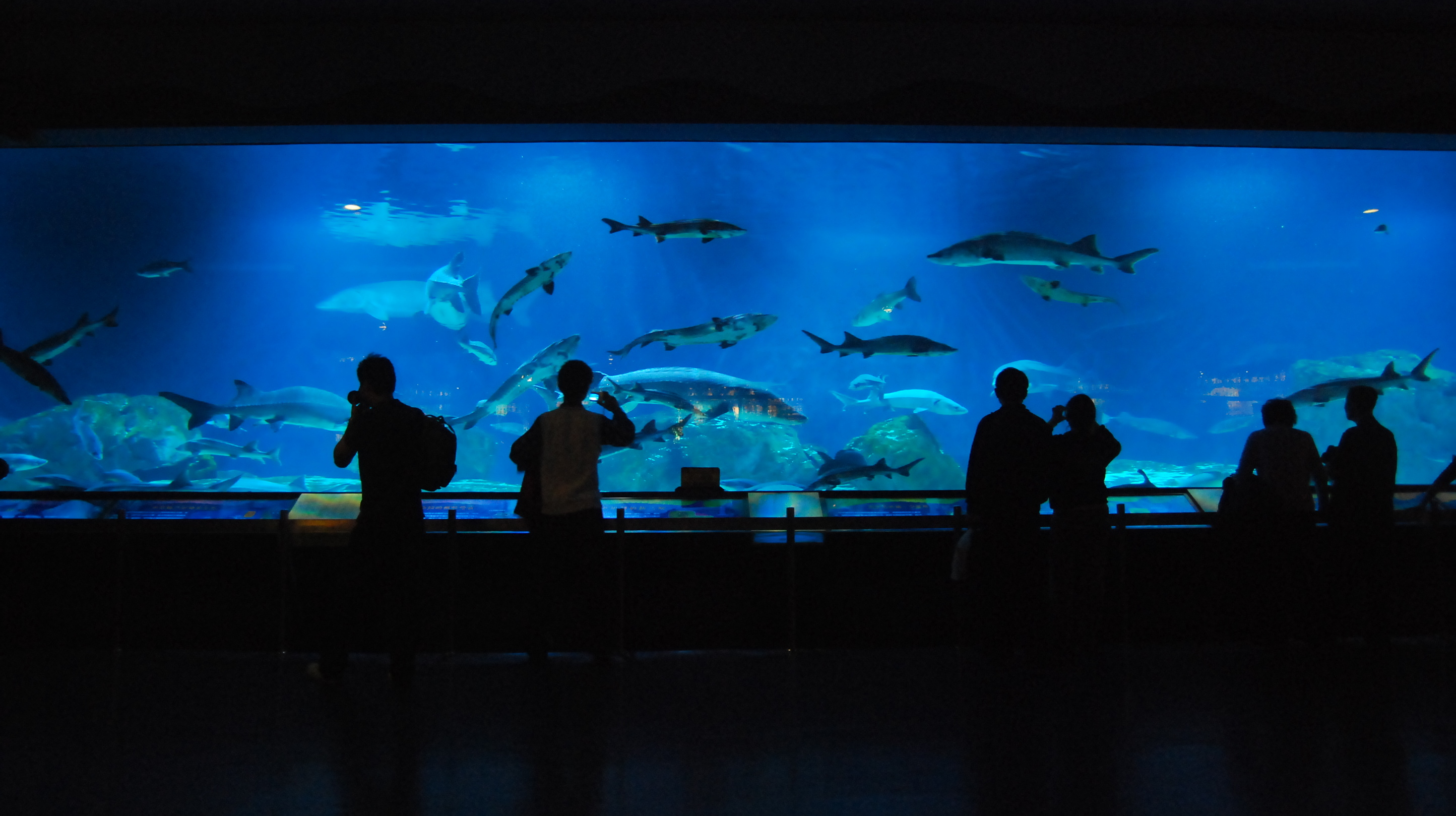
Aquarium interior

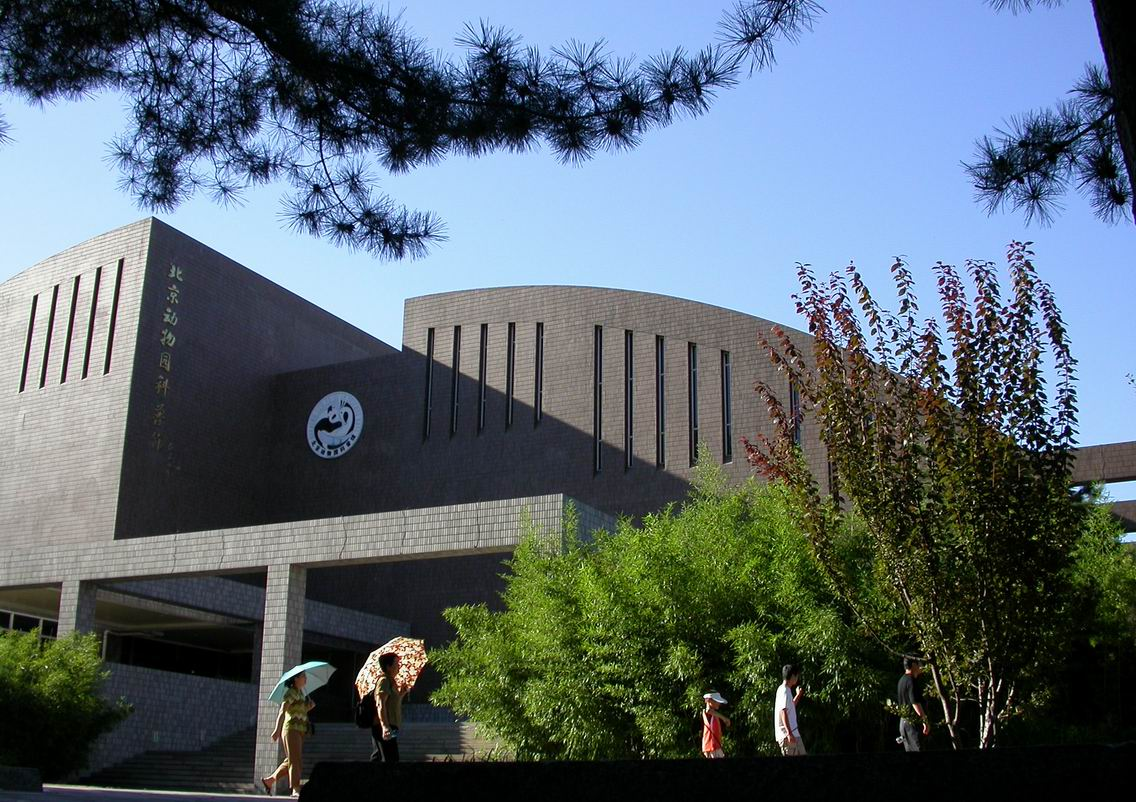
Zoology Museum

== Beijing Aquarium ==
The Beijing Aquarium is located within the zoological park, on the northern bank of the Chang River. Opened in 1999, the aquarium complex covers an area of 120,000 square meters, with 42,000 square meters of interior space. It is the biggest aquarium in China with a large number of fish species and marine mammals. Visitors can watch shows performed by dolphins, belugas, and sea lions.

== Animals ==
The Beijing Zoo is well known for its collection of rare animals endemic to China, including giant pandas, red pandas, golden snub-nosed monkeys, South China tigers, white-lipped deer, Père David's deer, crested ibises, Chinese alligators and Chinese giant salamanders.

Panda Complex

- Giant panda

Small-sized Mammals

- Masked palm civet
- Meerkat
- Raccoon
- Red panda
- South American coati

Canidae

- Corsac fox
- Mongolian wolf
- Raccoon dog
- Red fox
- Spotted hyena
- Striped hyena

Monkey Hill

- Rhesus macaque

Bear Hill

- Asian black bear
- Brown bear
- Polar bear

Felidae

- Caracal
- Eurasian lynx
- Serval

Lion and Tiger

- African lion
- Siberian tiger
- White tiger

Waterfowl lake

- Bar-headed goose
- Black swan
- Black-necked crane
- Common crane
- Great white pelican
- Grey crowned crane
- Mallard
- Mandarin duck
- Northern pintail
- Ruddy shelduck
- Swan goose
- White-naped crane
- Whooper swan

Tapir House

- Baird's tapir
- Malayan tapir

American Animals Zone

- Alpaca
- Giant anteater
- Greater rhea
- Green iguana
- Linnaeus's two-toed sloth
- Lowland paca

Australian Animals Zone

- Emu
- Galah
- Red kangaroo
- Red-necked wallaby
- Southern cassowary

Pheasant Garden

- Blue eared pheasant
- Brown eared pheasant
- Budgerigar
- Cockatiel
- Green peafowl
- Indian peafowl
- Lady Amherst's pheasant
- Reeves's pheasant
- Silver pheasant
- Swinhoe's pheasant
- Temminck's tragopan

Flamingo House

- American flamingo
- Chilean flamingo
- Greater flamingo
- Marabou stork
- Oriental stork
- Yellow-billed stork

Bird Garden

- Blue-and-yellow macaw
- Coconut lorikeet
- Eclectus parrot
- Eurasian spoonbill
- Great hornbill
- Grey parrot
- Hyacinth macaw
- Java sparrow
- Orange-winged amazon
- Pink cockatoo
- Red-and-green macaw
- Scarlet ibis
- Silvery-cheeked hornbill
- Wreathed hornbill
- Yellow-crowned amazon

Elephants

- African bush elephant
- Asian elephant

Rhinos & Hippos

- Hippopotamus
- Southern white rhinoceros

Eagle Hill

- Golden eagle
- White-tailed eagle

African Animals Zone

- Gemsbok
- Giraffe
- Plains zebra

Deer Garden

- Addax
- Argali
- Bactrian camel
- Black muntjac
- Blesbok
- Chinese goral
- Golden takin
- Kiang
- Mongolian wild ass
- Père David's deer
- Przewalski's horse
- Reeves's muntjac
- Scimitar oryx
- Siberian ibex
- Siberian roe deer
- Sichuan takin
- Wapiti
- White-lipped deer

Reptile and Amphibian House

- Beauty rat snake
- Burmese python
- Chinese alligator
- Chinese crocodile lizard
- Chinese giant salamander
- Chinese pond turtle
- Red-footed tortoise
- Siamese crocodile
- Spectacled caiman

Apes & Monkeys

- Celebes crested macaque
- Chimpanzee
- De Brazza's monkey
- Mandrill

Tropical monkeys house

- Black-and-white ruffed lemur
- Common squirrel monkey
- Tufted capuchin

Gibbon House

- Eastern hoolock gibbon
- Northern white-cheeked gibbon
- Yellow-cheeked gibbon

Golden Monkeys

- Black-and-white snub-nosed monkey
- Golden snub-nosed monkey
- Gray snub-nosed monkey

Otters

- Asian small-clawed otter

Penguin House

- Humboldt penguin

== Location and access ==
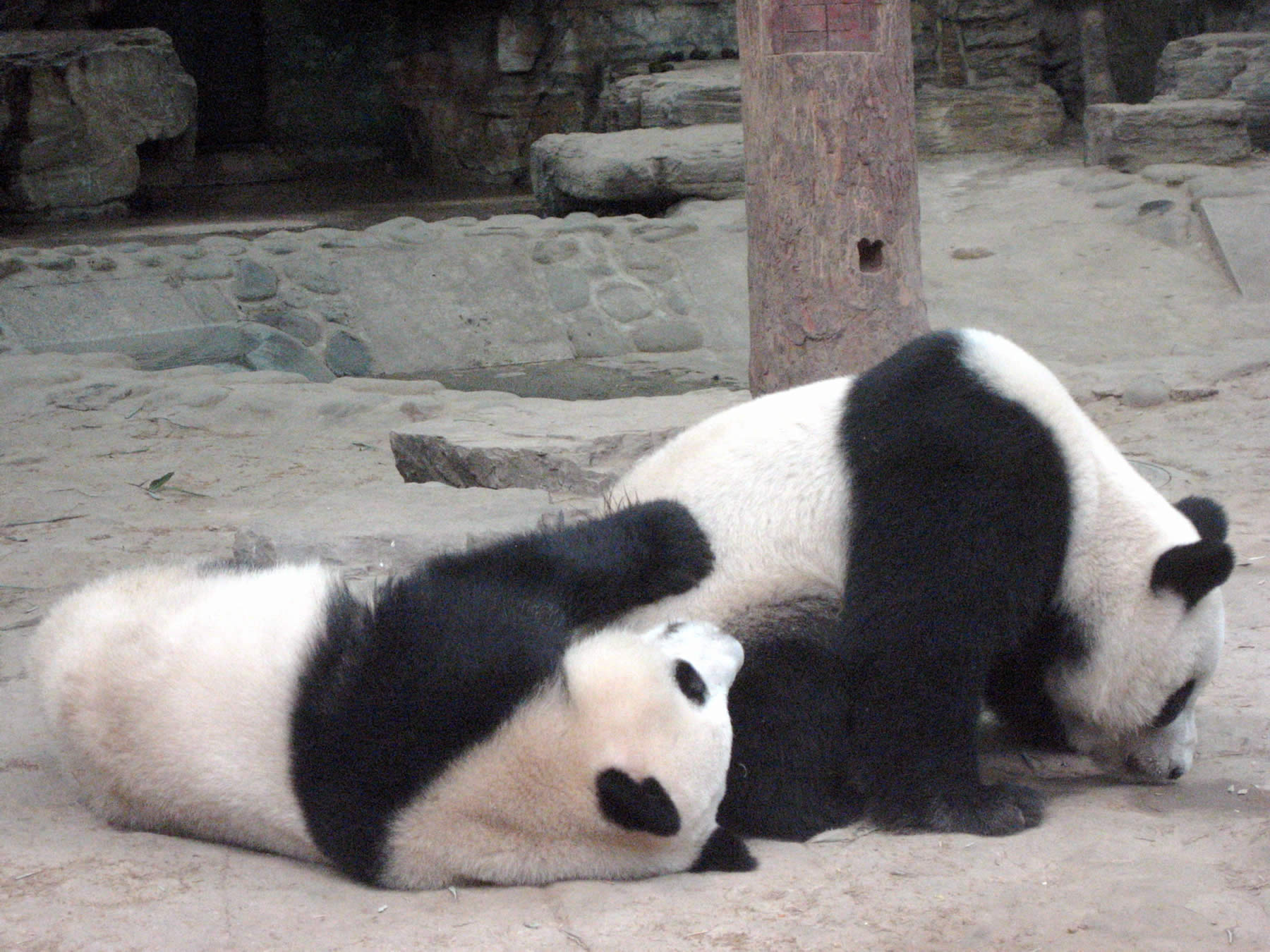
Giant Pandas in the Beijing Zoo

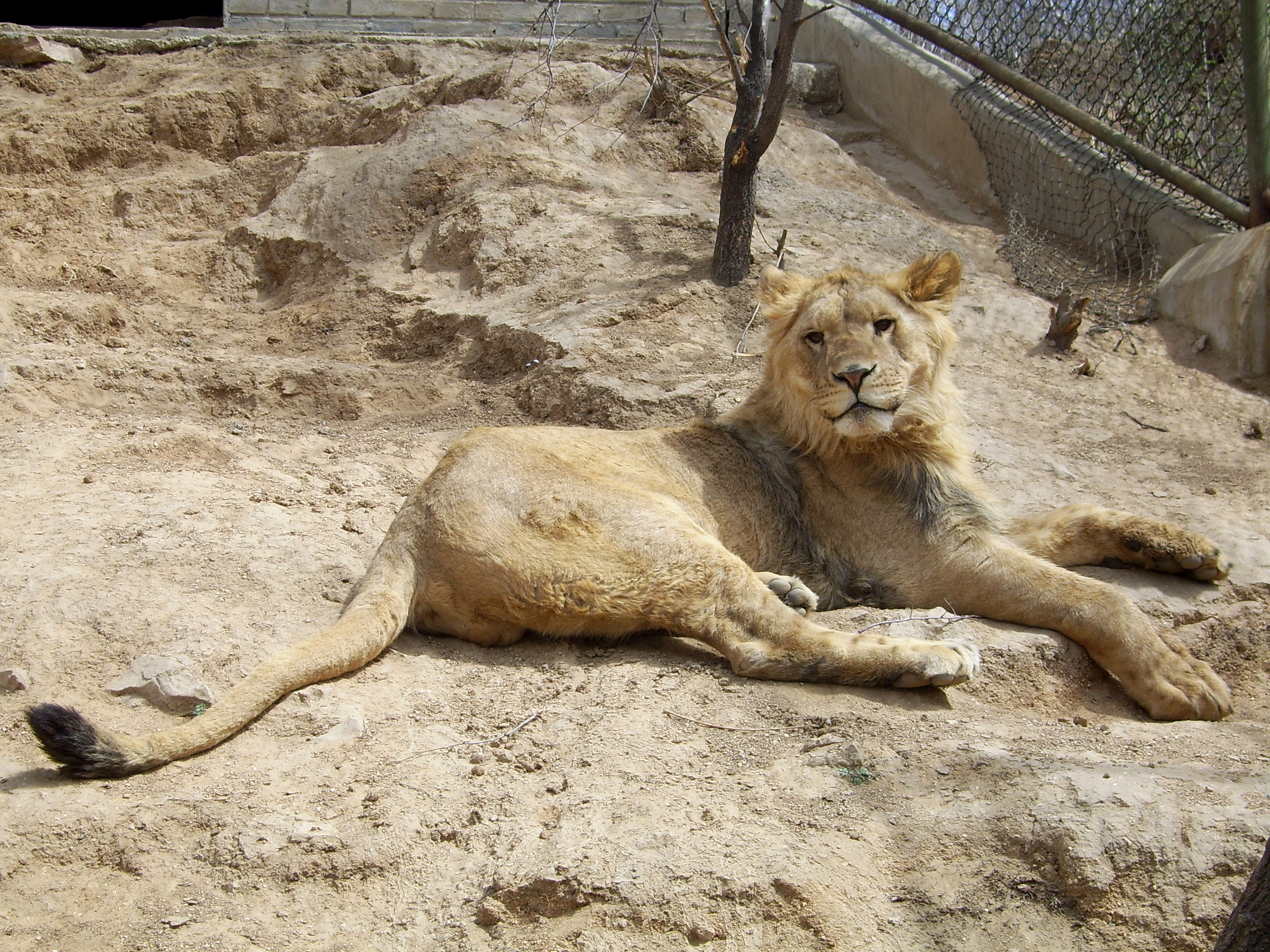
Lion in the Beijing Zoo

The Beijing Zoo is located at 137 Xizhimen Wai Dajie in Xicheng District, just west of the northwest corner of the 2nd Ring Road. Outside the zoo is a local public transit hub with Beijing Zoo Station on Line 4 of the Beijing Subway and terminals for Beijing Bus routes 7, 15, 19, 102, and 103. Bus routes 27, 105, 107, 111, 305, 347, 360, 362, 534, 563, 604, 632, 686, 特4, 特19, 夜8 also stop at the zoo.

=== Nearby attractions ===
The Beijing Planetarium is located diagonally across the street from the zoo's main entrance. To the west of the zoo is the Purple Bamboo Park. To the east is the Beijing Exhibition Center and the Moscow Restaurant.

== Controversies ==
According to a 2010 article in The Guardian, a restaurant located at the zoo, named "Bin Feng Tan," offers various dishes of exotic animals on its menu. The restaurant manager commented that its dishes were within the law, as the animal products were supplied by exotic animal farms. However, the restaurant received a backlash since the news spread. Ge Rui of the International Fund for Animal Welfare describes the restaurant's menu and practices as "utterly inappropriate for a zoo" and "socially irresponsible." Following the negative coverage, the restaurant stated they would be revising the menu.

== In popular culture ==
A significant portion of James Rollins' Sigma Force novel, The Bone Labyrinth (2015), takes place in, near, and below Beijing Zoo. Rollins depicts unsanitary and inhumane conditions at the zoo, and inhumane animal experimentation there. In the "Author's Note to Readers: Truth or Fiction", Rollins writes: "I did visit the Beijing Zoo and found the state of that zoological park to be appalling. The government continues to hint at changes and plans to move the place into a larger zoo outside the city with more modern accommodations. So hopefully now that I've blown it up, they'll get on with those plans."

Fish and Elephant, directed by documentary filmmaker and former TV hostess Li Yu, is based within the zoo. The film is often referred to as the first mainland Chinese film to broach the topic of lesbian relationships in China.
