= Caihuying =

Caihuying may refer to:

- Caihuying (Area), in Fengtai District, Beijing, China
- Caihuying station, station on Line 14, Beijing Subway
- Caihuying Bridge, an overpass in Caihuying Area, Fengtai District, Beijing, China
