= Dongwuyuan (Beijing Zoo) station =

Beijing Subway station

Coordinates: 39°56′18″N 116°20′21″E

Dongwuyuan (Beijing Zoo) 动物园
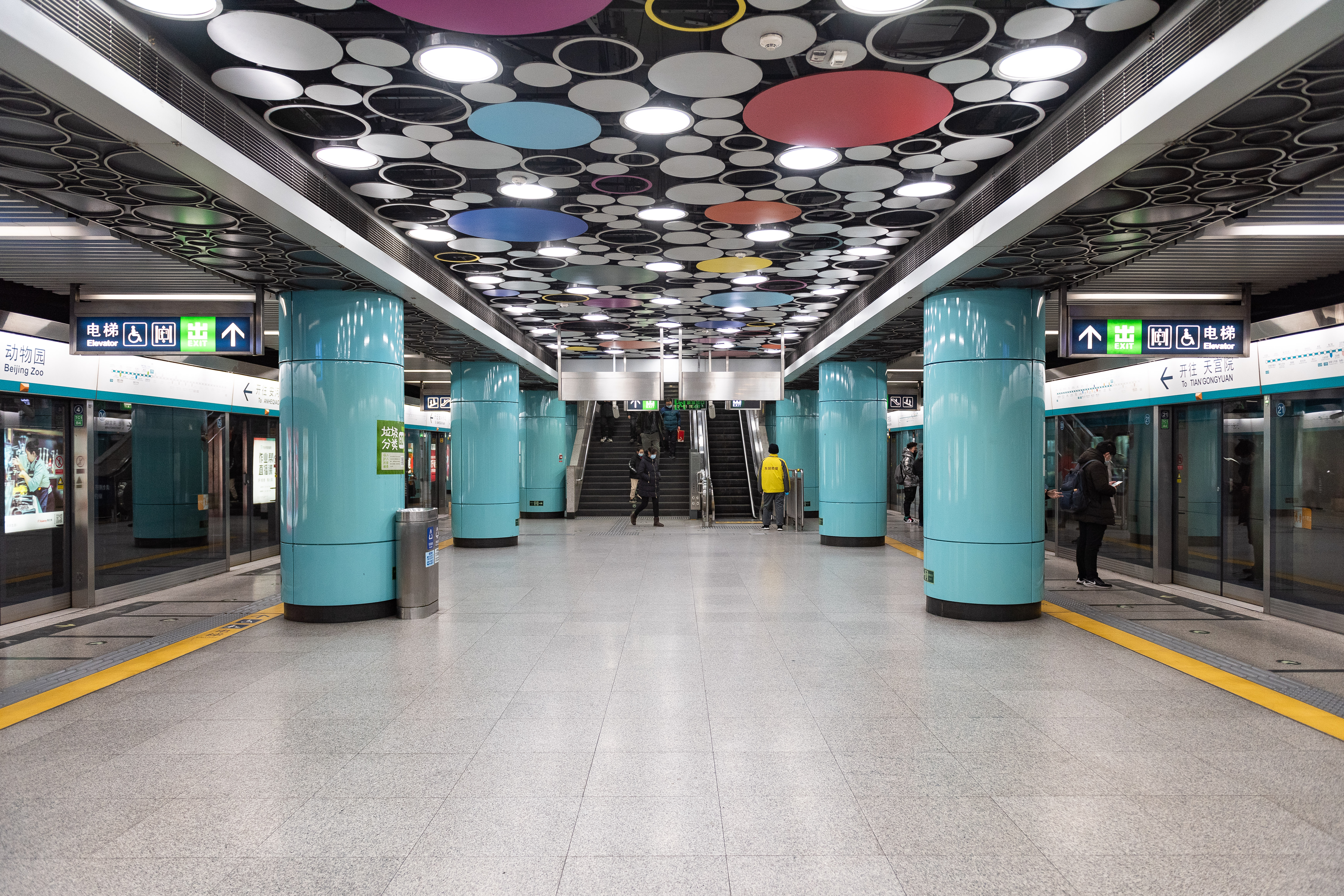
- Platform

General information
- Location: Xizhimen Outer Street; Xicheng District, Beijing; China
- Operator: Beijing MTR Corporation Limited
- Line: Line 4
- Platforms: 2 (1 island platform)
- Tracks: 2

Construction
- Structure type: Underground
- Accessible: Yes

History
- Opened: September 28, 2009

Services
Preceding station	Beijing Subway	Following station
National Library towards Anheqiaobei	Line 4	Xizhimen towards Tiangong Yuan
Location
- Location within Beijing

Dongwuyuan (Beijing Zoo) Station (simplified Chinese: 动物园站; traditional Chinese: 動物園站; pinyin: Dòngwùyuán Zhàn) is a station on the Line 4, of the Beijing Subway, located at the Beijing Zoo in Xicheng District, Beijing. The station opened on September 28, 2009, with the initial phase of Line 4.

The station on average has 100,000 entrances and exits per day.

== Station layout ==
The station has an underground island platform.

== Exits ==
There are 5 exits, lettered A, B, C, D and E. Exit A is accessible. Exit C provides access to the Beijing Zoo Public Transit Hub, and Exit D provides access to the Beijing Planetarium. A new canopy for Exit A was completed on June 1, 2019, to handle increased traffic during peak hours.

== Gallery ==
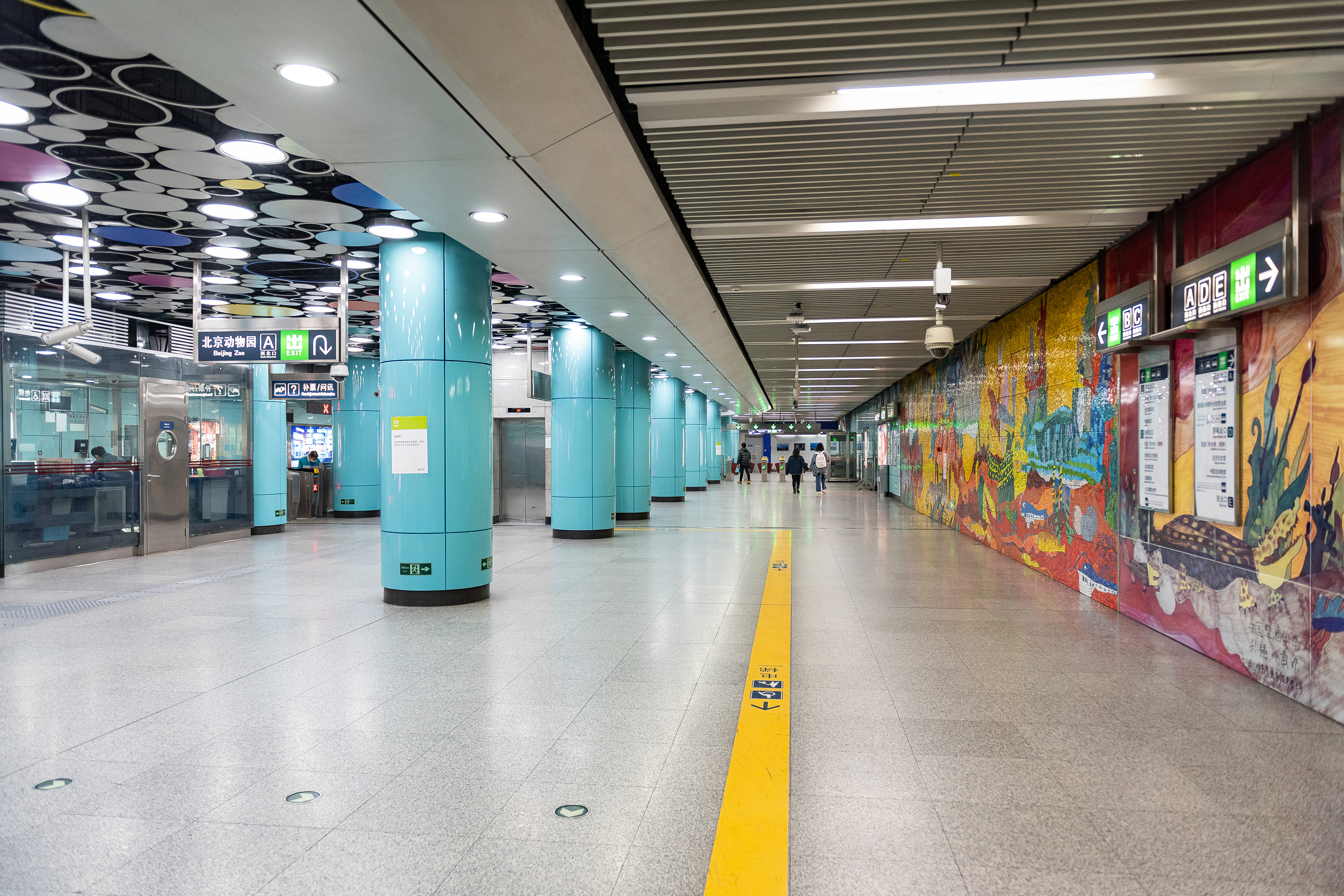
Concourse

== See also ==
- Beijing Zoo
- Beijing Planetarium
