= Fuxingmen =

Former gate in Beijing, China

Coordinates: 39°54′20.93″N 116°21′1.24″E

Fuxingmen (simplified Chinese: 复兴门; traditional Chinese: 復興門; pinyin: Fùxīngmén) is the name of a gate that used to be a part of Beijing's old city wall. It is also the name of a road situated in central Beijing and on the northwestern stretch of the 2nd Ring Road in Beijing's Xicheng District.

== Origin ==
Fuxingmen means "Gate of Revival". An overpass over the ring road exists with the same name.

Beijing subway lines 1 and 2 have an interchange stop at Fuxingmen Station. Several public buses serve the area as well.

The commercial centres of Xidan and Beijing Financial Street are not far away. Fuxingmen also marks the western end of Fuxingmen Inner Street, which is a western extension of West Chang'an Avenue, and the eastern starting point of Fuxingmen Outer Street.

== Streets ==
- Fuxingmen Inner Street
- Fuxingmen Outer Street
- Fuxingmen South Street, part of 2nd Ring Road (Beijing)
- Fuxingmen North Street, part of 2nd Ring Road (Beijing)
