= 2nd Ring Road =

Innermost circular highway around central Beijing, China

Coordinates: 39°53′53″N 116°23′12″E

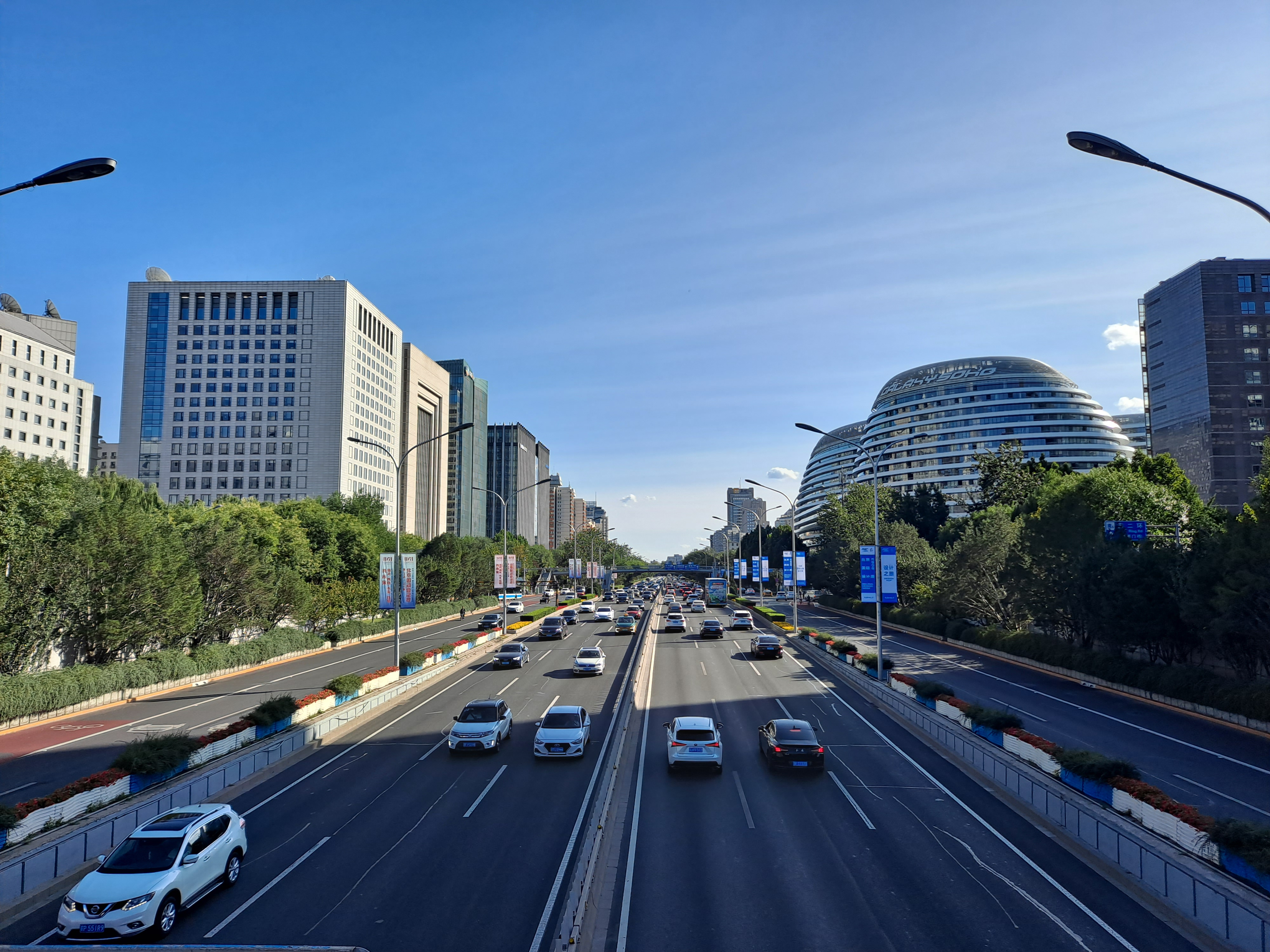
2nd Ring Road in 2023

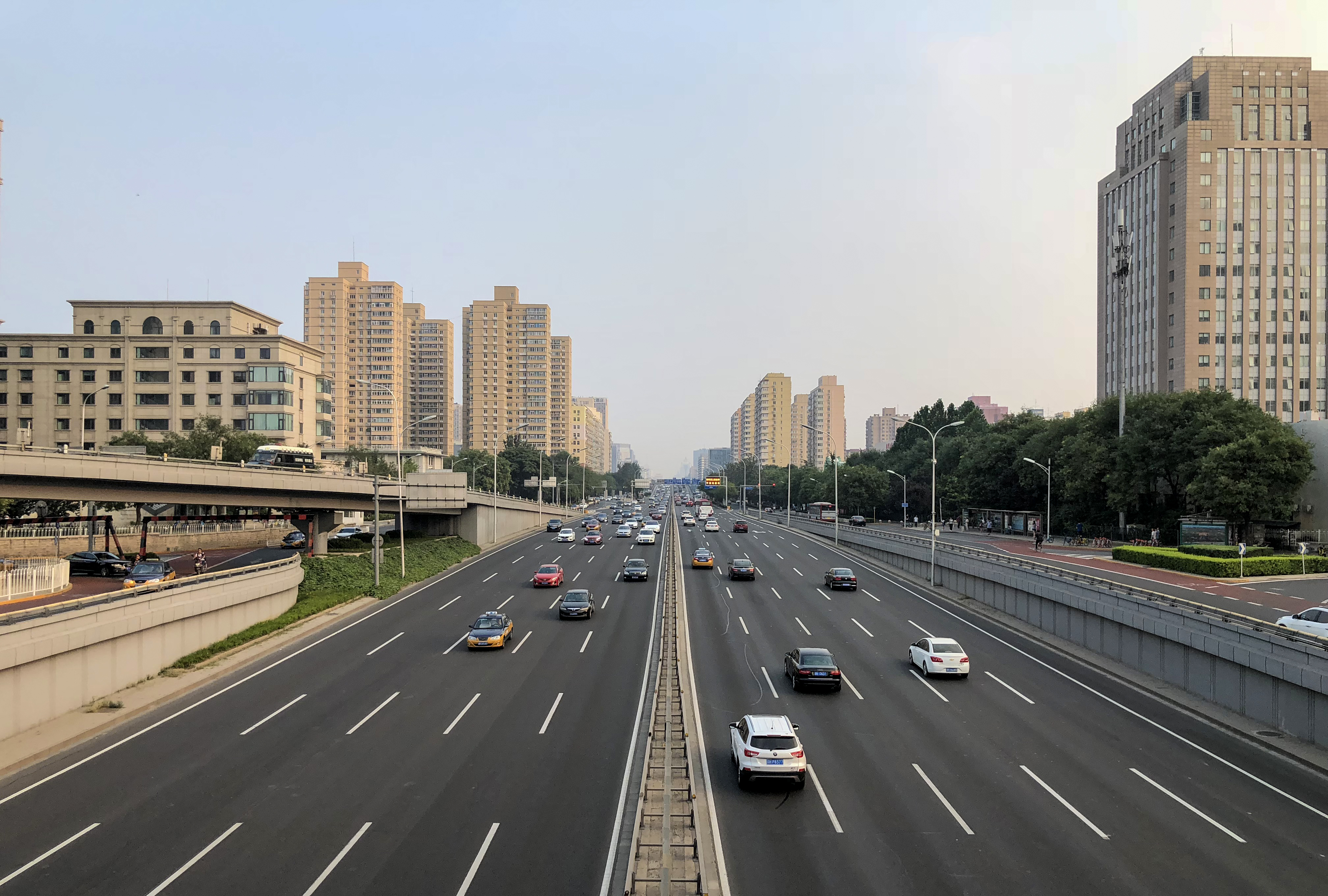
2nd Ring Road in Xicheng District

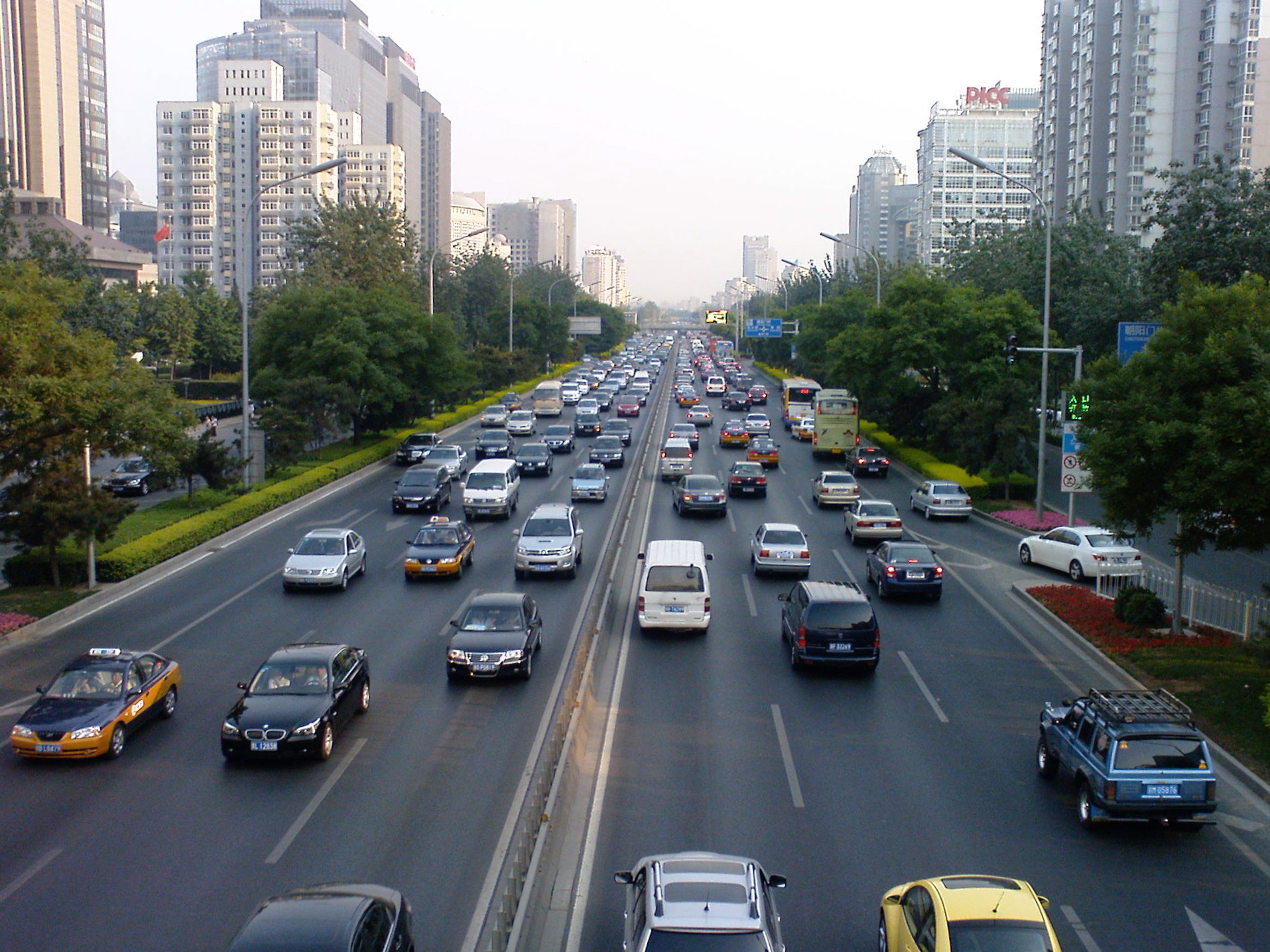
Eastern segment in 2009

The 2nd Ring Road (Chinese: 二环路; pinyin: èr huán lù) is the innermost ring road highway which encircles the city center of Beijing, People's Republic of China. (The first ring road had been a circular tram route.)

The ring road can be divided into two parts: the original ring road (the southern section of which is now excluded from the current ring road), and the newly extended ring road. This article only covers the current (new) 2nd Ring Road.

== History and geography ==
Beijing City Walls

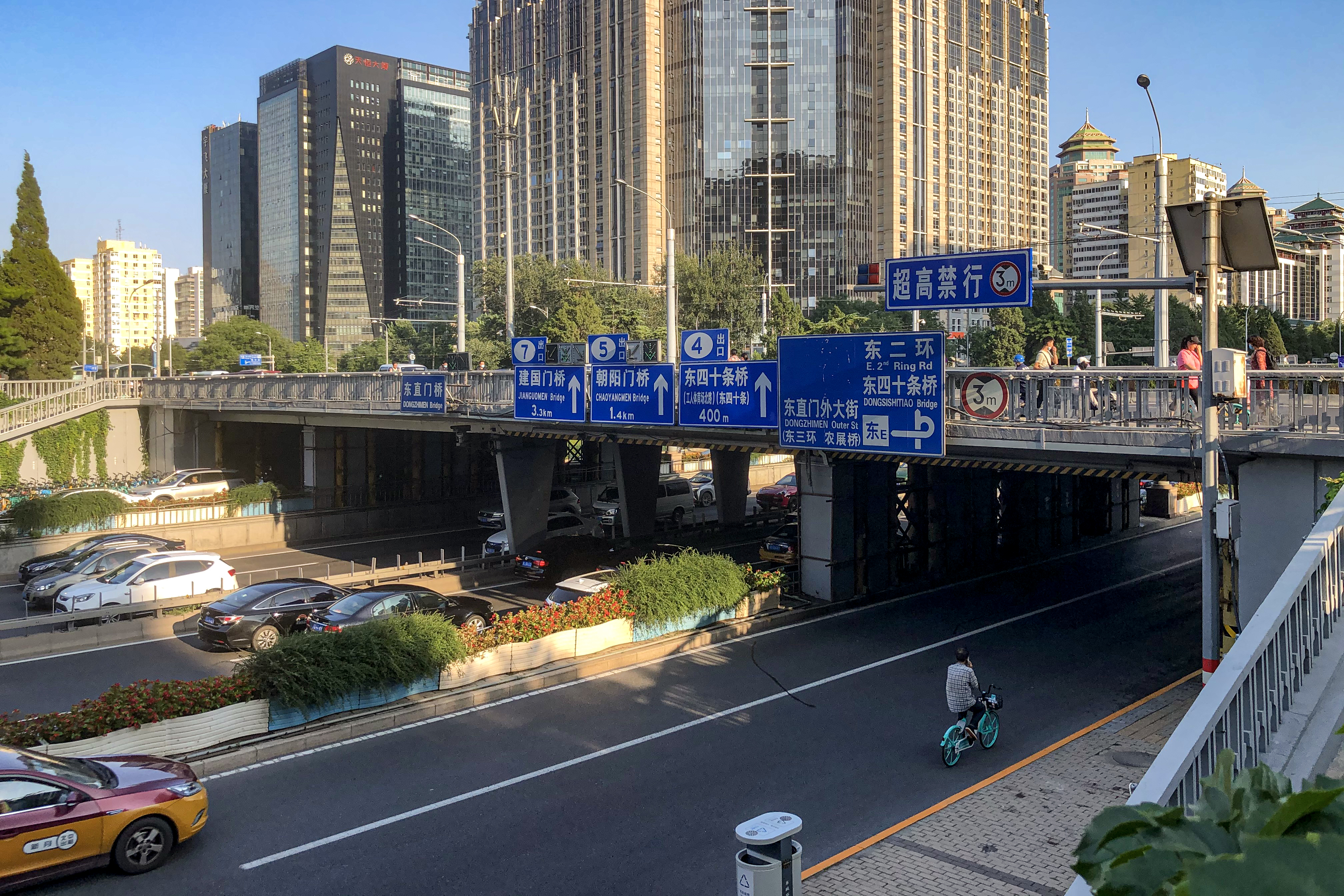
Dongzhimen Bridge on the 2nd Ring Road in 2020

The 2nd Ring Road runs close to where Beijing's city walls once stood; numerous junctions bear the old city gate's name. A small number of these city gates themselves still stand: Southeast corner tower, Deshengmen and Yongdingmen (which has been rebuilt). Most of the old city walls were pulled down shortly after the People's Republic of China was established in 1949.

Although it was suggested that the 2nd Ring Road was built over the old city walls, by comparing current city maps with old maps of Beijing, it has been found this is not exactly true. The road instead mostly follows the former moat that surrounded the city wall; in places, the moat survives as a canal. The 2nd ring road was completed in the 1980s.

All traffic lights were removed in the 1990s, and several new overpasses were built.

In 2001, the 2nd Ring Road was overhauled. It was fully re-surfaced, and greenery substantially increased.

Much of Line 2 of the Beijing Subway runs underneath the Second Ring Road. Many stations have exits on both sides of the road, with the exception of Andingmen.

=== The Old 2nd Ring Road ===
The former "old 2nd Ring Road" has an elliptical shape. Its northwest corner is at Xizhimen, the northeast corner is at Dongzhimen, and southern corners are at Dongbianmen and Xibianmen. The southern side is the so-called "Subway Road" (named after the Southern section of Subway Line 2) which goes through Zhengyangmen (Qianmen), at the southern end of Tian'anmen Square.

=== The New 2nd Ring Road ===
The new road is simply an extension of the western and eastern parts of the original 2nd Ring Road. It extends beyond Dongbianmen and Xibianmen, thus reaching Zuo'anmen to the southeast and the Caihuying overpass complex in the southwest. The extensions were known for a while as the external 2nd Ring Road, though this term is becoming more and more unpopular.

=== Gates and the 2nd Ring Road ===
The 2nd Ring Road passes the sites of many of the old city gates around Beijing. These include:

- Deshengmen
- Andingmen
- Dongzhimen
- Chaoyangmen
- Guangqumen
- Zuo'anmen
- Yongdingmen
- You'anmen
- Guang'anmen
- Fuchengmen
- Xizhimen

Only Deshengmen and Yongdingmen (rebuilt 2005) still stand; the others were demolished in the 1950s and 1960s.

Gates through which the former Inner 2nd Ring Road (so-called "Subway Road", named after the Southern section of Subway Line 2) passes are:

- Chongwenmen
- Zhengyangmen (Qianmen)
- Xuanwumen

Only Zhengyangmen (Qianmen) is still standing today.

== Road conditions ==
=== Surface conditions ===
After completion in the 1980s, the design of the 2nd Ring Road was sufficient for its traffic load. However, as utilization increased in the late 20th century, the road surface rapidly deteriorated. Prior to 2001, the road gave motorists an uncomfortable bumpy ride. Since the total resurfacing, driving on the road has been much more pleasant. Partial resurfacing work is ongoing.

=== Central location ===
Located in the heart of the city, the 2nd Ring Road is also a transportation bottleneck. Traffic jams are common, and it is hard to find immediate alternative routes as the 2nd Ring has few direct links to expressways. For cars and larger vehicles, there is no way to cross the 2nd Ring Road except at full junctions, or by making a U-turn under an overpass; pedestrians, cycles and motorcycles can make use of pedestrian overpasses. The speed limit is 80 km/h except for sharply turning sections such as between Xiaojie Bridge and Dongzhimen. Speed checks are very frequent and cameras are often operating, some of the locations of these are known, while some are hidden beneath bridges or behind screens.

=== Traffic jams ===
Traffic jams on the 2nd Ring Road have become a part of daily life. Nevertheless, their intensity varies.

The northern stretch between Andingmen and Xiaojie Bridge is often jammed, particularly in the lead to the turn-off for the Airport Expressway. The same goes for part of the road around Deshengmen and all of the western side. The entire eastern side is frequently jammed due to its proximity to the Beijing CBD.

Less frequently jammed traffic can be found on the southern stretch of the 2nd Ring Road from Caihuying Bridge through Zuo'anmen Bridge.

While the 2nd Ring Road is often congested, unlike the 3rd Ring Road, it is never gridlocked. The 3rd Ring Road uses diamond interchanges, which includes traffic lights. These interchanges back up traffic and causes gridlock. The 2nd Ring Road instead employs mostly cloverleaf interchanges, which allows traffic to flow freely and without traffic lights, therefore eliminating traffic back up.

=== Road condition monitors ===
Electronic message signs (or screens) are placed throughout the 2nd Ring Road, displaying information about current traffic. The information is only given in simplified Chinese characters at present.

The western part of the 2nd Ring Road has "smart" electronic screens, automatically updated every five minutes. Traffic conditions are continuously monitored. Maps are also shown on them to notify drivers of road conditions at various parts of the road, including Jishuitan, Xizhimen, and Fuxingmen on the Chang'an Avenue.

Although only Chinese characters are used, the characters themselves are coloured red, yellow or green according to the type of message. This and the map displays make it somewhat easier for non-Chinese speakers to understand.

== Links to expressways ==
The Badaling Expressway is linked to (from the side road) at Deshengmen. A direct ramp connection from both directions to the Airport Expressway was finished in 2006. The Jingkai Expressway is easily accessible by proceeding south to the complex-and-impressive Caihuying Bridge. There are no direct connections from the 2nd Ring Road to the Jingshen Expressway, Jingjintang Expressway, or Jingcheng Expressway.

It is possible to get to the Jingshi Expressway by heading southwest at Guang'anmen. Jianguomen links via Jianguomen Outer Street to the Jingtong Expressway and ultimately the Jingha Expressway.

== List of exits ==
[Heading in a clockwise direction as of the Northern 2nd Ring Road]

Notes:

- Exits present only in a clockwise direction are indicated by the symbol ↩; anticlockwise only, ↪; not yet open, ✕
- Exit sign symbols: ↗ = exit (✕ = unopened)

=== North 2nd Ring Road ===
- ↗ Beitaipingzhuang, Xinjiekou (Jishuitan Bridge)
- ↗ Madian -- connects to direct road to Badaling Expressway (Deshengmen Bridge)
- ↗ Anhua Bridge (Gulou Bridge, Zhonglou North Bridge)
- ↗ Jiangzhaikou (Andingmen Bridge)
- ↗ Yonghegong, Beixinqiao (Yonghegong Bridge)
- ↗ Hepingli (Xiaojie Bridge)
- ↗ Airport Expressway

=== East 2nd Ring Road ===
- ↗ Nongzhan Bridge, Beixinqiao (Dongzhimen Bridge)
- ↗ Changhong Bridge, Kuanjie (Dongsishitiao Bridge)
- ↗ Dongdaqiao (Chaoyangmen Bridge)
- ↗ Dongdan, Guomao Bridge (Jianguomen Bridge)
- ↗ (Dongbianmen Bridge)
- ↗ (Guangqumen Bridge)
- ↗ Temple of Heaven (Guangming Bridge)

=== South 2nd Ring Road ===
- ↗ (Zuo'anmen Bridge)
- ↗ Chongwenmen (Puhuangyu / Yuting Bridge)
- ↗ (Jingtai Bridge)
- ↗ (Yongdingmen Bridge)
- ↗ (Taoran Bridge)
- ↗ (Kaiyang Bridge)
- ↗ (You'anmen Bridge)
- ↗ Jingkai Expressway, Lize Bridge, Caihuying Bridge

=== West 2nd Ring Road ===
- ↗ (Baizhifang Bridge)
- ↗ (Guang'anmen Bridge)
- ↗ ([Tianningsi Bridge, Xibianmen Bridge)
- ↗ (Fuxingmen Bridge)
- ↗ (Yuetan South Bridge, Yuetan North Bridge)
- ↗ (Fuchengmen Bridge)
- ↗ (Guanyuan Bridge)
- ↗ (Xizhimen Bridge)
