= Deshengmen =

City gate in Beijing, China

Coordinates: 39°56′54.8″N 116°22′23.0″E

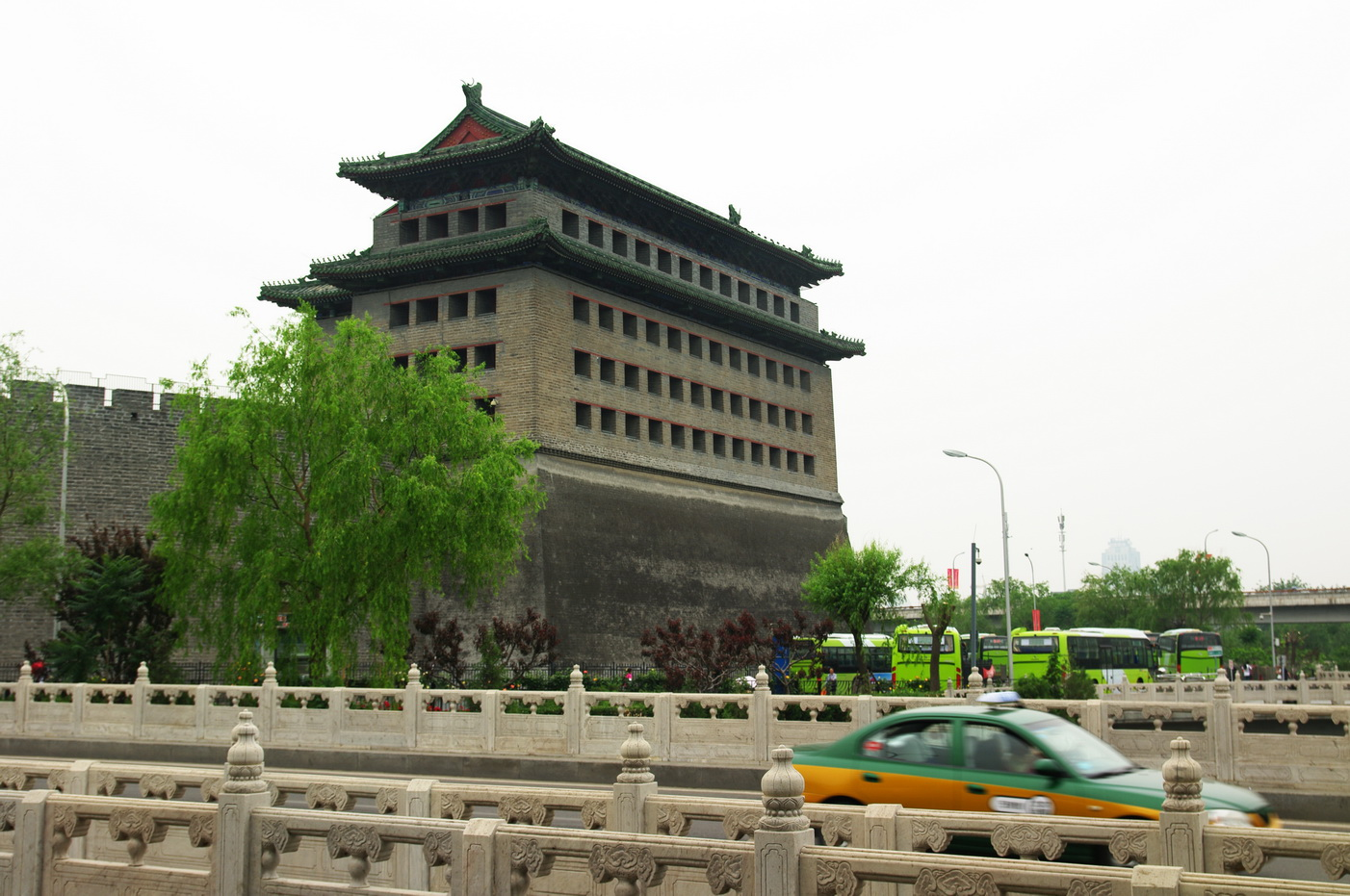
The Deshengmen archery tower

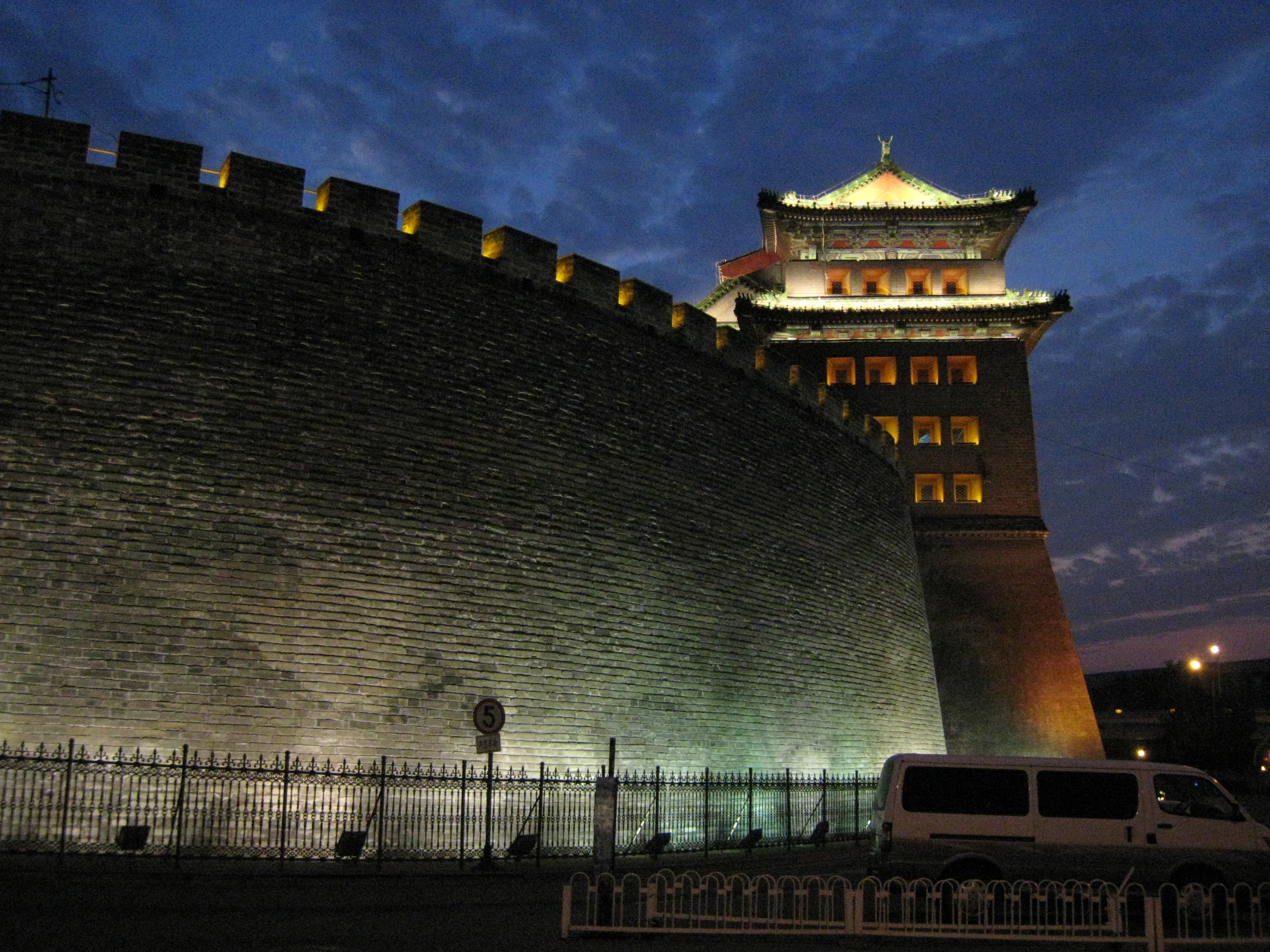
Deshengmen at night with the barbican in the foreground

Deshengmen (simplified Chinese: 德胜门; traditional Chinese: 德勝門; pinyin: Déshèngmén; lit. 'Gate of Virtuous Triumph') is a city gate that was once part of Beijing's northern city wall. It is one of Beijing's few preserved city gates and now stands as a landmark on the northern 2nd Ring Road.

The original gate complex, built in 1437, was composed of three structures – the gatehouse, archery tower, and barbican. The gatehouse proper was demolished in 1921, and the city wall was torn down in 1969. Today, only the archery tower and the barbican survives. They overlook the northern city moat, and house an ancient coin exhibition inside.

Deshengmen is now a major transportation node in northern Beijing. The gate complex is surrounded by the Deshengmen bridge, a rotary overpass that channels traffic from the 2nd Ring Road to the Badaling Expressway. The street that once passed through the gate is still named in relation to it. South of Deshengmen and inside the old city wall is Deshengmen Inner Street. To the north, it is called Deshengmen Outer Street.

Deshengmen means "Gate of Virtuous Triumph." In traditional times, the imperial military would march out of Beijing through Deshengmen, and return through Andingmen, the Gate of Peace and Stability.

== Public transportation ==
Line 2 of the Beijing Subway stops near Deshengmen at Jishuitan Station. Deshengmen is the terminus for many Beijing Bus routes, as well as a tourist bus that goes to Badaling Great Wall.
