= Xizhimen =

Former gate in the Beijing city wall

Coordinates: 39.9405°N 116.3554°E

- Simplified Chinese: 西直门
- Traditional Chinese: 西直門
Transcriptions
Standard Mandarin
- Hanyu Pinyin: Xīzhímén
- Wade–Giles: Hsi-chih-men

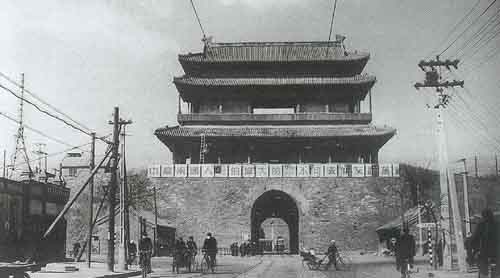
The old Xizhimen gate

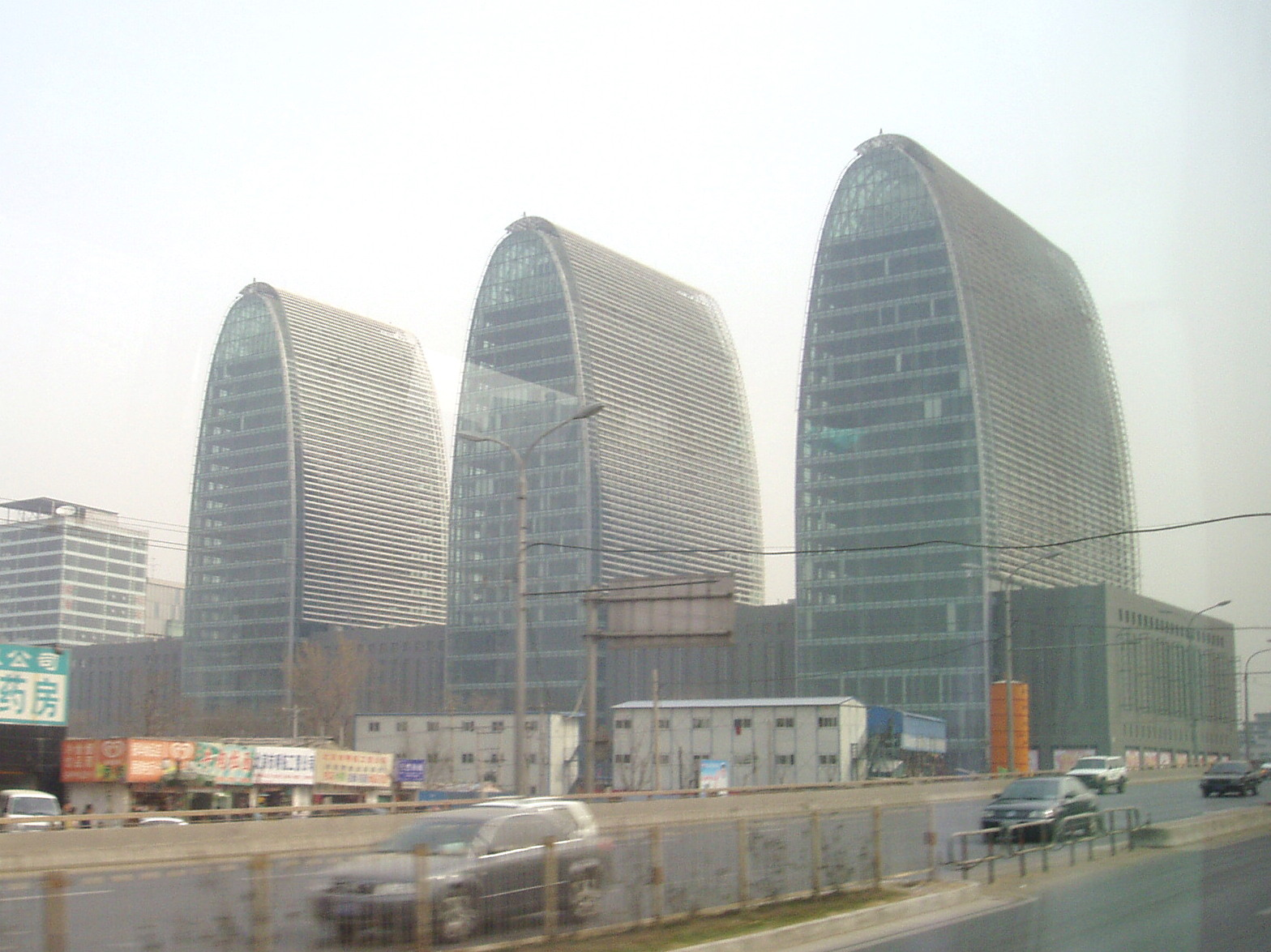
Office Building over Xizhimen Subway Connection

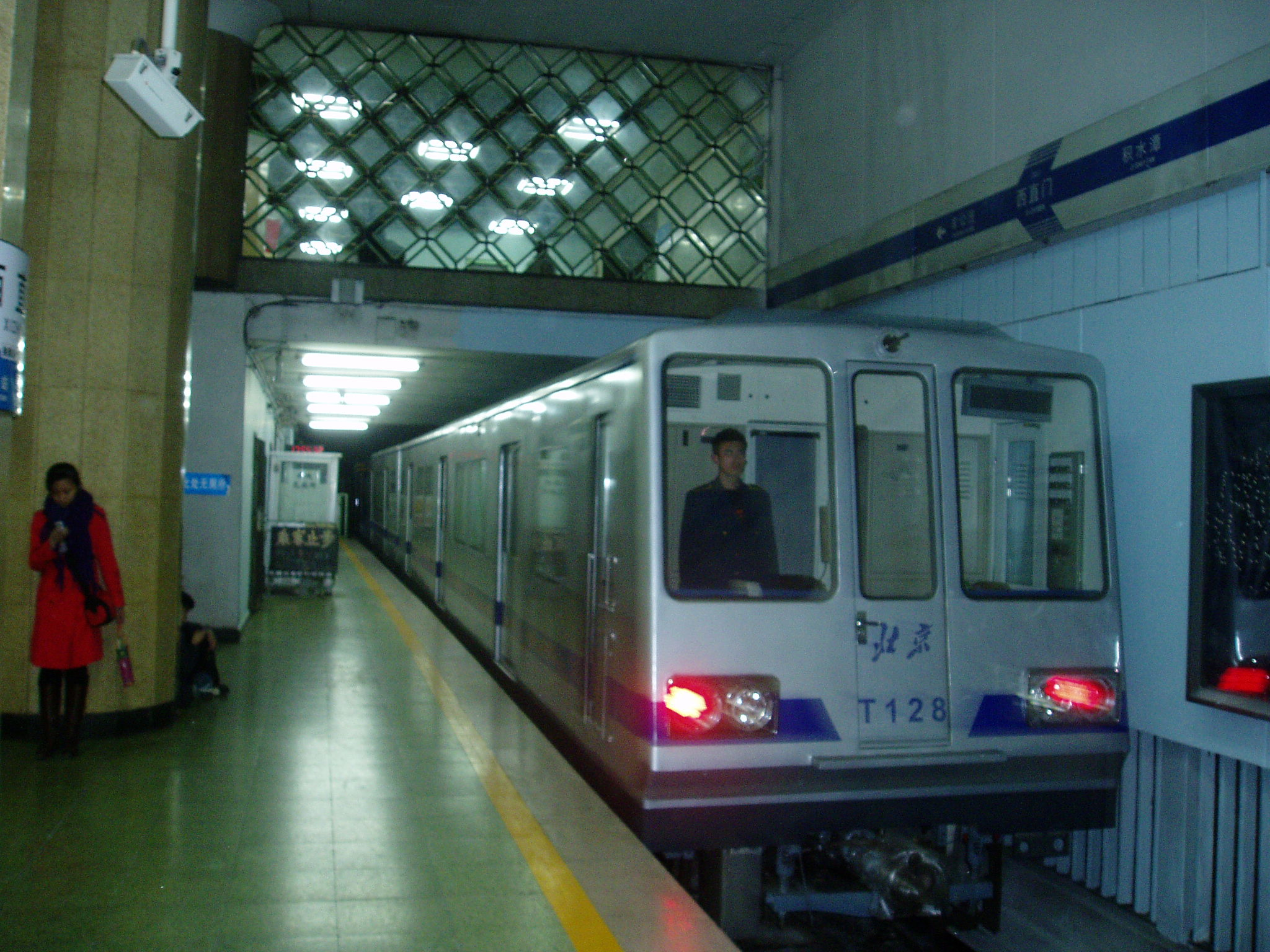
Subway #2 at Xizhimen

Xizhimen (Chinese: 西直门; pinyin: Xīzhímén) was a gate in the Beijing city wall and is now a transportation node in Beijing. The gate was the entrance of drinking water for the Emperor, coming from the Jade Spring Hills to the west of Beijing. The gate was demolished in 1969.

== Transportation ==
The 2nd Ring Road links with Xizhimen Outer Street, which has recently been transformed into a city express road, linking the western 2nd Ring Road via Beijing Zoo to the 3rd Ring Road. A triple-arched highrise building is a noticeable landmark at the intersection.

The Beijing North railway station is in the Xizhimen area.

Line 2, Line 4 and Line 13 of the Beijing Subway network all stop at Xizhimen Station. A transfer passage with escalators allows for direct transfers between the three Lines. Line 13 has its western terminus at Xizhimen.

Xizhimen is served by many Beijing public buses. Bus routes 16, 360, 362, 275, 438, 534, 563, 632, 651, 特15, and 夜21 all have terminals in the Xizhemen area.

A bridge is named after the region (Xizhimen Bridge). The bridge has a northern connection bridge built in the late 1970s. It will be removed and be replaced soon. The main Xizhimen Bridge, built also in the 1970s, once stood a rather frightening 5.5 m (it was then, and still is now, for the record, the tallest bridge on the 2nd Ring Road) and had three layers, with the top layer acting as a roundabout. Demolition of the old central bridge took place in 1999 by means of structural removal instead of a major bridge explosion. It was replaced with a series of new bridges which bear no resemblance to the old bridge.

== Xihuan Plaza and Xizhimen Project ==
In 2008 due to the Olympic Games, a reform in Xizhimen Transportation hub, was finished, a masterplan willing to integrate the new Xizhimen, Offices and Commercial building, with the Xihuan Plaza, and both train and subway station. Several Chinese and International Companies took part on the design and construction of the plan. In Xihuan Plaza & Xizhimen Transportation Hub, Li Xinggang, as the chief designer, presided the engineering design and particular work. The constructions were inaugurated just in time for the Olympic Games.
