= Caihuying Bridge =

Overpass in Fengtai District, Beijing

Caihuying Bridge (simplified Chinese: 菜户营桥; traditional Chinese: 菜戶營橋; pinyin: Càihùyíng Qiáo) is an overpass in Fengtai District, southwestern urban Beijing. It links the 2nd Ring Road, which does a turn from south to east, with a connection road to the Jingkai Expressway and another route to the western 3rd Ring Road. It is one of the few overpasses in Beijing to connect more than two roads.

Caihuying Bridge is the southwestern edge of the 2nd Ring Road.
