= Beixinqiao Subdistrict =

Beixinqiao Subdistrict 北新桥街道
- Subdistrict
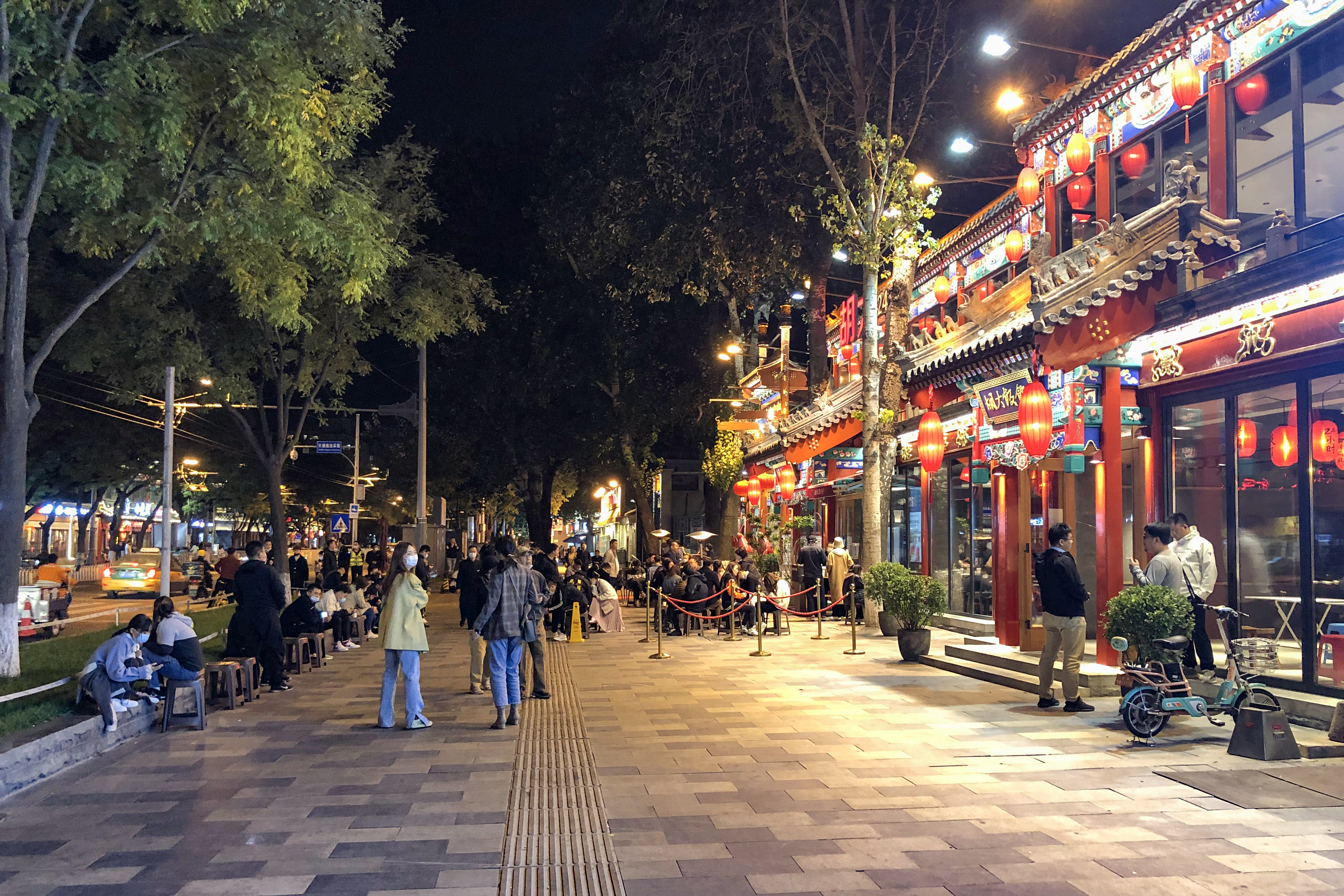
- Dongzhimen Inner Street, also known as Guijie (簋街)

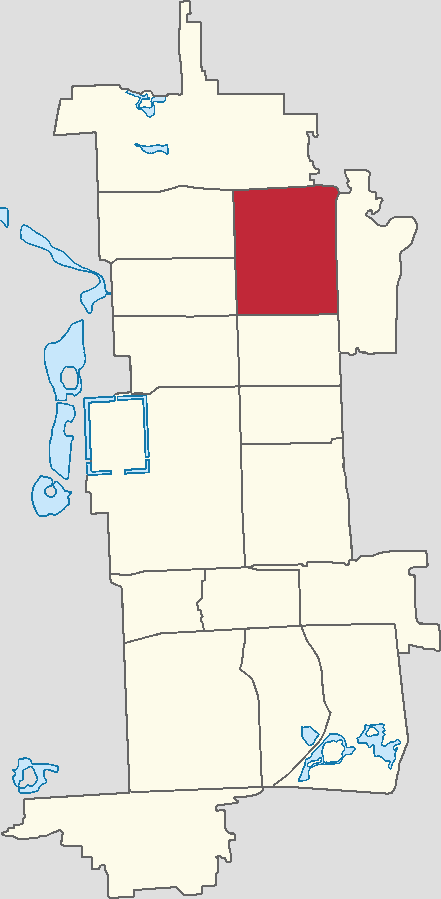
- Location of Beixinqiao Subdistrict within Dongcheng District

- Location within Beijing Location within China
- Coordinates: 39.9392°N 116.4276°E
- Country: China
- Municipality: Beijing
- District: Dongcheng
- Village-level Division: 10 communities

Area
  - Total: 2.67 km^{2} (1.03 sq mi)

Population (2020)
  - Total: 55,449
  - Density: 20,800/km^{2} (53,800/sq mi)
- Time zone: UTC+8 (China Standard)
- Postal code: 100007

Beixinqiao Subdistrict (Chinese: 北新桥街道; pinyin: běixīnqiáo jiēdào) is a subdistrict in the northern part of Dongcheng District, Beijing, China. The Yonghe Temple is located here. The subdistrict consists of 10 communities. By 2020 it has a total population of 55,449. Beijing Subway Line 5 runs through the subdistrict; stops include Beixinqiao station.

This area of land was called "Xingqiao" (Chinese: 兴桥; lit. 'Prosperous Bridge') During the Yuan dynasty, and was changed to "Beixinqiao" (Chinese: 北新桥; lit. 'New Northern Bridge') in the Qing dynasty. There was a legend about Chinese monk Yao Guangxiao having locked up a Dragon King inside a well.

== History ==
Timeline of changes in the status of Beixinqiao
Year	Change
1912	Part of the 3rd Inner District
1949	Part of Dongcheng District. Following subdistricts were established: Menlou Hutong; Shique Hutong; Dongsongnian Hutong; Dongzhimennei Hutong; Guanyinsi Hutong; Yangguan Hutong
1955	Reduced to 4 subdistricts: Guanyinsi, Wacha, Yangguan and Dongsong.
1958	4 subdistricts were combined to form the Beixinqiao Subdistrict.

== Administrative Division ==
As of 2021, there are a total of 10 communities in the subdistrict:

Administrative Division Code	Community Name (English)	Community Name (Simplified Chinese)
110101005001	Haiyuncang	海运仓
110101005002	Beixincang	北新仓
110101005004	Menlou	门楼
110101005006	Min'an	民安
110101005008	Jiudaowan	九道湾
110101005009	Beiguanting	北官厅
110101005010	Qinglong	青龙
110101005011	Xiaoju	小菊
110101005014	Caoyuan	草园
110101005016	Qianyongkang	前永康

== Famous Sites ==
- Yonghe Temple
- Bailin Temple
- Tongjiao Temple
