= Anding Men station =

Beijing Subway station

Anding Men 安定门
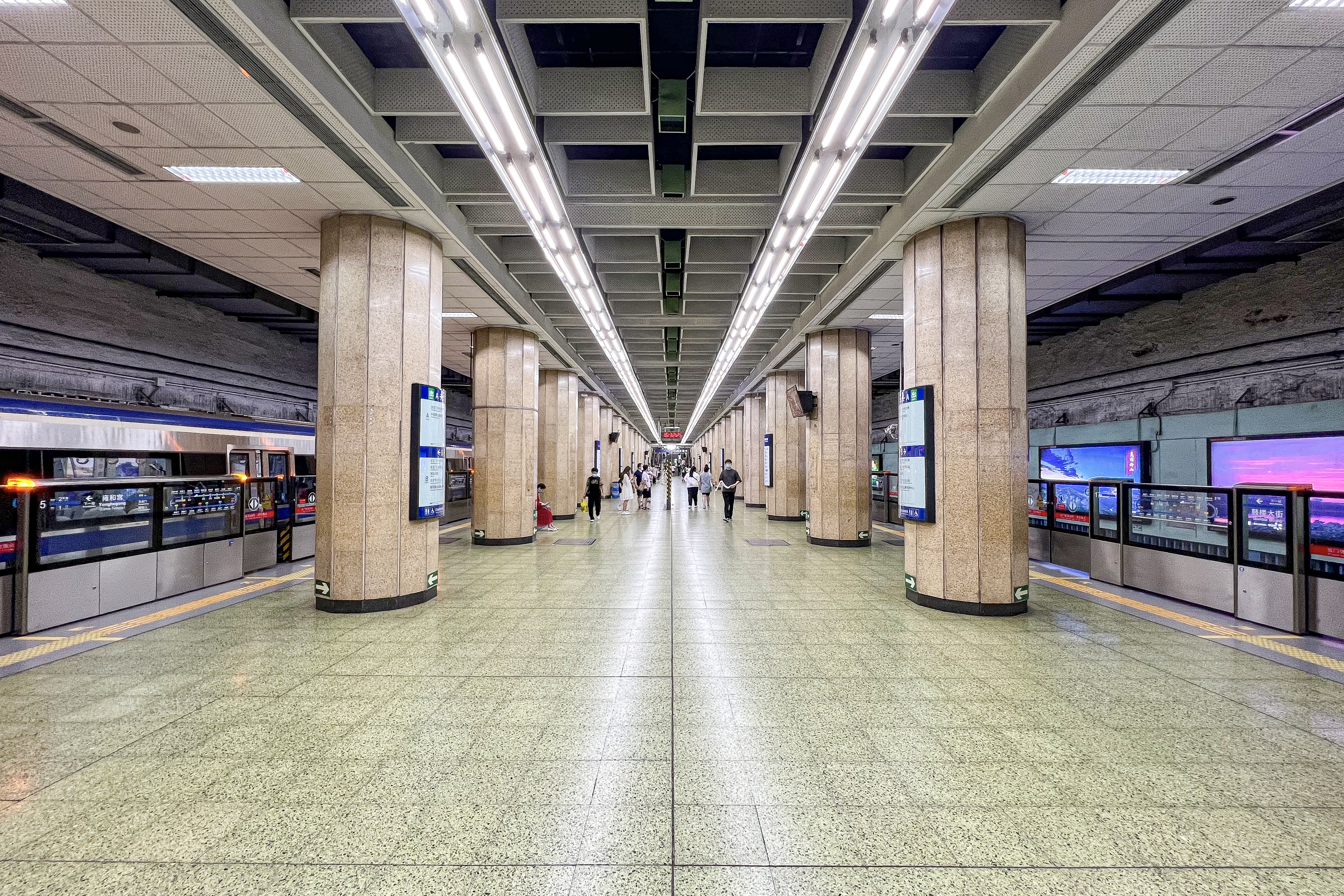
- Platform in June 2023

General information
- Location: Andingmen (North 2nd Ring Road and Andingmen Outer Street (安定门外大街) and Andingmen Inner Street); Dongcheng District, Beijing; China
- Coordinates: 39°56′57″N 116°24′30″E
- Operator: Beijing Mass Transit Railway Operation Corporation Limited
- Line: Line 2
- Platforms: 2 (1 island platform)
- Tracks: 2

Construction
- Structure type: Underground
- Accessible: Yes

Other information
- Station code: 216

History
- Opened: September 20, 1984; 41 years ago

Services
Preceding station	Beijing Subway	Following station
Gulou Dajie outer loop / anticlockwise	Line 2	Yonghegong Lama Temple inner loop / clockwise
Location
- Location within Beijing

Anding Men Station (Chinese: 安定门站; pinyin: Āndìng Mén Zhàn) is a station on Line 2 of the Beijing Subway. The station is named after Andingmen, a city gate in Beijing's city wall, which was torn down during the construction of the subway in the late 1960s.

== Station layout ==
The station has an underground island platform.

== Exits ==
There are 2 exits, lettered A and B. Exit A is accessible.
