= Andingmen Bridge =

Bridge in Beijing, China

Coordinates: 39.9477°N 116.4021°E

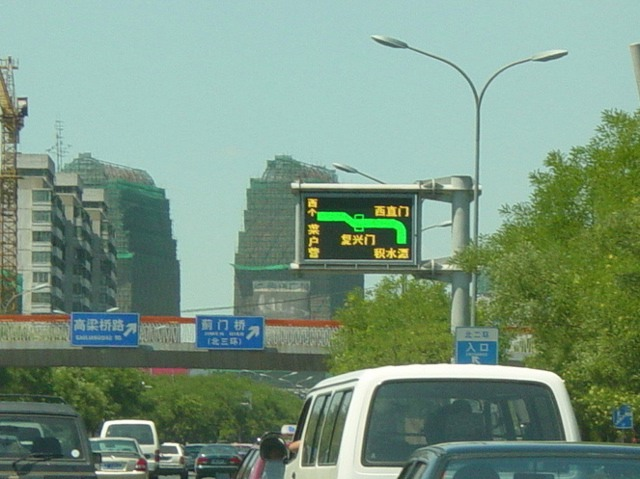
2nd Ring Road (二环路) a few kilometers after passing Andingmen

Andingmen Bridge (Chinese: 安定门桥; pinyin: Āndìngménqiáo) is a roundabout interchange bridge located on the 2nd Ring Road in Beijing. It sits on the demolished Andingmen. The Andingmen Outer Street passes directly over the 2nd Ring Road. It sits directly south of Anzhen Bridge (安贞桥). Because the Ring Road is often a traffic bottleneck, the northern stretch between Andingmen and Xiaojie Bridge is often jammed, particularly in the lead to the turn-off for the Airport Expressway. The same goes for part of the road around the Deshengmen Bridge (德胜门桥) and all of the western side.

== See also ==
- Andingmen
- 2nd Ring Road (Beijing)
