= Yongdingmen =

Former gate of Beijing's old city wall

Coordinates: 39.871°N 116.393°E

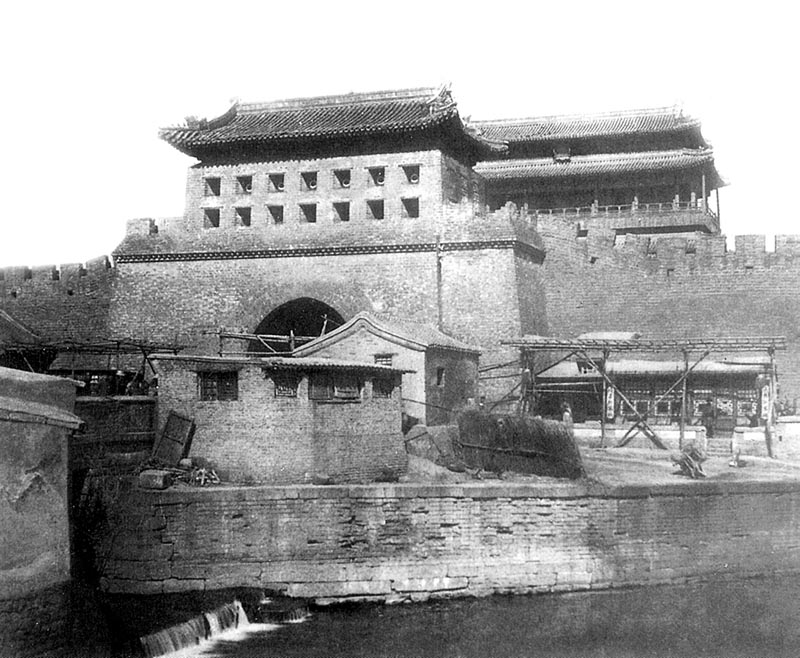
Yongdingmen's gate tower and watchtower in 1922, photo by Osvald Sirén

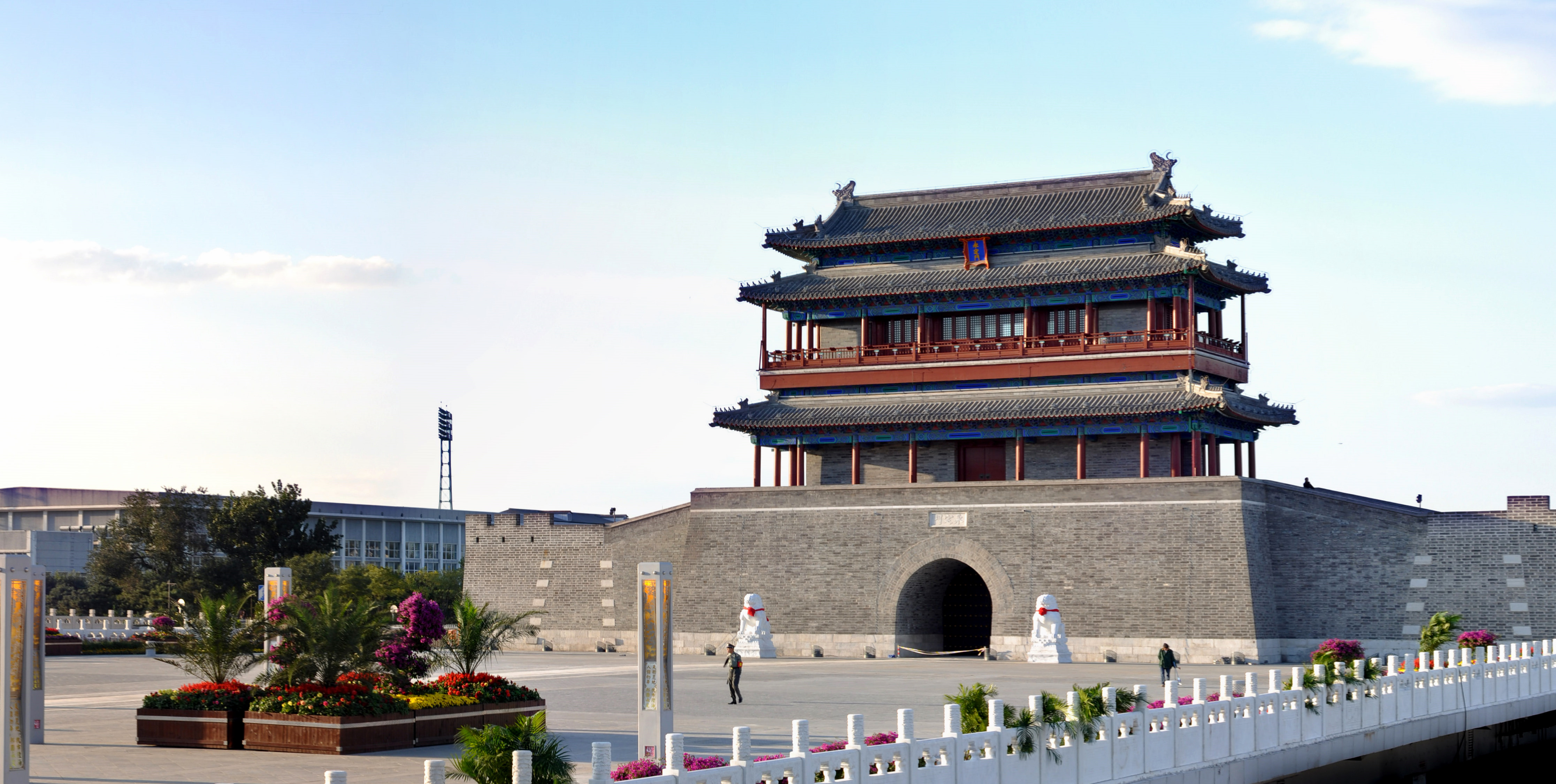
The reconstructed Yongdingmen gate

Yongdingmen (simplified Chinese: 永定门; traditional Chinese: 永定門; pinyin: Yǒngdìngmén; lit. 'Gate of Perpetual Peace') was the former front gate of the outer city of Beijing's old city wall. Originally built in 1553 during Ming Dynasty, it was torn down in the 1950s to make way for the new road system in Beijing. In 2005, the Yongdingmen was reconstructed at the site of the old city gate. This new gate is disconnected from the original road leading towards the gate and into the city (see photograph below).

During the Boxer Rebellion, on 11 June 1900, the secretary of the Japanese legation, Sugiyama Akira (杉山 彬), was attacked and killed by the Muslim soldiers of General Dong Fuxiang near Yongdingmen, who were guarding the southern part of the Beijing walled city.

On June 11th occurred the murder of the Japanese Chancellor, Sugiyama, by the Boxers, and Tung Fuhsiang's Kansu' troops. The Chancellor attempted to leave Peking by the Yung-ting gate in order to meet Admiral Seymour's relief force, which was on its way to the capital from Tientsin, and which was apparently expected to reach Peking that day. Sugiyama rode in a cart with a broad red band round the body, denoting that the occupant was of, at least, the second rank. When he arrived at the Yung-ting gate he was accosted by a number of Tung Fu-hsiang's men who were guarding it. It seemed that Prince Tuan had that day given secret orders that no foreigner was to be allowed either to leave the city or enter it. He was therefore stopped and asked who he was. Sugiyama told them that he was a member of the Japanese legation. "Are you the Japanese minister?" "No, I am only a chancellor of the legation." "Then what right have you, a petty officer like that, to ride in such a high official's cart?" So they pulled him out of his cart and began to mob the unlucky Chancellor. Sugiyama then demanded to be brought before General Tung Fu-hsiang. "What! You to speak to our Great General! (Ta Shuei.) Why, you are too insignificant to have such an honor!" At last, however, a red-buttoned Kansu officer appeared on the scene, to whom Sugiyama appealed for help. Instead of doing so the ruffian merely ordered the Japanese Chancellor's head to be struck off as a sacrifice to their war banner, and stuck near the gate, "for trying to break but of Peking." Sugiyama was the first foreigner murdered inside Peking. The great mass of the population of Peking were greatly alarmed at these blood-thirsty proceedings, and all were expecting that the Empress Dowager would show some disapproval of the murder of the Japanese Chancellor, belonging to a friendly State, and the member of an Embassy; but the Manchus, one and all, were jubilant when they heard of the murder. Finally the official seal of approval from the highest quarter for this dastardly murder was made by Prince Tuan, who, when he met General Tung Fu-hsiang the next morning, slapped the latter on the back and raising his right thumb called out "Hao" (good!) The raising of the thumb denotes that the person addressed is a "first-class hero."

— China and the Boxers: A short history of the Boxer outbreak, with two chapters on the sufferings of missionaries and a closing one on the outlook, Zephaniah Charles Beals, pp. 73-5.

June 11th.—On this day the general body of General Tung's troops that had remained in the South Park entered the Yungting-men. This is the central gate of the Chinese city on the South. They met a secretary, Sugiyama, of the Japanese Legation who was leaving Peking in order to meet the foreign troops coming to Peking. General Tung's troops asked him who he was. He replied he was an official secretary of the Japanese Legation. The soldiers objected to this, if you are an official secretary why do you use a cart with a red band round it. They seized his ear and made him come off the cart. The secretary knew that it was not a time to reason the matter. He said in a conciliatory tone "Kindly allow me to see your commander, to him I will apologize." The soldiers said, "There is no need." "Then," said he, "I will later on invite your commander to my Legation and my Minister will apologize." The officers with their swords, then killed him by cutting open his abdomen. The Japanese Minister on hearing it asked permission to have the body taken back to the city for burial. After a long time permission was given. Prince Tuan afterwards on seeing General Tung put out his thumb and said, "You are indeed a hero."

— The Boxer Rising: A History of the Boxer Trouble in China, pp. 59-60. The Boxer Rising: A History of the Boxer Trouble in China. Reprinted from the "Shanghai Mercury.", pp. 46-7.
