= The Walls and Gates of Peking =

1924 book by Osvald Sirén

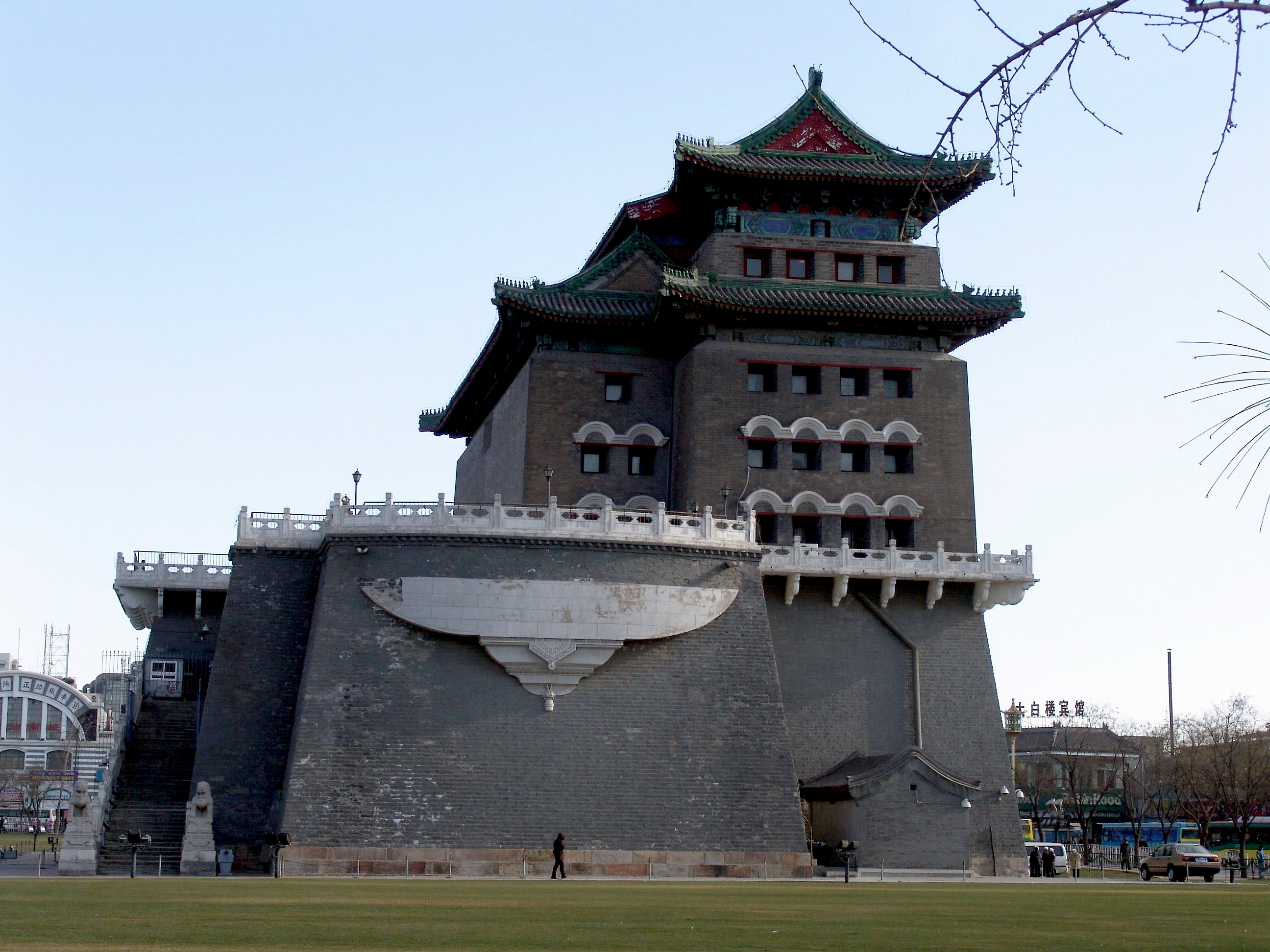
- Qianmen
- Author: Osvald Sirén
- Language: English
- Subject: Architecture
- Publisher: The Bodley Head
- Publication date: 1924
- Publication place: Sweden

The Walls and Gates of Peking is a book written by Osvald Sirén, originally published in English with a run of 800 copies by The Bodley Head in London in 1924. It provides historical records of the walls and gates of Beijing and has 109 photos taken by Osvald Siren and 53 architectural drawings of gates made by Chinese artists.
