= Beijing city fortifications =

Ancient walls and towers around the Chinese city

Fortifications of Beijing city

The Beijing city fortifications were a system of walls with towers and gates constructed in the city of Beijing, China in the early 1400s and mostly demolished in the 1950s and 1960s. The entire perimeter of the Inner and Outer city walls stretched for approximately 60 kilometres (37 mi).

Beijing was the capital of China for the majority of the Yuan, Ming, and Qing dynasties, as well as a secondary capital of the Liao and Jin dynasties. As such, the city required an extensive fortification system around the Forbidden City, the Imperial City, the Inner City, and the Outer City. Fortifications included gate towers, gates, archways, watchtowers, barbicans, barbican towers, barbican gates, barbican archways, sluice gates, sluice gate towers, enemy sighting towers, corner guard towers, and a moat system. It had the most extensive defense system in Imperial China.

After the collapse of the Qing dynasty in 1911, Beijing's fortifications were gradually dismantled. The Forbidden City has remained largely intact and has become the Palace Museum. Most of the Inner City fortifications were demolished 1965 for the construction of the 2nd Ring Road and Line 2 of the Beijing Subway. Some fortifications remain intact, including Tiananmen, the gate tower and watchtower at Zhengyangmen, the watchtower at Deshengmen, the southeastern corner guard tower, and a 1.5-kilometre (0.93 mi)-long section of the Inner city wall near Chongwenmen, just south of the Beijing railway station. The latter two components now form the Beijing Ming City Wall Ruins Park. Almost all of the walls of the Outer City and all of its gates were demolished during the 1950s. Yongdingmen was completely reconstructed in 2004.

== History ==
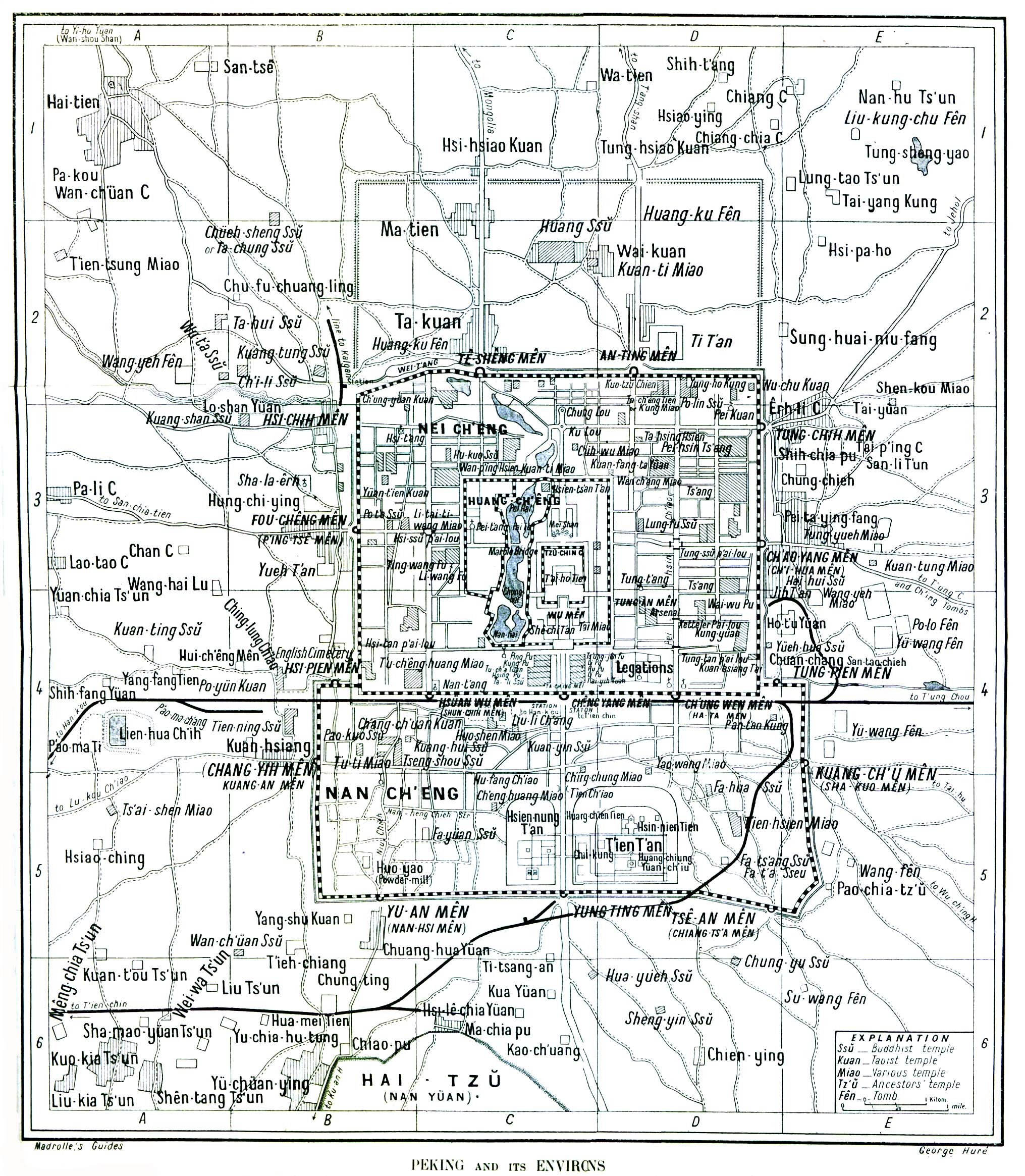
Map of Beijing (1912) showing the walls of the inner and Outer city and the Forbidden City and remnants of the Yuan dynasty walls

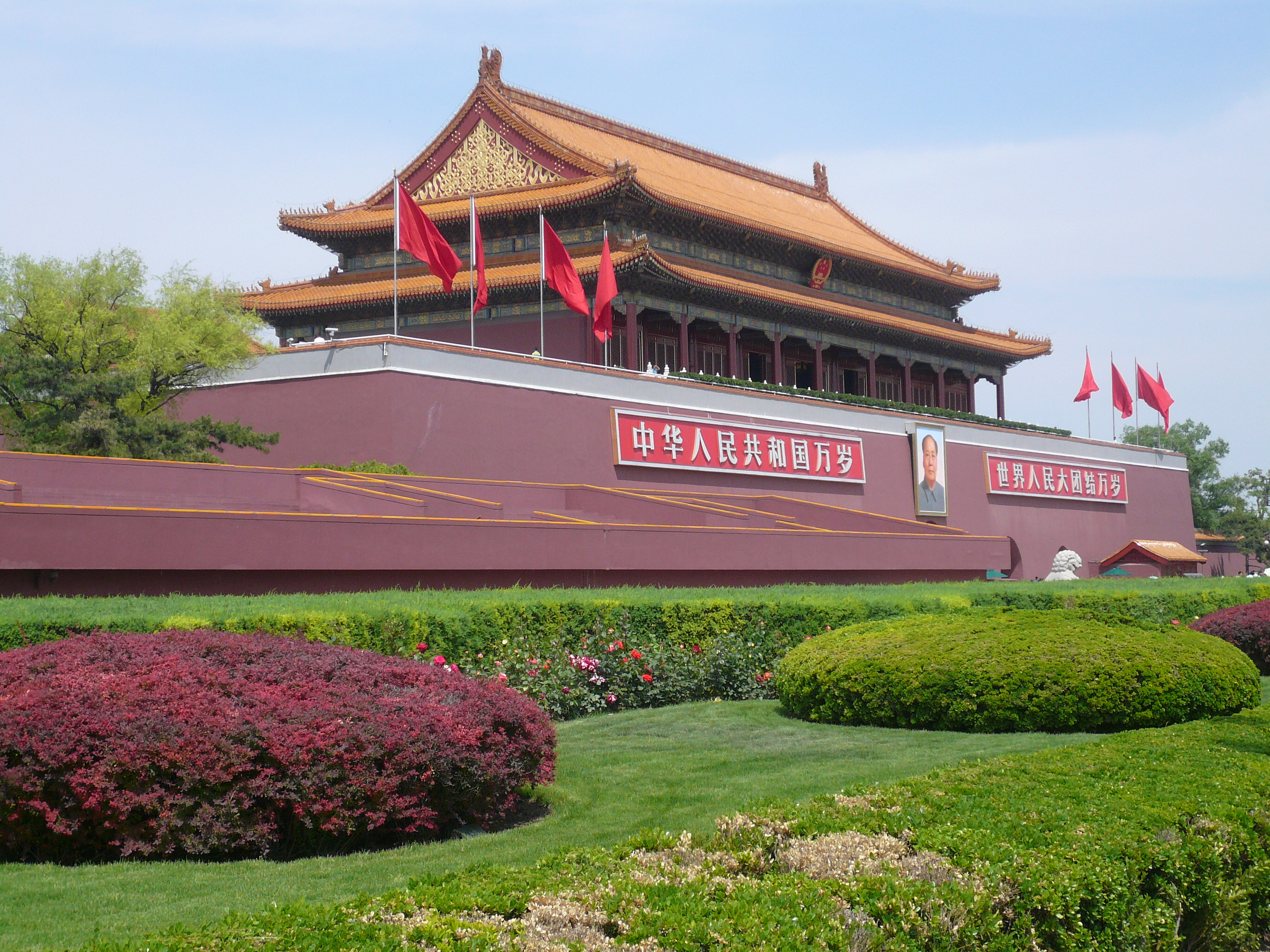
Tiananmen

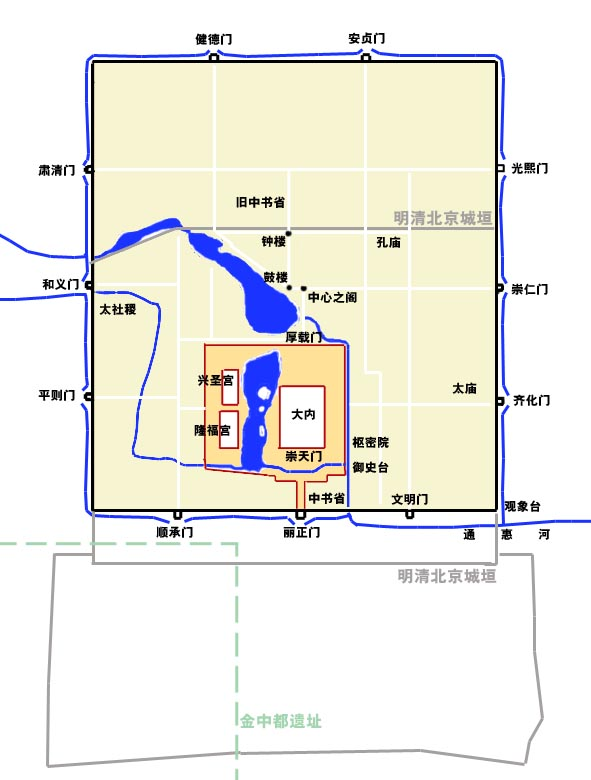
The fortification system of Dadu. The Jin dynasty city of Zhongdu was located to the southwest. The area covered by the Ming-era Beijing is outlined in grey.

The city of Dadu, the forerunner of Beijing in the Ming and Qing dynasties, was built in 1264 by the Yuan dynasty. Dadu had 11 city gates. The eastern, southern, and western sides had three gates per side, and the northern wall had two gates. The three eastern gates, from north to south, were called Guangximen (光熙门), Chongrenmen (崇仁门), and Qihuamen (齐化门). The three western gates, from north to south, were called Suqingmen (肃清门), Heyimen (和义门), and Pingzemen (平则门). The three southern gates, from west to east, were called Shunchengmen (顺承门), Lizhengmen (丽正门), and Wenmingmen (文明门). The two northern gates, from west to east, were called Jiandemen (健德门) and Anzhenmen (安贞门).

In August 1368 General Xu Da of the Ming dynasty captured the city from the last Yuan emperor, Emperor Shun. Xu Da decided that Dadu's fortification system was too large to defend during a siege, so he ordered the city's northern walls rebuilt 2.8 kilometres (1.7 miles) to the south of the original location. This construction pre-empted the planned northern expansion of the city. The new wall was constructed with an extra layer of bricks, further strengthening the city's defenses.

The original northern walls were abandoned after 1372, but were still used as a secondary defense during the Ming dynasty. During the rebellion of An Da, there were some Ming troops stationed at those gates. Only a small part of the northern and western sections of the Dadu city walls remain, as well as parts of the moat system in those areas. The southern half of the rammed earth wall of the barbican at Suqingmen is also still visible today.

In 1370, the Hongwu Emperor granted his fourth son, Zhu Di (later Yongle Emperor) the title 'King of the Yan dependency', whose capital was at Beiping (present-day Beijing). In 1379, the new palace was completed, and Zhu Di moved in the subsequent year.

In 1403, Zhu Di changed the name of the city from Beiping ("northern peace") to Beijing ("northern capital"). In 1406, he began planning a move of his capital from Nanjing to Beijing. At that time, Beijing was just the capital of the dependency of the kingdom of Yan; therefore it did not have very extensive fortifications. Extensive expansion and reconstruction work would be needed to meet the defence requirements of the new capital for it to withstand the sporadic Mongol incursions from the north. This marked the beginning of the construction of the Ming sections of Beijing's fortifications.

Construction work on the Xinei ("inner west") began in 1406, upon the foundations of the Yan King's Palace. It was finished the following year. In 1409, Jianshouling was completed at Mount Tianshou in the Changping District. In 1416 construction of the Forbidden City complex began, in a style that imitated the original Nanjing Imperial Palace. The Forbidden City's halls, palaces, and pavilions, such as Taimiao, Ancestor Hall, Mount Wansui, Taiye Lake, residences of the Ten Kings, residences of the imperial princes, residences of the officials and the Drum and Bell Towers were built at this time. The southern city walls were moved south by 0.8 kilometres (0.50 mi) to allow more space for the future Imperial City complex. In 1421 the capital of Ming dynasty China was officially moved from Nanjing ("southern capital") to Beijing ("northern capital"). The Temple of Heaven, the Temple of Earth and Xiannong Temple were built in what was then the southern suburbs. Some sources indicate that the central axis of the city was moved eastwards to subdue the previous dynasty's Qi (new Qi comes from the east, where the sun rises daily).

A second expansion of the city occurred between 1436 and 1445, on the orders of Emperor Ying of the Ming dynasty. Major works included the addition of an extra layer of bricks on the interior side of the city walls, creating the southern end at Taiye Lake, construction of gate towers, barbicans and watchtowers at nine major city gates, construction of the four corner guard towers, setting up a Paifang on the outside of each major city gate and replacing wooden moat bridges with stone bridges. Sluices were built under the bridges and revetments of stone and brick were added to the embankment of the moat.

The newly expanded city wall and moat system was 45 li (22.5 kilometres (14.0 mi)) around the perimeter, providing formidable defence. The Imperial Tombs were built on the outskirts of the city. Changping city, a supply city, interior sections of the Great Wall and other distant fortifications were built for the protection of Beijing during a siege.

The city faced many invasions from the Mongols. In 1476 construction of an outer city was proposed. In 1553, a large rectangular outer city wall and moat system was completed to the south of the original city, forming a shape similar to the "凸" character. This defensive perimeter was maintained for nearly 400 years.

The wall and moat defense system was retained unchanged by the Qing dynasty (1644–1912). However, the imperial city was completely redesigned. Many houses that had been used as residences by Ming dynasty inner cabinet officials were converted into housing for commoners, as were many imperial officials' offices, servants' quarters, warehouses, and hay storage barns. The Han Chinese were forced to live in the Outer City or outside the city, as the Inner City residences became exclusively homes for the Eight Banners—Manchus related to the emperor. Additional housing was built in the Inner city for imperial relatives, along with Buddhist temples of the Gelug sect. The "Three Mounts Five Gardens" park in the western suburbs was also built at this time.

When the British first arrived in Beijing during the Qing dynasty, they recorded the four sectors of the city on newspaper as: Chinese City (Outer City), Tartar City (Inner City), Imperial City and Forbidden City.

== Dismantling ==
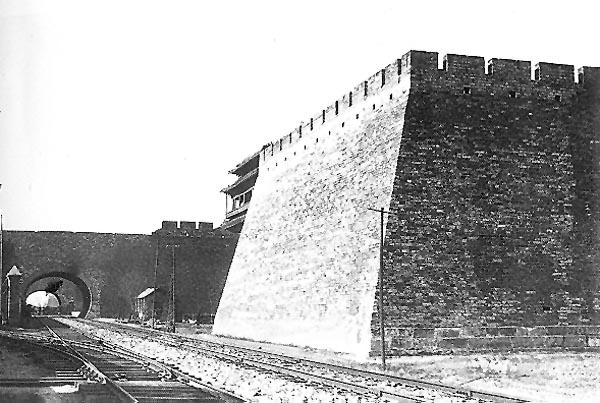
Beijing Inner city Chongwenmen barbican as seen in 1902. The sluice gate of the barbican has already been dismantled by British forces. A railway arch was built underneath.

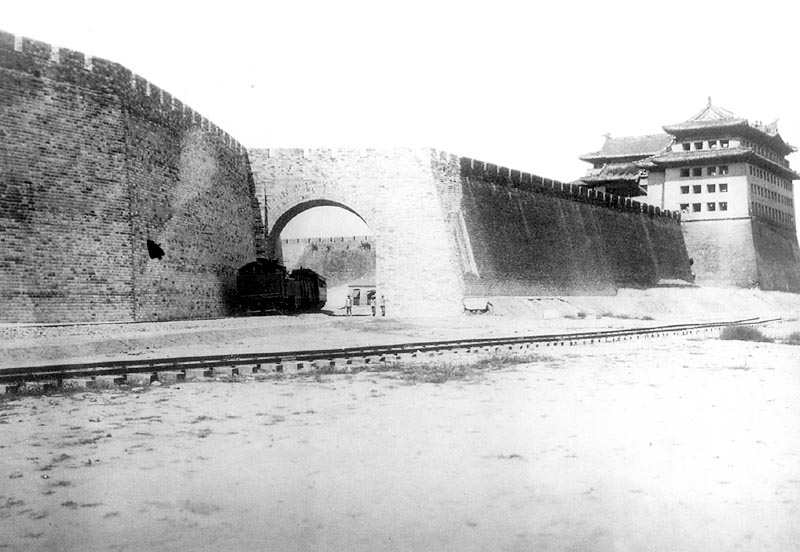
Beijing Inner city northeast corner guard tower, where an arch was made for the passage of trains

Historical records indicate that when Li Zicheng retreated from the city in 1644, he ordered that the Ming Imperial palace complex and the major city gates be set afire. But in 1960, when the walls were finally dismantled, the workers realized that the Dongzhimen and Chongwenmen towers and gate sections were the Ming originals.

The wall and moat systems were well maintained during the Ming and Qing dynasties, right up until 1900. It was not permitted to drill holes or cut arches in walls. Any damage—even just a single missing brick—was swiftly reported to the authorities and repaired.

Much damage was done to the fortifications during the Boxer Rebellion (1898–1901). The Righteous Harmony Society burned down the gate tower at Zhengyangmen, and its watchtower was destroyed by Indian troops. The watchtowers at Chaoyangmen and Chongwenmen were destroyed by artillery fire from Japanese and British forces, and the guard tower at the northwest corner of the Inner City was destroyed by Russian cannons. British troops tore down the western section of the Outer City walls at Yongdingmen and the city walls surrounding the Temple of Heaven. They moved the terminus of the Beijing–Fengtian Railway from Majiapu, outside the city, to the grounds of the Temple of Heaven, where the British and American forces were headquartered. This was the first time since the Ming dynasty that the city walls had been breached. In 1901, British troops tore down the eastern section of the Outer city walls at Yongdingmen to allow an extension of the railway eastwards to Zhengyangmen. This enabled the construction of the Zhengyangmen East railway station (the present Qianmen Station). Here, British embassy and consulate staff could board trains to travel to the port city of Tientsin (now Tianjin) in the event of the need to retreat. British troops also tore down the eastern section of the Outer city wall near Dongbianmen for the construction of the Beijing Dongbianmen-Tongzhou feeder railway.

The Imperial government of Qing China collapsed in 1911. Between 1912 and 1949, the Republic of China Beiyang government and Nationalist government all undertook minor deconstruction and adjustment work. When the Beijing circum-city railway was built in 1915, the sight towers at the northeast and southeast corners were dismantled and the side walls of the guard towers at these corners had arches built as passageways for trains. The barbican and sluice gates at Deshengmen, Andingmen, Chaoyangmen, and Dongzhimen were dismantled for the passage of trains. The barbican at Zhengyangmen was dismantled to ease traffic in the Qianmen area. Arches for trains were cut in the city walls near Hepingmen, Jianguomen, Fuxingmen and several other minor gates. The walls of the Imperial city were fully dismantled, except for the south to southwest section.

The gate towers, watchtowers, and corner towers of the major gates of both the Inner City and Outer City were dismantled over time due to lack of funds for maintenance. But when the People's Republic of China was founded in 1949, the majority of the moats and gate towers were extant, albeit in a dilapidated state.

In 1949, Beijing became the capital of the newly founded Communist government. Government-sponsored city planning studies showed that the remaining wall and moat structures were hindering traffic flow and were a barrier to expansion and development. The Outer city wall was completely dismantled in the 1950s, and the inner walls were torn down starting in 1953.

Meanwhile, a debate was raging as to whether to keep or to dismantle the remaining city walls. Architect Liang Sicheng was a leading advocate for keeping the walls. He recommended cutting more arches to accommodate new roads that would serve increased traffic needs, and suggested building a giant public park immediately outside the city walls and moats to beautify the environment. Pro-keep supporters included Redologist Yu Pingbo, then Department of Culture Vice Minister Zheng Zhenduo and many Soviet city planners then in the country. The pro-keep contingent was silenced by political pressure, and by the end of the Great Leap Forward (1958–1961), the Outer city wall was completely dismantled and the Inner wall was halved in length.

During the 1960s, relations between China and the Soviet Union soured. After the Sino-Soviet split, people felt that war with the Soviet Union was inevitable. Underground bomb shelters, underground "supply cities", and an underground railway—the Beijing Subway—were commissioned. Work on the Subway began on 1 July 1965. The construction technique used was cut-and-cover: wherever the path of the subway was to go, everything on the surface had to be demolished. Since demolishing houses and relocating people would have been such a great undertaking, the decision was made to build the subway line where the city walls and moats were located.

The demolition work, which began in 1965, was under the supervision of Beijing city government's roads and development department. People and factories that hoped to gain access to building materials from the city's fortifications volunteered to participate in the demolition. After construction began on the metro system, troops were brought in to help with the demolition work to increase the speed and efficiency of the process. The first section of walls to be removed were the southern portion of the Inner city wall, Xuanwumen, and Chongwenmen, leaving behind a 23.6 km (14.7 mi) ditch. The second stage began at Beijing railway station in the southeast corner of the Inner City and passed through the sites of Jianguomen, Andingmen, Xizhimen, and Fuxingmen. Towers and walls were removed and another 16.04 kilometres (9.97 mi) of ditch was created. A section of wall near Xibianmen about 100 metres (330 ft) long was used as a storage area for raw materials, and thus was spared from demolition. Another section from Chongwenmen to the guard tower at the southeast corner of the Inner City was spared, because the subway line veered towards the Beijing railway station. The tops of the walls were dismantled, making it no longer possible to walk along the top of them. Beginning in 1972, in order to pave the 2nd Ring Road above the Subway, and to serve high-rise apartments and hotels in the Qianmen area, Beijing's eastern, southern, and western moats were covered and converted to sewers.

In 1979, the government called off the demolition of the remaining city walls and designated them as cultural heritage sites. By this time, the only intact sections were the gate tower and watchtower at Zhengyangmen, the watchtower at Deshengmen, the guard tower at the southeast corner, the northern moats of the Inner city, the section of the Inner city wall south of the Beijing railway station, and a small section of Inner city wall near Xibianmen.

== Defense ==
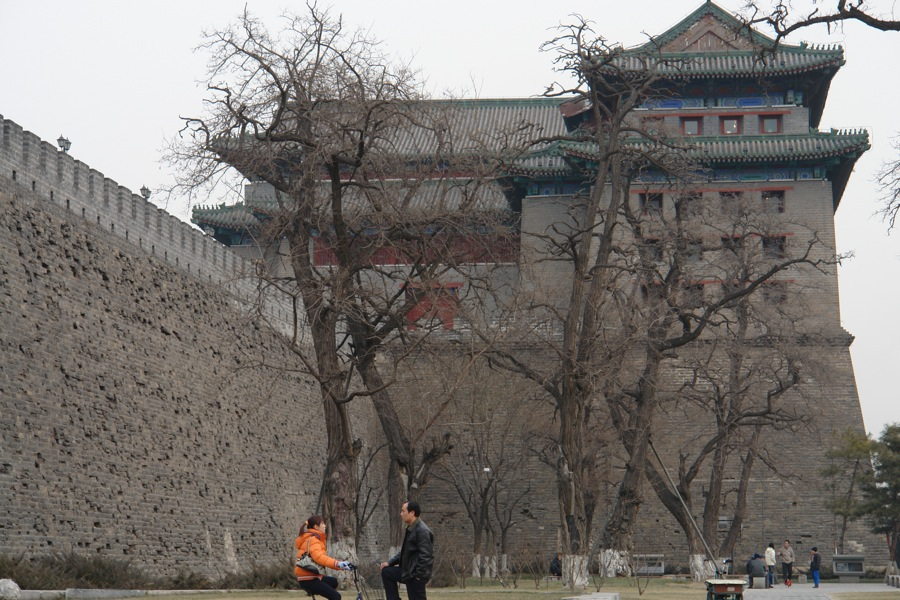
Ming era southeastern corner tower of the city wall

The defense system of Beijing during the Ming and Qing dynasties included city walls, moats, gate towers, barbicans, watchtowers, corner guard towers, enemy sight towers, and military encampments both outside and inside the city. The mountains immediately north of the city and the interior Great Wall sections on those mountain ranges also acted as a defensive perimeter.

During the Ming dynasty, troops under permanent encampment in and around Beijing were called Jingjun or Jingying ("capital troops"). During the Yongle era (1402–1424), they were organized into three groups, called Wujunying (consisting of the majority of the army), Sanqianying (consisting of mercenary and allied Mongol troops), and Shenjiying (consisting of troops using firearms). The three ying were further divided into 72 wei, organised into five groups named Zhongjun (centre), Zuoyejun (left middle), Youyejun (right middle), Zuoshaojun (left guard), and Youshaojun (right guard); these were collectively known as the Wujunying ("five troops"). The majority of the Jingjun were headquartered outside of west Deshengguan. Some camped in the rural districts of the capital area, at Nanyuan, Tonzhou, Lugouqiao, Changping, and the Juyongguan interior Great Wall. During the Tumu Crisis in 1449, the entire Jingjun was destroyed, a loss of some 500,000 men. Yu Qian then changed the organisational structure of the force, bringing approximately 100,000 well-trained troops from several different camps into one supergroup: the 10-battalion supergroup. This was raised to 12 battalions during the reign of Emperor Xian of the Ming dynasty. These were commanded from within the Inner city at Dongguanting and Xiguanting. Drilling and training fields outside of the city walls could also be used as temporary encampments. The original Wujunying, Sanqianying, and Shenjiying were converted to guard units in charge of protecting the Imperial city and the Forbidden city. Later the Imperial guards were joined by the Jinyiwei and the Tengxiangwei, whose commanders included "Mianyiwei Dahan General", "Hongkui General", "Mingjia General", "Bazong Director", and several others. A guard post in the Imperial city called "Hongpu" was formed. The city gates were closed at night and no one was allowed in or out unless special permission was given though one exception was the carts that continually brought spring water from Mount Yuquan. The city streets had guards on constant patrol at night. Some streets had barricades erected at night to keep traffic away. The city walls normally had no soldiers on station, day or night. Most lived under the walls in encampments, with a few doing night shifts at gate towers, watchtowers and enemy sight towers. Only when there was danger of enemy attack were soldiers stationed atop the city walls. During the Ming dynasty, Beijing was often under siege by Mongol and Manchu forces. The city of Beijing was totally closed many times, with commoners forbidden entrance into the city.

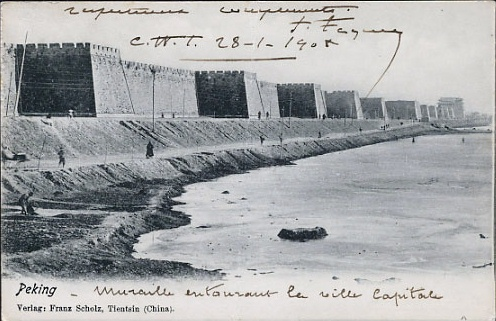
Beijing city wall and moat, shown on an early 1900s postcard.

During the Qing dynasty, Beijing's defense forces mainly relied on the Xiaoqiying, who were scattered in encampments within the Inner city, then mainly inhabited by Manchus. They were organized into Eight Banners: the Xianghuang banner at Andingmen, the Zhenghuang banner at Deshengmen, the Zhengbai banner at Dongzhimen, the Xiangbai banner at Chaoyangmen, the Zhenghong banner at Xizhimen, the Xianghong banner at Fuchengmen, the Zhenglan banner at Chongwenmen and the Xianglan banner at Xuanwumen. Each banner had an office hall, several troop barracks, a patrol station and a warehouse. In addition to the Xiaoqiying, troops permanently encamped in and around Beijing included the Qianfengying, Hujunying, Bujun Xunbuying, Jianruiying, Huoqiying (in charge of artillery), Shenjiying (first begun in 1862), and the Huqiangying (in charge of guns). From the Yongzheng era (1722–1735) onwards, the Eight Banner guard troops in charge of protecting the imperial leisure parks were camped in the area around the Old Summer Palace and Fragrant Hills. The same system of Eight Banners was in place for the nine gates of the Inner city. The troops consisted of an equal distribution of Manchu, Mongol, and Han soldiers. The soldiers of the Chengmenling, in charge of protecting the city gates, came from these banners: Andingmen the Zhenglan banner, Deshengmen the Xianglan banner, Dongzhimen the Xiangbai banner, Xizhimen the Xianghong banner, Chaoyangmen the Zhengbai banner, Fuchengmen the Zhenghong banner, Chongwenmen the Xianghuang banner, Xuanwumen the Zhenghuang banner and Zhengyangmen rotated between the eight banners. The Outer city's seven gates were manned by Han troops from the following banners: Dongbianmen the Xianghuang banner, Xibianmen the Zhenghuang banner, Guangqumen the Zhengbai banner, Guang'anmen the Zhenghong banner, Zuo'anmen the Xianglan and Xiangbai banners, You'anmen the Xianghong banner and Yongdingmen the Zhenglan banner. In 1728 permanent barracks were built for the eight banners in the Inner city, excepting Zhengyangmen. Each gate had barracks of 460 rooms for a ying, 90 rooms for a ban, and 15 rooms for a geng, for a total of 3,680 rooms. Outside the city walls were an additional 16,000 rooms, with each banner having 2,000 rooms. Manchu troops were allocated 1,500 rooms and Han troops 500 rooms. There were also 135 storage rooms atop the Inner city walls, 106 of which were for military equipment such as direction flags, cannons, gunpowder, and guns. In 1835, 241 houses of three rooms each were added to the nine gates of the Inner city, as the original straw and earthen barracks were deteriorating. Twenty-eight store rooms were added, as well as 3,616 Outer city barracks. During the Qing dynasty (1644–1911), the Xiaoqiying soldiers usually lived outside the city gates rather than on the city walls. This proved to be easier for defending the city during a siege. Only when the emperor was leaving the city for Yuanmingyuan or the Temple of Heaven did the soldiers station themselves atop the walls. An exception was Xuanwumen; as the only gate that stayed open at night, the top of the wall was continually manned. Cannons were fired at noon atop Xuanwumen to mark the time.

During the Ming and Qing dynasties, the principal defensive weapons were firelocks, cannons, and bows and arrows. In 1629, Houjin troops attacked Beijing, and in 1644, Li Zicheng's troops laid siege to Beijing. Troops atop the city walls used cannons extensively during both sieges. During the Second Opium War (1856–1860), invading troops stationed outside the city walls gave up, because Beijing was too extensively protected. Between 13 August and 15 August 1900, when the Eight-Nation Alliance invaded Beijing, the fortifications withstood bombardment by cannon attacks for two full days before being overrun. The Qing forces took full advantage of their higher elevation and the protection of the thick walls to shoot Alliance troops. Russian and Japanese forces attempted several times to use nitrocellulose to blow a gap in the wall at Dongzhimen and Chaoyangmen, but failed because the soldiers could not get close enough to light the fuse without being shot. The barbicans, enemy sight towers, and corner guard towers proved to be quite effective at deterring enemy attacks. For example, on the night of 13 August, Russian troops succeeded in invading Dongbianmen's watchtower, but suffered heavy casualties in the barbican. It wasn't until the late morning of 14 August that they conquered the gate tower at Dongbianmen, a mere 50 metres (160 ft) away. Even after the Outer City and Inner City fell to Alliance forces, the Imperial city's defenses still held. On the morning of 15 August, American forces used several guns to try to destroy the Tiananmen gates, but they held. Japanese troops used ladders to scale the wall and open the gates, thus allowing Alliance troops into the Imperial city. In an incident on 25 July 1937, a battalion of Japanese troops camped at Fengtai District, declaring that they intended "to protect Japanese immigrants" and "to protect Dongjiaomin Street's Embassy district", tried to advance into Beijing. When they began entering Guang'anmen, around twenty Chinese soldiers fired on them from atop the gate tower, forcing them to abandon their plan. Thus even in the modern era of the 1930s and 1940s, the dilapidated fortifications were still useful defensively.

== Inner city ==
Map of the Inner city (1861–1890)

Beijing's Inner city is also called Jingcheng ("capital city") or Dacheng ("big city"). The eastern and western sections were originally part of the Yuan city of Dadu, while the northern and southern sections were built during the early Ming dynasty in the Hongwu (1368–1398) and Yongle (1402–1424) eras. The walls were formed from rammed earth covered with rocks and a finishing layer of bricks on both the interior and exterior. The average height was 12 to 15 metres. The northern and southern sections, built in the early Ming dynasty, were thicker than the eastern and western sections, built during the Yuan dynasty (1271–1368). The thicker sections averaged 19 to 20 metres at the base and 16 metres at the top, with parapets at the top. The Inner city wall had nine gates and a tower at each corner. There were three sluice gates, 172 enemy sighting towers, and 11,038 battlements. Immediately outside the city walls were deep moats 30 to 60 metres in width.

=== Inner city walls ===
The city walls of Dadu were used as the foundation for the Inner city walls of Beijing. In 1368, after Ming troops entered Dadu, General Xu Da directed Hua Jilong to build a second city wall of rammed earth to the south of the original northern city wall. The new wall was later covered with stones and bricks. In 1372 the original northern city wall was completely dismantled and the materials used to reinforce the new wall. The perimeter of the original Imperial city was measured at that time as 1,206 zhang (approximately 4,020 metres). The perimeter of the southern city was 5,328 zhang (approximately 17,760 metres). The southern city consisted of the remnants of the Jin dynasty capital, Zhongdu.

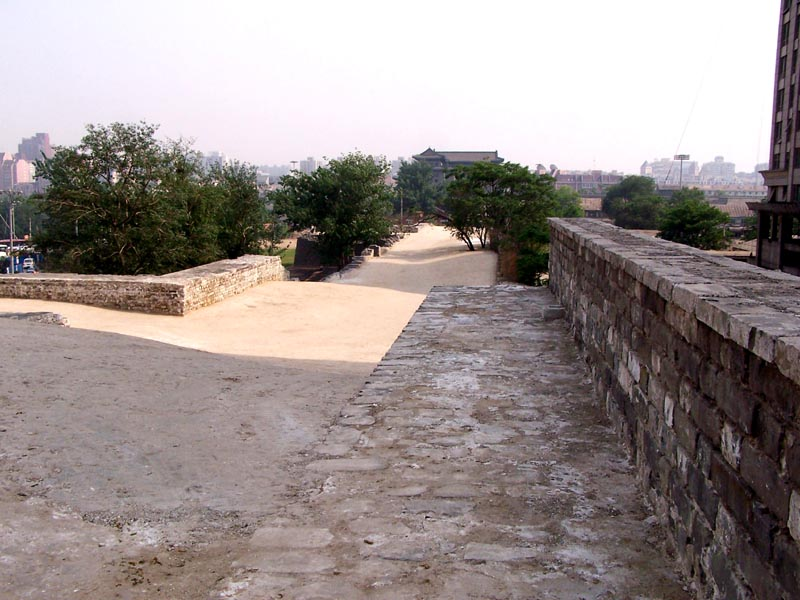
Remnants of the southern section of the Inner City wall near the Southeast Corner Tower in 2006.

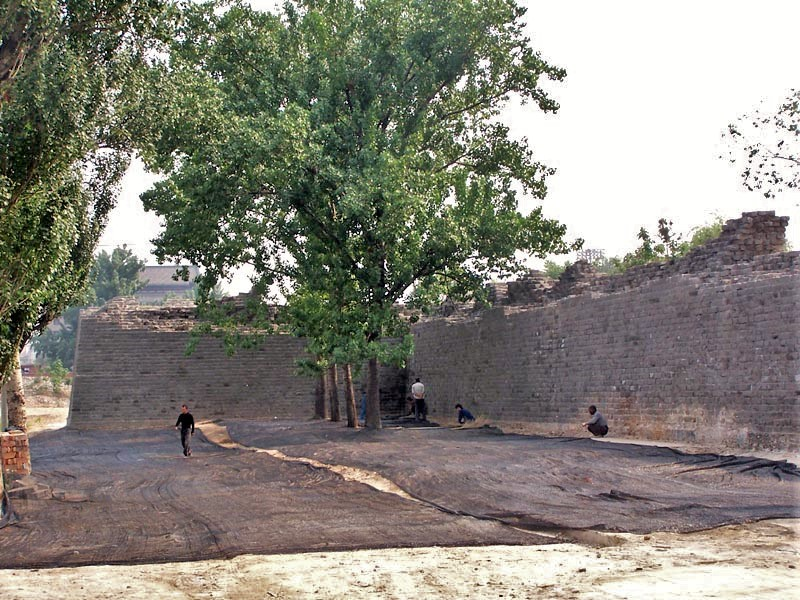
Remnants of the south section of the Inner City wall

After the capital was moved to Beijing in 1406, the southern city wall was moved south by 2 li (about a kilometre). The original Dadu city walls were not destroyed, except for a small section that overlapped the planned Ming Imperial city. Nevertheless, Dadu's southern city walls were gradually torn down by people looking for free bricks and stones. During the Yongle era (1402–1424), the southern, eastern, and western walls were reinforced with stones and bricks. In 1435 construction began on gate towers, watchtowers, barbicans, sluice gates, and corner guard towers for the nine city gates. In 1439 bridges were built leading to the gates. In 1445 the interior walls of the city were reinforced with bricks. The wall and moat system of the Inner city was thus complete.

The walls of the Inner city had a perimeter of 24 kilometres. It was roughly square, with the east and west walls slightly longer due to the north and south walls being moved from their original positions. The northwestern section lacked a vertex; on a map it looks as if the corner had been bitten off. In the Chinese mythological story of Nüwa mending the heavens, "the heavens were missing in the northwest, and the earth was sinking in the southeast". According to scientific investigations done with remote sensing, this area originally had city walls, built in swamps and wetlands. The wall was abandoned in favour of a diagonal connection, placing a small triangle of land outside the city.

Beijing's Inner city came under siege many times; for example, the invasions of Anda Khan and Houjin during the Ming dynasty and the Boxer Rebellion and Eight-Nations Alliance attack during the Qing dynasty. All but the Eight-Nations Alliance were successfully defended against.

After the collapse of the Qing dynasty in 1911, the barbicans at Zhengyangmen, Chaoyangmen, Xuanwemen, Dongzhimen, and Andingmen were dismantled, along with Dong'anmen and the city walls of the Imperial city, to improve traffic flow and to allow for construction of the circum-city railway. In 1924 a new gate was created at Hepingmen to improve traffic flow. Many other gates and archways, such as the Qimingmen (the present Jianguomen) and Chang'anmen (the present Fuxingmen), were opened during this period.

After 1949, the Chinese Communist Party ordered the demolition of the city walls on a giant scale. During the Korean War, in order to ease traffic density, six new archways were built: Dayabao alley archway, Beimencang archway (now called the Dongsi Shitiao archway), North Bell Tower Avenue archway, Xinjiekou archway, West Guanyuan archway, and Songhe'an alley archway.

=== Inner city gates ===
Beijing's Inner city wall had gate towers that sat atop rectangular platforms 12 to 13 metres high integrated into the city walls. Each gate entranceway, centred under the middle of its gate tower platform, had two giant red wooden gates that opened outwards. Iron bulbs were fitted on the exterior side of the gates and gilt copper bulbs on the interior side. When the gates were closed they were locked with giant tree-trunk-sized wooden beams.

The Inner city gate towers were built during the Zhengtong era of the Ming dynasty (1435–1449) in the multi-eaved Xieshanding style. The roofs were covered with grey tubed roof tiles and green glazed tiles. Zhengyangmen's gate tower was seven rooms in length and five rooms in width; Chaoyangmen and Fuchengmen were three rooms in width. Each gate tower had a different floor plan. The gate tower at Zhengyangmen was the tallest and the most imposing Inner city gate tower. Chongwenmen and Xuanwumen were slightly smaller than Zhengyangmen. Dongzhimen and Xizhimen were smaller still, and Deshengmen, Andingmen, Chaoyangmen, are Fuchengmen were the smallest. Each gate tower had two floors. Soldiers could climb to the upper level to have a better view of approaching enemies.

Each gate tower had a watchtower directly in front of it. They were all unique. The watchtower at Zhengyangmen was 38 metres high, 52 metres wide, and 32 metres deep, constructed on a raised platform 12 metres high. This gate, named "Qianmen", was for the exclusive use of the emperor. Built in multi-eaved Xieshanding style, it had grey tubed roof tiles with green glazed tiles at the top. The southern side had seven rooms with 52 arrow slits, and the northern side had five rooms with 21 arrow slits. The eastern and western sides each had 21 arrow slits. The other Inner city watchtowers had exterior designs similar to that of Qianmen, with multi-eaved Xieshanding-style gate towers in the front and a series of five rooms in the back. Both the upper and lower levels of the watchtowers were equipped with arrow slits.

The watchtowers were connected to both the inner walls and outer walls by a structure called a barbican. The barbicans of Dongzhimen or Xizhimen were square; the ones at Zhengyangmen and Deshengmen were rectangular; at Dongbianmen and Xibianmen they were semicircular. Most of the Inner city barbicans had rounded corners, which provided better sight lines and were more difficult to climb or destroy. Each Inner city barbican had a unique design.

Gate	English Translation	Original/Alternate Names	Gate Tower	Watchtower	Barbican	Temples
Zhengyangmen	Gate of the Righteous Sun	Lizhengmen (Gate of the Beautiful Portal)	Two levels; 7 exterior rooms 41 meters wide; 3 interior rooms 21 meters wide; Built on a platform atop the city wall at a height of 13.2 meters	Seven rooms wide; Each floor had 13 arrow slits; Additional towers in the rear had 4 arrow slits on the southern side of upper floors; Eastern and western sides had 4 floors with 4 arrow slits on each floor	108 m wide, 85 m deep; Eastern and western ends had side gates with arches fitted with 500 kg locks	Guandimiao in the west; Guanyinmiao in the east
Chongwenmen	Gate of Respectful Civility	Wendingen (Gate of Civilization)	Three rooms by five; Overall width of 39.1 meters and depth of 24.3 meters; Two floors; Build on a tower platform at a height of 35.5 meters	Similar to Zhengyangmen, but on slightly smaller scale	Enceite width 78 meters, depth 86 meters; Sluice gates and arches on western side	Guandimiao temple in northeastern corner, built facing the south
Xuanwumen	Gate of Advocated Martiality	Shunchengmen	Five rooms wide and three deep; Overall width 32.6 meters, depth of 23 meters; Two levels, 33 meters high	Similar to Zhengyangmen, but on slightly smaller scale	Barbican 75 meters wide, 83 meters deep; Sluice gates on eastern and western sides and one archway on each side	Guandi Temple located on northwestern corner, facing southward
Dongzhimen	Eastern Upright Gate	Chongrenmen	Five rooms long (31.5 meters), 3 rooms wide (15.3 meters), and 2 floors high (34 meters)	Similar to Zhengyangmen, but on slightly smaller scale	Nearly square barbican, smallest of any of the nine Inner city gates; Northern and southern walls 68 meters long; eastern and western walls 62 meters long; Archways and sluice gates on eastern and western sides	Guandi Temple on northeast corner, facing southward
Chaoyangmen	Gate that Faces the Sun	Qihuamen	Similar to Chongwenmen; 31.35 meters wide, 19.2 meters deep, 32 meters high	Similar to Chongwenmen	68 meters wide, 62 meters deep; Sluice gate and archway on northern side	Guandi temple on northeastern corner, facing south
Xizhimen	Western Upright Gate	Heyimen	Similar to Dongzhimen; 32 meters long, 15.6 meters wide, 32.75 meters high	Similar to Dongzhimen	68 meters by 62 meters; Sluice gate and archway on southern side	Guandi temple on northeastern corner, facing south
Fuchengmen	Gate of Abundant Success	Pingzemen	Similar to Chaoyangmen; 31.2 meters by 16 meters and 30 meters high	Similar to Chaoyangmen	74 meters by 65 meters; Sluice gate and archway on northern side	Guandi temple on northeastern corner, facing south
Deshengmen	Gate of Moral Triumph	Diandemen	31.5 meters by 16.8 meters, and 36 meters high		70 meters by 118 meters, second largest after Zhengyangmen; Sluice gate and archway on western side	Zhenwu (Dark Warrior) temple at center of northern side, facing south
Andingmen	Gate of Secured Peace	Anzhenmen	31 meters by 16.05 meters, and 36 meters high		68 meters by 62 meters; Sluice gate and archway on western side	Zhenwu temple

==== Zhengyangmen ====
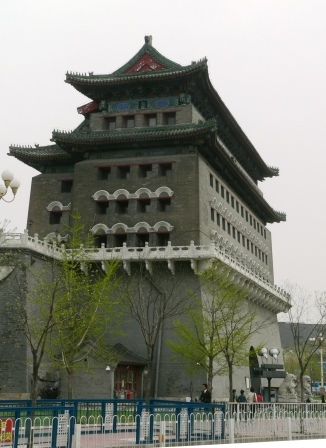
Zhengyangmen watchtower

Zhengyangmen ('Gate of the Righteous Sun'), completed in 1419, was located at the centre of the southern wall of the Inner city. It was constructed in the triple-eaved Xieshanding style, with green glazed tiles. Originally called Lizhengmen ("Gate of the Beautiful Portal"), the name was changed during the Zhengtong era (1435–1449).

Each Inner city barbican contained a temple, and the barbican at Zhengyangmen had two: Guandimiao in the west and Guanyinmiao in the east. Guandimiao had Ming original statues, including the "three treasures" of Guandimiao: a precious sword, a Guandi painting, and a white jade horse statue. The Qing emperor would visit Guandimiao and light some incense each time he returned from a visit to the Temple of Heaven. The temples of Guandimiao and Guanyinmiao were dismantled during the Cultural Revolution.

The watchtower at Zhengyangmen was damaged by fire in 1900 during the Boxer Rebellion. The Hui and Dongxiang Muslim Kansu Braves under Muslim General Ma Fulu engaged in fierce fighting during the Battle of Peking (1900) at Zhengyangmen against the Eight-Nation Alliance. Ma Fulu and 100 of his fellow Hui and Dongxiang soldiers from his home village died in that battle. Indian soldiers used wood from the damaged tower as firewood that winter. The gate was reconstructed in the latter years of the Qing dynasty. Internal Affairs minister Zhu Qiqian ordered the barbican dismantled in 1915 to ease traffic congestion. The watchtower and gate tower were saved from demolition in 1965 on the orders of then premier Zhou Enlai.

==== Chongwenmen ====
Chongwenmen ('Gate of Respectful Civility'), commonly called "Hademen", was located on the eastern section of the Inner city southern wall. Originally called "Wenmingmen ('The Door of Civilization'), it was built in 1419. The name was changed during the Zhengtong era (1435–1449). The new name was taken from Zuo Zhuan: "崇文德也"('It is a virtue to respect civility'). The barbican, sluice gates, and a watchtower were built in the Zhengtong era.

The gate tower was built in multi-eaved Xieshanding style, with grey and green glazed tiles. In 1900 the gate tower was destroyed by artillery fire during the Siege of Peking; it was completely dismantled in 1920. The barbican was dismantled in 1950 and the gate tower in 1966.

Chongwenmen was a "sighting gate", with the connotation of "a bright and prosperous future". Its symbol was the Chongwen iron turtle. Due to its close proximity to the busy Tonghui river, it was the busiest gate in Beijing. Entry and departure taxes were charged at Chongwenmen throughout the Ming dynasty, Qing dynasty, and early Republican eras. The Empress Dowager Cixi's "cosmetic spending" and the early Republican China president's annual salary came directly from taxes levied at this gate. In 1924, Feng Yu xiang initiated a coup, after which the taxation at Chongwenmen was stopped.

Only Chongwenmen had bells announcing the closure of the gates at the end of the day. The other gates used a flat instrument that produced a "tang" sound. Thus arose the saying that of "nine gates, eight tangs, one old bell". This story is a possible etymological origin of zhongdian to refer to the hour in the Beijing dialect. In the past there were many distilleries in the southern Daxing District. Carts would carry newly brewed spirits through Chongwenmen. This is the origin of the saying, "Chongwenmen has carts carrying spirits entering; Xuanwumen has carts carrying prisoners leaving".

When Chongwenmen was dismantled during the Cultural Revolution, workers discovered that the gate was the original Ming structure, using phoebe puwennensis wood. Some of the recovered wood was used during reconstruction work in the Forbidden city and Tiananmen.

==== Xuanwumen ====
Xuanwumen ('Gate of Advocated Martiality') was located on western section of the southern wall. It was built in 1419 when Beijing's southern walls were expanded. Before the Zhengtong era (1435–1449) the gate was called Shunchengmen ('Shun Cheng Gate'), while commoners referred to it as Shunzhimen. The gate tower was completely rebuilt during the Zhengtong era, and a barbican, sluice gate tower, and watchtower were added. The name was changed to Xuanwu ("martial advocacy"), from a quotation from Zhang Heng's Dongjing Fu: "the martial integrity is to announce 武节是宣 wu jie shi xuan".

The watchtower was dismantled in 1927. The watchtower platform and the barbican were dismantled in 1930, and the gate tower was dismantled in 1965. The giant cannons on Xuanwumen were fired at noon.

Xuanwumen was informally referred to as the "Death Gate", because carts carrying prisoners for execution were taken through this gate to the execution ground, located in Caishikou, to the south. Beijing's many cemeteries were located in and around Taoranting in the southern suburbs. Funeral carts carrying commoners would often leave the city through Xuanwumen.

Of the nine Inner city gates of Beijing, Xuanwumen was built at the lowest elevation. Although normally the river system accommodated and directed water flow out of the city through Zhengyangmen's eastern sluice gates, these proved ineffective during heavy rainstorms, when most of the water would flood out of Xuanwumen. According to Guangxu Shuntianfu Zhi, heavy rainstorms in Beijing in 1695 flooded the gates at Xuanwumen, making them impossible to open. Six elephants were brought over from the zoo to force open the gates, and the flood finally dissipated out of the city.

==== Dongzhimen ====
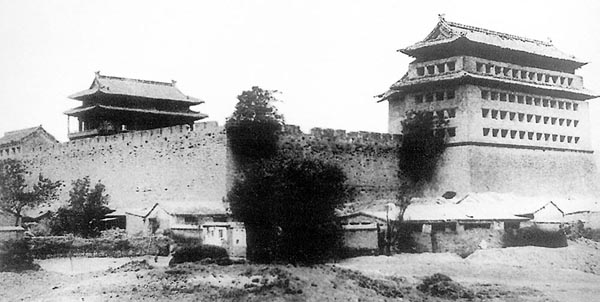
Dongzhimen in 1908

Dongzhimen (東直門 lit. 'Eastern Upright Gate') was located on the northern section of the Inner city eastern wall. It was built on the location of the Chongrenmen (崇仁門) gate of the Yuan era, the central gate of the eastern city wall of Dadu. In 1419 the name was changed, quoting "东方盛德属木、为春" and "直东方也，春也". Dongzhimen's gate tower was built in the multi-eaved Xieshanding style, with grey tiles with green glazed edges. The barbican was built during the final years of the Yuan dynasty (ended 1368). The temple had no proper statue of Guandi; a minor deity made of wood was located there instead. This gave rise to the old Beijing saying: "Nine gates, ten temples, one without morality". The sluice gate towers and the barbican were dismantled in 1915 when the circum-city railway was built. The watchtower was dismantled in 1930 and its platform in 1958. The gate tower was dismantled in 1965.

Outside Dongzhimen was a pagoda made completely from iron, with a stone statue of Yaowangye. Many carts carrying raw wood entered the city through Dongzhimen.

==== Chaoyangmen ====
Chaoyangmen (朝陽門 lit. 'Gate that Faces the Sun') was located at the midpoint of the Inner city eastern wall. Built at the site of the Dadu gate called Qihuamen (齊化門), it was informally known by that name by the commoners. The watchtower was destroyed by Japanese forces in 1900 and was rebuilt in 1903. The barbican was dismantled in 1915 when the circum-city railway was built. The gate tower and its platform were dismantled in 1953, and the watchtower in 1958.

Chaoyangmen was Beijing's "Food Gate", through which many carts carrying staple foods entered the city. The gate was closest to the Beijing-Hangzhou Grand Canal, and wheat and rice from the south China plains such arrived via that route. Much of the food was stored in warehouses just inside Chaoyangmen. Thus it has the symbol of a wheat grain engraved on the archway of the barbican gate. Chaoyangmen has the informal name of "Dumen", meaning 杜门 "resting station".

==== Xizhimen ====
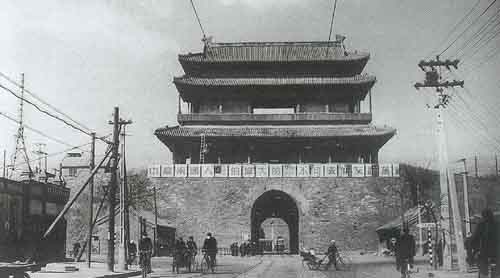
Xizhimen gate tower in 1953

Xizhimen (西直門 lit. 'Western Upright Gate') was located on the northern section of the Inner city western wall. Built on the site of the Yuan era gate called Heyimen (和義門), the name was changed in 1419 to reflect its location ("Xizhimen" means western axis gate). Its Guandi temple was dismantled in 1930. Heyimen's barbican was built during the reign of Yuan Shundi, in 1360. It was in continuous use for over 60 years during the Ming dynasty. During the Zhengtong era (1435–1449), at a time when the other Inner city gates were all undergoing complete reconstruction, it was covered over with bricks and was merged with the new watchtower platform.

Due to the poor water supply within Beijing, the Imperial family and wealthy families would get their water from springs on Mount Yuquan in the northwestern suburbs. Every morning, carts carrying spring water would enter the city through Xizhimen. Thus, a symbol of water was engraved on the barbican gate archway of Xizhimen.

Xizhimen, the last gate to remain fully intact, was completely dismantled in 1969. During demolition, workers discovered that parts of the barbican gate's archway were the originals from the 13th century.

==== Fuchengmen ====
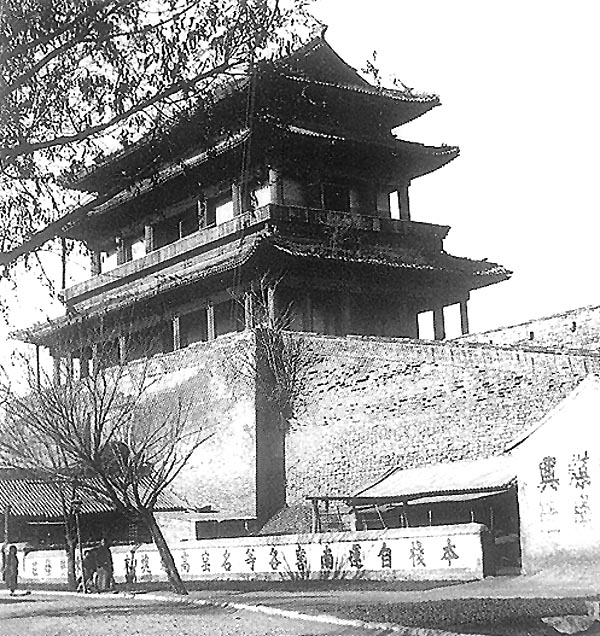
Fuchengmen in 1930

Fuchengmen (阜成門 lit. 'Gate of Abundant Success') was located at the midpoint of the Inner city western wall. Originally the site of the Pingzemen (平則門) gate of the Yuan era, it was still informally known as Pingzemen by the commoners even after its name was changed. The new name, "Fucheng", came from the classic Shàngshū, "六卿分职各率其属，以成九牧，阜成兆民". The gate was repaired in 1382 and completely rebuilt in 1435. The sluice gate tower and watchtower were dismantled in 1935. The barbican and watchtower platform were dismantled in 1953, and the gate tower in 1965.

Due to its proximity to the Western Hills and the coal reserves at Mentougou District, carts carrying coal would enter the city through Fuchengmen. The barbican gate archway had an engraving of a plum flower (plum flower "梅 Mei" and coal "煤 Mei" are homophones in Chinese. Also, the plum trees near Fuchengmen blossom in spring, around the time when coal was no longer needed and deliveries ceased). This gives rise to the old Beijing saying: "Fucheng's plum blossoms announce the arrival of the new spring's warmth". Fuchengmen is also informally referred to as "惊门 Jingmen", meaning "Justice".

==== Deshengmen ====
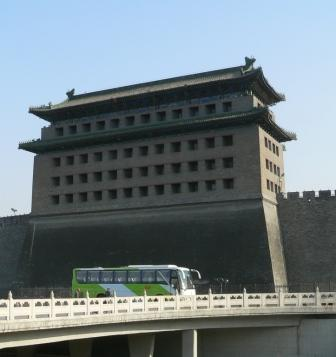
Deshengmen watch tower

Deshengmen (德勝門 lit. 'Gate of Moral Triumph') was located on the western section of the Inner city northern wall. Its name was changed from the original "Jiandemen (建德門)" during the early Ming dynasty. The new name implied that the Ming won the war against the Yuan Mongols by having strong ethics and morals. The northern wall was rebuilt in 1372 slightly to the south of the original position. The barbican was dismantled in 1915. In 1921 the gate tower was dismantled and in 1955 the gate tower platform was dismantled. A proposal was made in 1979 to dismantle the watchtower, but it was kept intact.

Seven of Beijing's Inner city gates had a Guandi temple built within their barbican grounds. Andingmen and Deshengmen had Zhenwu temples instead, as these gates were used by soldiers entering and leaving the city.

Both the Ming and the Qing, after defeating the Yuan and the Ming respectively, entered the city for the first time through Deshengmen; the name "Desheng" means "morally victorious". Carts carrying weapons used this gate for luck when entering or leaving the city. Deshengmen was also informally known as "修门 Xiumen", meaning "having high moral and ethical standards".

==== Andingmen ====
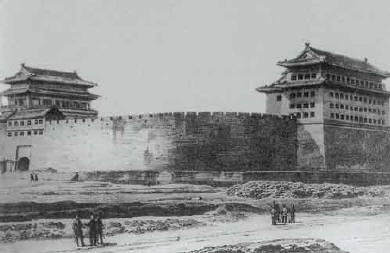
Andingmen in 1860

Andingmen (安定門 lit. 'Gate of Secured Peace') was located on the western side of the Inner city northern wall. It was built when the gate called Anzhenmen (安貞門) was moved south during the early Ming dynasty. It was renamed Andingmen, hoping for "peace and tranquility under the heavens (天下安定)". The barbican was dismantled in 1915 and the gate tower and watchtower in 1969.

Andingmen had a Zhenwu temples, as it was used by soldiers entering and leaving the city.

Andingmen was informally known as "生门 Shengmen", meaning "bountiful harvest". The Emperor always used this gate when leaving the city for the Temple of Earth, where he would pray for a bountiful harvest. Outside Andingmen were storage areas for feces, which was used for fertiliser. Carts carrying feces would leave via this gate for farms in the countryside.

During the dismantlement process, a small experiment to test the structural integrity of its gate tower was conducted. It was found that the gate tower structure could lean forward by 15 degrees and still not collapse.

==== Newly opened archways ====
Shuiguanmen was located near Zhengyangmen's eastern sluice gate. In 1905 the District Works Office of the Dongjiao Embassy District covered the original moat with concrete. They opened a new archway in place of the original sluice gate to create a new gate, which could be used as a means of swiftly retreating to the Zhengyangmen railroad station. Two iron gates were added. Each side of the archway had a hollowed-out room to serve as a guard station.

Hepingmen was located at the Inner city southern wall, between Zhengyangmen and Xuanwumen. It was opened in 1926 to ease traffic congestion. The gate had no defensive structures, but was simply a passageway in and out of the city. Originally named "Xinhuamen", the name was changed to "Hepingmen" in 1927 to distinguish it from the famous Xinhuamen, the entrance to Zhongnanhai, a complex of central governmental offices. The archways were 13 metres high and 10 metres wide, with two iron gates. The top of the archway was removed in 1958 and the gate became a simple opening in the wall.

Jianguomen was located at the southern edge of the eastern wall of the Inner city. It was at the northeast region of the Beijing Ancient Observatory. The gate was dismantled in 1939 and an opening 7.9 metres wide was created in its place. It was in the shape of an inverted "八" character. Although it was merely an opening in the wall and not an actual gate, it was given the name of a gate – "Qimingmen". The name was changed to "Jianguomen" in 1945. In 1957 it was torn down, along with the surrounding Inner city walls.

Fuxingmen was located at the southern edge of the western wall of the Inner city, at the same latitude as Jianguomen on the eastern wall. The gate was dismantled in 1939 and an opening 7.4 metres wide created in its place. It was in the shape of an inverted "八" character, similar to Jianguomen. It too was given the name of a gate – "Chang'anmen". The name was changed to "Fuxingmen" in 1945 when a 12.6-metre-high platform was built and a single-arch passageway 10 metres wide was added. The complete structure was dismantled in 1955.

=== Inner city corner guard towers ===
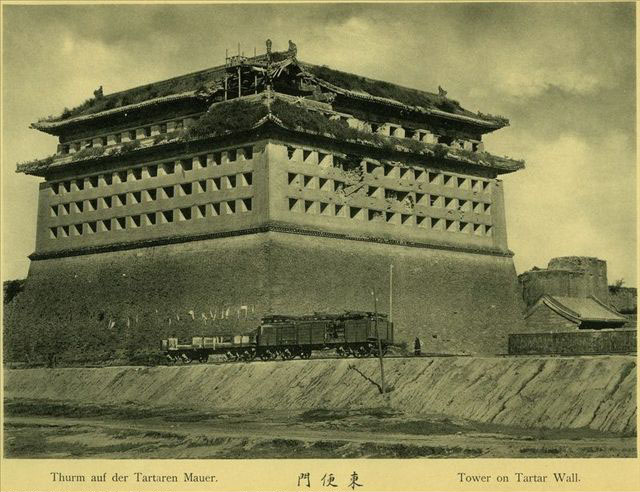
Southeast corner guard tower of the Inner City in the early 20th century

Guard towers were located at the four corners of the Inner city walls. They were all similarly designed in the multi-eaved Xieshanding style, with grey tiles with green glazed edges. The towers had a height of 17 metres, and a total height of 29 metres, including the platform. The two adjacent sides facing away from the city were 35 metres wide. The towers were four storeys high and were fitted with 14 arrow slits on each floor. The two adjacent sides facing into the city had four arrow slits on each floor. The sides facing the city also had true windows that could be opened for ventilation and light, while the arrow slits were only opened when shooting arrows or cannonballs. The interior of the towers were hollow; platforms and stairs ringed the walls to allow access to the arrow slits.

Only the southeastern corner guard tower has survived. To avoid disrupting rail service at the nearby main train station while the subway was being built, the subway was routed away from the city walls and the southeastern corner guard tower. Thus the tower survived, along with a section of the Inner city wall. The northeastern tower was dismantled in 1920 and its platform in 1953. The northwestern tower was destroyed by Russian cannon fire in 1900 during the Boxer Rebellion. Its platform was dismantled in 1969. The southwestern corner guard tower was dismantled in 1930 because of a lack of funds for maintenance. Its platform was dismantled in 1969.

== Outer city ==
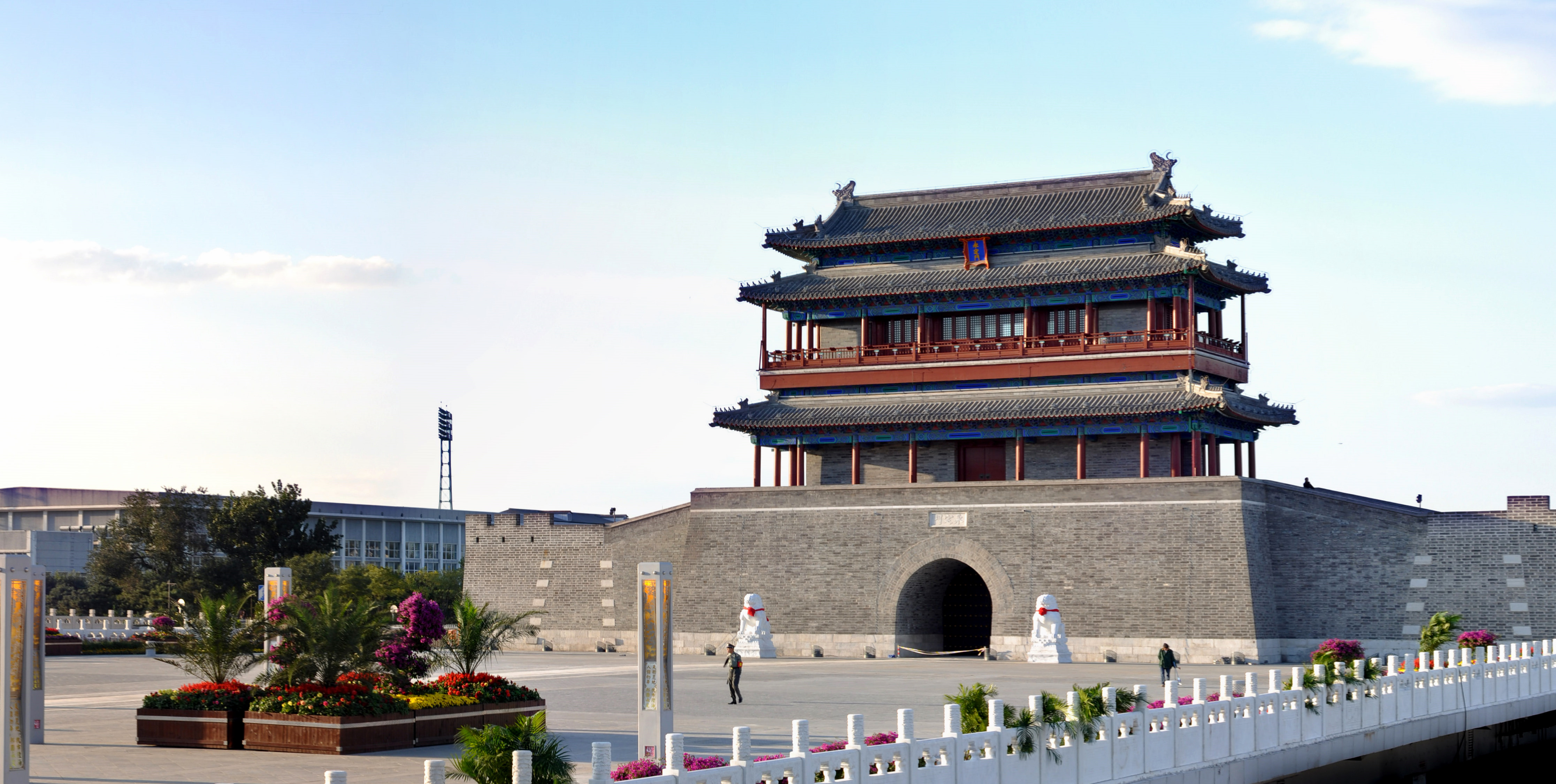
The reconstructed Yongdingmen gate tower

The Outer city was also called "Guocheng" or "Waiguo". It was expanded in 1553. The walls were 7.5 to 8 metres high, and were 12 metres wide at the bottom and 9 metres wide at the top. The southeastern corner was built on the diagonal to avoid low swamps in the area. This fulfilled the legend of Nüwa mending the heavens: the heavens were missing in the northwest and the earth was sinking in the southeast.

The southern walls encompassed the southern walls of the Temple of Heaven, and the eastern and western walls were parallel with the Inner city's walls, about 2 kilometres away. This was where the rammed earth walls of the Yuan city of Dadu had been located before being abandoned in the closing years of the Hongwu era (1368–1398) during the early Ming dynasty. Walls in the northeastern and northwestern sections were built using materials recovered from the Yuan rammed earth structure. The Outer city walls had a perimeter of approximately 28 kilometres. The entire enclosure of the inner and outer cities formed a "凸" shape with a perimeter of 60 kilometres. Eleven gates were built, three each on the eastern, southern, and western walls, and two on the northern walls (one on the northeastern section and one on the northwestern section).

When the expansion of the Outer city was being planned in 1550, one idea called for nine small minor cities to be built around the nine Inner city gates, which would have been a formidable addition to the city defenses. Construction began in 1550 on three of these minor cities. However, because of the proximity to the Inner city gates, where many commoner's houses and shops had sprung up, many buildings needed to be dismantled. The disgruntled commoners forced the abandonment of the project not long after construction began. In 1553, it was decided that the remaining rammed earth walls of the Yuan city of Dadu would be dismantled and the raw materials used to complete the Outer city walls to form a "回": a square within a square. The plan called for the Outer city walls to have a perimeter of 70 kilometres. The east and west walls would have been 17 kilometres and the north and south 18 kilometres. The plan called for 11 more gates, 176 more enemy sight towers, two additional sluice gates outside of Xizhimen and Tonghui River, and eight more sluice gates at other low swampy areas. The Outer city expansion was a grand project, greater than any of the capitals of the previous Chinese dynasties. The Emperor approved, and construction began in 1554. Under the supervision of Yan Song, the project was divided into segments. The southern walls were built first to add extra defenses for the bustling commercial district south of the Inner city gate at Zhengyangmen. The eastern and western walls were planned for the second segment of the project. However, due to successive invasions from the Mongols and Manchus, soldiers were called away to the northern frontiers to defend the Great Wall, and thus few could be spared for construction. A great section of the Forbidden city caught fire in 1557, and workers and funding were funnelled towards repairs and reconstruction of the palaces. The expansion of the Outer city walls was thus never completed. In 1564, the barbicans of the Outer city gates were built.

Most of the Outer City walls and all of its gates except Guangqumen were intact in 1949. However, over 80% were dismantled in the following decade as the city expanded. In 1958, vice-mayor Wang Kunlun of Beijing suggested that the Outer City walls "have no historical or cultural value worth preserving" and recommended their complete removal. The same year, the last two remaining Outer City gates, Yongdingmen and Dongbianmen, were demolished. By 1959, the walls had by and large disappeared.

=== Outer city walls ===
The Outer city walls had four corner guard towers and seven gate towers. The outside of the wall was covered with blocks averaging a metre in width. Most of the larger blocks were installed during the Ming dynasty and the smaller ones during the Qing dynasty. The blocks on the interior surface averaged 0.7 metres. The Outer city walls had an average height of 6 to 7 metres. The wall was 10 to 11 metres wide at the top and 11 to 15 metres wide at the base. The western sections were the narrowest, averaging only 4.5 metres at the top and 7.8 metres at the base.

=== Outer city gates ===
Beijing's Outer city wall had seven gates, three on the southern walls, one each on the eastern and western walls, and two side gates on the northern walls (on the northeastern and northwestern sections). The Outer city gate towers were all smaller in scale than those of the Inner city. The largest was the central southern gate: Yongdingmen. This gate was aligned on the same north–south axis as Zhengyangmen of the Inner city, Tiananmen of the Imperial city, and Wumen of the Forbidden city. The gate tower at Yongdingmen was approximately 20 metres in height, in the multi-eaved Xieshanding style, and was seven rooms by three rooms. Just below Yongdingmen in size was the slightly smaller Guangningmen (present-day Guang'anmen). The gate towers at Guangqumen, Zuo'anmen, and You'anmen were all single-eaved Xieshanding style with one floor, and were only 15 metres tall. The two side gates, Dongbianmen and Xibianmen, were even smaller.

The barbicans of the Outer city gates were not built until the Ming dynasty. The watchtowers were built during the Qianlong era of the Qing dynasty (1735–1796). The watchtowers of the Outer city wall were smaller than those of the Inner city. The watchtower at Yongdingmen was the largest on the Outer city wall; it had two rows of arrow slits with seven slits in each row on the front and two rows of three on each side. Unlike in the Inner city, the watchtowers had no side tower on the interior aspect; there was only an archway. The watchtowers at Guang'anmen, Guangqumen, Zuo'anmen, and You'anmen each had 22 arrow slits. Dongbianmen and Xibianmen had the smallest watchtowers, with only eight arrow slits. Unlike the Inner city wall, the barbicans on the outer wall were all built around the base of the watchtowers instead of the base of the gate towers, thus forming a straight line with the gate's archway. Guandi temples were not built in the barbicans of the Outer city gates.

Gate	English Translation	Alternate Names	Gate Tower	Watchtower	Barbican
Yongdingmen	Gate of Eternal Stability		Two floors; Each floor had 5 rooms by 3 rooms and was 24 meters by 10.5 meters; 26 meters high	3 rooms by 1 room; 12.8 meters by 6.7 meters; Two levels of arrow slits, with 7 on each level on the southern face and 3 on each level on the eastern and western sides; Single archway directly under watchtower platform	Rectangular barbican measuring 42 meters from east to west and 36 meters from north to south; Corners of barbican were curved
Zuo'anmen	Left Gate of Peace	Jiangcamen	Single level; Three rooms by one room, 16 meters by 9 meters; Gate tower 6.5 meters tall, on top of a 15 meter high platform	Single level; Three rooms by one room; 13 meters by 6 meters; 7.1 meters high; Same arrangement of arrow slits and barbican as Yongdingmen	Same as Yongdingmen
You'anmen	Right Gate of Peace	Fengyimen or Xinanmen (southwestern gate)	Same as Zuo'anmen	Same as Zuo'anmen	Same as Zuo'anmen
Guangqumen	Gate of Extended Waterway	Shawomen	Same as Zuo'anmen	Same as Zuo'anmen	Same as Zuo'anmen
Guang'anmen	Gate of Extended Peace	Guangningmen or Zhangyimen	Two stories; Three rooms by one room; 26 meters high, 13.8 meters by 6 meters		Originally semicircular; Expanded in 1766 to rectangular with curved corners, and measured 39 meters by 34 meters
Dongbianmen	Eastern Convenient Gate		11.2 meters by 5.5 meters, 12.2 meters high; No archway, instead had smaller wooden side gate	2 levels of arrow slits, 4 per level on the northern side and 2 per level on the eastern and western sides	
Xibianmen	Western Convenient Gate		10.5 meters high; Otherwise similar to Dongbianmen	Similar to Dongbianmen	

==== Yongdingmen ====
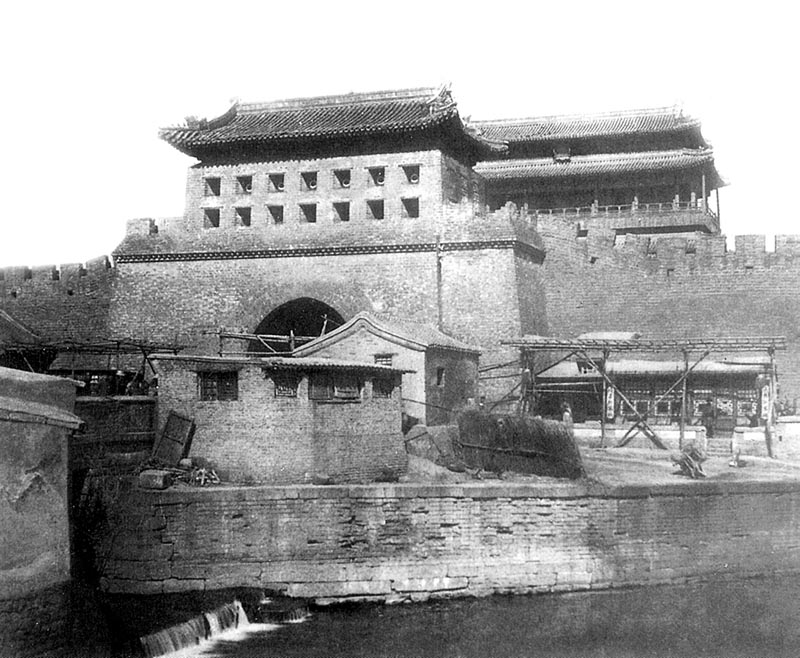
Yongdingmen in 1920s (photo by Osvald Sirén).

Yongdingmen (永定門 lit. 'Gate of Eternal Stability') was located on the midsection of the southern wall. It was built in 1766, imitating the multi-eaved Xieshanding style of the Inner city gates, roofed with grey tiles with glazed green rims. The watchtower was in the single-eaved Xieshanding style with grey roof tiles. During the Boxer Rebellion, on 11 June, the secretary of the Japanese legation, Sugiyama Akira (杉山 彬), was attacked and killed by the Muslim soldiers of General Dong Fuxiang near Yongdingmen, who were guarding the southern part of the Beijing walled city. The barbican was dismantled in 1950, and the gate tower and watchtower were dismantled in 1957. In 2004, the gate tower was reconstructed slightly north of its original location.

==== Zuo'anmen ====
Zuo'anmen (左安門 lit. 'Left Gate of Peace') was located on the eastern section of the southern wall. The gate tower and watchtower were built in the single-eaved Xieshanding style with grey roof tiles. The gate tower and watchtower were dismantled in the 1930s, and the gate tower platform, watchtower platform, and barbican were dismantled in 1953.

Zuo'anmen was commonly referred to as "Jiangcamen". "江擦 （jiāng cā）" and "礓磋 （jiāng cuō）" sound different but have the same meaning. In traditional Chinese architecture, "礓磋（jiāng cuō）", also called "礓礤 (jiāng cǎ)", are stone steps without ladder-like step platforms.

==== You'anmen ====
You'anmen (右安門 lit. 'Right Gate of Peace') was located on the western section of the southern wall. It was commonly known as "Fengyimen" or "Xinanmen" ("southwestern gate"), because Fengyimen of the Jin dynasty city of Zhongdu had been located nearby. All of its specifications were the same as Zuo'anmen. The barbican and watchtower were dismantled in 1956, and the gate tower in 1958.

==== Guangqumen ====
Guangqumen (廣渠門 lit. 'Gate of Extended Waterway') was located slightly north of the midsection of the eastern wall. Its common name was "Shawomen (沙窝門)". It had the same specifications as Zuo'anmen. The watchtower was dismantled in the 1930s, and the barbican and gate tower were dismantled in 1953.

Ming general Yuan Chonghuan defeated the Manchu Later Jin forces at this gate in 1629, in the final years of the Ming dynasty. In 1900, when the Eight Nation alliance forces reached Beijing, they initially did not attack this gate, so troops stationed there were relocated to help defend the other Outer city gates. British troops took the opportunity to capture the gate. They then bombarded the inner city gate of Chongwenmen from the Temple of Heaven and entered the inner city.

==== Guang'anmen ====
Guang'anmen (廣安門 lit. 'Gate of Extended Peace') was located slightly north of the midsection of the western wall. It was called "Guangningmen (廣宁門)" during the Ming dynasty, and was also called "Zhangyimen", because it was on the same axis as Zhangyimen of the city of Zhongdu of the Jin dynasty. The name was changed from "Guangningmen" to "Guang'anmen" during the Qing dynasty, in order to avoid criticism of the Qing Emperor Xuan, who was named Minning (旻宁). Its original specifications were the same as Guangqumen. Because it was heavily used by new arrivals entering the city from the southern Chinese provinces, the Qianlong Emperor decided to make the gate more impressive and majestic. Guang'anmen was expanded in 1766 in a style that imitated Yongdingmen and the Inner city gates. The gate tower was a two-storey multi-eaved Xieshanding style building with grey roof tiles with glazed green rims. The barbican was originally semi-circular. After the expansion of 1766, it was rectangular with curved corners. The barbican and watchtower were dismantled in the 1940s, and the gate tower in 1957.

==== Dongbianmen ====
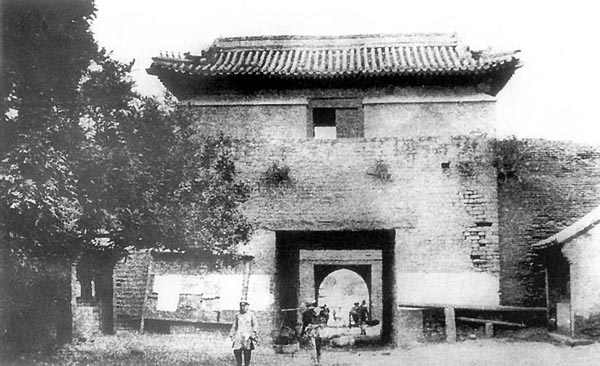
Dongbianmen in 1921

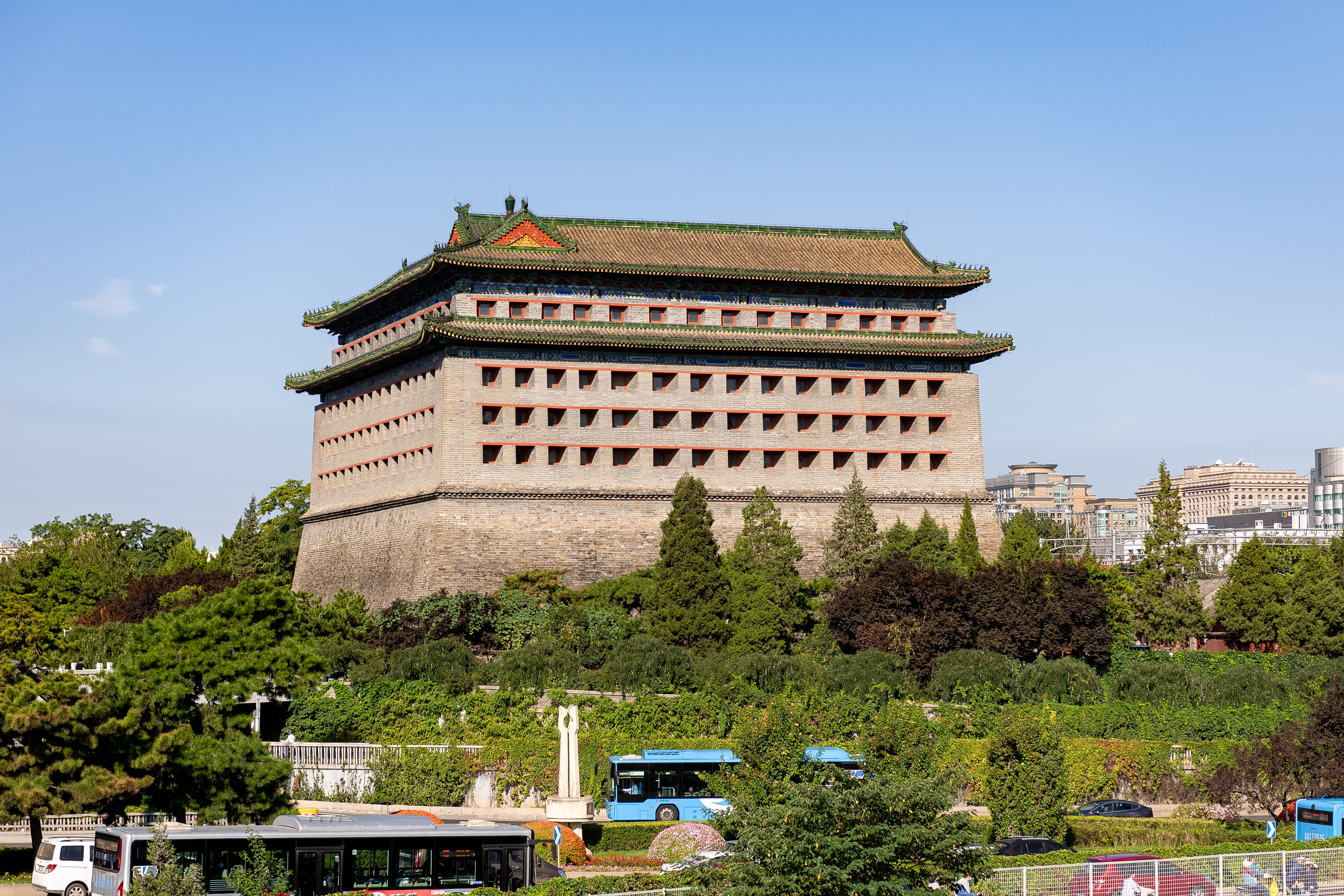
Dongbianmen stood next to the Southeast corner guard tower of the Inner City

Dongbianmen (東便門 lit. 'Eastern Convenient Gate') was located at the northeastern corner of the Outer city walls at the point where the outer wall stopped short and turned toward the Inner city wall. A matching gate was built on the northwestern corner of the Outer city walls. The gates, originally intended to be temporary, were at first not given names. About ten years after completion, the gates were named Dongbianmen ("eastern side gate") and Xibianmen ("western side gate"). The gate tower at Dongbianmen was similar to the one at Zuo'anmen, but on a slightly smaller scale. The gate had no archway; instead it had a smaller wooden side gate on one side. The watchtower was built during the Qianlong era (1735–1796). Both of the barbican and watchtower had been dismantled in the 1930s due to lack of funds for maintenance. The gate tower was dismantled in 1958 when Beijing's main train station was built.

==== Xibianmen ====
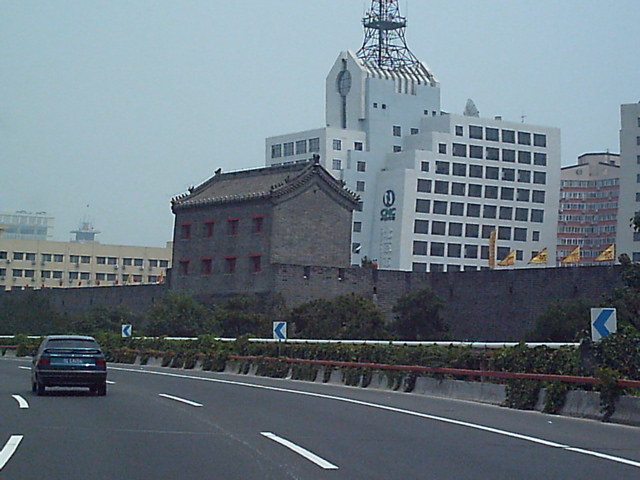
Remaining walls of the Xibianmen barbican

Xibianmen (西便門 lit. 'Western Convenient Gate') was located at the northwestern corner of the Outer city walls. It was dismantled in 1952. Parts of the barbican walls remain.

=== Corner guard towers ===
Four corner guard towers were built at the four vertices of the Outer city walls in 1554. They were all single-storey buildings in the single-eaved Xieshanding cross (square-shaped) style. Approximately 7.5 metres high, they contained one room measuring 6 metres by 6 metres. There were two levels of arrow slits, with three on each level on the two sides facing out of the city, and two on each level on the two sides facing towards the city. The southwestern and northeastern corner guard towers were dismantled in the 1930s, and the southeastern and northwestern corner guard towers were dismantled in 1955 and 1957 respectively.

== Imperial city ==
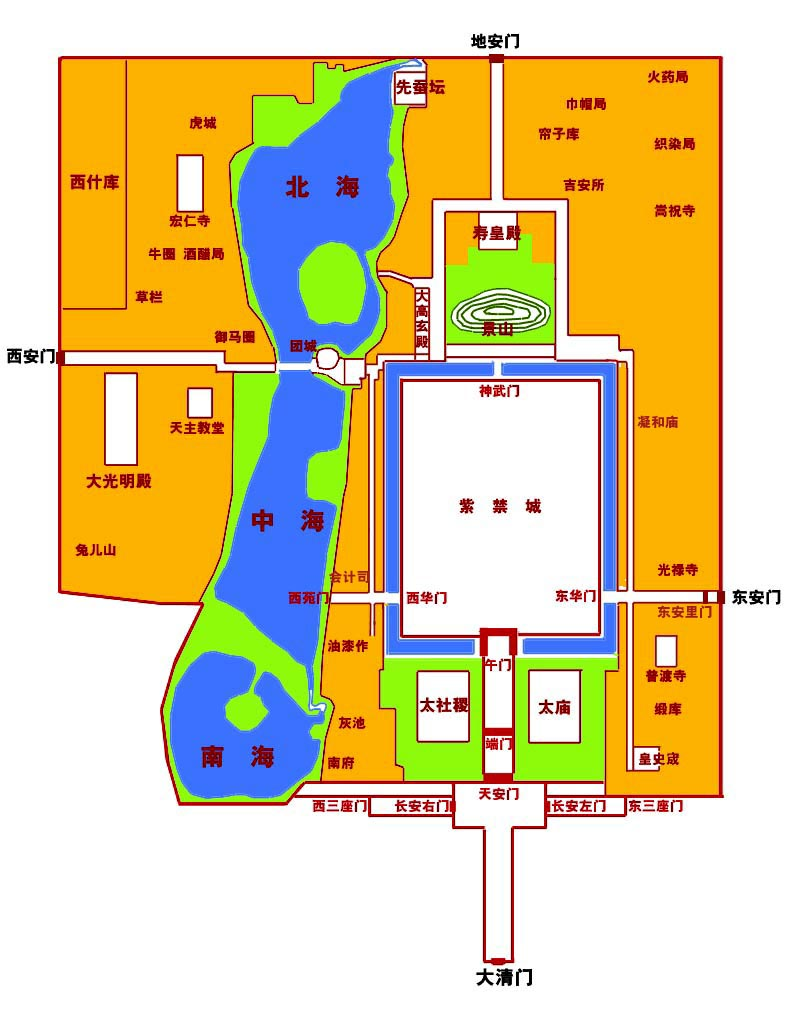
Imperial city, Beijing

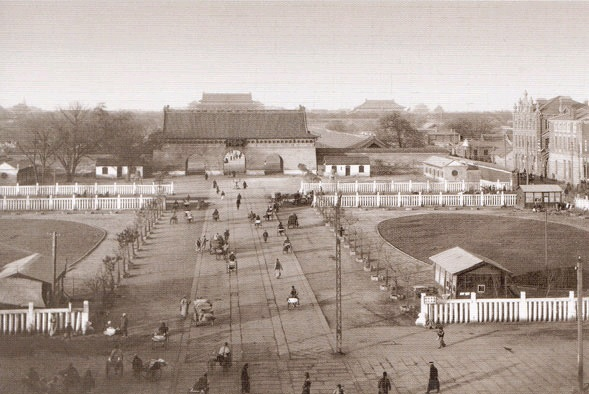
Gate of China (Zhonghuamen), viewed from the south. This is now the location of the Mausoleum of Mao Zedong on Tiananmen Square.

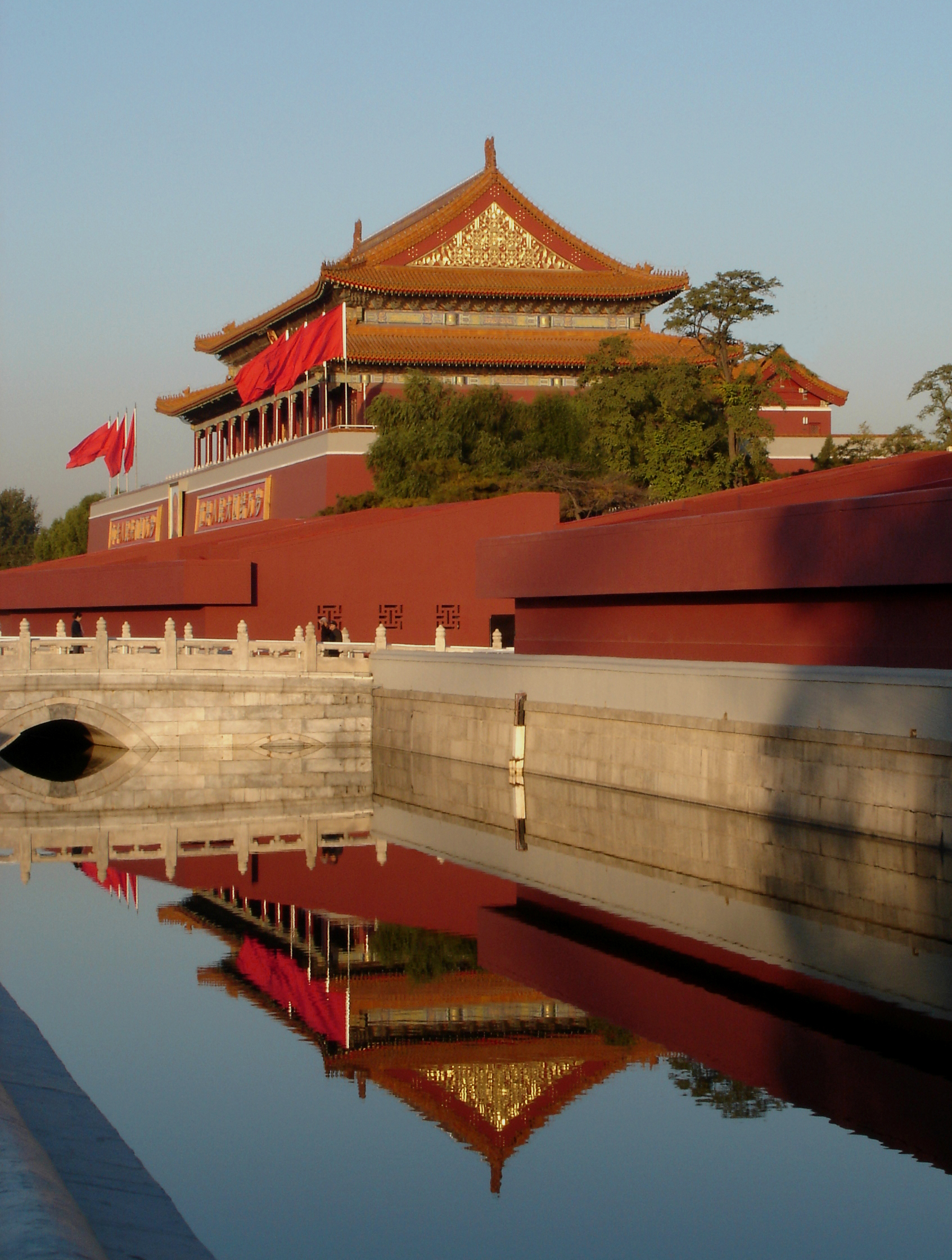
Tiananmen

Beijing's Imperial city was built during the Yongle era (1402–1424). It was expanded northwards, eastwards, and southwards from the foundations the Imperial city of Dadu of the Yuan dynasty as an expansion of the Forbidden city, which was solely for the use of the imperial family. It was rectangular in shape, except in the southwestern corner, which was the location of Qingshou Temple. The walls averaged 7 to 8 metres in height, and were 2 metres thick at the base and 1.7 metres at the top. It was painted red on the exterior, with glazed imperial yellow tiles at the top. It had a perimeter of 10.6 kilometres (north: 2,506 metres, south: 1,701 metres, east: 2,756 metres, west: 3,724 metres). There were seven gates (some sources count four, six, or eight gates), of which Tiananmen, Di'anmen, Dong'anmen, and Xi'anmen are the four referred to by the saying "Inner city nine gates, Outer city seven gates, Imperial city four gates (内九外七皇城四)".

The main central southern gate of the Imperial city was Damingmen. It was made of bricks, in imitation of the Forbidden city gates. Its base was of white marble in the Xumi foundation style. The gate tower was in the single-eaved Xieshanding style with glazed imperial yellow roof tiles. It had five pillars on the front, three archways at the centre, and white marble railings. Its name was changed to Daqingmen (大清門 "Great Qing Gate") in 1644, when the Manchu first entered Beijing, establishing the Qing dynasty. A white marble tablet on the gate had the name "Daqingmen" engraved in gold on an azure background. In 1912, when the Qing dynasty was overthrown and the Republic of China was established, the gate's name was changed to Zhonghuamen (中華門 "Gate of China"). The city planners decided to reuse the tablet and simply write the words "Zhonghuamen" on the reverse of the tablet. However, when it was taken down and flipped over, they discovered the words Damingmen (大明門 "Great Ming Gate") already appeared on the back of the tablet; it had already been re-used. A new tablet made of wood was created instead. In 1954, with the recommendation of Soviet city planners then working in Beijing, the gate was dismantled for the future Tiananmen Square. Its location is now the site of the Mausoleum of Mao Zedong.

Located southwest of Tiananmen, Chang'anzuomen is similar to Damingmen. It was also called "Qinglongmen" or "Longmen", meaning "Dragon Gate", because during the Ming and Qing dynasties, results of the imperial examinations were posted on this gate. Successfully passing the examinations allowed a person to enter the Forbidden city to work in imperial bureaucratic positions, normally forbidden to commoners. It was dismantled in 1952 when the Chang'an Avenue was expanded.

Located southeast of Tiananmen, Chang'anyoumen was similar to Damingmen. It was also called "Baihumen" or "Humen", meaning "Tiger Gate", because during the Ming and Qing dynasties, prisoners were executed just west of this gate. It was dismantled in 1952 when the Chang'an Avenue was expanded.

Tiananmen ("Gate of Heavenly Peace"), originally called Chengtianzhimen, was renamed during the Qing dynasty. It was located at the midpoint of the southern wall of the Imperial city. The Daming Huidian (the collected statutes of the Ming dynasty) refer to it as the main gate of the Imperial city. Tiananmen is one of several gates that lined up on a north–south axis at the main entrance to the Forbidden city. Its platform is 13 metres high. It has a white marble base of Xumi style and five archways. The gate tower was built in multi-eaved Xieshanding style with glazed imperial yellow roof tiles. It is nine rooms by five rooms (originally five rooms by three rooms during the early Ming dynasty) and 33.7 metres high. It was completely reconstructed in 1958 and subsequently repaired on several occasions.

Duanmen was located directly north of Tiananmen. It was similar to Tiananmen. It can be seen as an outer gate of Wumen, which was the main entrance to the Forbidden City. This conforms to the Rites of Zhou's five gate rule's "Zhimen" or "Kumen".

Dong'anmen was located slightly south of the midpoint of the Imperial city's eastern wall. Single-eaved Xieshanding style with glazed imperial yellow roof tiles, it was seven rooms by three rooms, and had three archways, each fitted with a pair of red-painted golden-nailed doors. It was destroyed by fire in 1912 during Cao Kun's insurrection against Zhang Xun. In 2001 the site was cleared to become the Beijing Imperial City Site Park.

Xi'anmen was located slightly north of the midpoint of the Imperial city's western wall. It was similar to Dong'anmen. It was accidentally burnt down on 1 December 1950. A smaller version of the gate tower was built on its original site, using the same materials of the original gate tower, as a commemoration.

Beianmen was located at the central axis of the Imperial city's northern wall. The north gate of the Imperial city, it was commonly referred to as "Houzaimen" during the Ming dynasty. It was renamed "Di'anmen" during the Qing dynasty. It was similar to Dong'anmen, but slightly bigger in scale. It was dismantled between 1954 and 1956.

== Forbidden city ==
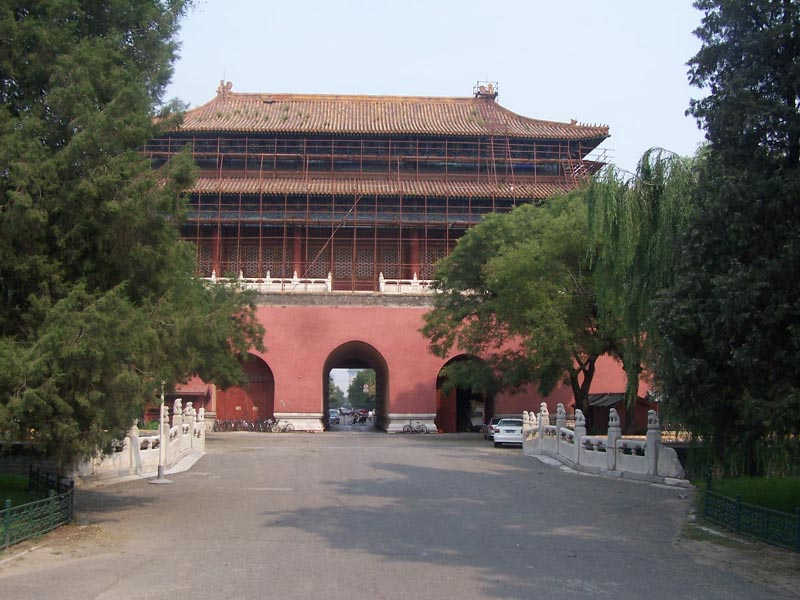
Donghuamen gate

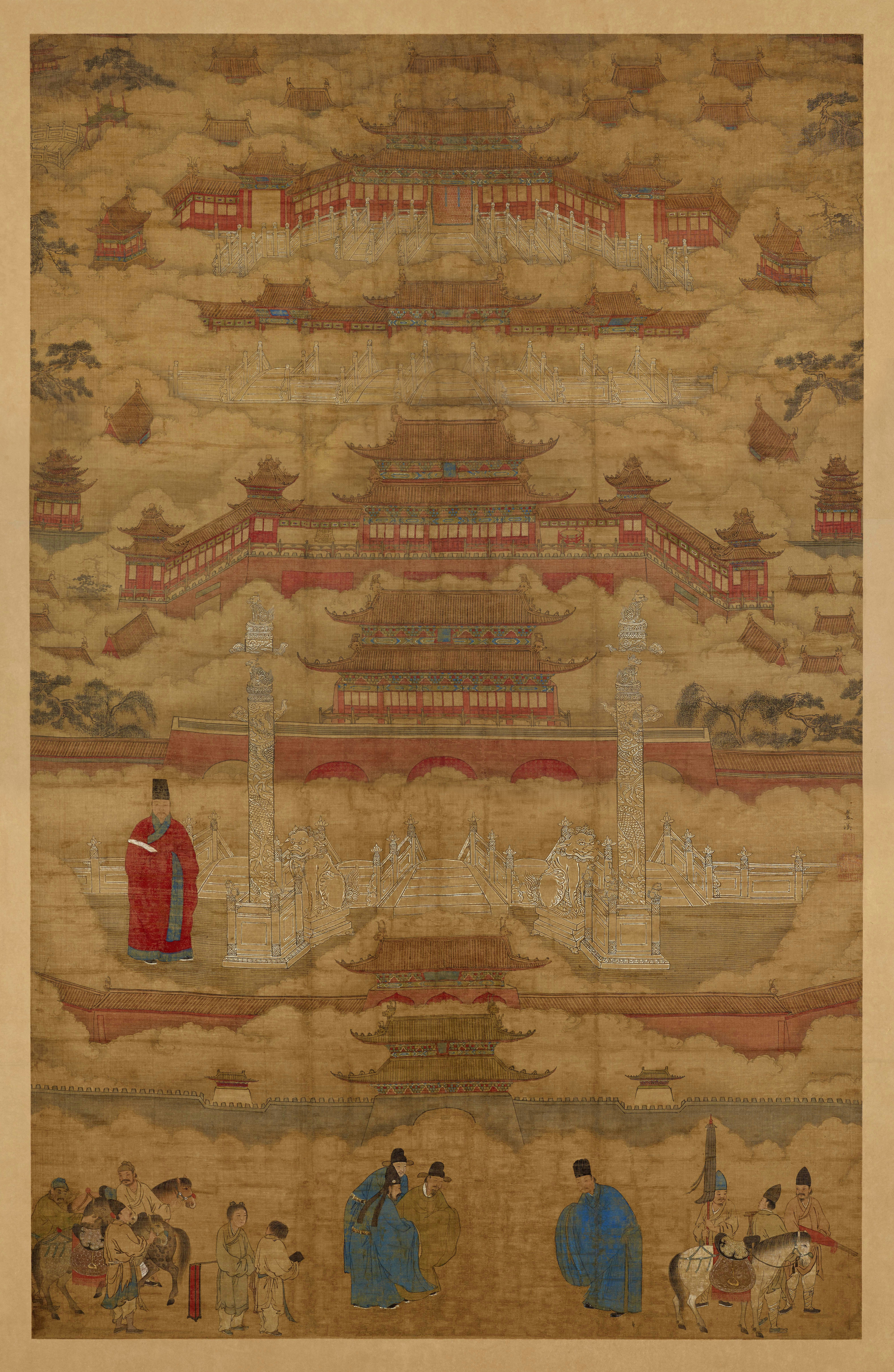
The Forbidden City as depicted in a Ming dynasty painting

Beijing's Palace city or "Forbidden city" (so-called because the majority of the populace was forbidden to enter) was completed in 1415. Its surrounding walls had a perimeter of 3.4 kilometres, a height of 10 metres, a thickness of 8.62 metres at the base, and a top thickness of 6.66 metres. The wall had two rows of roof tiles glazed in the imperial yellow colour set on a triangular base 0.84 metres tall. The interior and exterior sides of the walls were reinforced with 2-metre-thick bricks surrounding stones and rammed earth. The Forbidden city had four corner guard towers built in a combination multi-eaved Xieshanding style. There were four gates.

Wumen (午门 lit. 'Meridian Gate') was the southern-facing main gate. It was in alignment with the city's central axis and with three other gates: Yongdingmen of the Outer city, Zhengyangmen of the Inner city, and Tiananmen of the Imperial city. It was built on a "凹 (“concave")" shaped platform 13.5 metres high. The gate tower was nine rooms by five rooms in the multi-eaved veranda floored design. It had two side pavilion towers on each side, square in shape, each five rooms by five rooms. The two wings stretching from the centre are commonly referred to as "hawk wings towers". Each of these wings is 13 rooms by two rooms with a square pavilion tower at the end of the wing. The wings each have a minor gate near the intersection with the main "body" of the platform. At the left and right of the platform are sundials and many other time measurement instruments. The gates are rectangular in shape, unlike the archways seen in the Outer city, Inner city, and Imperial city gates. There are three archways in the middle of the gate.

Xuánwumen (玄武门) (not to be confused with Xuanwumen (宣武门) of the Inner city gates), also called Shenwumen (神武门), was the northern entrance to the Forbidden city. Its gate tower was five rooms by three rooms in a multi-eaved veranda floored design. It has three rectangular gates. During the Ming and Qing dynasties, there was a gate called Beishangmen just outside this gate, but it was dismantled in 1950.

Donghuamen (东华门) was the eastern entrance to the Forbidden city, with a design similar to that of Xuánwumen and Xihuamen. Xihuamen was the western entrance to the Forbidden city, with a similar design to Xuánwumen and Donghuamen.

The Qing Huidian records that there were six gates to the Forbidden city. This takes into account the two minor side gates of Wumen's two "arms".

== Moats, canals, and other watershed systems ==
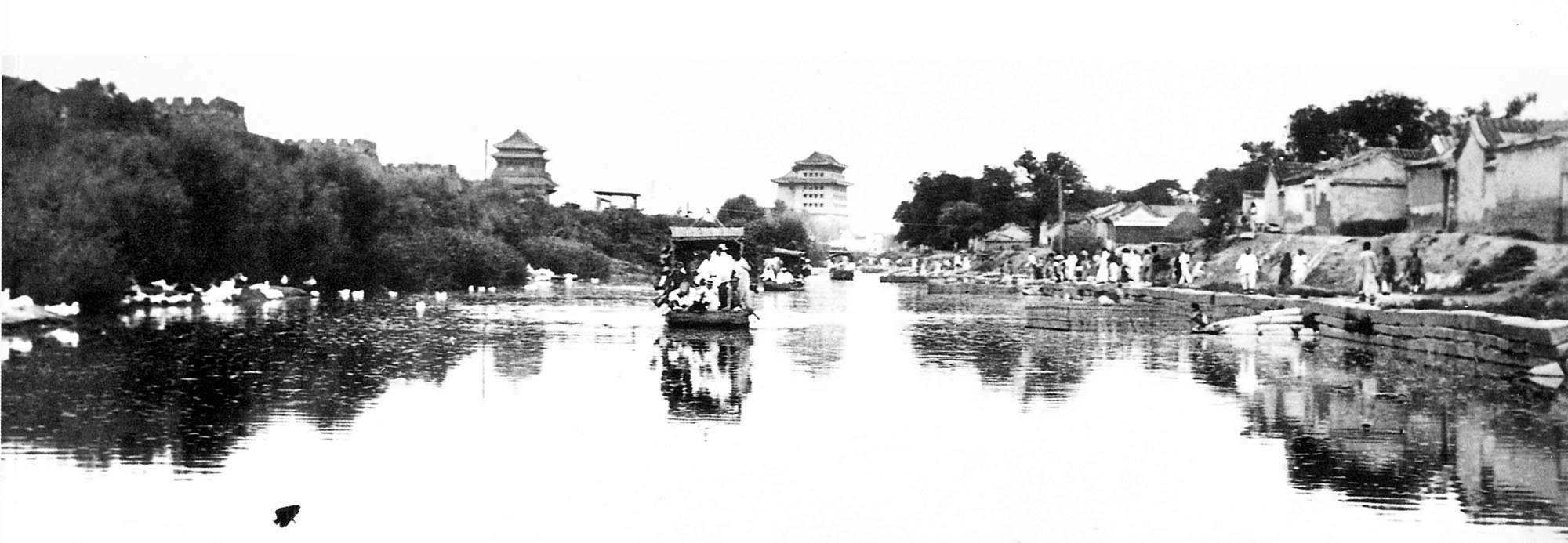
The southern section of the Inner city moat. Zhengyangmen's gate tower and watchtower can be seen in the distance.

The city of Dadu of the Yuan dynasty had an extensive moat system in and around the city. After Ming troops entered Dadu in 1368, the northern wall was rebuilt slightly south of the original. The new wall was constructed on the piled earthen hill formed from digging the moat of Dadu. A new moat system was built for the three main southern gates of the palace, Imperial, and Inner city quarters. The three moats were then linked to the eastern and western moats of Dadu. When the Outer city was reconstructed during the Jiajing era (1521–1567), another moat was built surrounding the outer wall.

The water for the moats was spring water diverted from Mount Yuquan and Baifuquan, northwest of the city. The water followed Changhe and then split into two tributaries at Xizhimen. One route went east, forming the Inner city's moat system, and then divided into two further tributaries at Deshengmen, one flowing south, the other east. The other route entered at Jishuitan in the south, formed the three lakes of the imperial gardens, and finally rejoined the moat system at Tongzihe. From there the water flowed along the curvature of the city wall and joined the city's southern moat system at Zhengyangmen. The eastern route turned 90 degrees south at the northeastern corner guard tower and converged with the city's southern moat system to the northwest of Dongbianmen. Another moat flowed westwards and then southwards, forming the Outer city's moat system. It converged with the Inner city's southern and eastern moat systems at Dongbianmen, and finally entered the Tonghui River.

The Inner city's moat system was widest, at 30 to 50 metres, to the southeast of Zhengyangmen. The narrowest point, a mere 10 metres in width, was the section between Dongzhimen and Chaoyangmen. The moat was three metres deep at its deepest point, and a metre deep at its most shallow, near Fuchengmen. The outer moat was narrower and shallower than that of the Inner city. By the end of the Qing dynasty, the artificial moat system behaved no differently from a natural river system.

Water passageways located at several locations along Beijing's city walls helped permit the flow of the water supply into and out of the city. There were seven passageways in the Inner city: Deshengmen West (entered the Inner city, three passages), Dongzhimen South (left the city, one passage), Chaoyangmen South (left the city, one passage), Chongwenmen East (left the city, one passage), Zhengyangmen East (left the city, one passage), Zhengyangmen West (left the city, three passages), and Xuanwumen West (left the city, one passage). There were three passageways in the Outer city: Xibianmen East (entered the Outer city, three passages), Dongbianmen West (entered the Outer city, three passages), and Dongbianmen East (the main drainage for the inner and outer cities, three passages). The passageways had rammed earth foundations covered with stone slabs and stone bricks, followed by a layer of bricks. Each passageway had two or three layers of iron railings, and plenty of soldiers on guard.

The moat system influenced the daily activities of Beijing's commoners. From the Yongle era (1402–1424) until the mid-Qing dynasty (1644–1912), the eastern sections of the southern moat system were used as canals for the transportation of staple foods entering the city. Commoners could board boats at the eastern moat system, travel southwards to leave the city at Dongbianmen, and go down the Tonghui River, which leads to the rural areas of Tongzhou. Every year during the Hungry Ghost Festival, people would place small ships containing candles on the water. When frozen in winter, the moats were used as shortcuts in and out of the city. There would be skating, and the ice would be cut and saved underground for use in the summer months. The moats were home to many fish and ducks.

In 1953, Beijing's moat system was measured at 41.19 kilometres. As the city continued to expand, the moat system was no longer used, and much of it was channeled underground. The moat systems of the three main southern gates became underground rivers during the 1960s. The western, eastern, and northern moat systems were covered in the 1970s. A few remnants remain of the Inner city's northern moat system, the Outer city's southern moat system, and the imperial and Forbidden city's systems.

Many of Beijing's lakes were filled in during the mid-1960s to the mid-1970s (for example, Taiping Lake), totalling a land area of 33.4 hectares. Many others, such as Longxugou and Lianhuachi, were decreased in size by being partially filled in. The government also cleaned up many lakes outside of the city, making some into larger lakes. Public parks were created at Taoranting Park, Longtan Lake, Yuyuantan, and Zizhuyuan. Some new river systems were built during the 1950s (Kunyu River and Jingmi Diversion River).

== Influences ==
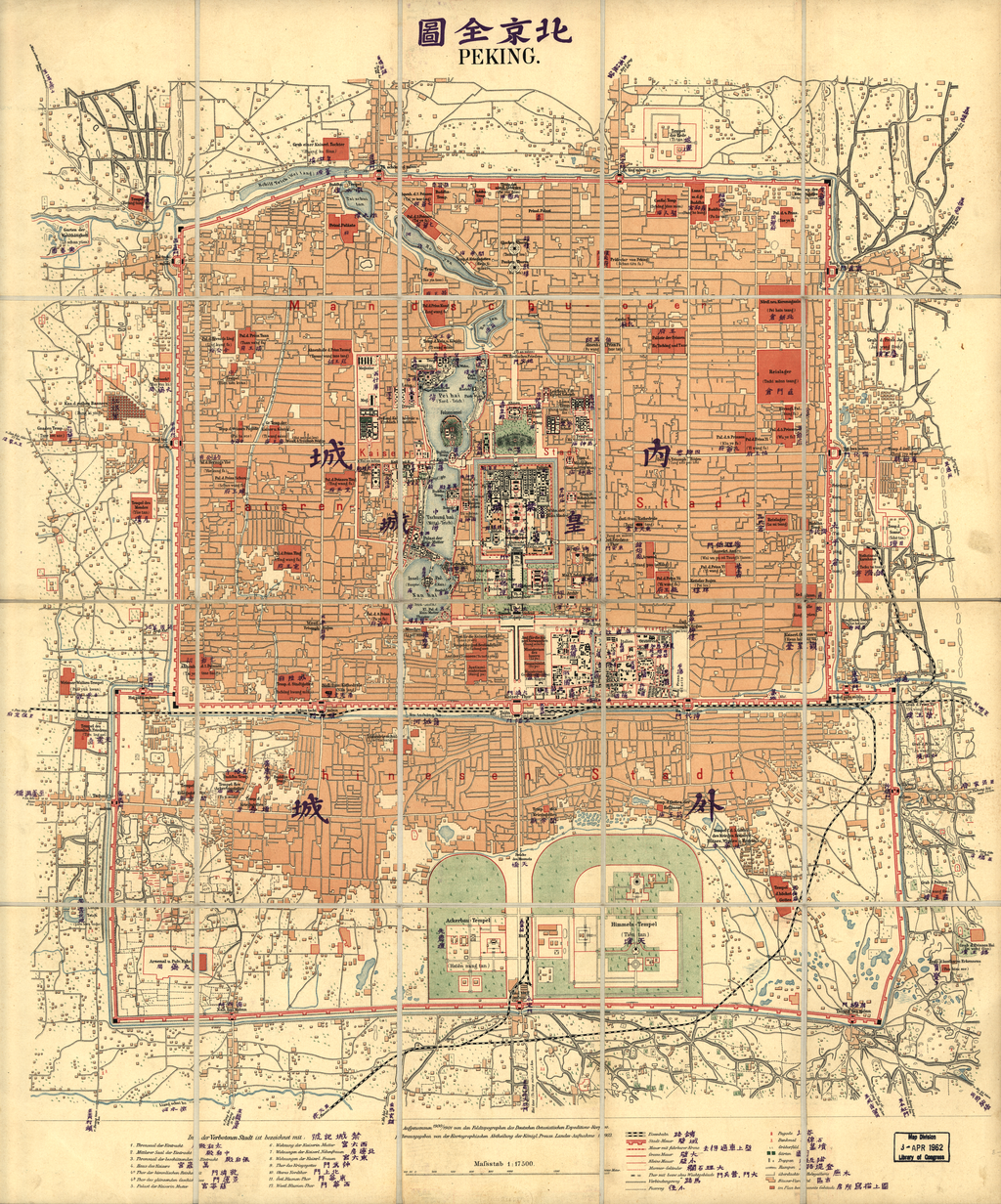
A map of Beijing from 1914. It was created by the German East-Asian Expeditionary Corps

Beijing, the political, cultural, military, and commercial centre of the empire, was the capital city of the last three dynasties of China; it was the last imperial capital built in China's history. Continuing and improving upon the construction and planning traditions of earlier dynasties, Beijing embodied some of the highest achievements in the field of city planning during the Ming and Qing dynasties. The construction of the fortification system borrowed ideas from Dadu of the Yuan era and Nanjing of the Ming era, and typified the Yuan and post-Yuan pre-Republican era city planning styles. It is the final example of China's 3,200 year-long square-shaped dynastical city planning style. It closely matched the scale of Chang'an of the Tang dynasty. The city was carefully planned during the early Ming dynasty, with a central axis running through the midpoints of the northern and southern walls, dividing the city into two equal parts to fulfil the Confucian ideals of "Golden mean"(居中不偏) and "不重不威". The Forbidden city was at the centre of it all, with Longevity Mount (Jingshan) just north of the palaces. The Imperial city, surrounding the palaces, provided everything necessary for the maintenance of the Emperor's lifestyle within the Forbidden city. The southern sections of the city were allocated to officials and bureaucrats, while the Inner and Outer city served as extra protection for the Imperial city and the palace complex. The streets, avenues, and boulevards of the city were straight and wide, presenting the imperialistic ideal of order. Everything, including Buddhist temples, Taoist temples, business districts, parks, and imperial family residences were all planned in accordance with the city's layout, its order being much stricter than that of Dadu, and larger in scale. The design of Beijing's fortifications borrowed elements from the Wujing Zongyao of the Northern Song dynasty (960–1127) and the already highly developed fortification construction expertise of the Southern Song (1127–1279). All of the structures used bricks and stones as foundations rather than rammed earth, including the watchtowers, the corner guard towers, the barbicans, the enemy sight towers, and the sluice gate towers. Forming both a planar and spatial defence for the city, it was dynastical China's best fortified city defence system, displaying the late dynastical China's greatest achievements in city fortification design.

Beijing's fortifications were described by American architect Edmund Bacon as "man's greatest single architectural achievement on the face of the Earth". Swedish scholar Osvald Sirén described the fortification's majestic views in his book The Walls and Gates of Peking. He wrote: "The gates may be called the mouths of the city; they are the openings through which this huge walled-in body of half a million or more organisms breathes and speaks. The life of the whole city becomes concentrated at the gates; everything that goes out of or in to it must pass these narrow openings. And that which passes in and out is not simply a mass of vehicles, animals, and human beings, but thoughts and desires, hopes and despairs, death and new life in the shape of marriage- and funeral-processions. At the gates can be felt the pulse of the whole city, as its life and purpose flows through the narrow openings—a pulse-beat which gives the rhythm of the life and activity of this highly complex organism which is called Peking." He concluded with a pessimistic view as to whether the fortifications would remain intact into the future. Indeed, the fortifications were subsequently dismantled one by one.

== Preservation ==
The call for restoration of the ancient architecture grew stronger in the period leading up to the 2008 Summer Olympics, hosted in Beijing. Demands for a complete or partial reconstruction of the original "凸"-shaped city defence system were made. The recently completed reconstruction of Yongdingmen is one example of such work, and will likely be followed by others in the future. A restored Inner and Outer city moat system will become part of the public waterway network; reconstruction of the three gates on the south of the city's central axis (and possibly all nine gates and three corner guard towers of the Inner city) is being discussed by officials. However, the former sites of gates such as Fuchengmen, Chaoyangmen, and Xuanwumen, are now busy roads with high rises and other major developments. An alternative would be to reconstruct them nearby, at less crowded sites. Some of the more likely projects are the restoration of the remaining fortifications and the reconstruction of parts of the city walls, projects which are less daunting and require much less funding. Between 2001 and 2003, the extant section of the Inner city wall just south of the Beijing train station was completely restored and was opened to the public as the Ming City Wall Relics Park. More wall segments were added to the park in 2005 and 2006. The Southeast Corner Tower has been restored and forms part of the park. Restoration of the section of the city wall near the Beijing Ancient Observatory and its enemy sight tower are in the planning stages, as well as the barbican at Zhengyangmen.

== See also ==
- Chinese city wall
- History of Beijing
