= Andingmen =

Gate in Beijing, China

Coordinates: 39.947146°N 116.400323°E

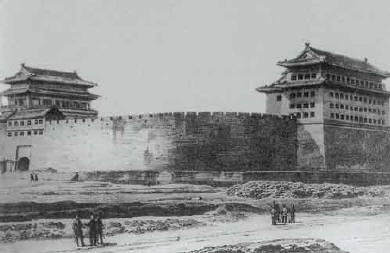
Andingmen in 1860

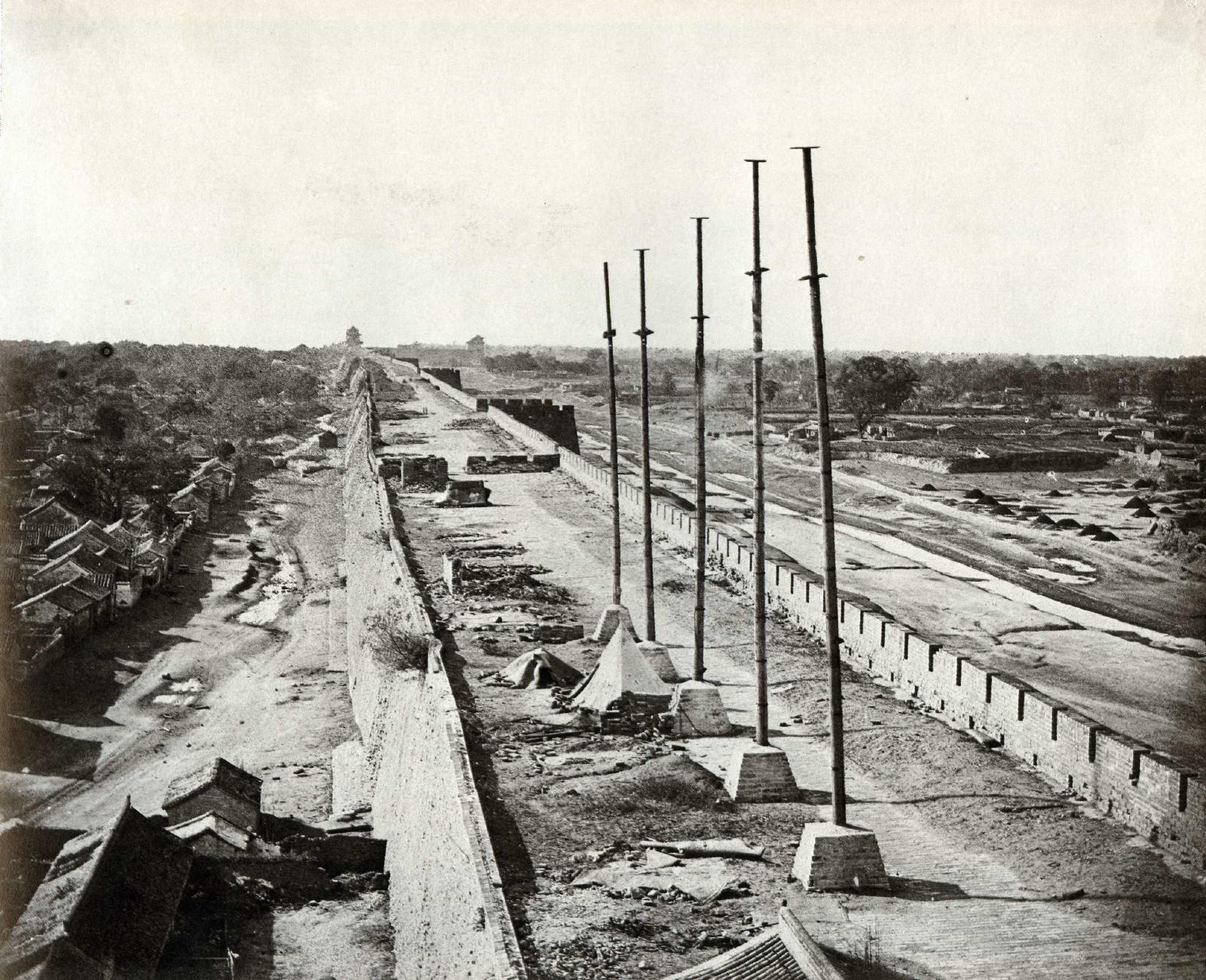
Atop the city wall at Andingmen in 1860

Andingmen (simplified Chinese: 安定门; traditional Chinese: 安定門; pinyin: Āndìngmén; lit. 'Gate of Stability') was a gate in Beijing's Ming-era city wall, which were built to protect the emperor and people against northern invaders. Like so many others, the gate was torn down in the 1950s.

Where the gate once stood is now Andingmen Bridge, a roundabout overpass on the northern 2nd Ring Road. The overpass links Andingmen Inner Street, which runs south of the overpass inside the walled city, and Andingmen Outer Street, which runs north away from the wall of the city.

Bus and trolleybus stops are nearby, along with Andingmen Station, Line 2 of the Beijing Subway.
