= Osvald Sirén =

Swedish art historian (1879–1966)

- Born: 6 April 1879; Helsinki, Finland
- Died: 26 June 1966 (aged 87); Stockholm, Sweden
- Scientific career
- Fields: History
- Institutions: Stockholm University (1908–1923); Nationalmuseum (1928–1945)

Chinese name
- Chinese: 喜龍仁
Transcriptions
Standard Mandarin
- Hanyu Pinyin: xi long ren
- Wade–Giles: hsi^{3} lung^{2}-ren^{2}

Osvald Sirén (6 April 1879 – 26 June 1966) was a Finnish-born Swedish art historian, whose interests included the art of 18th-century Sweden, Renaissance Italy and China.

== Biography ==
Sirén was born in Helsinki. He held the J.A. Berg Professorship of the History and Theory of Art at the Stockholm University 1908–1923 and was Keeper of painting and sculpture at Nationalmuseum 1928–1945. He died in Stockholm, aged 87.

In the area of Chinese art, his major books include Gardens of China, China and Gardens of Europe of the 18th century, Chinese Painting: Leading Masters and Principles, and The Walls and Gates of Peking (1924).

Sirén was an early member of the theosophist movement. In 1956, he was awarded the Charles Lang Freer Medal.

== Selected works ==
- A Descriptive Catalogue of the Pictures in the Jarves Collection Belonging to Yale University (1916)
- Giotto and Some of his Followers (1917)
- The Walls and Gates of Peking (1924)
- Chinese Sculpture from the Fifth to the Fourteenth Century; over 900 Specimens in Stone, Bronze, Lacquer and Wood, Principally from Northern China (1925)
- Les palais imperiaux de Pekin (1926)
- A History of Early Chinese Art (1929)
- The Chinese on the Art of Painting: Translations and Comments (1936)
- A History of Later Chinese Painting (1938)
- Gardens of China (1949)
- China and Gardens of Europe of the Eighteenth Century (1950)
- Chinese Painting: Leading Masters and Principles (1956)
- Chinese Sculptures in the von der Heydt Collection (1959)
