= Ritan =

Ritan might refer to:

- Ritan (Beijing), a park in Beijing
- Ritan (island), an island in Indonesia
