= Temple of Earth =

Building in Beijing, China

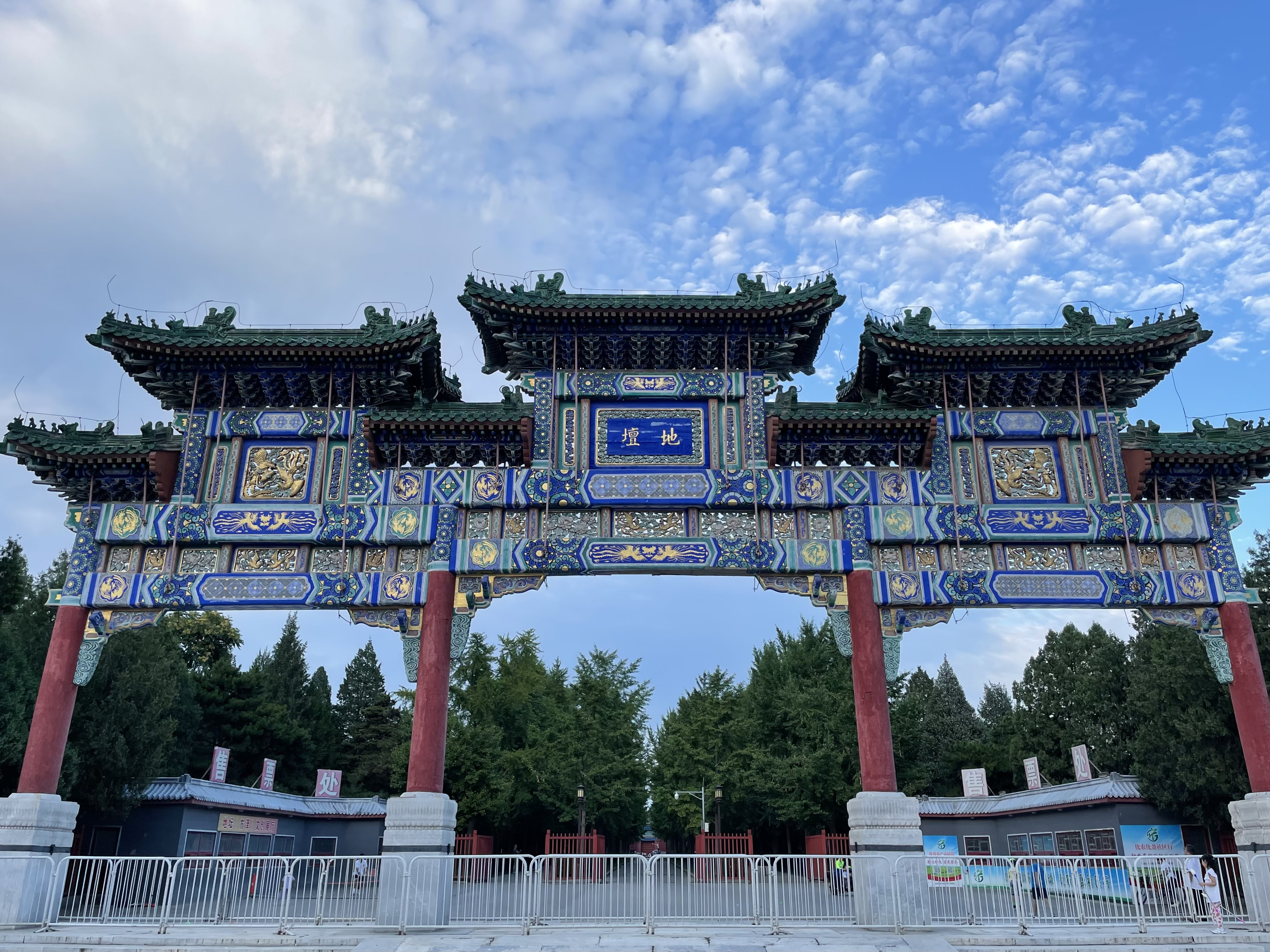
- Entrance of the Temple of Earth

- Location within Beijing Location within China
- 39.95142°N 116.4097°E
- Location: Dongcheng, Beijing, China

History
- Built: 1530 (Ming dynasty)

Site notes
- Area: 0.427 km^{2} (0.165 sq mi)
- Website: tiantanpark.com

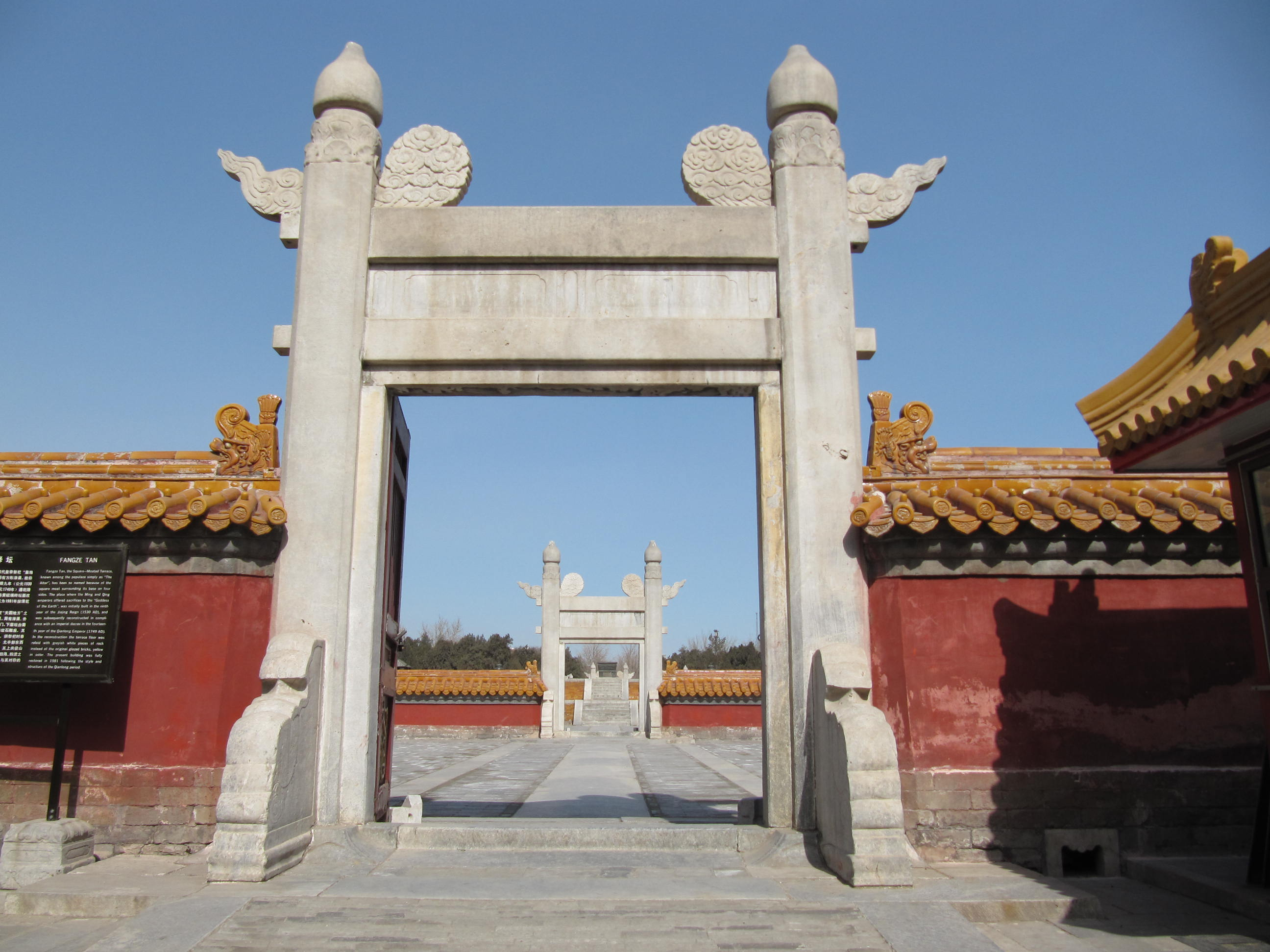
Stairway to the Altar at the Temple of Earth

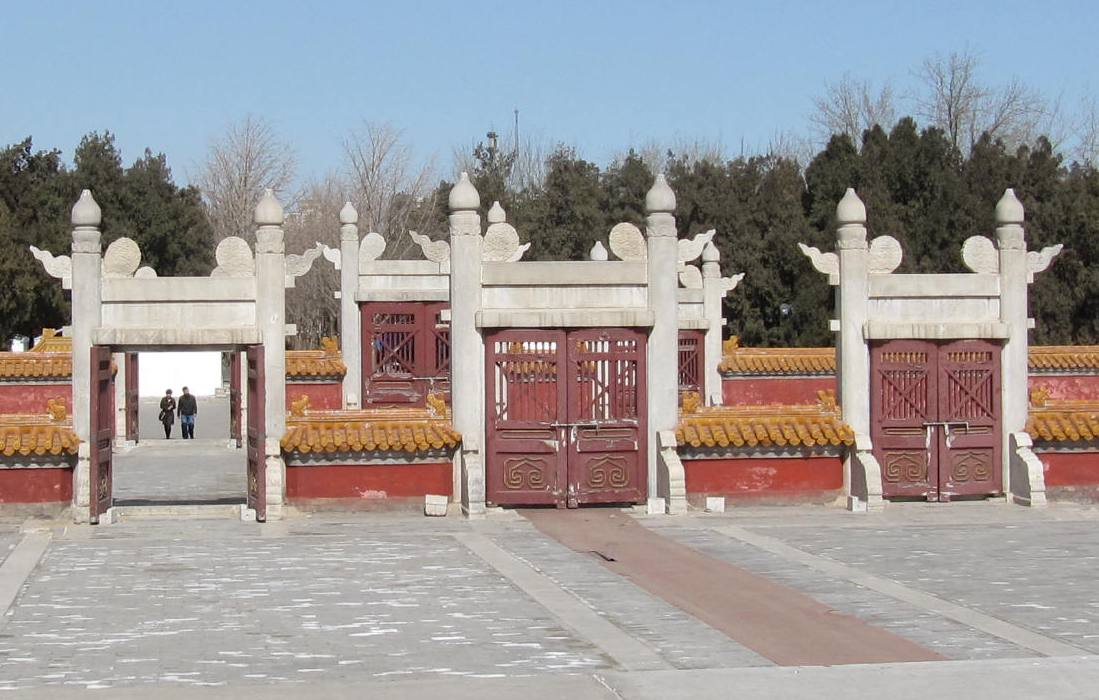
The "Star Gates" marking the boundary of the altar

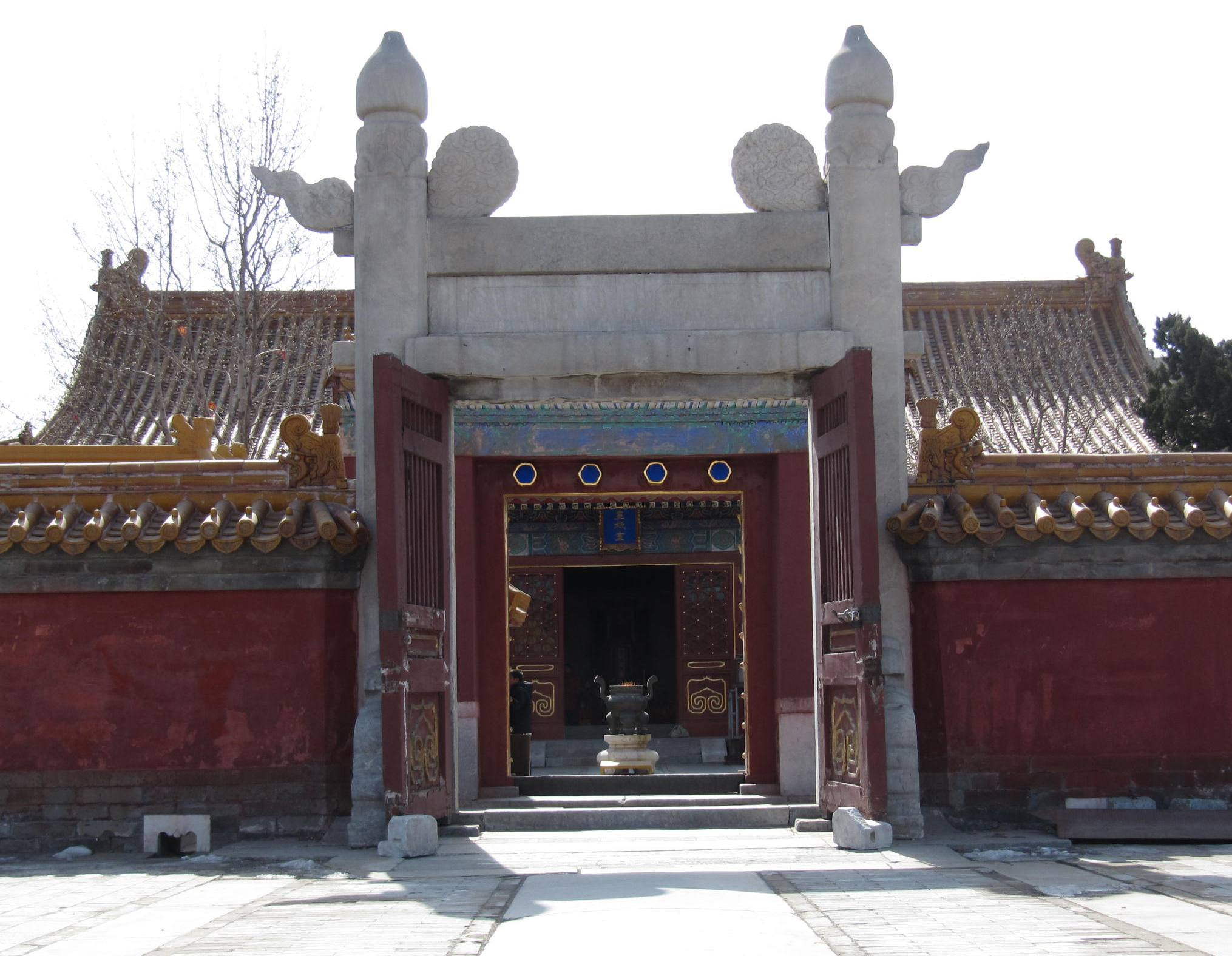
A "Star Gate" leading to a hall in the temple complex

The Temple of the Earth (simplified Chinese: 地坛; traditional Chinese: 地壇; pinyin: Dìtán) in Beijing, China, is located in the northern part of central Beijing, around the Andingmen area and just outside Beijing's second ring road. It is also located just a few hundred yards north of Yonghe Temple. At 42.7 hectares (106 acres), it is the second largest of the five Temples of Beijing behind only the Temple of Heaven.

It was built in 1530 during the Ming dynasty. Emperors of the Ming and Qing dynasties would attend the annual summer solstice ritual of offerings to the heaven.

The Temple of Heaven in Chongwenmen lies opposite it in the southern end of the old city.

== History ==
=== Location, Architecture and Construction ===
The Temple of Earth (also referred to as the Ditan Park) was constructed in 1530 by the Jiajing Emperor during the Ming dynasty. The park covers a 40 hectares (99 acres) space outside of Beijing's second ring road. This places the park in the middle of a heavily populated area. The park features lush gardens and tree lined paths. During the Cultural Revolution, the temple was damaged; however, the site has been restored and renovated since then.

For thousands of years, the Chinese have believed that important cosmic things could be symbolized using common shapes and directions. Because the Temple symbolizes the Earth, its footprint is square in shape. The square is a powerful symbol in Chinese culture and mythology which can mean Earth or the ground. The Temple's construction mirrors these beliefs with its many square walls and altars. The Temple of Earth is also located in the north of Beijing, north being the direction associated with the Earth. In contrast to this, the much larger Temple of Heaven is circular in shape, symbolizing the heavens and sky, and is located in the south of Beijing. These two temples, along with the Temple of the Moon and Temple of the Sun (located in the west and east, respectively), interact with each other in spiritually important ways. The Chinese government has listed the Earth temple as one of the most important historical monuments under special preservation.

=== Ditan Park Today ===
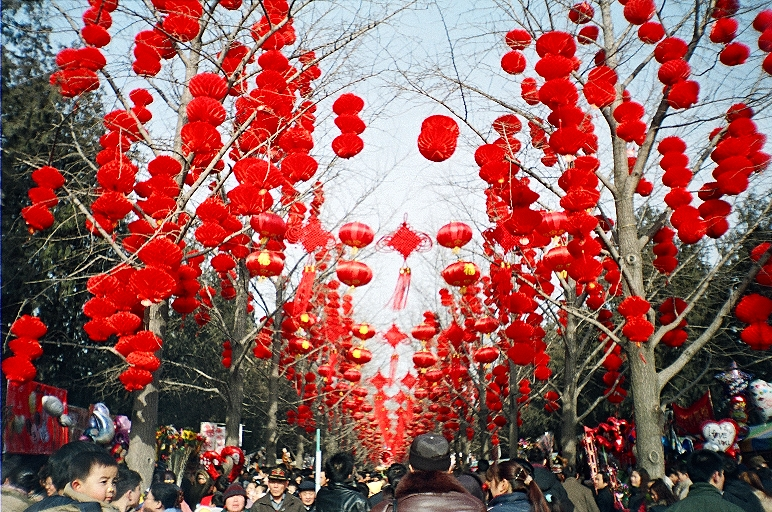
Festival at the Temple of Earth

It is common to see foreigners and Chinese tourists in the actual Temple of Earth in the park. The Temple itself is actually a very small. Aside from the Temple, the park offers a children's play arcade, water calligraphy (where tourists can purchase oversized brushes and "paint" with water on the cement), food, and other attractions. The park is frequented by joggers and runners, and is a very popular place to do Tai Chi. Since the 1980s, traditional temple fairs have been held regularly during the Chinese lunar new year.

== Religious Purpose ==
The Temple of Earth is the main temple in Beijing where people can worship the god of Earth.

=== Rituals and Events ===
The Temple of Earth was used for a specific purpose. Emperors of the Ming, and then later the Qing dynasties used the Temple for sacrifices which were used to appease the gods, who in turn would help the nation. These sacrifices took place at the Temple of Earth during the summer solstice. Some things that sacrifices were done for include good harvest, a strong stable nation, and good weather.

During the Chinese New Year (which usually begins on the first day of the first lunar month of the year) the Temple of Earth holds a very popular festival. The festival features thousands of red lanterns hanged on the many trees of the park, and thousands of locals and tourist flock to the park every year to participate.

=== Shrines, Altars and Buildings ===
The altar in the centre of the Temple of Earth in Ditan Park is called Fangze Tan, or "square water altar". The altar is square shaped, once again referring to the old Chinese idea of a square shaped Earth. The altar used to be surrounded by water, but these days it is drained. The altar was used to offer sacrifices to the Earth God. On a north-south axis, the temple consists of 5 main buildings. The Fangze Altar, The Imperial Respecting House, The Sacrifice Pavilion, The Fast Palace and the Divine Warehouse. The Fangze platform, also known as the Worship Platform, is the main building in the temple covering almost 18,000 square metres (190,000 sq ft).

== See also ==
- Nine Altars and Eight Temples
