= Altar of Heaven =

Altar of Heaven may refer to:

- Ara Coeli, legendary ancient altar on the Capitoline Hill in Rome
- Temple of Heaven, Ming temple complex in Beijing
