= Temple of Agriculture =

Coordinates: 39°52′36″N 116°23′10″E

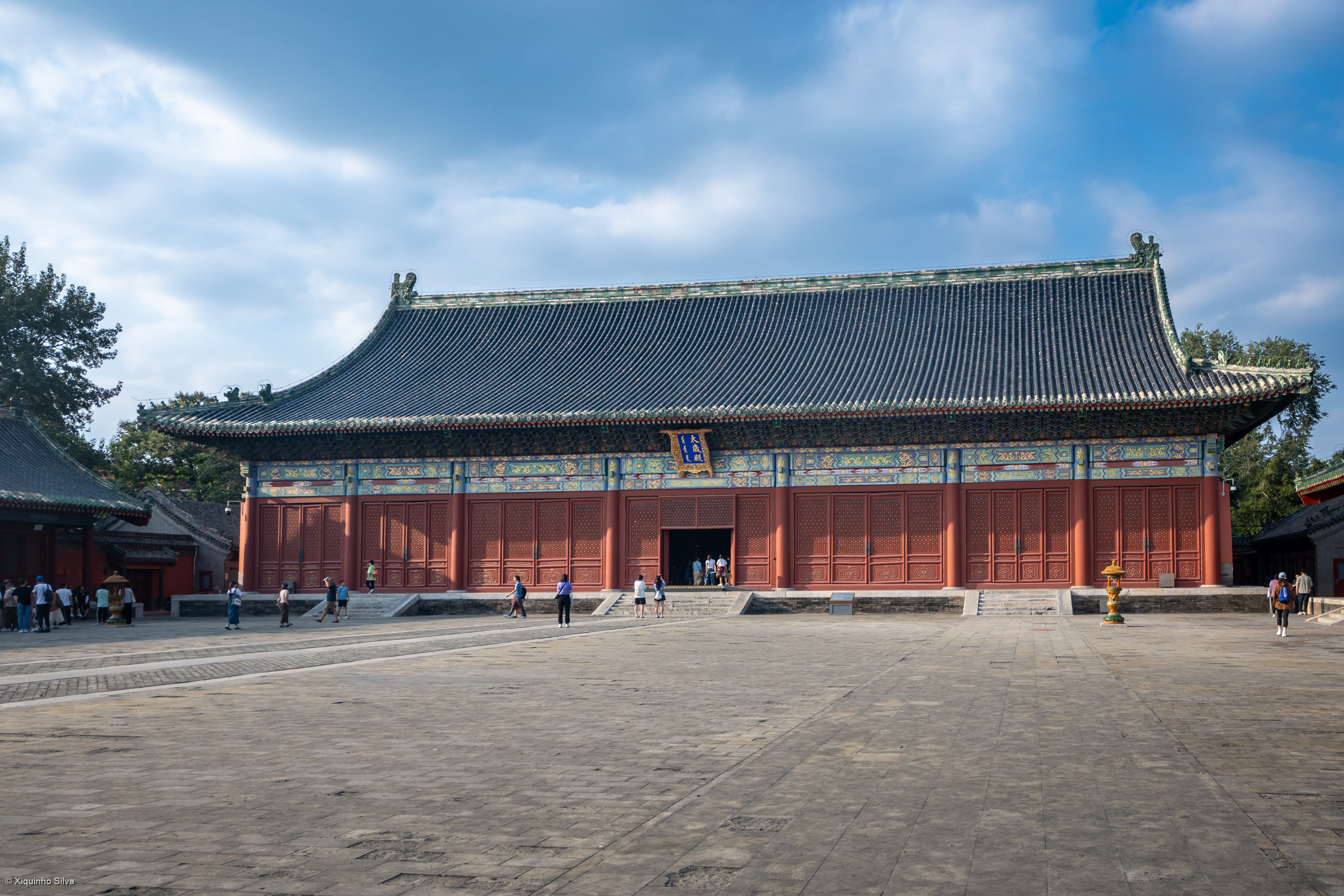
Taisui Pavilion

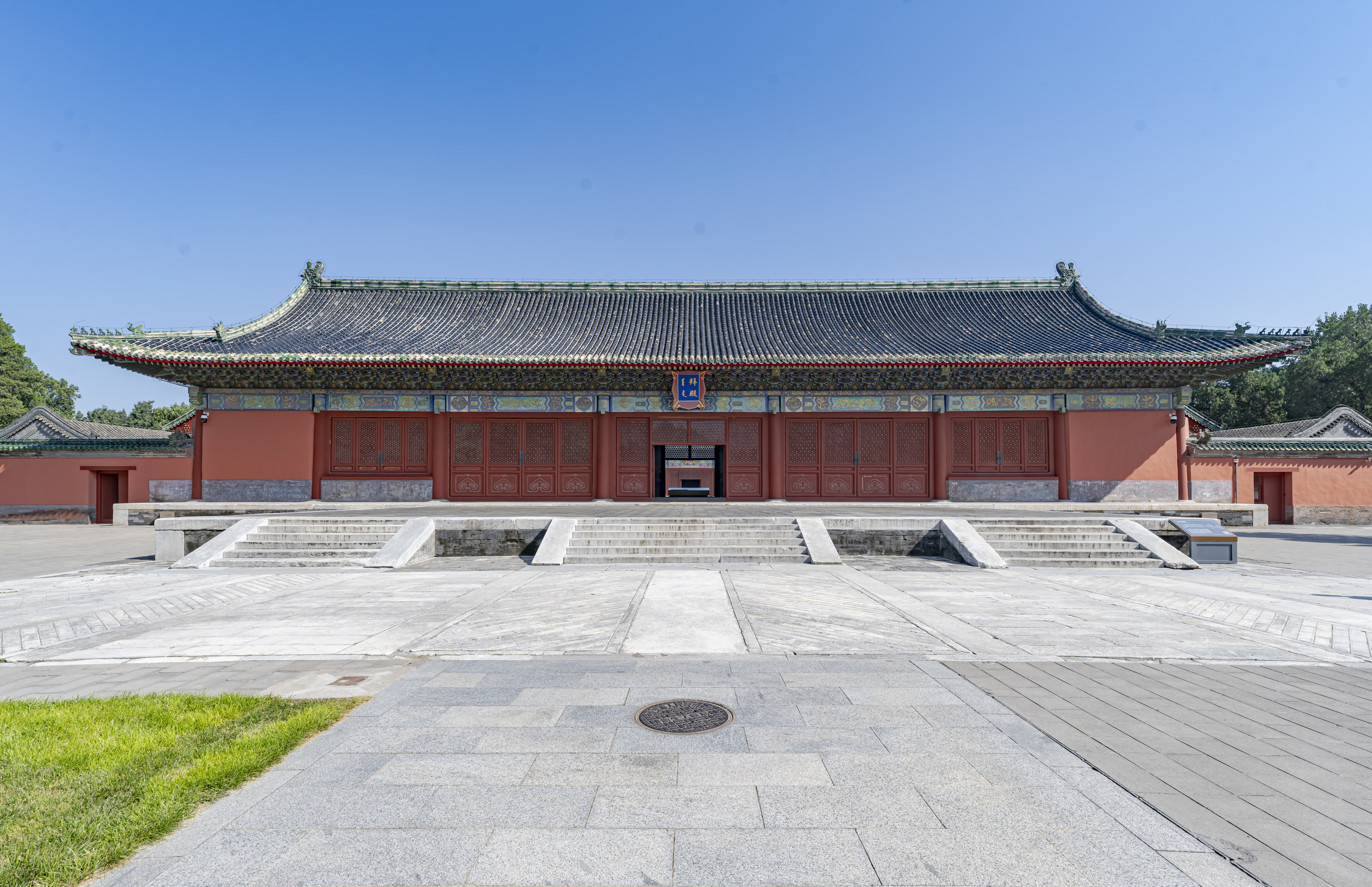
Warship Pavilion

Temple of Agriculture (simplified Chinese: 先农坛; traditional Chinese: 先農壇; pinyin: Xiānnóng Tán) or Altar of the God of Agriculture is a historic site in Xicheng District (Note: The site was in the former Xuanwu District, which has now been merged into Xicheng District.) of Beijing, China, and located near the Temple of Heaven.

== History ==
The Temple of Agriculture was built in the 15th century. It was used by Ming and Qing emperors to perform sacrifices to Xiannong (先农), the mythical Emperor Yandi (c. 2900 BC-2800 BC), who is said to have invented the plow, discovered the medicinal uses of plants, and created the first marketplaces.

The temple's Jufu Hall was included in the 1998 World Monuments Watch by the World Monuments Fund (WMF) when it was in danger of collapse, and again in 2000 along with the rest of the temple. In 1998, American Express provided funding through WMF for the restoration of the structure. Other structures on the site were subsequently restored, and the work included stabilization, wood treatment, repair and conservation of the tiles, and consolidation and preservation of the painted decoration. Today, the site has the status of Major Site Protected at the National Level of China.

== In artwork ==
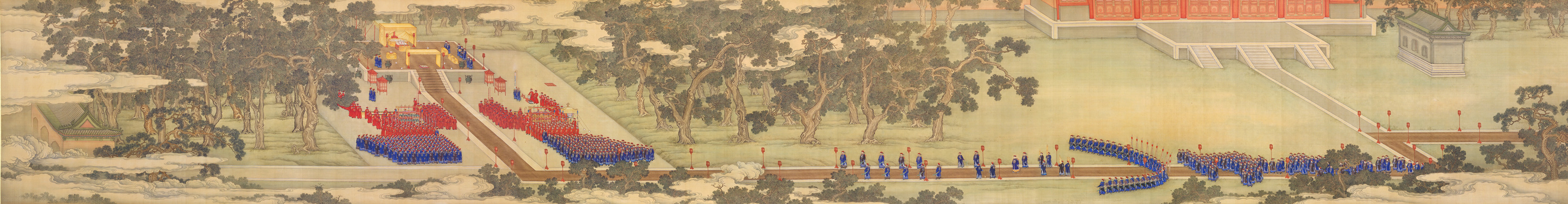
"The Yongzheng Emperor Offering Sacrifice at the Xiannong Altar" from the Qing Dynasty.

== See also ==
- Nine Altars and Eight Temples
