= Temple of Heaven =

Imperial complex of religious buildings in Beijing, China

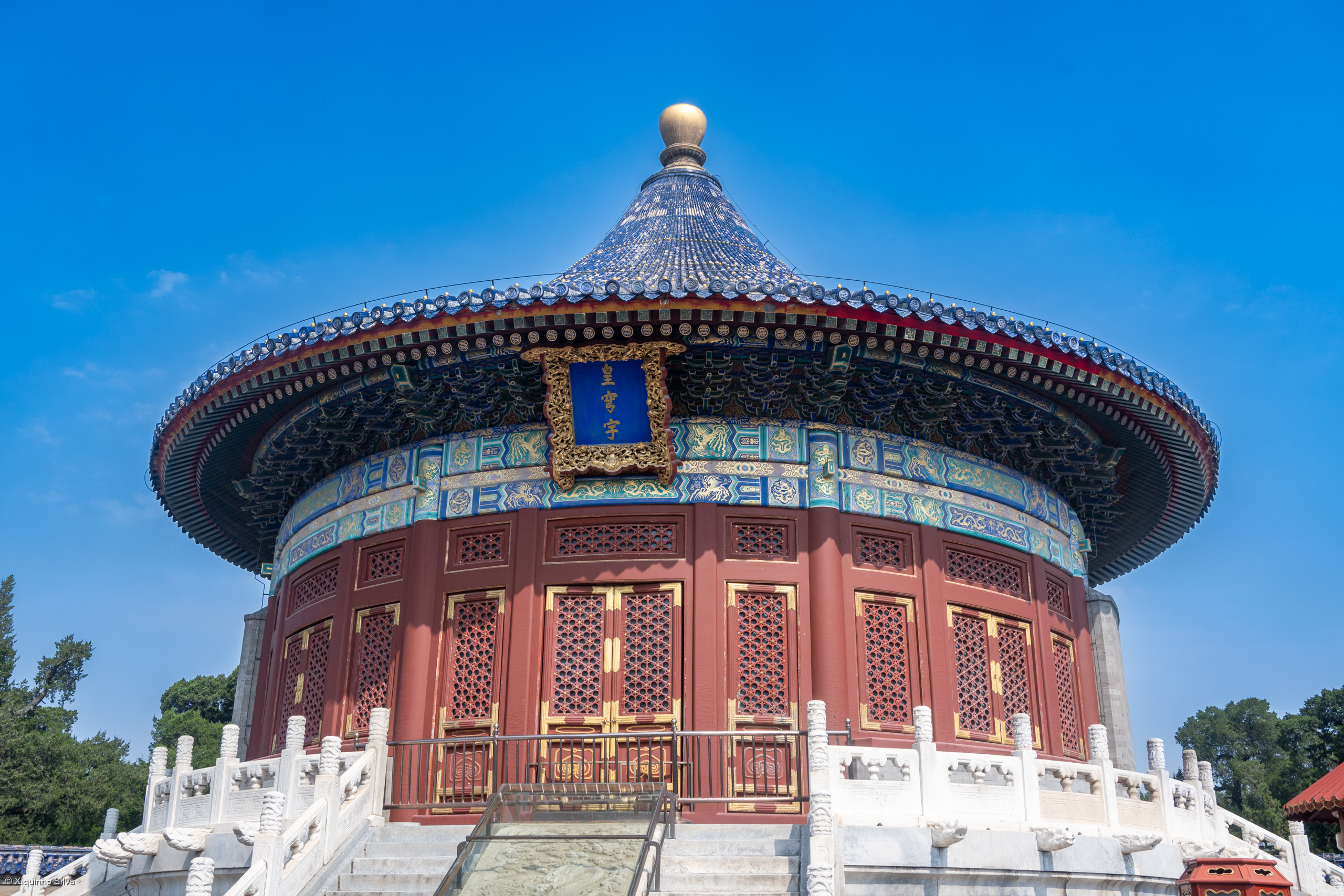
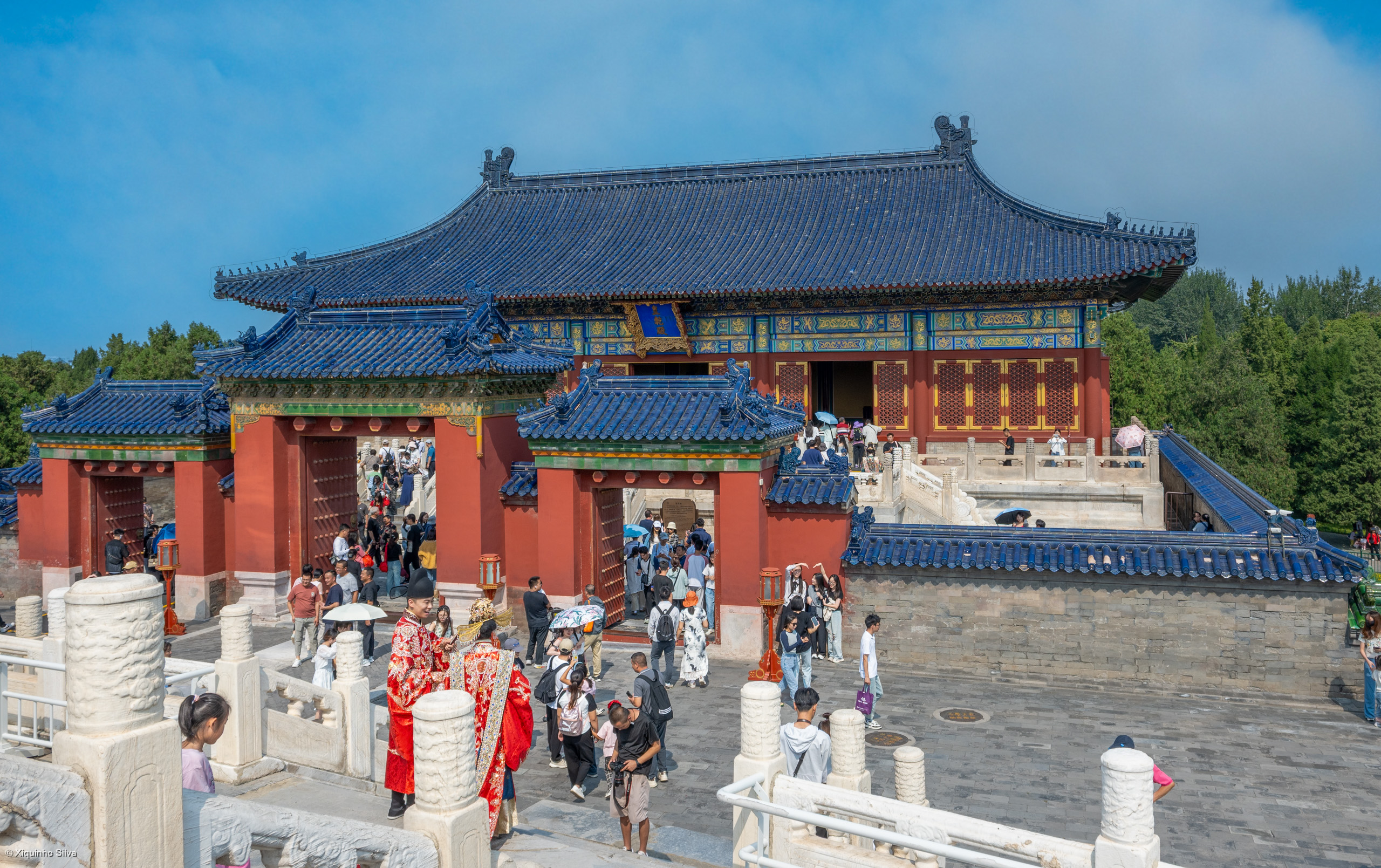
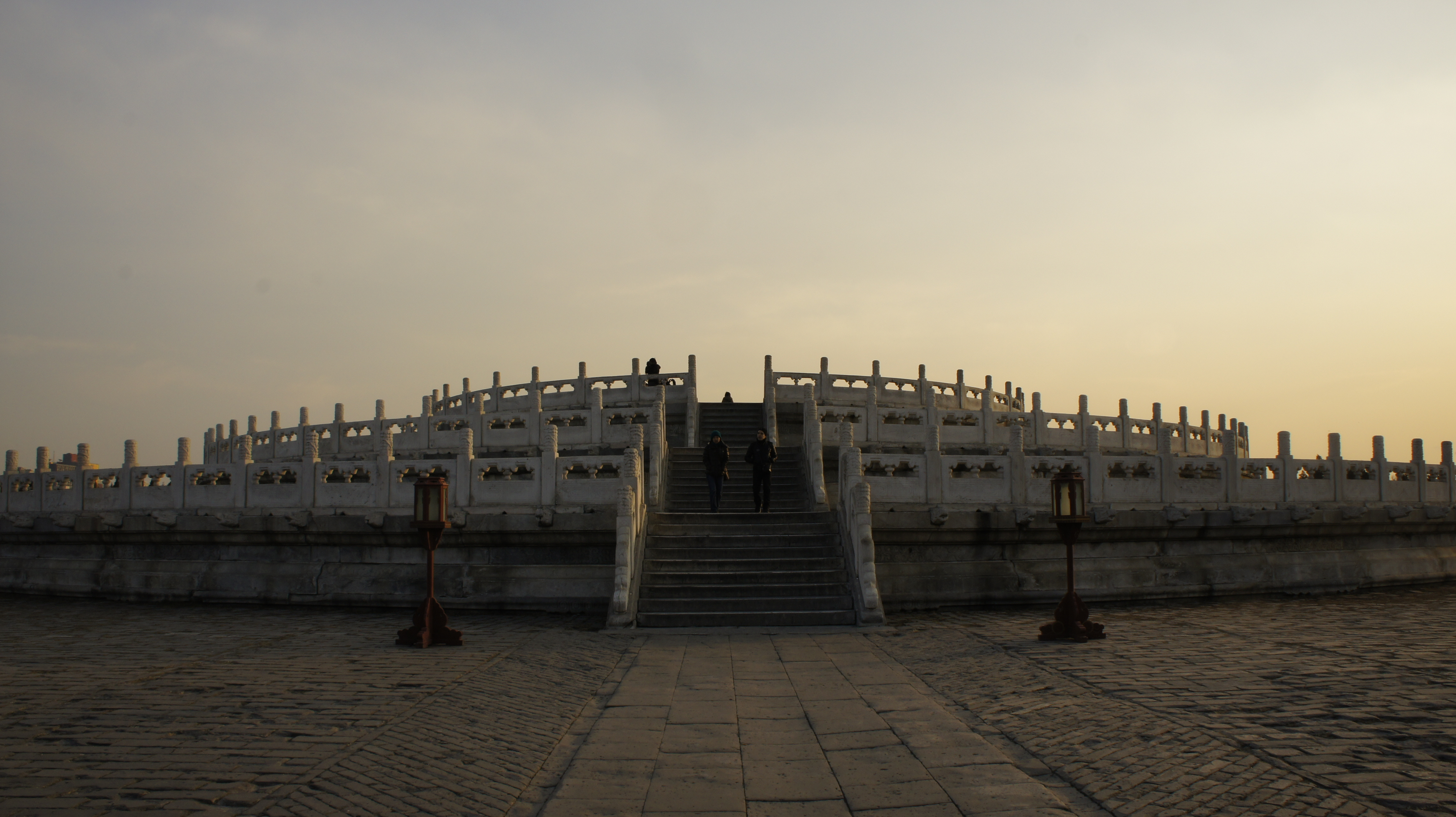
- Hall of Prayer for Good Harvests Imperial Vault of Heaven Imperial Prayer Hall Circular Mound Altar

- Location within Beijing Location within China
- 39.8822°N 116.4066°E
- Location: Dongcheng, Beijing, China

History
- Built: 1406–1420 (Ming dynasty)

Site notes
- Area: 2.73 km^{2} (1.05 sq mi)
- Website: tiantanpark.com

UNESCO World Heritage Site
- Official name: Temple of Heaven: an Imperial Sacrificial Altar in Beijing
- Type: Cultural
- Criteria: i, ii, iii
- Designated: 1998 (22nd session)
- Reference no.: 881
- Region: Asia-Pacific

Temple of Heaven
- "Temple of Heaven" in Simplified (top) and Traditional (bottom) Chinese characters
- Simplified Chinese: 天坛
- Traditional Chinese: 天壇
- Literal meaning: "Altar of Heaven"
Transcriptions
Standard Mandarin
- Hanyu Pinyin: Tiāntán
- IPA: [tʰjɛ́ntʰǎn]
Yue: Cantonese
- Yale Romanization: Tīn-tàahn
- Jyutping: Tin1-taan4
Southern Min
- Tâi-lô: Thinn-tuânn

The Temple of Heaven (simplified Chinese: 天坛; traditional Chinese: 天壇; pinyin: Tiāntán) is a complex of imperial religious Confucian buildings situated in the southeastern part of central Beijing. The complex was visited by the Emperors of the Ming and then later restored by the Qing dynasties for annual ceremonies of prayer to Heaven for a good harvest and other seasonal rites. The Temple of Heaven was inscribed as a World Heritage site in 1998 and was described as "a masterpiece of architecture and landscape design which simply and graphically illustrates a cosmogony of great importance for the evolution of one of the world's great civilizations..." as the "symbolic layout and design of the Temple of Heaven had a profound influence on architecture and planning in the Far East over many centuries."

== History ==
The temple complex was first built in 1420, during the reign of the Yongle Emperor of the Ming dynasty, who was also responsible for the construction of the Forbidden City in Beijing. It was later expanded and reconstructed under the Jiajing Emperor and the Qianlong Emperor. During the Jiajing reign in the 16th century, the former Altar of Heaven and Earth was renamed the Temple of Heaven in 1534. Jiajing also built three other prominent temples in Beijing, the Temple of the Sun (日壇) in the east, the Temple of Earth (地壇) in the north, and the Temple of Moon (月壇) in the west. The present layout of the complex was largely formed by 1749, following Qing-period reconstruction. The Temple of Heaven is located in Dongcheng District, Beijing, and was inscribed as a UNESCO World Heritage Site in 1998.

The temple was occupied by the Anglo-French alliance during the Second Opium War. In 1900, during the Boxer Rebellion, the Eight-Nation Alliance occupied the temple complex and turned it into the force's temporary command in Peking, which lasted for one year. With the downfall of the Qing, the temple complex was left un-managed. The neglect of the temple complex led to the collapse of several halls in the following years.

In 1914, Yuan Shikai, then President of the Republic of China, performed a Ming prayer ceremony at the temple, as part of an effort to have himself declared Emperor of China. In 1918 the temple was turned into a park and for the first time open to the public.

Like many historical sites in China, the building was targeted and vandalized by rioters during the Cultural Revolution.

== Buildings and layout ==
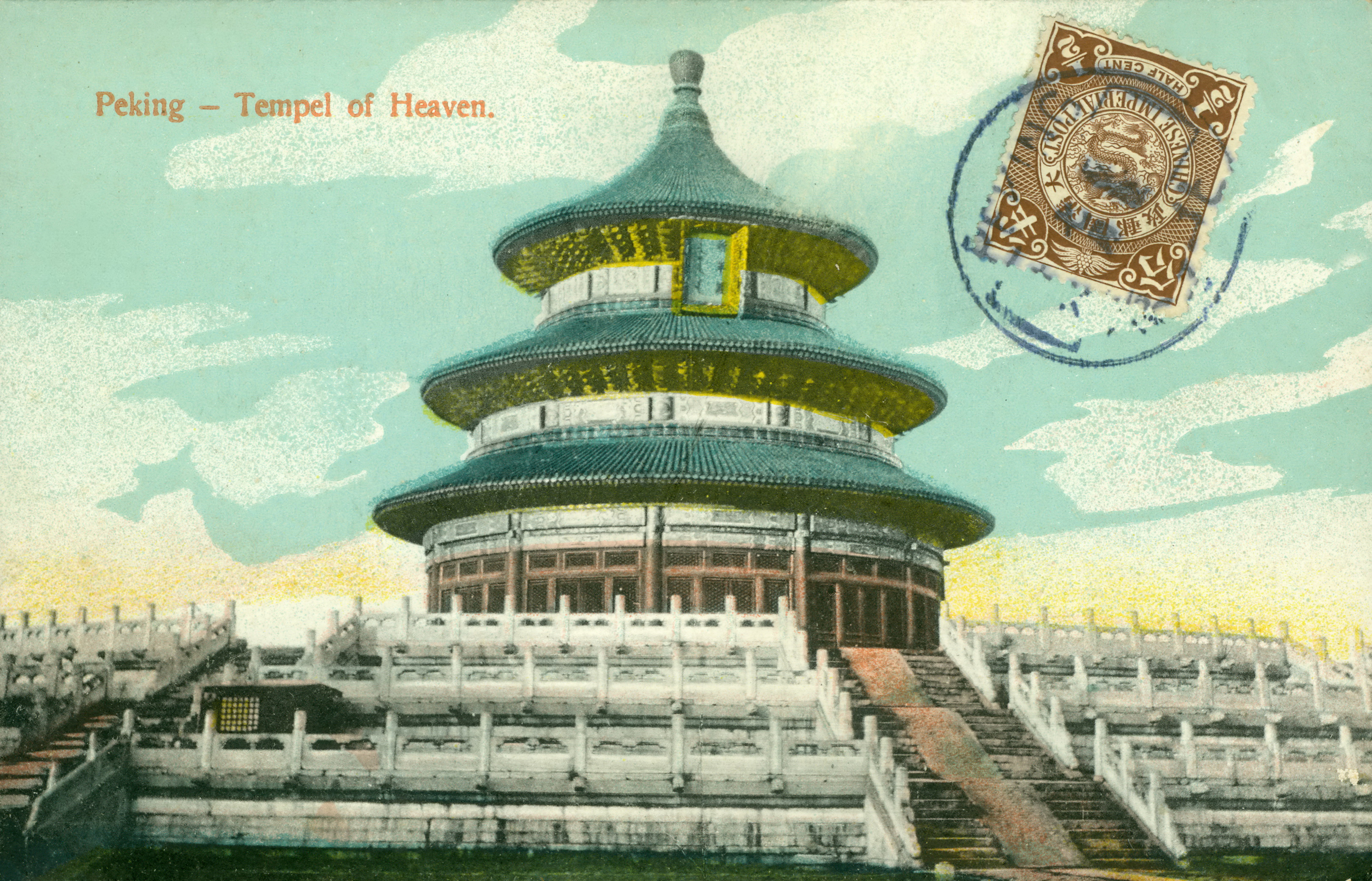
Temple of Heaven on an 1898 postcard

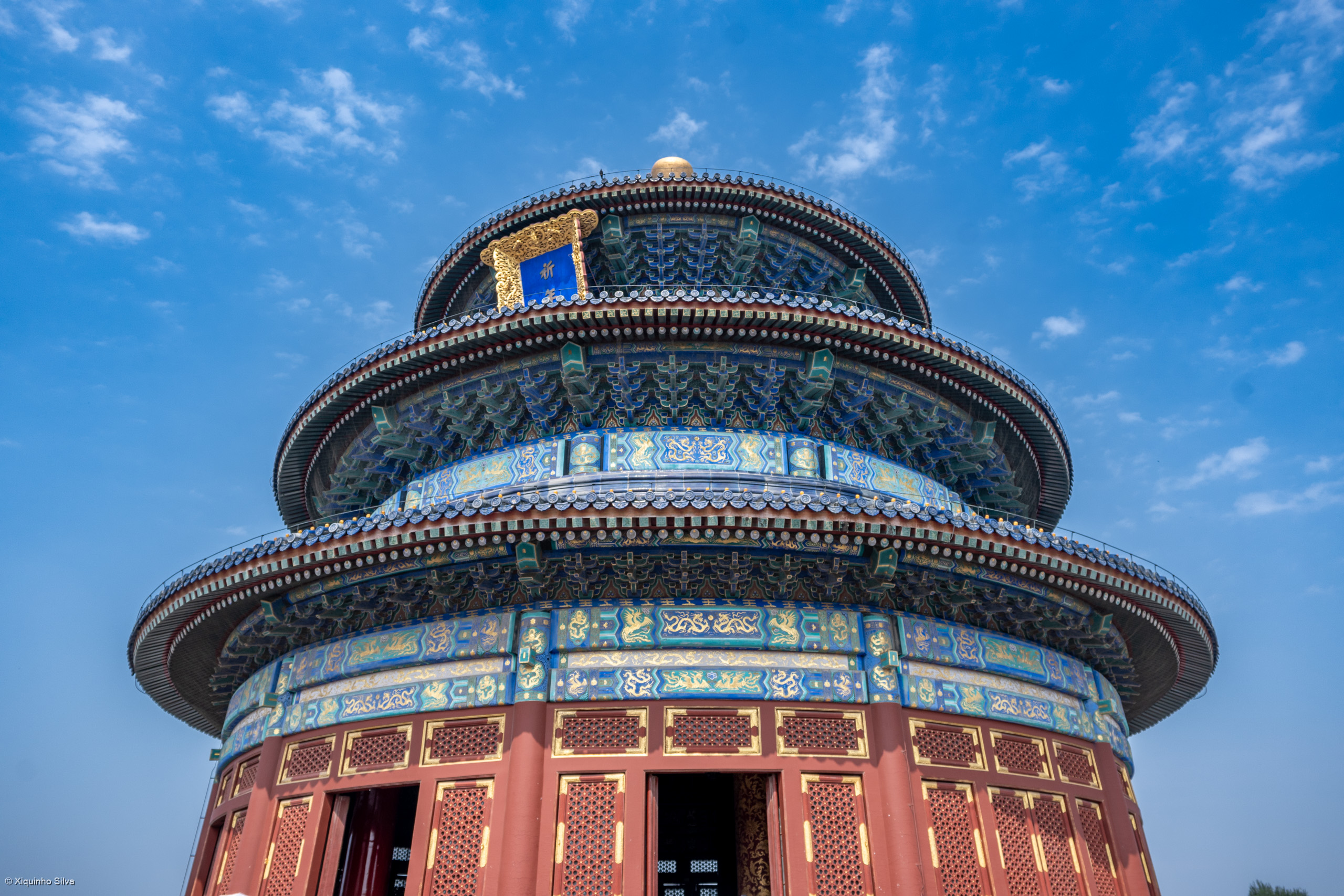
Hall of Prayer for Good Harvests

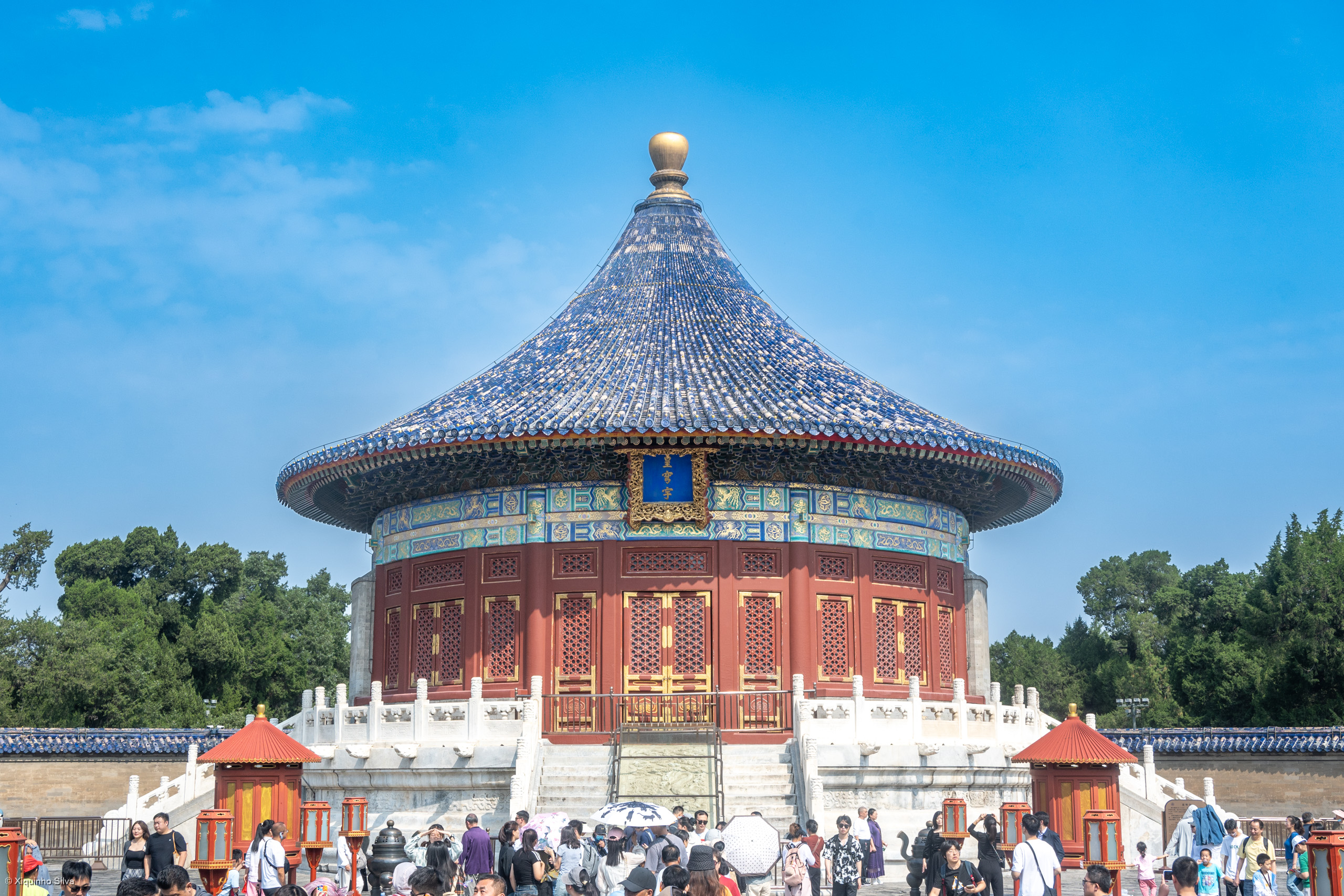
Imperial Vault of Heaven

The temple's architectural components such as the number of its columns, its circular form, and number of terraces are said to symbolize the structure of the cosmos. The Temple grounds cover 2.73 km^{2} (1.05 sq mi) of parkland and comprises three main groups of constructions, all built according to strict philosophical requirements:

- The Hall of Prayer for Good Harvests (祈年殿) is a triple-gabled circular building, 36 m (118 ft) in diameter and 38 m (125 ft) tall, built on three levels of marble stone base, where the Emperor prayed for good harvests. The building is completely wooden, with no nails. The original building was burned down by a fire caused by lightning in 1889. The current building was re-built several years after the incident.
- The Imperial Vault of Heaven (皇穹宇) is a single-gabled circular building, built on a single level of marble stone base. It is located south of the Hall of Prayer for Good Harvests and resembles it, but is smaller. It is surrounded by a smooth circular wall, the Echo Wall, that can transmit sounds over large distances. The Imperial Vault is connected to the Hall of Prayer by the Vermilion Steps Bridge, a 360-meter-long (1,180 ft) raised walkway that slowly ascends from the Vault to the Hall of Prayer. The dome for this building also has no crossbeams to support the dome.
- The Circular Mound Altar (圜丘坛) is the altar proper, located south of the Imperial Vault of Heaven. It is an empty circular platform on three levels of marble stones, each decorated by lavishly carved dragons. The numbers of various elements of the Altar, including its balusters and steps, are either the sacred number nine or its nonuples. The center of the altar is a round slate called the Heart of Heaven (天心石) or the Supreme Yang (太阳石), where the Emperor prayed for favorable weather. Thanks to the design of the altar, the sound of the prayer will be reflected by the guardrail, creating significant resonance, which was supposed to help the prayer communicate with Heaven. The Altar was built in 1530 by the Jiajing Emperor and rebuilt in 1740.

== Ceremony ==
In ancient China, the Emperor of China was regarded as the Son of Heaven, who administered earthly matters on behalf of, and representing, heavenly authority. To be seen to be showing respect to the source of his authority, in the form of sacrifices to heaven, was extremely important. The temple was built for these ceremonies, mostly comprising prayers for good harvests.

Twice a year the Emperor and all his retinue would move from the Forbidden City through Beijing to encamp within the complex, wearing special robes and abstaining from eating meat. No ordinary Chinese was allowed to view this procession or the following ceremony. In the temple complex the Emperor would personally pray to Heaven for good harvests. The highpoint of the ceremony at the winter solstice was performed by the Emperor on the Earthly Mount. The ceremony had to be perfectly completed; it was widely held that the smallest of mistakes would constitute a bad omen for the whole nation in the coming year.

== Symbolism ==
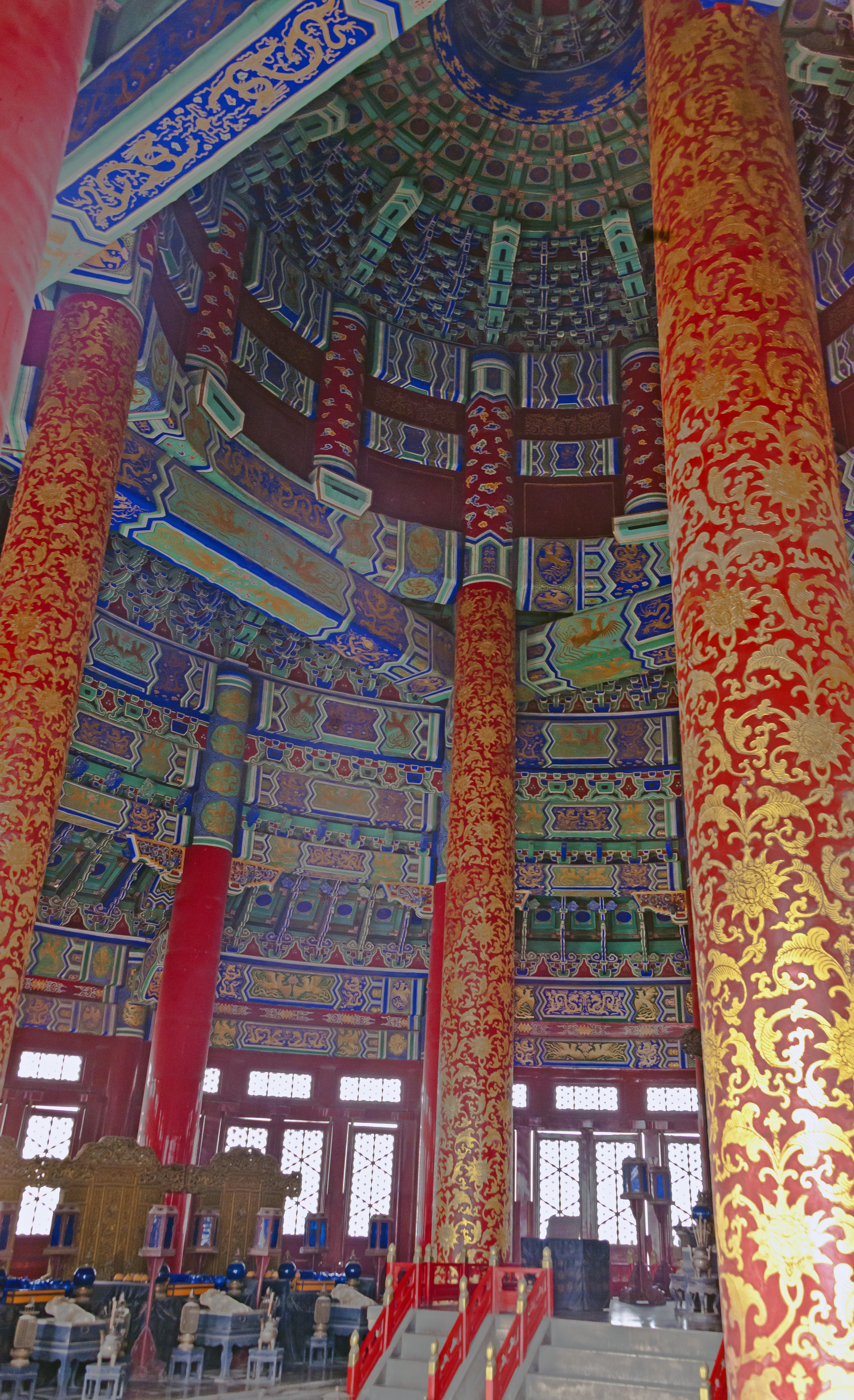
Inside the Hall of Prayer for Good Harvests.

Earth was represented by a square and Heaven by a circle; several features of the temple complex symbolize the connection of Heaven and Earth, of circle and square. The whole temple complex is surrounded by two cordons of walls; the outer wall has a taller, semi-circular northern end, representing Heaven, and a shorter, rectangular southern end, representing the Earth. Both the Hall of Prayer for Good Harvests and the Circular Mound Altar are round, each standing on a square yard, again representing Heaven and Earth. The number nine represents the Emperor and is evident in the design of the Circular Mound Altar: a single round marmor plate is surrounded by a ring of nine plates, then a ring of 18 plates, and so on for a total of nine surrounding rings, the outermost having 9×9 plates.

The Hall of Prayer for Good Harvests has four inner, twelve middle and twelve outer pillars, representing the four seasons, twelve months and twelve traditional Chinese hours respectively. Combined, the twelve middle and twelve outer pillars represent the traditional solar terms. All the buildings within the Temple have special dark blue roof tiles, representing the Heaven.

The Seven-Star Stone Group, east of the Hall of Prayer for Good Harvest, represents the seven peaks of Taishan Mountain, a place of Heaven worship in classical China.

There are four main supportive, dragon pillars each representing a season. The structure, held up by these dragons, imitates the style of an ancient Chinese royal palace. Twelve inner pillars symbolize the lunar months, and it is thought that the twelve outer pillars refer to the 12 two-hour periods of the day.

== Park ==
The surrounding park is quite extensive, with the entire complex totaling 267 hectares (660 acres). Some of it consists of playgrounds, exercise and game areas. These facilities are well used by adults, as well as by parents and grandparents bringing children to play. Some of the open spaces and side buildings are often used, particularly in the morning, for choral shows, ethnic dances, and other presentations.

== Access ==
The Temple of Heaven is located in southern Dongcheng District, which until 2010 was part of Chongwen District. The park itself is open daily from 6:00 AM to 10:00 PM. The relic sites inside the park open at 8:00 and close at 17:30 from April 1 to October 31, and close at 17:00 from November 1 to March 31. There is a nominal entry charge which varies according to whether it is peak season or off season. Tickets stop selling one hour and a half before gate closing.

All four major entrances of the park are accessible by public transportation.

- East Gate on Tiantan East Road and Tiyuguan Road: Beijing Subway Line 5 Temple of Heaven East Gate station; Beijing Bus routes 25, 36, 39, 208, 525, 610, 685, 686, 723, 827, 829, 957, 958
- West Gate on Tianqiao South Street and Nanwei Road: Beijing Subway Line 8 Tianqiao station; Beijing Bus route 2, 15, 17, 20, 35, 36, 69, 71, 120, 203, 504, 707, 729, 特11 and BRT1
- North Gate on Tiantan Road and Qinian Street: Beijing Bus routes 6, 34, 35, 36, 106, 110, 687, 707
- South Gate on Yongdingmen East Street and Jingtai Road: Beijing Bus routes 36, 53, 120, 122, 208, 525, 610, 958, 特3, 特11, 特12, 运通102

== Panoramas ==
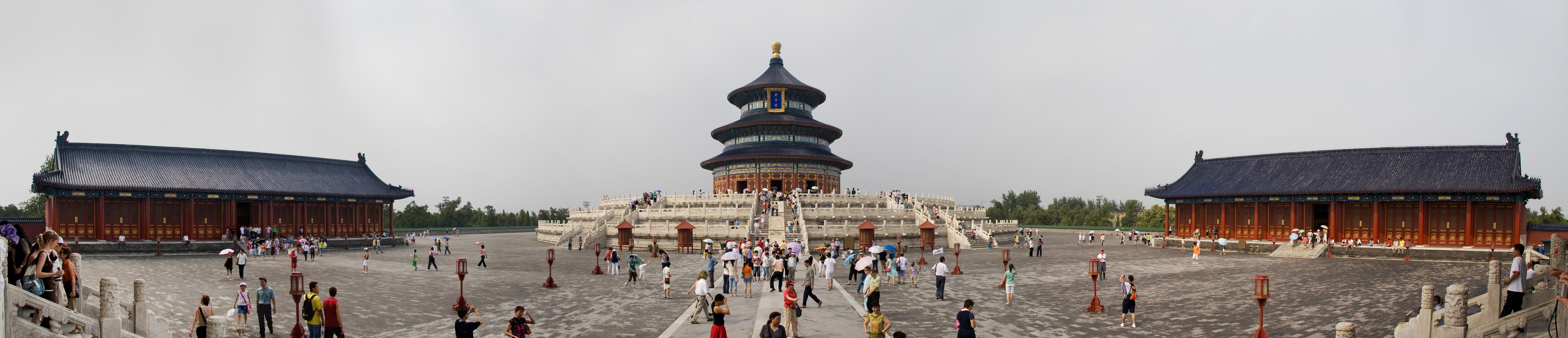
Panorama with the Hall of Prayer for Good Harvests in the center, viewed from the south
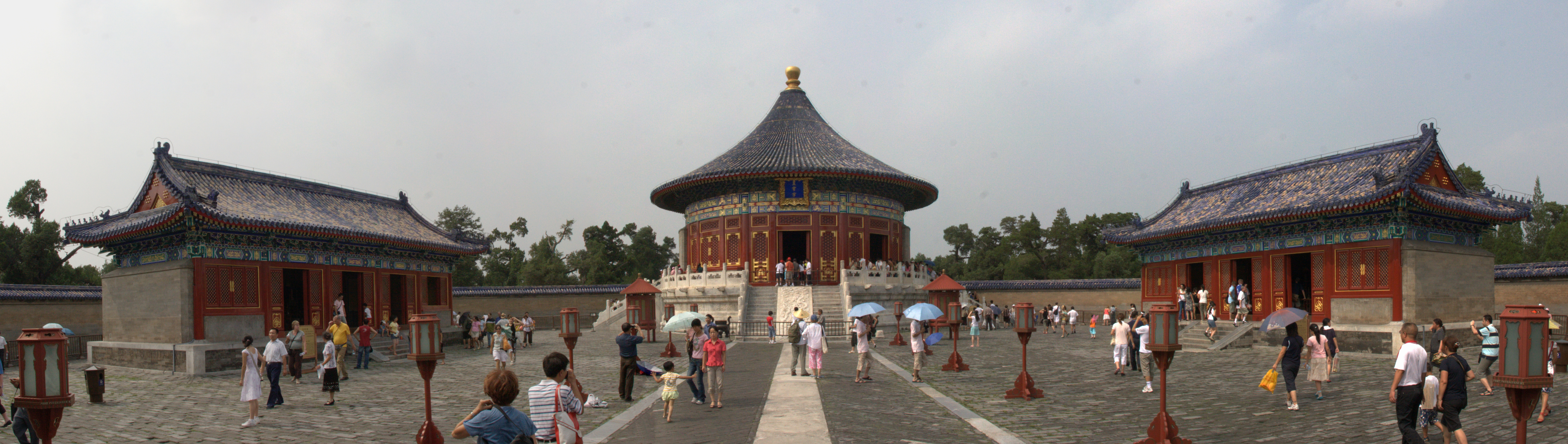
Panorama from the opposite view of the Imperial Vault of Heaven
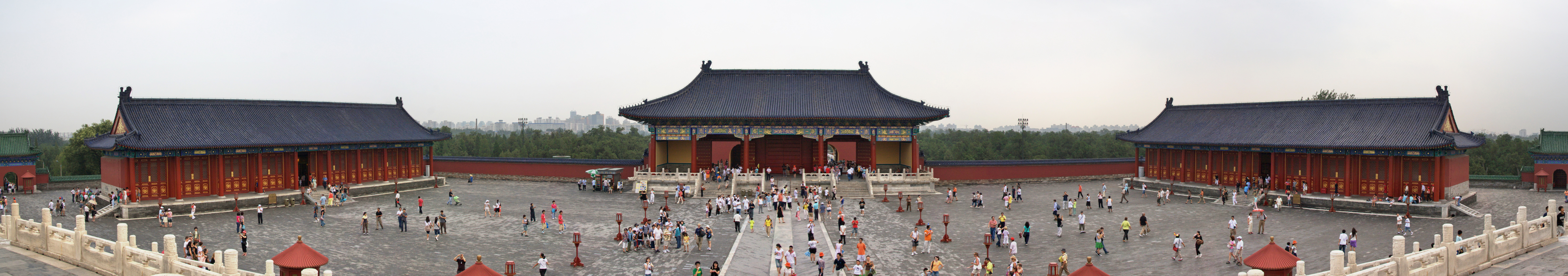
Panorama of the three main halls

== See also ==
- Nine Altars and Eight Temples
- Tian
- Heaven worship
- All Under Heaven
- Son of Heaven
- Esplanade of Sacrifice to the Heaven and Earth (Huế, Vietnam)
- Hwangudan (Seoul, South Korea)
