= Nine Altars and Eight Temples =

Set of prominent places of ritual and worship

The Nine Altars and Eight Temples refer to 17 sites in Beijing that played a significant roles in imperial ritual and worship under the Qing dynasty, some of them going back to earlier periods of the history of Beijing. As some of the altars are clustered in the same locations, the same ritual venues are occasionally referred to as only "Five Altars and Eight Temples".

== Nine Altars ==
The nine altars are the following:

- Circular Mound Altar (圜丘壇 huánqiūtán) within the Temple of Heaven, for sacrifices to Tian on the winter solstice
- Altar of the Sun (日壇 rìtán) outside the city walls east of Chaoyangmen, for worship of the sun on the March equinox
- Altar of the Earth (地壇 dìtán) also known as the Fangzetan (square water altar), outside the city walls north of Andingmen, for sacrifices on the summer solstice
- Altar of the Moon (月壇 yuètán), outside the city walls west of Fuchengmen, for worship on the September equinox
- Hall of Prayer for Good Harvests (祈年殿 qíniándiàn) north of the Circular Mound Altar within the Temple of Heaven, for worship on the first Xin day of the first lunar month
- Altar of Agriculture (先農壇 xiānnóngtán) in present-day Temple of Agriculture Park, for worship on the second day of the third month of spring
- Altar of Tai Sui (太歲壇 tàisuìtán) also in the Temple of Agriculture Park, for worship on auspicious days in the first ten days of the first lunar month and the last ten days of the twelfth lunar month
- Altar of the First Silkworm Goddess (先蠶壇 xiāncántán) in present-day Beihai Park, for worship of Leizu on the fourth day of the second month of spring
- Altar of Earth and Grain (社稷壇 shèjìtán) in present-day Zhongshan Park southwest of the Forbidden City

== Eight Temples ==
The eight temples are the following:

- Imperial Ancestral Temple (太廟 tàimiào) in present-day Working People's Cultural Palace southeast of the Forbidden City
- Hall of Ancestor Worship (奉先殿 fèngxiāndiàn) within the Forbidden City
- Hall of Transmission of the Heart (傳心殿 chuánxīndiàn) within the Forbidden City
- Hall of Longevity (壽皇殿 shòuhuángdiàn) in present-day Jingshan Park north of the Forbidden City
- Temple of Ancient Monarchs (歷代帝王廟 lìdàidìwángmiào) within the city walls west of the Imperial City
- Tangzi (堂子 tángzǐ), a shamanic ritual site of the House of Aisin-Gioro that stood on the location of present-day Beijing Hotel until demolition in the 20th century
- Palace of Peace and Harmony (雍和宮 yōnghégōng) also known as the Yonghe Temple or Beijing Lama Temple, Tibetan Buddhist complex within the city walls north of the Imperial City
- Temple of Confucius (孔廟 kǒngmiào) immediately west of the Lama Temple

== Gallery ==
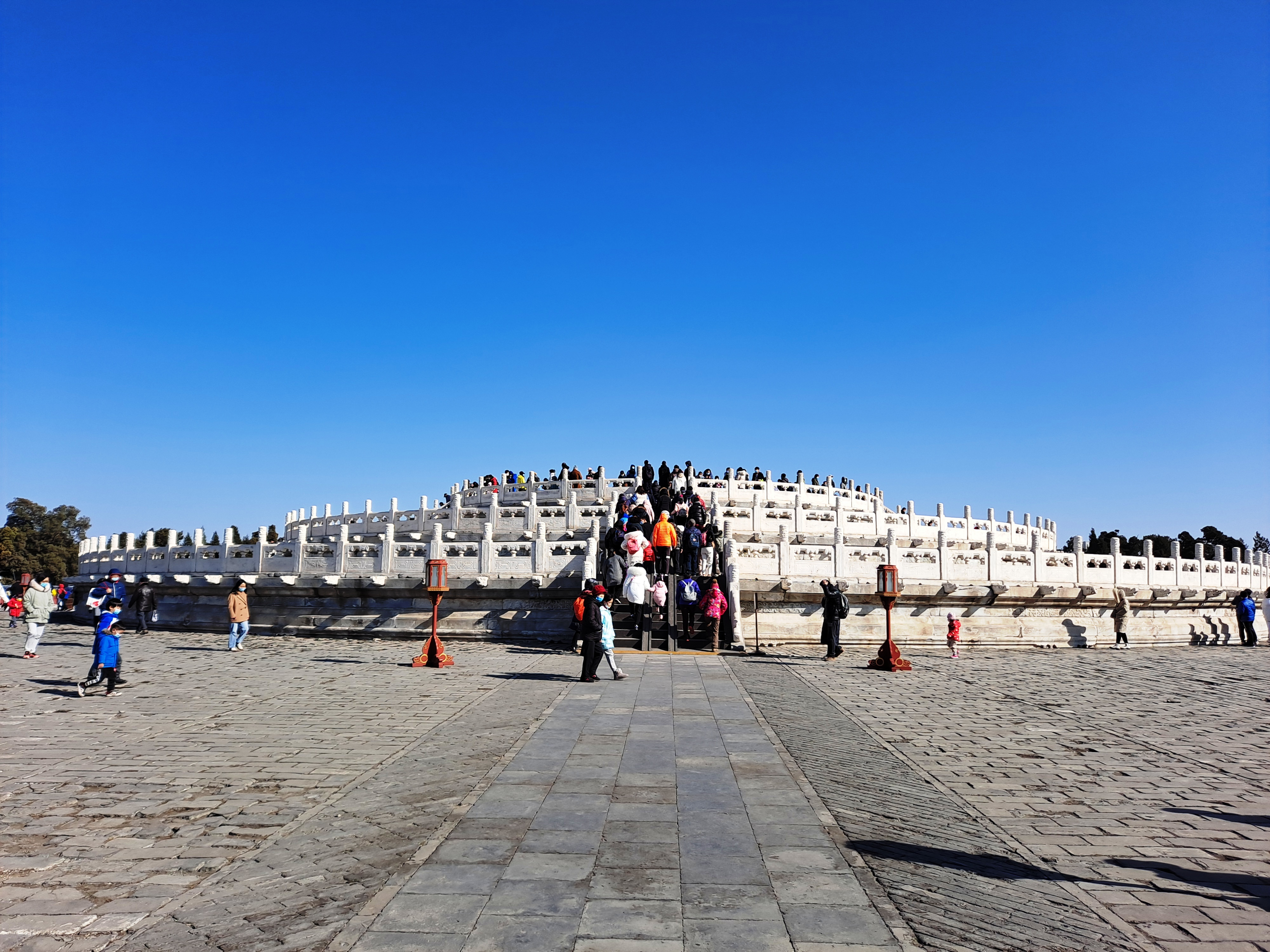
Circular altar of Heaven

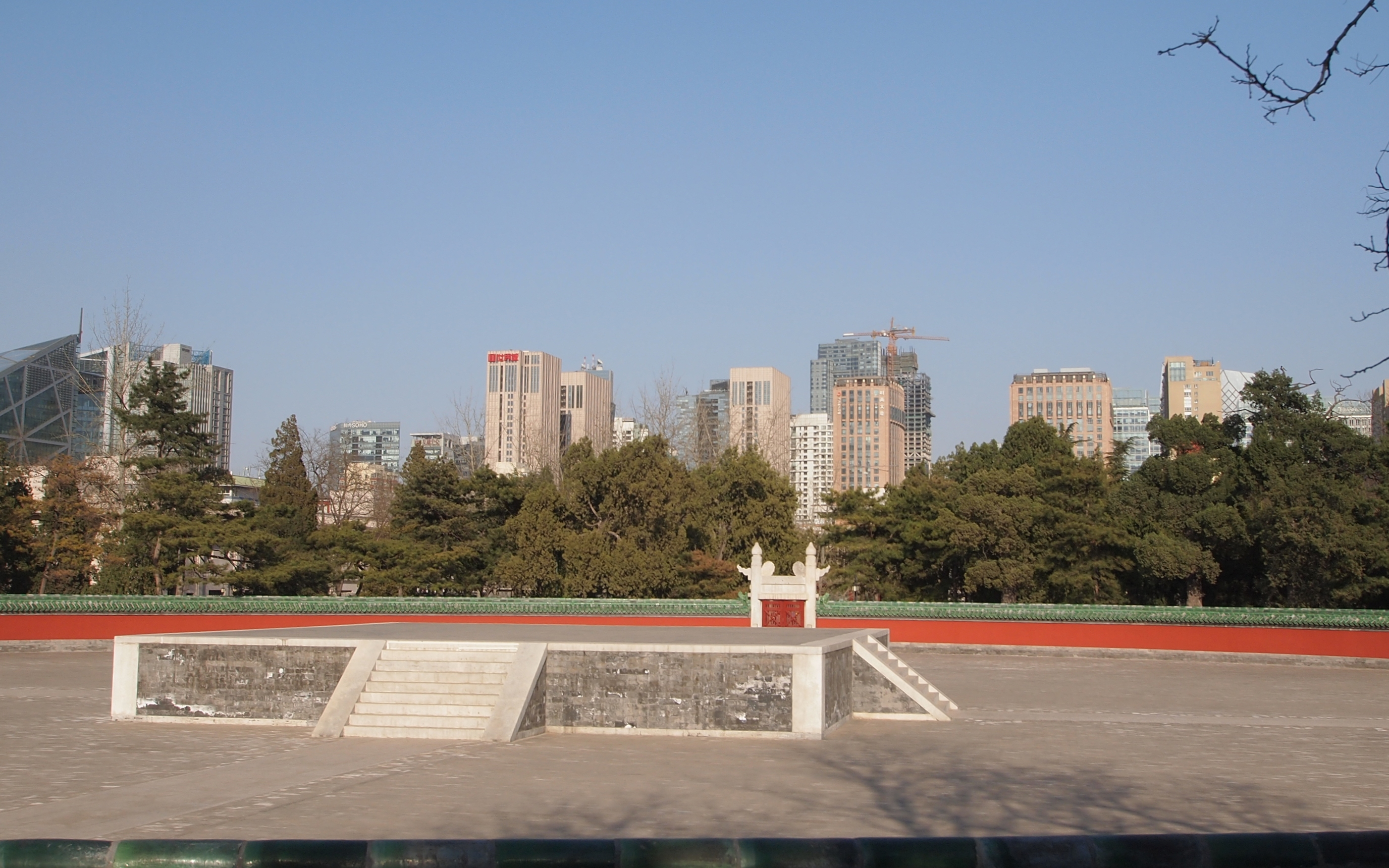
Altar of the Sun

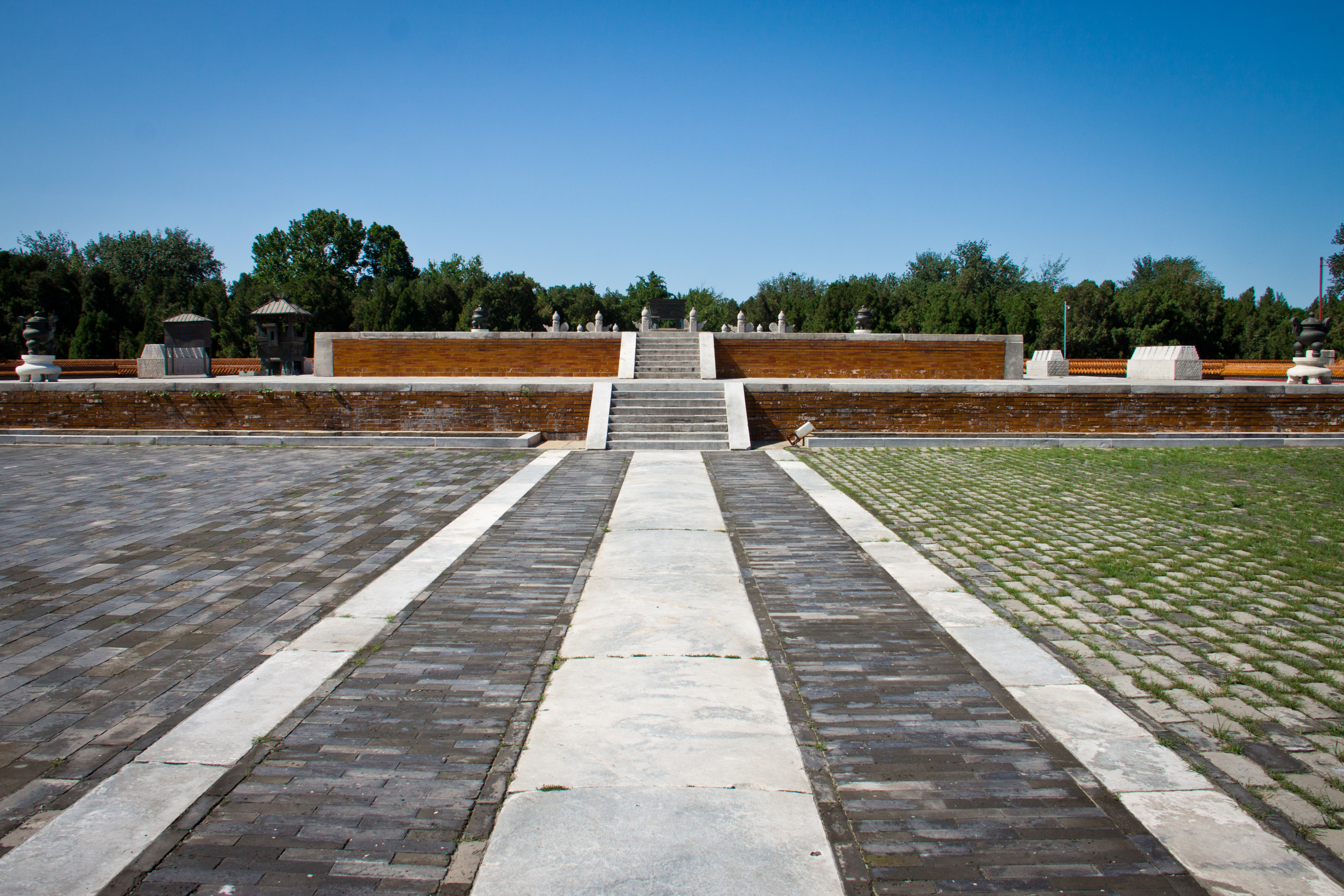
Altar of the Earth

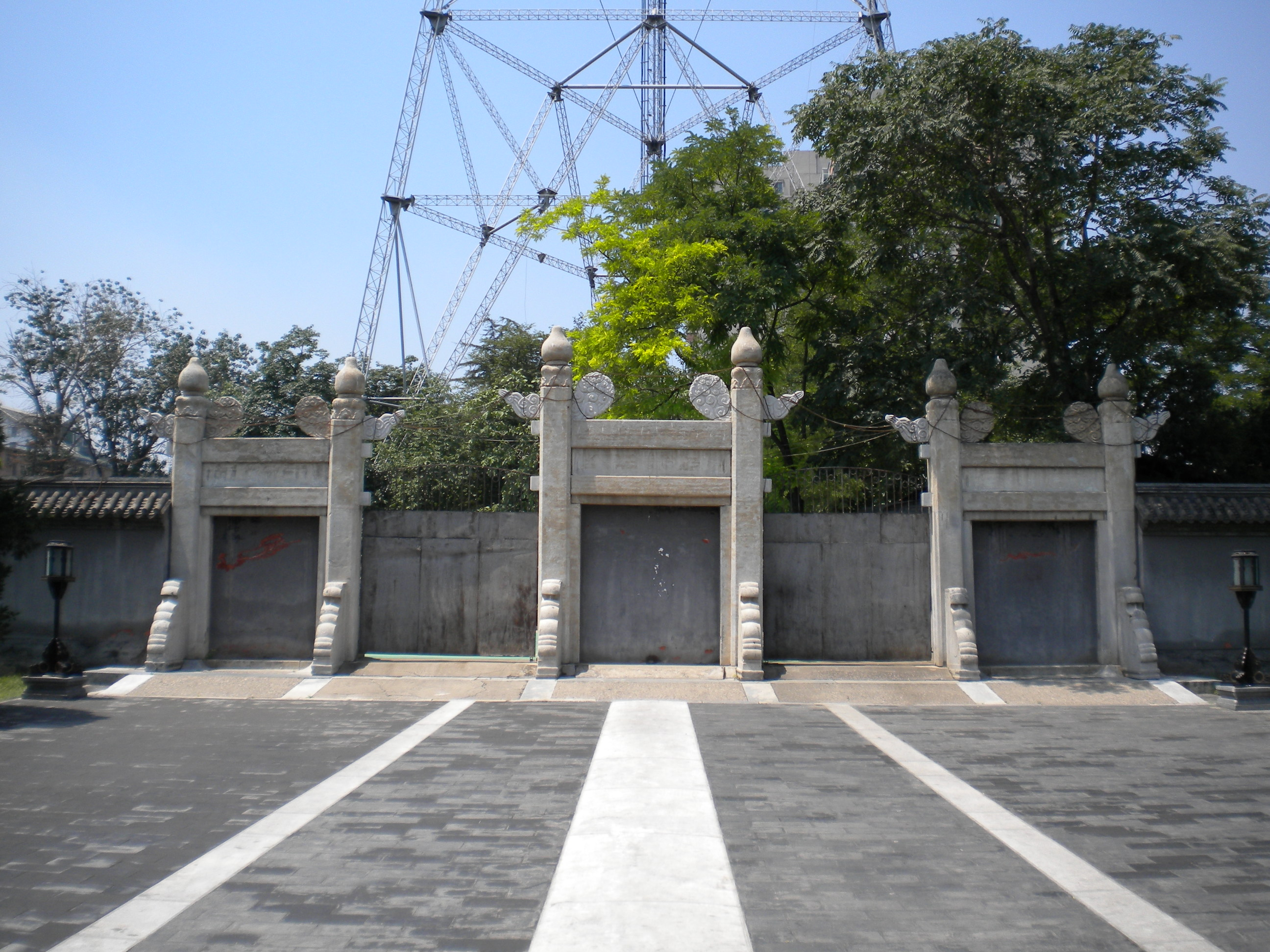
Gateways to the (demolished) altar of the Moon

Hall of Prayer for Good Harvests

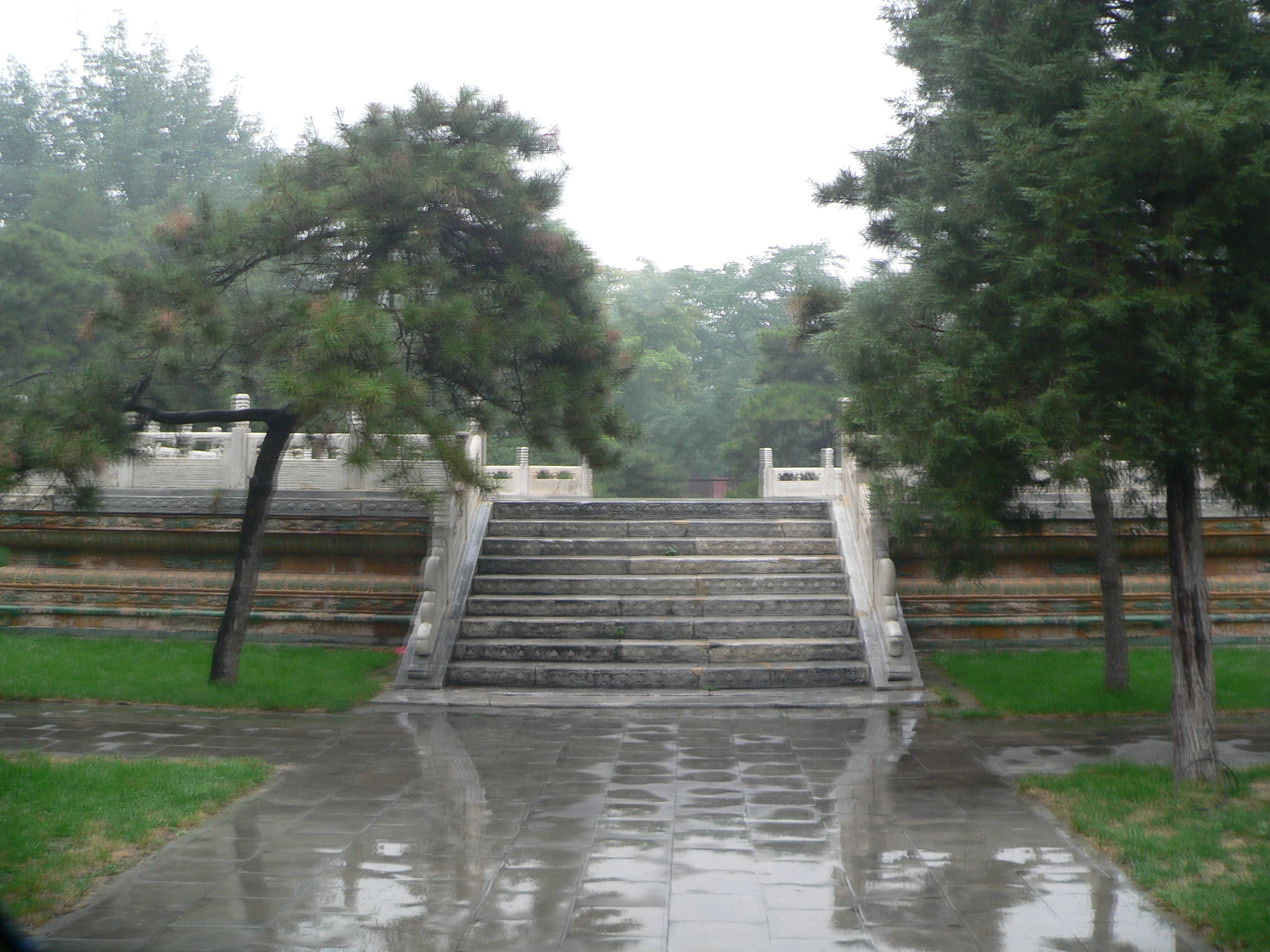
Altar of Agriculture

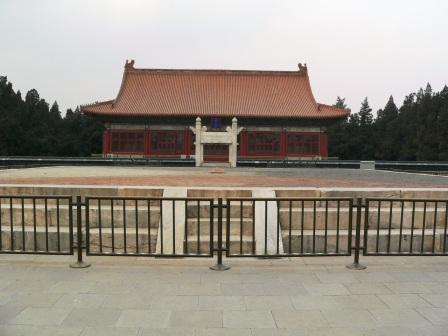
Altar of Earth and Grain

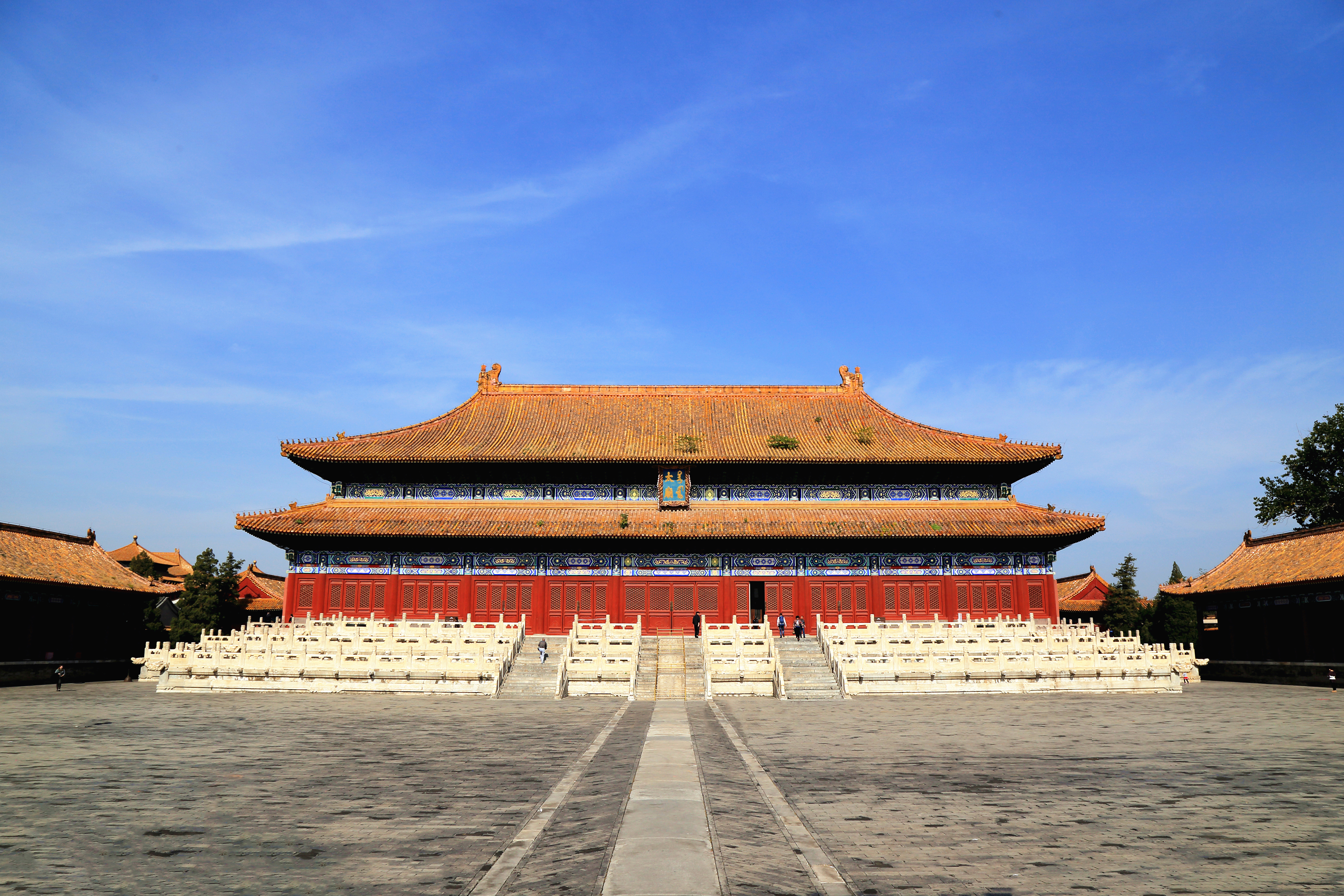
Imperial Ancestral Temple

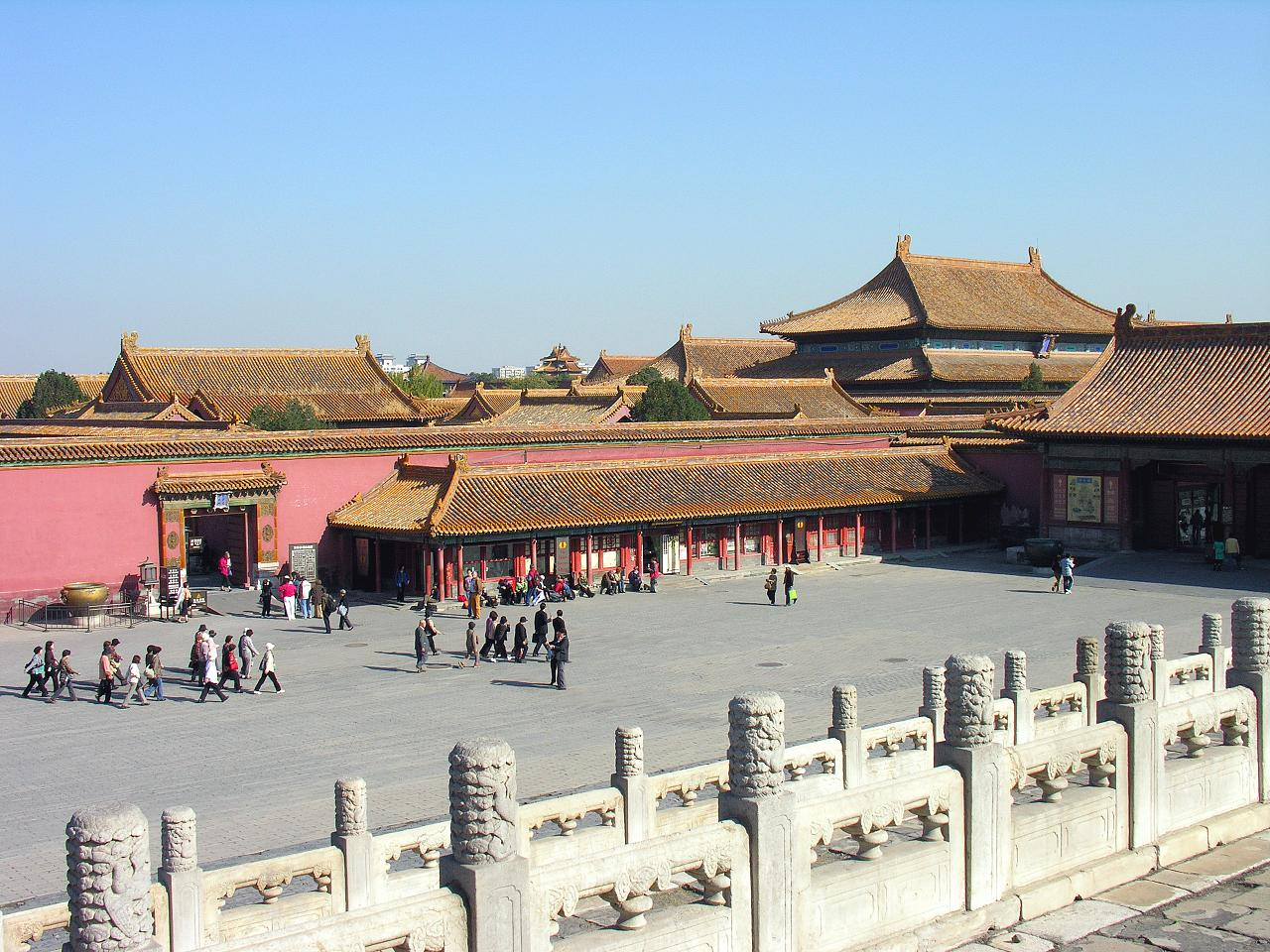
Hall of Ancestor Worship

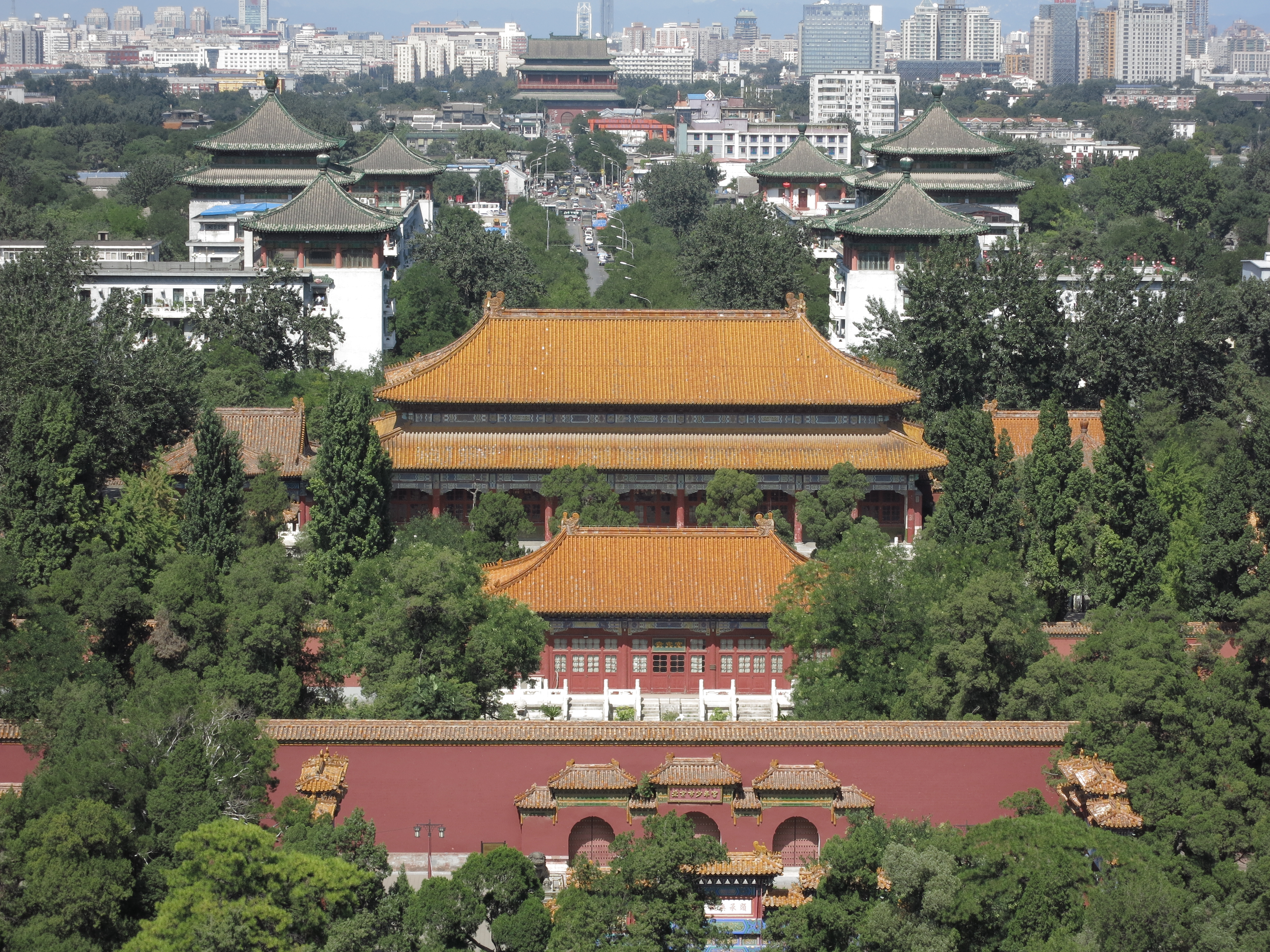
Hall of Longevity, Jingshan Park

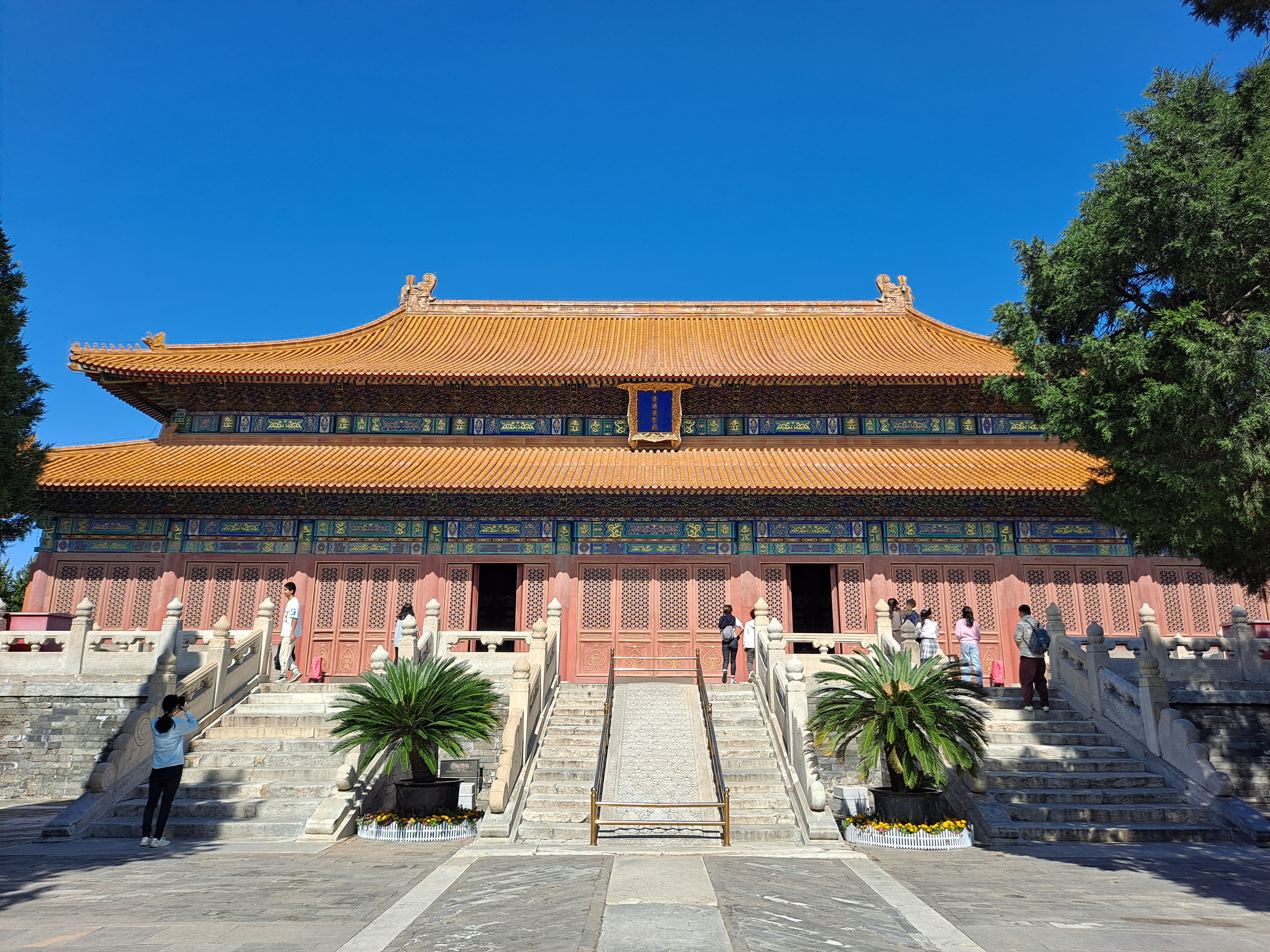
Temple of Ancient Monarchs

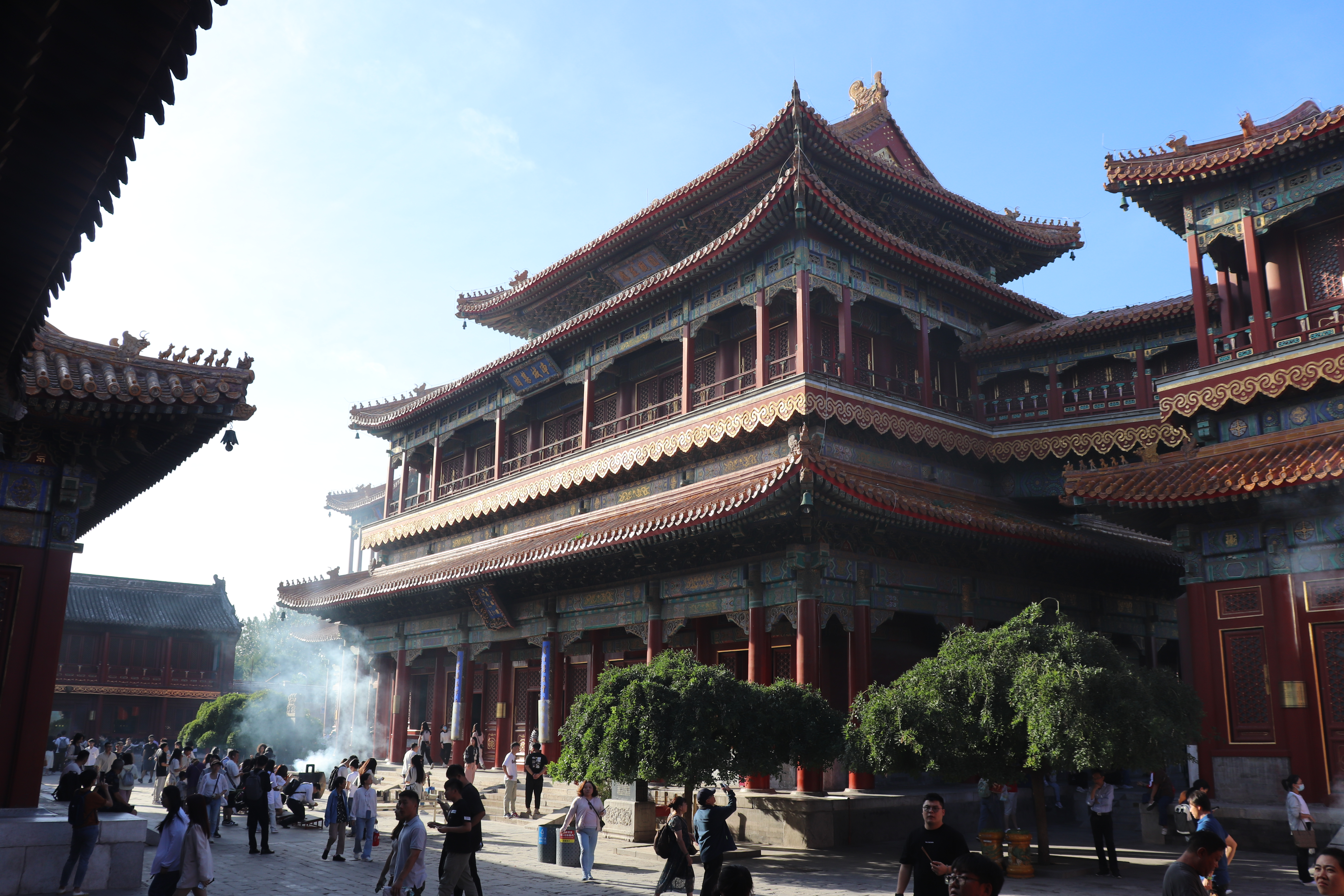
Palace of Peace and Harmony (Lama Temple)

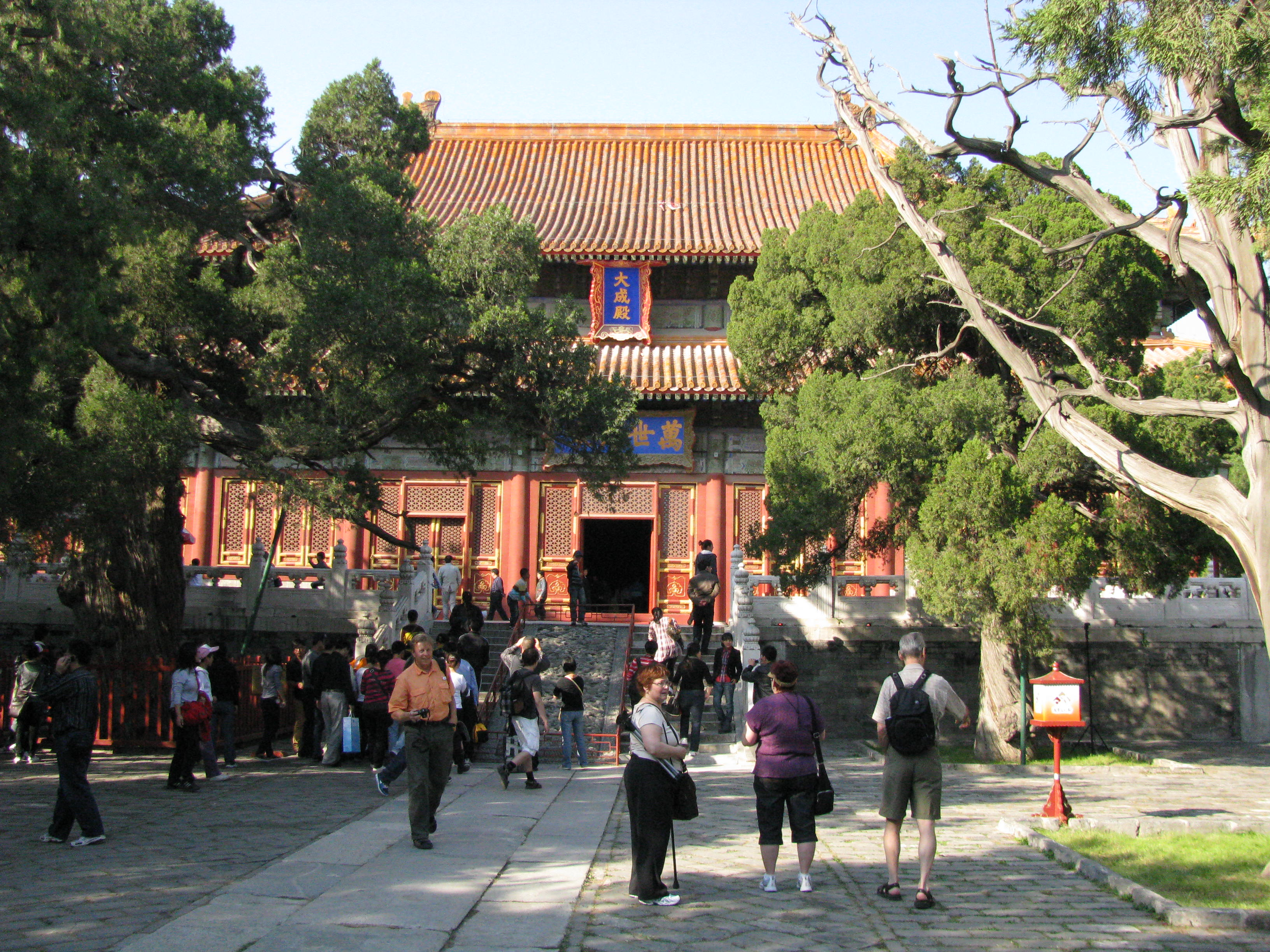
Temple of Confucius

== See also ==
- Ministry of Rites
- Court of Imperial Sacrifices
- China Millennium Monument
- List of Beijing landmarks
