= Circular Mound Altar =

Religious site in Beijing

Coordinates: 39°52′56.07″N 116°24′23.29″E

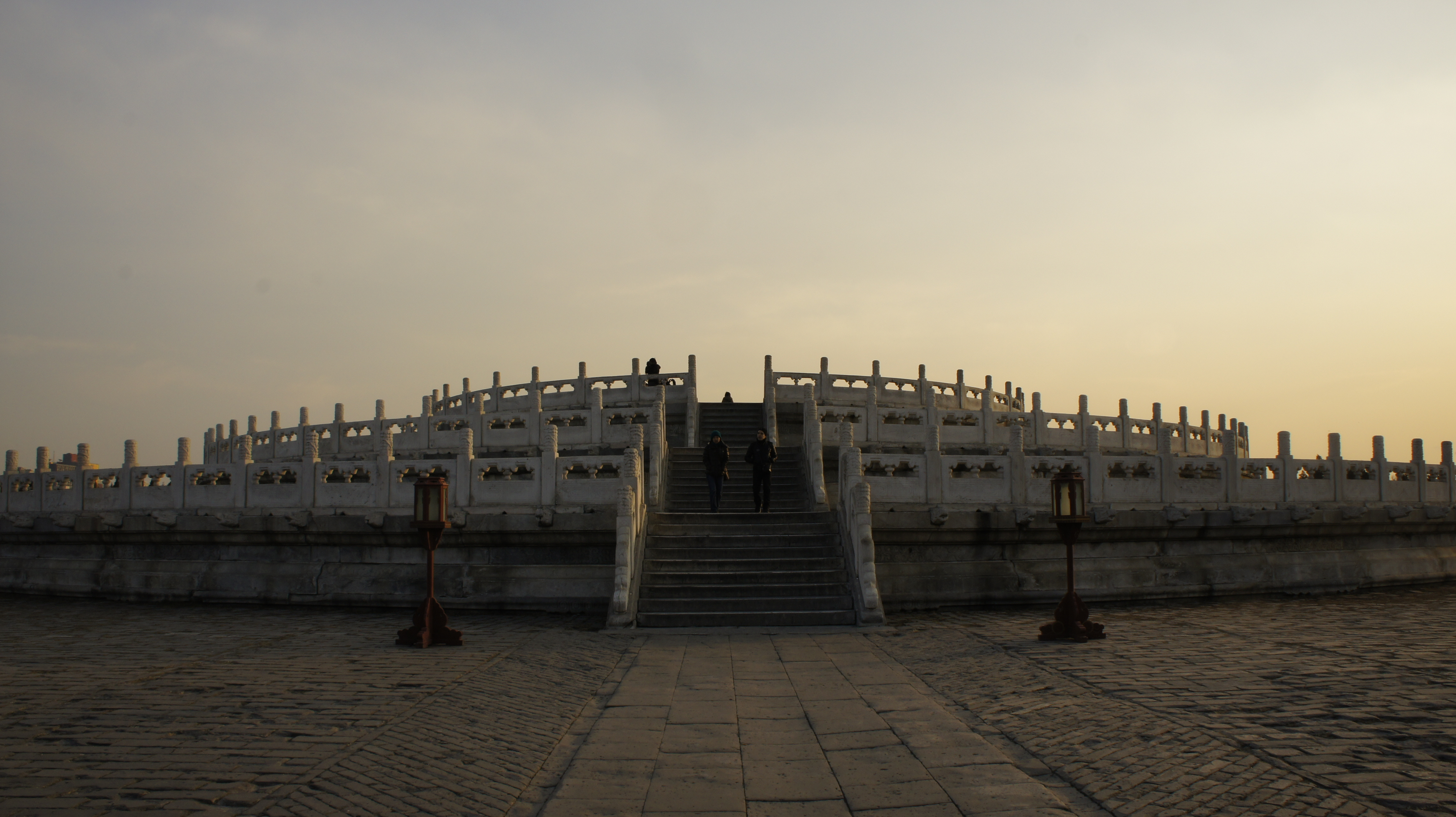
Circular Mound Altar

The Circular Mound Altar (Chinese: 圜丘坛; pinyin: Huánqiū Tán) is an outdoor empty circular platform on three levels of marble stones, located in Beijing, China. It is part of the Temple of Heaven.

It was constructed in 1530, during the 9th year of the Jiajing Emperor's reign in the Ming dynasty, and enlarged in 1749 (the 14th year of the Qianlong Emperor's reign in the Qing dynasty). The round terrace was first covered with deep blue glazed slabs surrounded with a white marble balustrade when it was expanded. It has a circular perimeter of 534 m and a height of 5.2 m.

This altar was also built for religious purposes, especially for ceremonies to pray for rain by the emperor in times of drought. During the Ming and Qing dynasties (1368–1911 AD), the emperors would offer sacrifices to Heaven on the day of the Winter Solstice every year. Sacrificial animals and other offerings were burned here to ensure good harvests. A common animal slaughtered here was the bull, which the people would set on fire as a sacrifice of prosperity. This ceremony was to thank Heaven and pray that everything would be good in the future.

== Special features ==
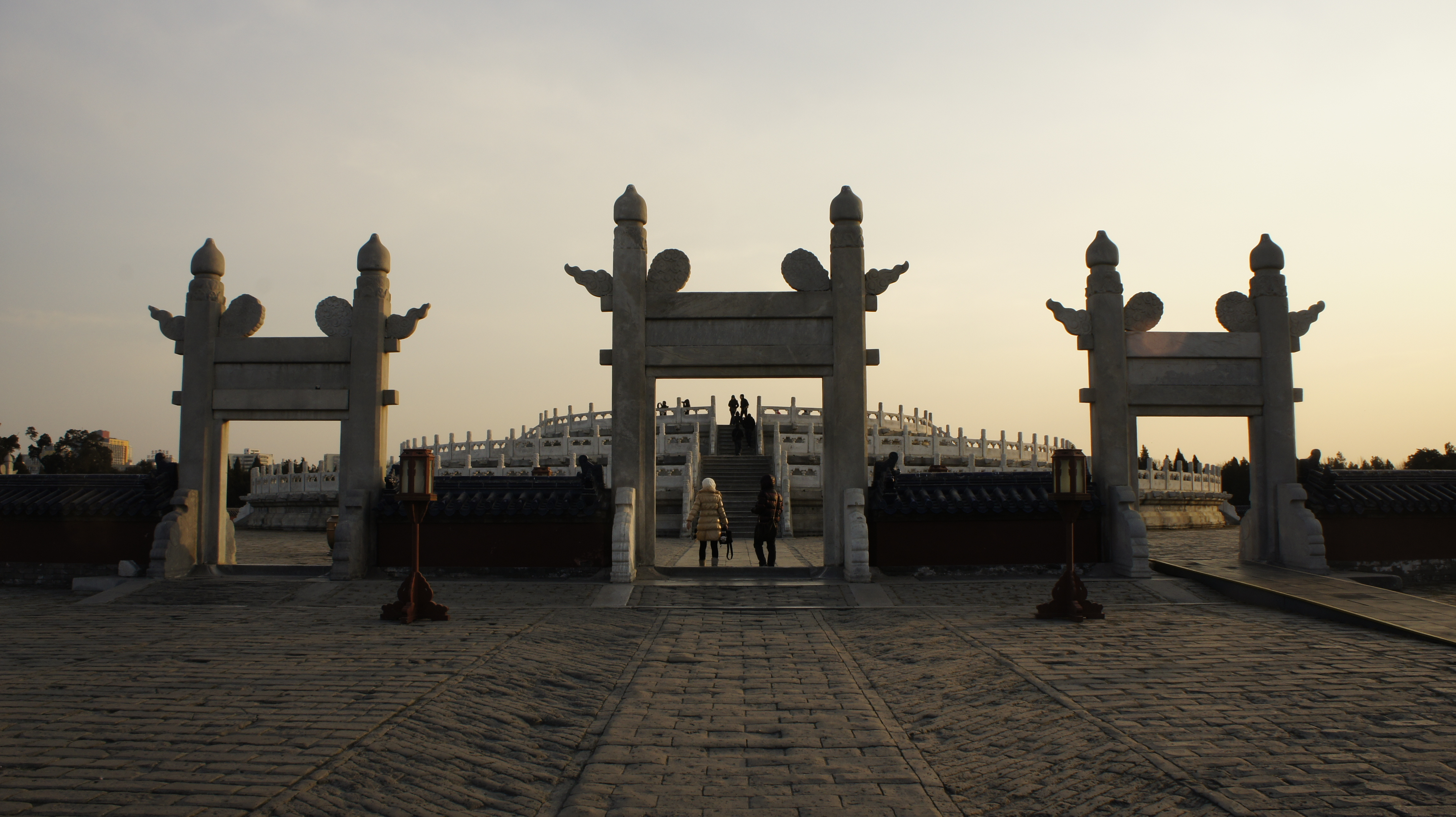
Lingxing Gate of the Circular Mound Altar

Each wall represents something different. The round inner wall represents heaven while the square outer wall represents earth, according to Chinese beliefs and traditions. The three round white marble terraces that make up the altar represents communication with heaven.

The Circular Mound Altar is special in the sense that the architecture of the place circulates around the number 9. To understand why the people of China back then chose the number 9, we must look at the concept Yin-Yang. In Yin-Yang, Yin represents the even numbers and Yang represents the odd numbers. 9, being the largest 1-digit odd number, is considered "extremely yang". This number represents the Chinese Dragon, and the dragon represents the emperor. 9 is also said to symbolize the "9 circles of heaven".

The number of pillars in each section is a multiple of 9. When we multiply this number by 4 to get the number of pillars for the whole circle, it would still be a multiple of 9. Also, the number of stone slates each wall is made of in the first terrace is 9.

Each terrace has 9 slates. The top layer has 72 slates, the middle layer has 108 slates, and the bottom layer has 180 slates. All together there are 360 slates. This is similar to 360°, which is a circle and thus represents the circumference of heaven.

In the centre of the upper terrace is the Heaven's Heart Stone which is surrounded by concentrically arranged flag-stones. There are 9 stones in the first circle, 18 in the second, 27 in the third. It continues in this manner up to the ninth circle, which has 81 stones. The middle and bottom terraces also have 9 circles each. The total number of the marble flagstones on the surface is 3,402.

Each terrace has four entrances and a flight of nine steps leading down in every direction. These nine steps represent the nine layers of heaven and emphasize heaven's extreme importance.

The diameter of the altar is a total of 450 ft. This is linked to jiǔwǔ zhīzūn (九五之尊) as 45 = 9 × 5. The arrangement of putting number nine and five together is used exclusively in China by the ancient emperors as they represent imperial authority.

== Voice amplification ==
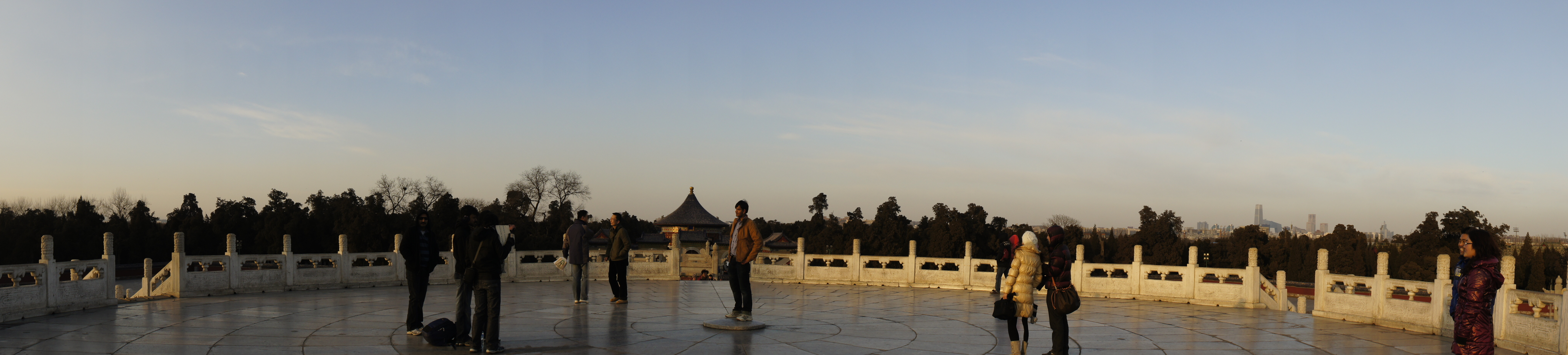
Panorama of the Circular Mound Altar

There is a special result of the architectural form of the Circular Mound Altar which can be explained through the religious ceremonies performed there. The boulders on the top terrace amplify the voice as one whispers through it. When the emperor stands in the center of the top terrace, on top of the central stone and performs the ceremony to pray for rain, his voice would become loud, like the heaven oracle. When coupled with the solemn ritual performed by a group of Chinese monks, the atmosphere is given a more mysterious effect as the sounds generated gradually increase in volume.

The cause of this effect is the extreme smoothness of the altar's walls and floor, causing sound waves in all directions to spread quickly to the stone balustrades and get reflected back. Scientists have calculated the time taken for this process to be only a mere 0.07 seconds, showing that this process is almost instantaneous. Due to this process, an echo is created, thus resulting in the volume of the emperor's voice being nearly doubled. This effect is important as it symbolizes that the emperor's voice would reach heaven.

The altar has withstood the test of time for nearly 500 years and still stands perfectly preserved without any cracking or sagging. The building is still in this good condition probably because it was renovated during 1749. This is most likely because of the high durability of the materials used to build this piece of architecture. The walls are now layered with marble and the rest of the altar consists of the initial material used for construction, blue-stone. Marble is an important material to use as it helps to create the echo used to amplify sound due to its extremely smooth surface.

== See also ==
- Nine Altars and Eight Temples
- China Millennium Monument
