= Ritan (island) =

Island in Indonesia

- Interactive map of Ritan

Geography
- Location: Natuna Sea
- Coordinates: 2°36′43.56″N 106°16′38.82″E
- Adjacent to: Natuna Sea
- Area: 052 km^{2} (20 sq mi)

Administration
- Indonesia
- Province: Riau Islands
- Regency: Anambas Islands
- District: South Siantan

Ritan Island is a small island (also known as Mala) located in the Anambas Islands Regency, in the Riau Islands Province of Indonesia. The island was in the spotlight because it appeared on a foreign property trading site, although it was later clarified that what happened was a land sale by an Indonesian citizen.

== Geography ==
Ritan Island is part of the Anambas archipelago in the South China Sea. The island covers an area of approximately 52 hectares and is situated behind Pulau Kiabu within the South Siantan District.

== Land Ownership ==
In 2022, several parcels of land on Pulau Ritan were sold by local residents to Indonesian citizens residing in Bali. These transactions were legally certified with Right to Build (Hak Guna Bangunan /HGB) titles issued by the Ministry of Agrarian Affairs and Spatial Planning/National Land Agency of Anambas Regency.

== Land Sale Controversy ==
There have been online claims alleging that Ritan island was being sold in its entirety. However, local authorities have clarified that these claims are misleading. What occurred was a legal sale of land plots by local residents to fellow Indonesian nationals, not a wholesale sale of the island.

== Zoning and Land Use ==
According to the Regional Spatial Plan of the Anambas Islands Regency, Ritan island is designated as a tourism area.
