= Ritan (Beijing) =

Public park in Beijing, China

Ritan Park
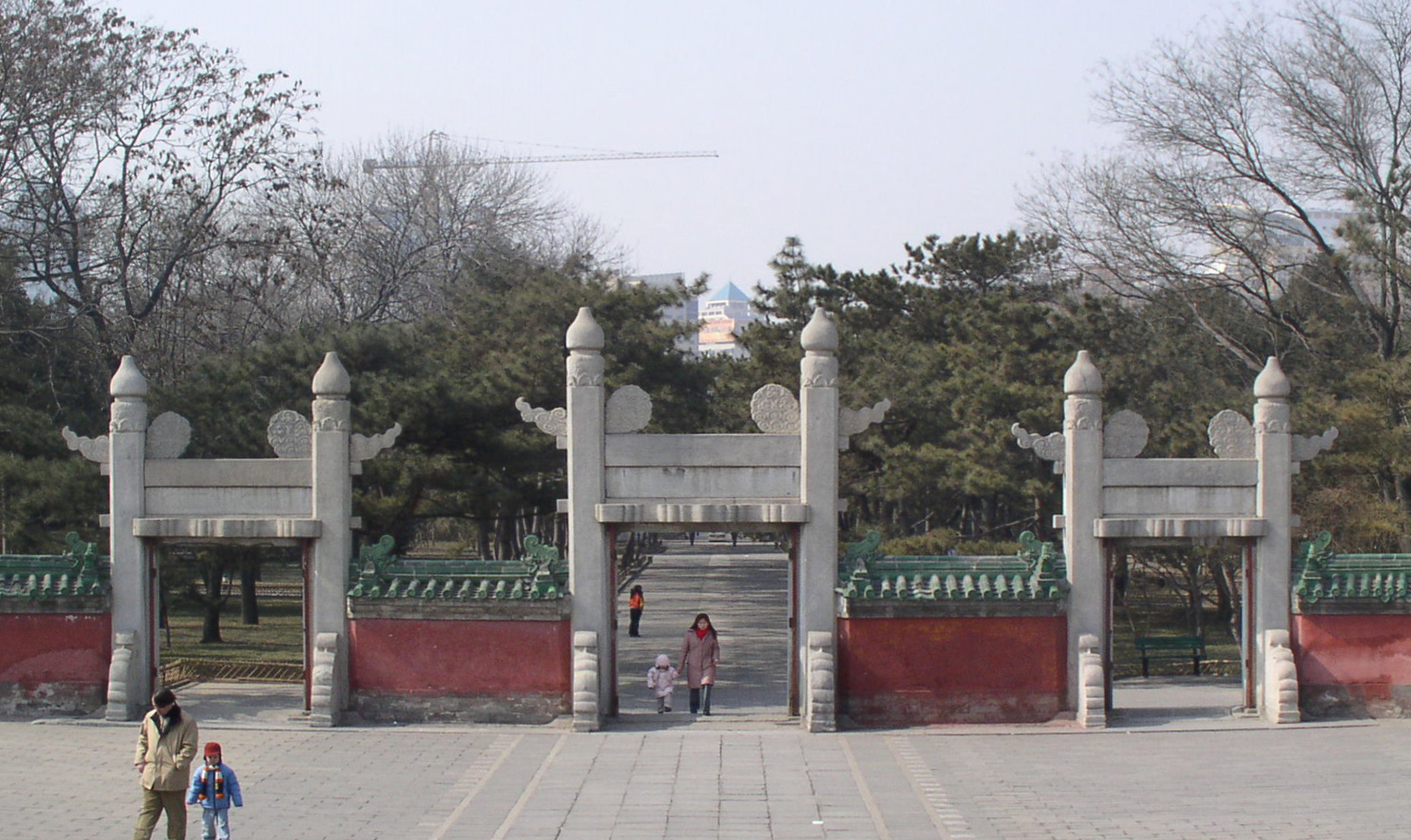
- The "Star Gates" that mark the boundary of the altar

- Location within Beijing Location within China
- Type: public park
- Location: Chaoyang District, Beijing, China
- Coordinates: 39°54′51.9″N 116°26′17.2″E
- Created: 1530
- Owner: Beijing Municipal Administration Center of Parks
- Status: Open all year

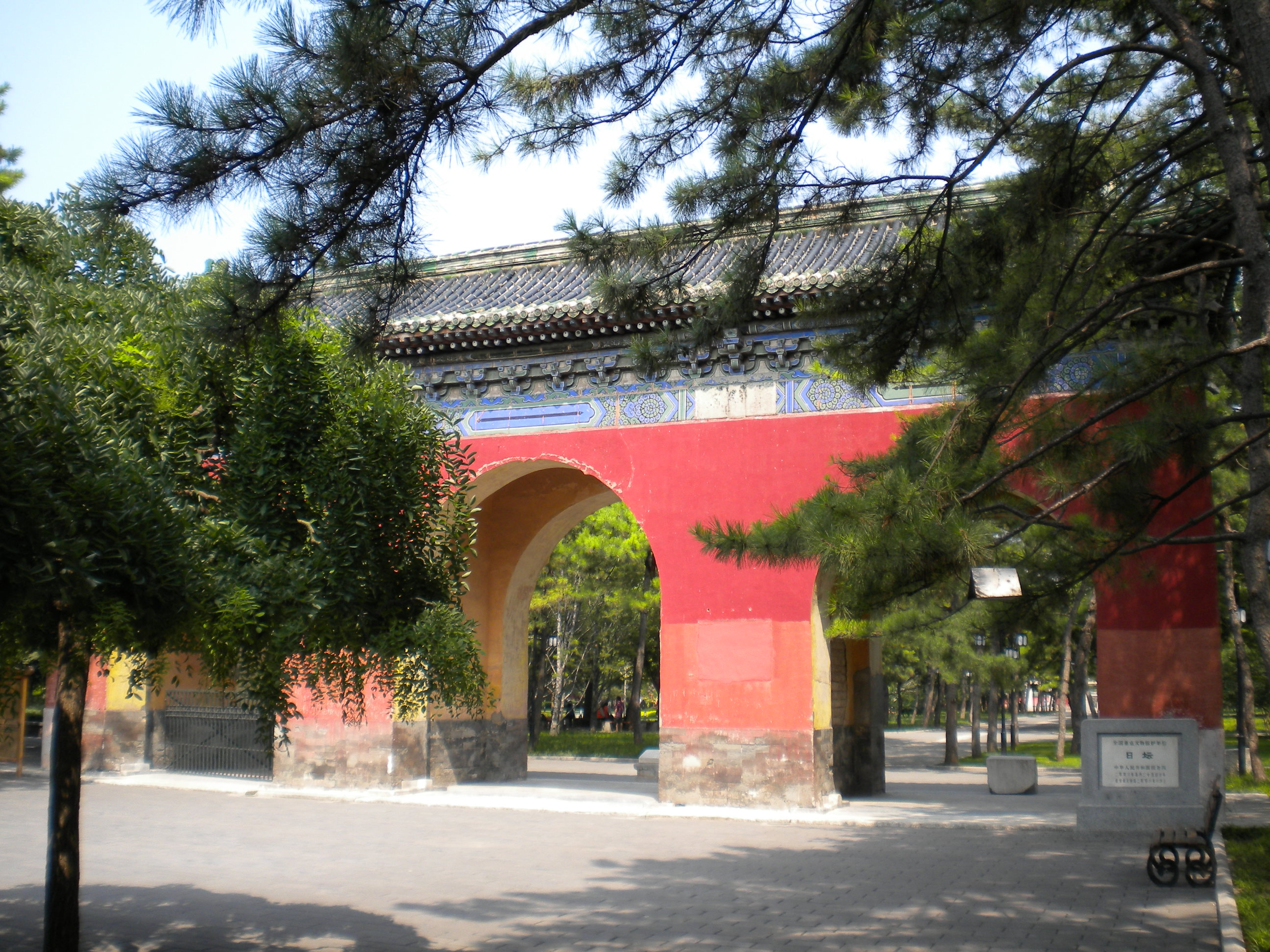
The West Holy Gate

The Ritan is a public park located in Chaoyang District, Beijing, China. It is within the Jianguomen area. The nearest Beijing Subway station is Yong'anli on the Beijing subway Line 1. The park was initially home to the Temple of the Sun (simplified Chinese: 日坛; traditional Chinese: 日壇; pinyin: Rìtán), an altar built in 1530 during the late Ming Dynasty.

== History ==
The altar was built in 1530 during the late Ming Dynasty for use in ritual sacrifice to the sun by the Emperor of China. The original Altar of the sun was a rectangular white-stone dais covered with red glaze, and four stairways (north, east, south and west) with nine steps measuring 18.3 yards (16.7 m) in width and length, and 7 feet (2.1 m) in height. The temple had been destroyed and restored to reopen in 1556 to the public.

Upon entering the premises, the emperors would pass through the Heavenly West Gate and along the Sacred Way that led to the sun altar.

The temple was abandoned in 1911. Its park was renamed Ritan (or Ri Tan) Park in 1949 and reopened in 1951. In the 1970s, the Ritan Park became part of the embassy district of the city. In the 1980s, the park was restored and expanded southwards with the Quchi Shengchun garden (or Yuxin garden), and the Sun Mural was installed in the park to commemorate the opening policies of Deng Xiaoping and the end of Maoist policies.

During the 2008 Summer Olympics, it was selected as one of the three protest zones.

== Description ==
The area surrounding the Ritan temple is now a public park, and the site features extensive gardens and a small lake. On the opposite side of Beijing, to the west, is the Temple of the Moon, located in Fuchengmen. There is a Sino-Japanese Friendship Monument in the park, but it is hard to spot and not well indicated.

The Shen Ku and Shen Chu is the place where the tablets of the temple were found. The Qinghui pavilion is the high point with a panoramic view of the park. Below the pavilion is a pond with rockies, a café (the Stone Boat café), much lotus... Many people visit the park in the morning to practice tai chi or other forms of physical or spiritual exercises.

The park is free of charge and open 24 hours a day. Restaurants and snacks are available inside the park.

== See also ==
- Nine Altars and Eight Temples
