= Temple of the Moon (China) =

Temple in Beijing, China

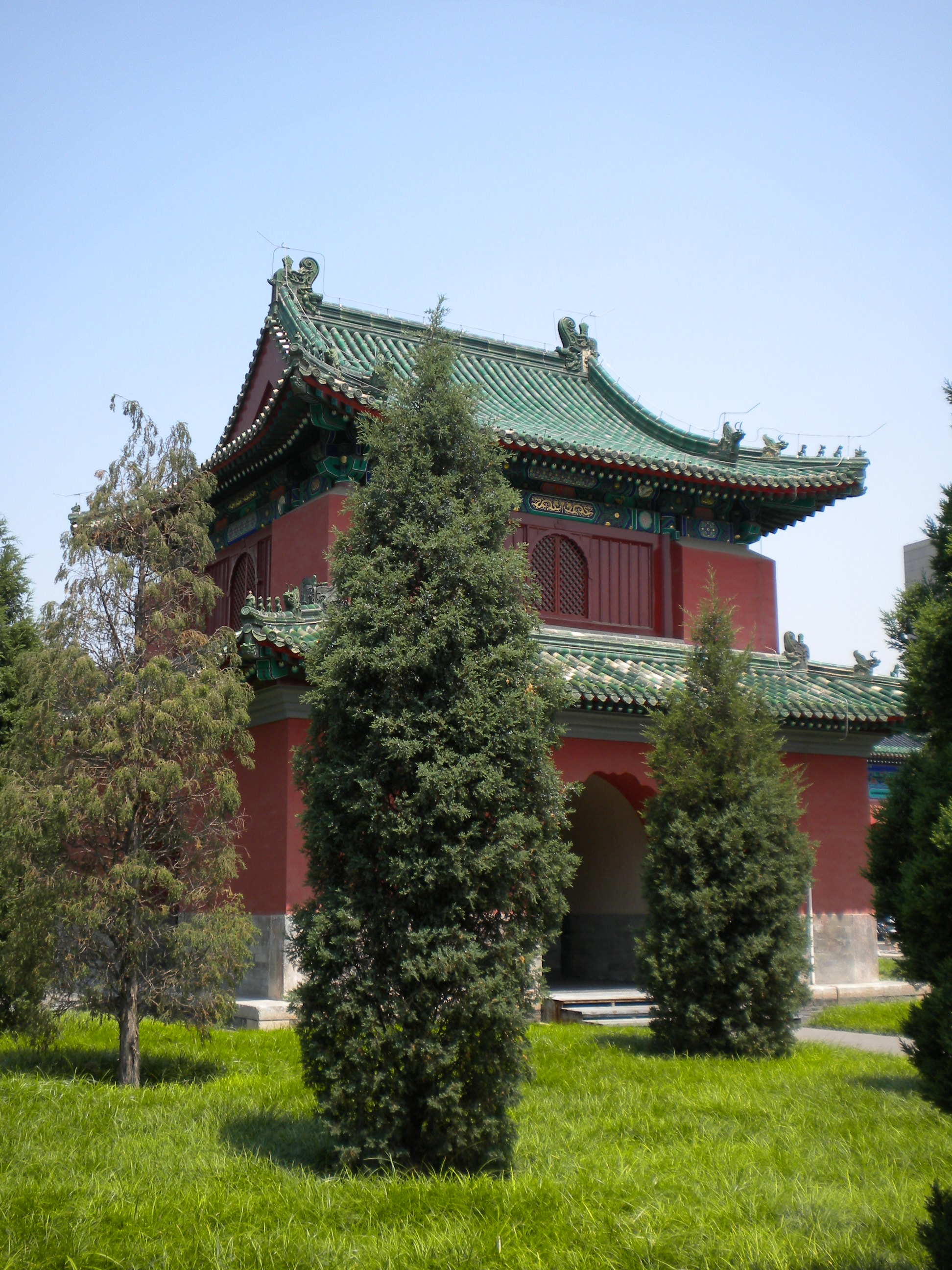
- The Bell Tower inside the Temple of the Moon

- Location within China
- 39°54′57″N 116°20′46″E
- Type: Altar
- Location: Beijing

History
- Built: 1530

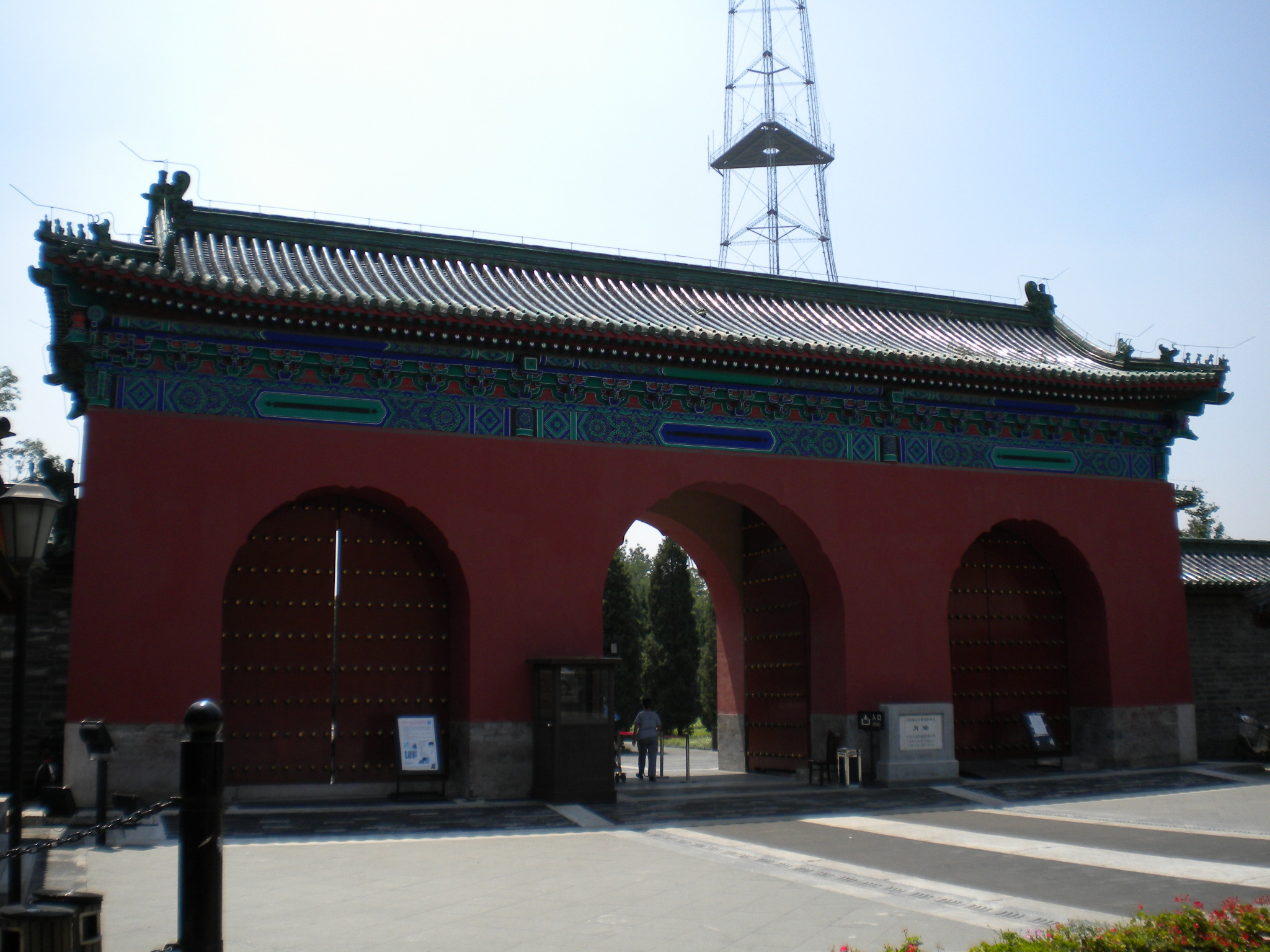
The North Holy Gate

The Temple of the Moon (traditional Chinese: 月壇; simplified Chinese: 月坛; pinyin: Yuètán) is an altar located in Fuchengmen, Xicheng District, in western Beijing, China. The altar was built in 1530 during the Ming Dynasty for use in ritual sacrifice to the Moon by the Emperor of China.

The altar and the surrounding grounds are within a public park. The altar itself is no longer intact, though the surrounding walls remain.

== See also ==
- Nine Altars and Eight Temples
