= Huashi, Beijing =

Neighborhood in Beijing, China

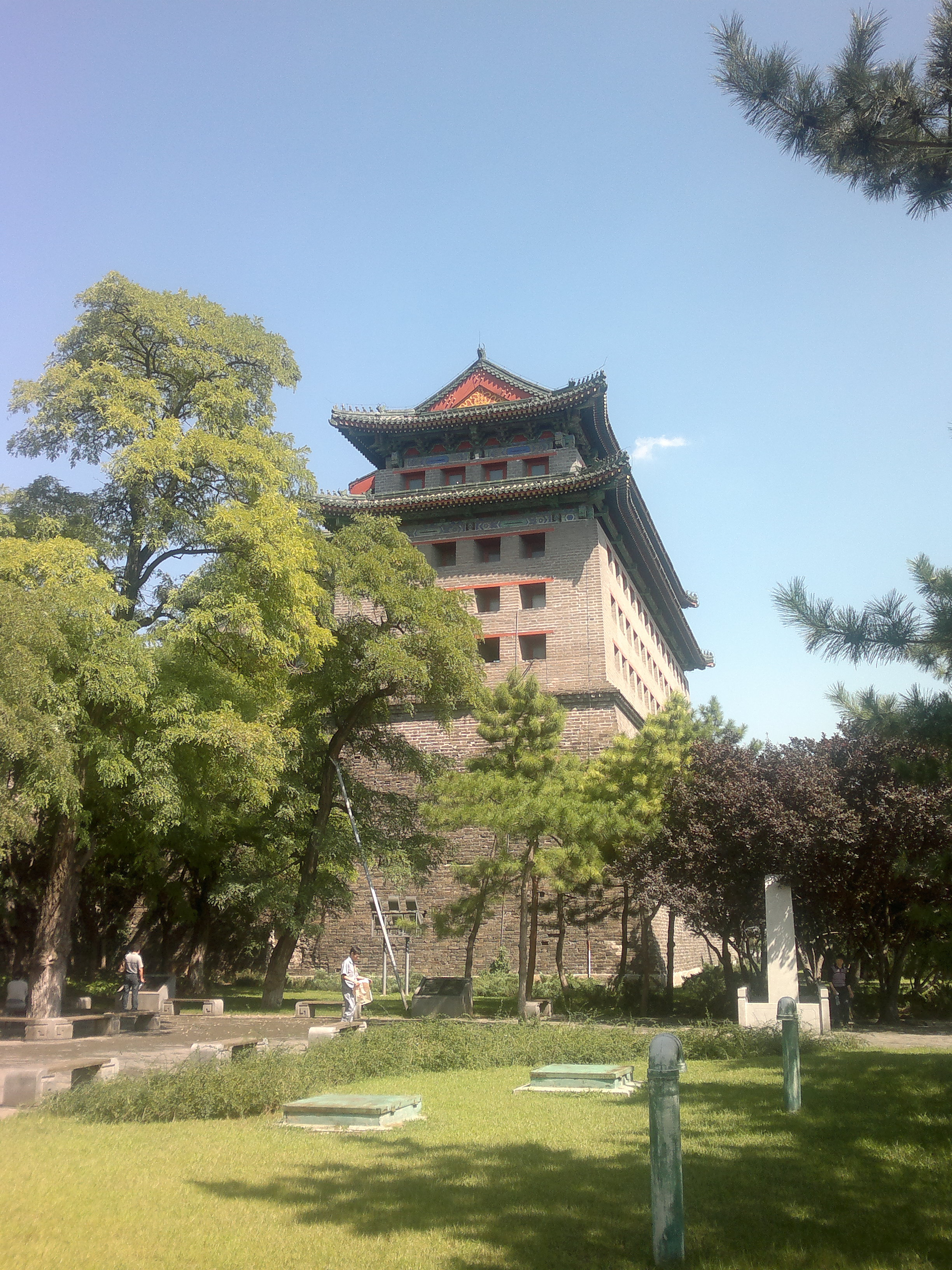
The Southeast Corner Tower and Beijing's inner city wall mark the northern boundary of the Huashi neighborhood.

Huashi (Chinese: 花市; pinyin: huāshì), colloquially known as Huarshi and literally the "Flower Market", is a predominantly residential neighborhood to the south of Chongwenmen and Dongbianmen, in Dongcheng, Beijing. Huashi was known during imperial times for its markets for fresh and handmade flowers and was for centuries, one of Beijing's notable Hui Muslim quarters.

== Location and administration ==
=== Location ===
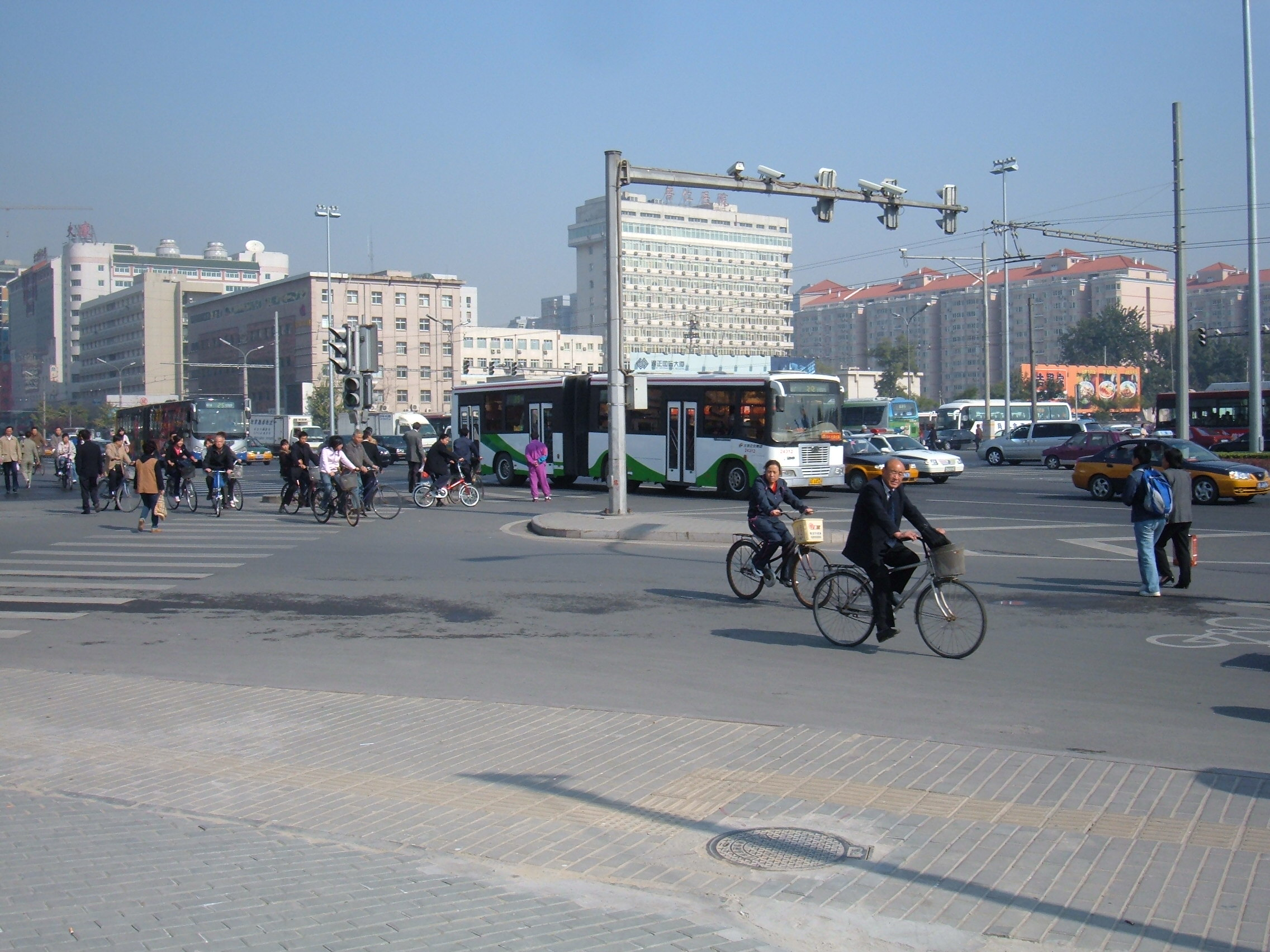
The Ciqikou intersection at the southwest corner of Huashi where the Chongwenmen Outer Street crosses Zhushikou East Street / Guangqumen Inner Street. To the right of Puren Hospital, the tall white building, are the condominiums of Xinjing Homeland, part of the Xinjing Residential Community.

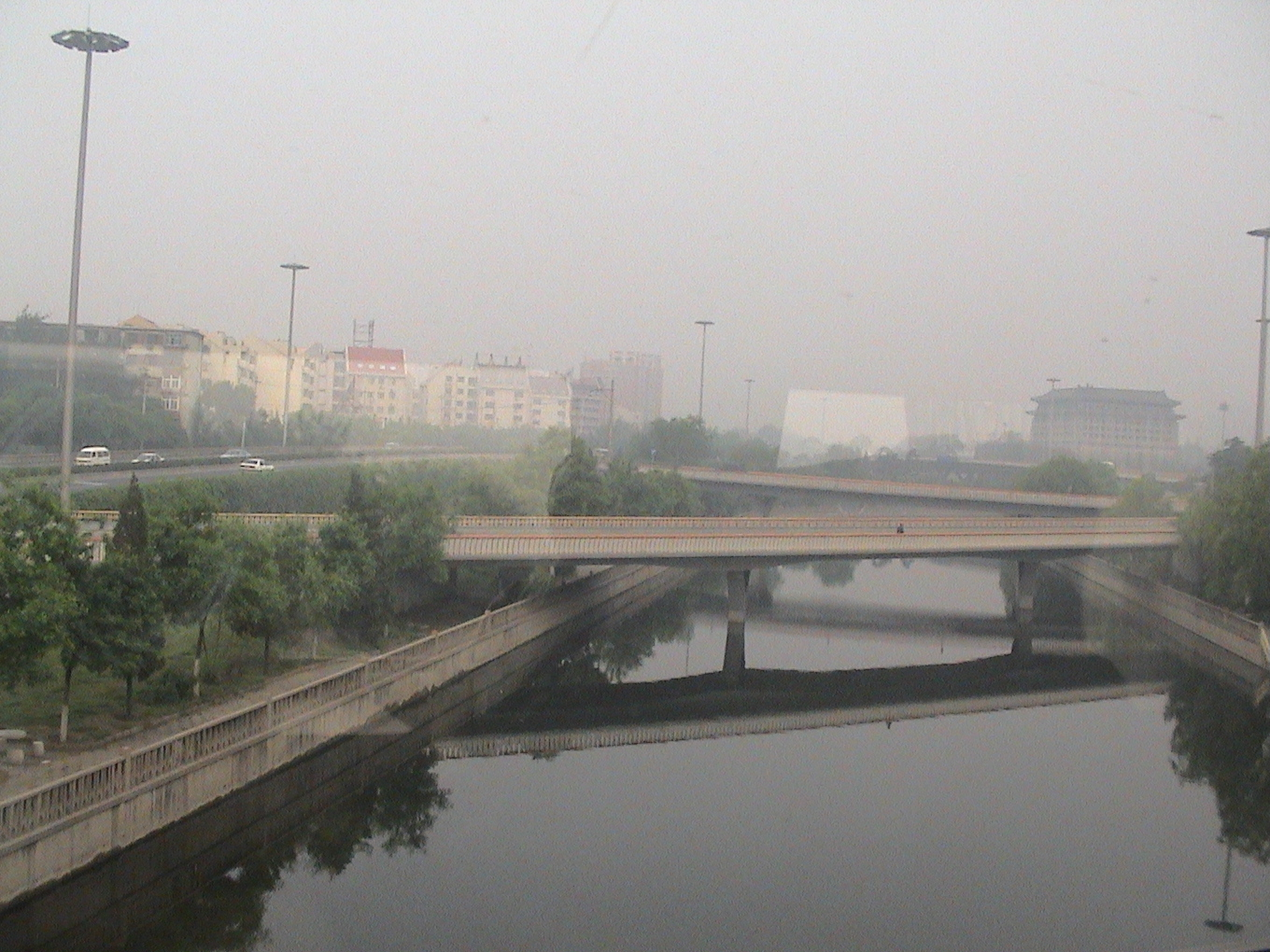
At Dongbianmen, the apartment blocks of Hubeikou, part of the East Huashi Beili East Residential Community in northeastern Huashi, is visible from the Beijing-Shanhaiguan Railway. The Second Ring Road and the city wall moat are in the foreground and the Southeast Corner Tower is to the right.

Huashi is located southeast of Chongwenmen inside the Second Ring Road in central Beijing. The neighborhood is bound by the Ming City Wall Relics Park to the north, by Chongwenmen Outer Street to the west, by the Second Ring Road and Beijing-Shanhaiguan Railway to the east and by Guangqumen Inner Street to the south.

Huashi Street, the historic main street of the neighborhood, runs the length of the neighborhood (1.7 km (1.1 mi)) from west to east. The neighborhood is divided into East Huashi and West Huashi by Huashi North and South Street. The intersection at Xiaoshikou, or the Little Market Intersection, marks the heart of neighborhood.

=== Administration ===
East Huashi, which accounts for two-thirds of the neighborhood, is governed by the East Huashi Subdistrict. West Huashi, the western third of the neighborhood, which contains the Glory Mall, is administered by the Chongwenmen Outer Subdistrict, whose jurisdiction includes other malls south of Chongwenmen. In all, the Huashi neighborhood contains 14 residential communities.

==== West Huashi ====
West Huashi is home to nine of the 12 residential communities in the Chongwen Outer Subdistrict:

1. Chongwenmen East Street
2. West Huashi Nanli East
3. West Huashi Nanli West
4. West Huashi Nanli South
5. Xinjing Estate
6. Guoruicheng West
7. Guoruicheng Central
8. Guoruicheng South

==== East Huashi ====
East Huashi is home to five of the eight residential communities in the East Huashi Subdistrict:

1. East Huashi Beili West
2. East Huashi Beili East
3. Huashi Zaoyuan
4. East Huashi Nanli
5. East Huashi Nanli East

== History ==
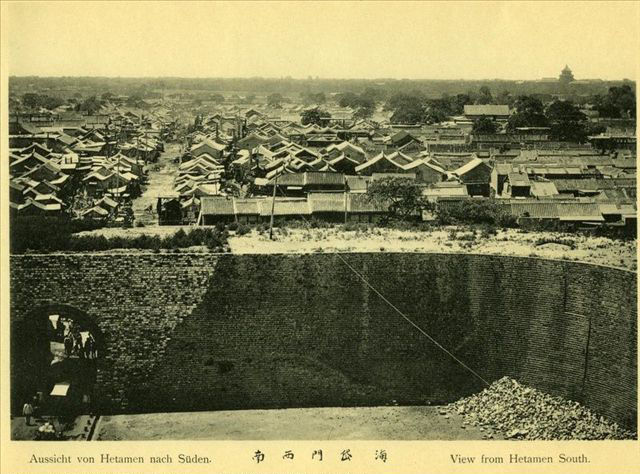
The hutong neighborhoods south of Chongwenmen in the early 1900s. The Huashi neighborhood is to the far left, east of Chongwenmen Outer Street from the city gate. The Temple of Heaven is visible to the far right.

The Saturn Peach Festival at Huashi

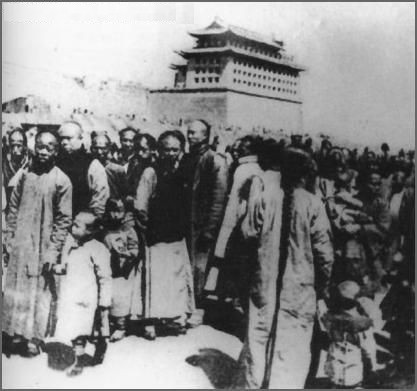
For centuries, the Saturn Peach Festival was celebrated with a temple fair at the Queen Mother's Saturn Peach Palace in Huashi, near the Southeast Corner Tower. Though the temple was destroyed in the 1950s, the festival continues to be held annually in the nearby Ming City Wall Relics Park. Above: The festival during the late Qing dynasty.

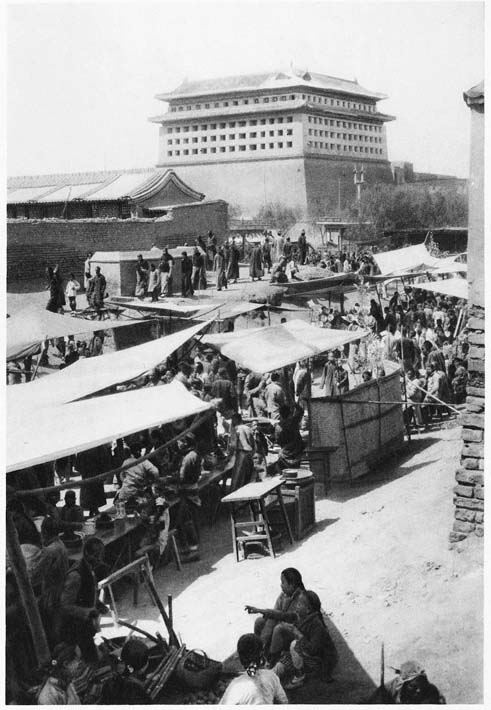
The festival in 1929.

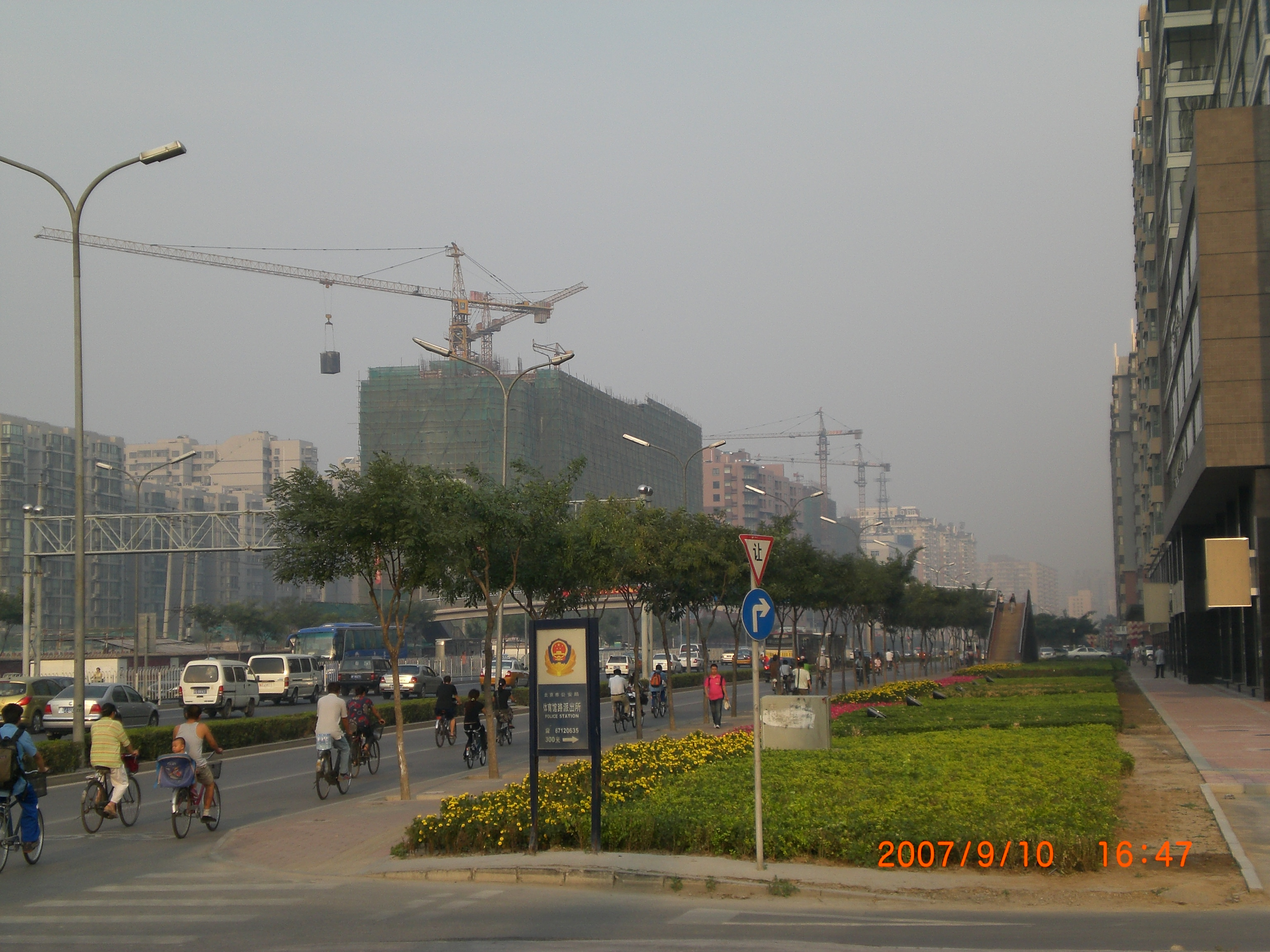
Apartment towers under construction in 2007 along Guangqumen Inner Street, which marks the southern boundary of Huashi.

In the Yuan dynasty, the vicinity of what is now Huashi was a scenic area of lush meadows and gardens just outside the city of Dadu. In 1422, an imperial lumber shop called the Sacred Wood Factory opened to process logs shipped from Sichuan to build palaces of the Ming dynasty. In 1553, when the neighborhood was enclosed by the outer city wall, there were already 322 shops in the area.

By the mid-Qing dynasty, Huashi was teeming with craftshops, especially those making artificial flowers. Handmade flowers from cloth and silk were popular adornment for ladies' head dress and fashion. Locally made flowers were sold to nationally and won a gold prize at the Panama–Pacific International Exposition of 1915. In addition to artificial flowers, Huashi was also known for fresh cut flowers and saplings.

Huashi was a religiously diverse neighborhood with the Buddhist Long'an Temple, Daoist Fire God, Kitchen God and Saturn Peach Temple, Huashi Mosque, and Huashi Methodist Church. The Saturn Peach Temple was razed in the 1950s. The Huashi Church, built in 1905 by the American Methodist Episcopal Mission, which also opened the Tongren Hospital and Huiwen Middle School, was converted into a depot in the 1950s and then became a pool hall before it was demolished in November 2004. The Kitchen God Temple became a school for Hui Muslim children in 1943. The Fire God and Long'an Temples, which were converted, respectively, into a library and a science center, have been preserved as historical landmarks. Only the Huashi Mosque remains an active house of worship.

Until the 1980s, Huashi was a traditional neighborhood with narrow lanes, courtyard homes and streets lined with small shops. The lanes running east–west were called tiao numbered while those running north–south were called hutongs. In the 1990s, much of the traditional residences in East Huashi were razed and replaced with mid-rise residential apartment buildings.

Baorunyuan (宝润苑), built on North Huashi Street in 1998, was one of the first luxury apartment high-rises in Beijing with duplex suites and underground parking. In 1999, Shantou-based developer Zhang Zhangsun built the upscale Fuguiyuan (富贵园) condominium complex in East Huashi, which became one of the top ten best-selling real estate projects in Beijing. He followed suit in West Huashi, with the vast Glory Mall and sprawling Glory City (国瑞城) condominiums in 2003. Other high-rise residential complexes in Huashi include Flower Market Zaoyuan (花市枣苑) and Xinjing Homeland (新景花园). By 2007 only a few historically significant traditional buildings remain standing amidst the forest of mid- and high-rise apartment towers in Huashi.

From 1950 to 2011, Huashi was part of Beijing's Chongwen District until Chongwen merged with Dongcheng District.

== Neighborhood institutions ==
- Huashi Mosque, at No. 30 Huashi Street near Xiaoshikou, is the spiritual home of the local Hui Muslim community. The mosque was founded in 1415 in the early Ming dynasty, possibly by Hui generals Chang Yuchun or Hu Dahai. The mosque compound occupies an area of 2,000 m^{2} (22,000 sq ft), including a main hall of 1,000 m^{2} (11,000 sq ft) that can accommodate 1,000 worshippers. Among relics housed in the Huashi Mosque are gifts of calligraphy from the Kangxi, Yongzheng and Qianlong emperors of the Qing dynasty.
- Long'an Temple at No. 1 Baiqiao Nanli, originally built in 1454, and rebuilt in 1609 and 1708, was one of the largest Chinese Buddhist temples in Beijing's outer city. Active worship at the temple ended in the late Qing dynasty. In 1952, the temple was converted to the Long'an Temple Primary School and in 1983 became a children's science center, now known as the Dongcheng District Chongwen Children's Technology Center. The temple complex, nearly 10,000 m^{2} (110,000 sq ft), is a protected historical landmark. The temple grounds has stone steles, the oldest of which date to the reign of the Jingtai Emperor and two trees over 500 years old.

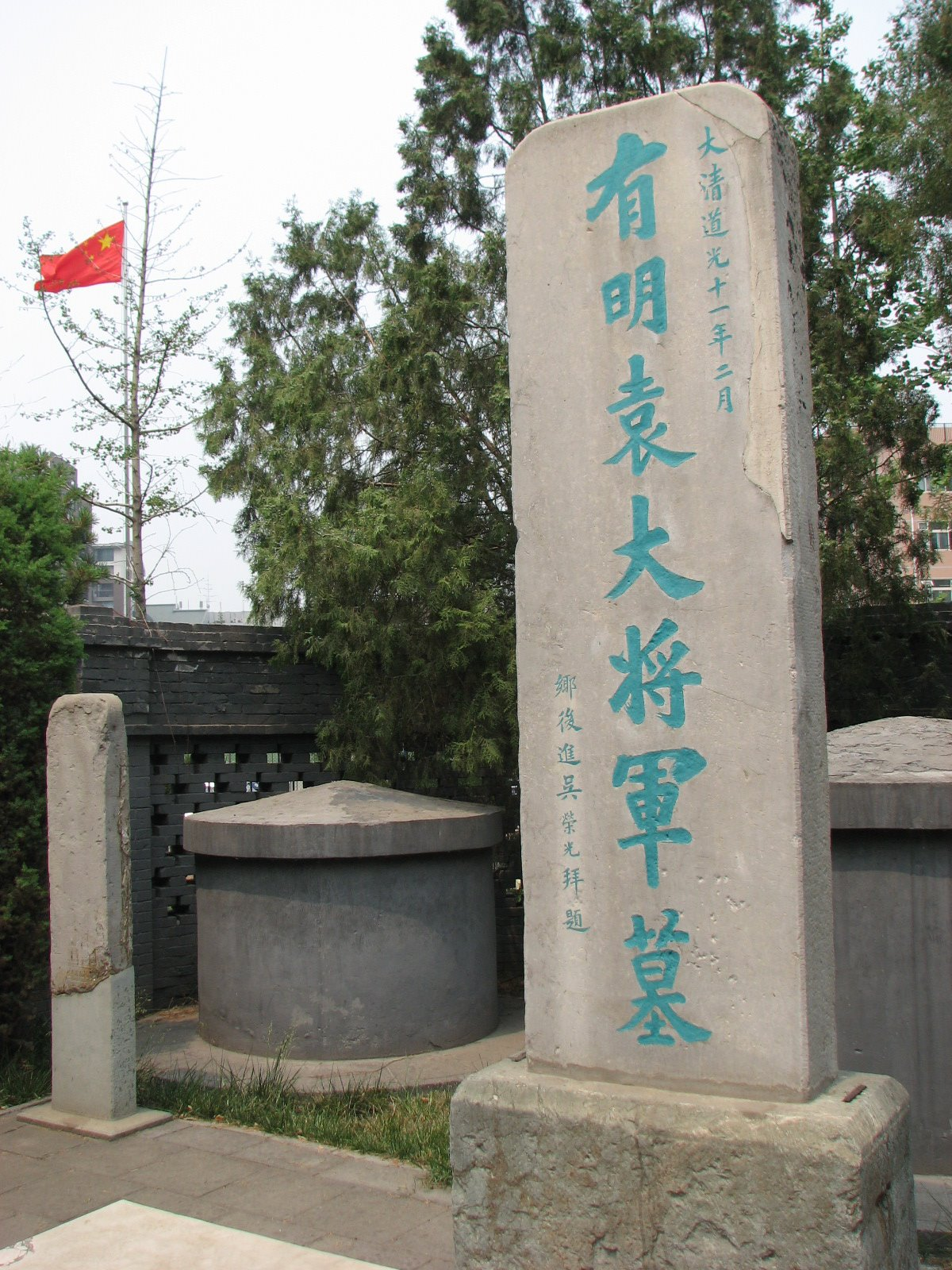
Tomb of Ming general Yuan Chonghuan in East Huashi.

- Tomb of Yuan Chonghuan at No. 52 East Huashi Diagonal Street, is a temple and tomb honoring the Ming dynasty general Yuan Chonghuan who repeatedly repelled Manchu invasions only to fall prey to a treacherous plot and was executed by the Chongzhen Emperor as a traitor. He was secretly buried on the grounds in 1630 and was rehabilitated by the Qianlong Emperor in the 18th century. The tomb was renovated in 1952 at the direction of Mao Zedong, ransacked during the Cultural Revolution, and restored in 1992.
- Daoist Fire God Temple, at No. 20 Huashi Street, was founded in 1568, and rebuilt in 1776. During the Qing dynasty, the temple hosted weekly temple festivals.
- Queen Mother's Saturn Peach Festival is a Daoist festival held during the third lunar month to celebrate the birthday of the Queen Mother of the West. The festival at Huashi was hosted by the Queen Mother's Saturn Peach Palace, a Daoist Temple, founded in 1662. Though the temple was destroyed in the 1950s, the festival continues to be held annually in the nearby Ming City Wall Relics Park.
- Dongcheng District Hui Nationality Experimental Primary School at No. 235 Huashi Street, was founded in 1909 and originally based inside the Huashi Mosque. In 1941, renowned performers Ma Lianzhong and Hou Xirui raised funds to educate impoverished Hui Muslim children in the neighborhood and in 1943, moved the school to the larger confines of the Kitchen God Temple (Duzaojun Temple), which was once the largest temple in Beijing dedicated to the Daoist deity, the Kitchen God. The temple's two iron lions still guard the entrance to the school.

During the Republican era, the three top ranking students of each semester were exempt from paying tuition. Students were taught Arabic beginning in the third grade and classical Chinese in the fifth grade. Students also had two days per week of English instructions. A martial artist at the Fire God Temple taught physical education. The green and white school building with Islamic architectural elements was built in 1989 and expanded in 2001. The school remains a key point school in Dongcheng District and has pupils of Hui, Han, Manchu, Tibetan, Miao and other nationalities.

== Transportation ==
Huashi is accessible by subway and bus. Subway Lines 2, 5, and 7 run respectively along the neighborhood's northern, western and southern boundaries, and have stations at Chongwenmen (Lines 2 & 5), Ciqikou (Lines 5 & 7), and Guangqumennei (Line 7). Bus Route No. 12 plies a figure eight loop within the neighborhood. Bus Routes 8 and 525 also pass through Huashi. Bus Routes 25, 29, 39, 43, 44, 59, 674, 特2, 夜10, 夜19, 夜24, and 夜28 stop at Dongbianmen on the north edge of Huashi. Bus Routes 25, 39, 43, 623, 684, 685, 特7, 夜10, 夜24, and 夜28 stop at Huashi Intersection South, on the west edge of Huashi. In addition, Bus Routes 41, 60, 106, and 116 stop at Ciqi Intersection North, on the west edge of Huashi. Bus Routes 23, 57, 夜7, and 夜28 stop along Guangqumen Inner Street on the southern edge of Huashi.
