= Beijing Ming City Wall Ruins Park =

Archaeological park in China

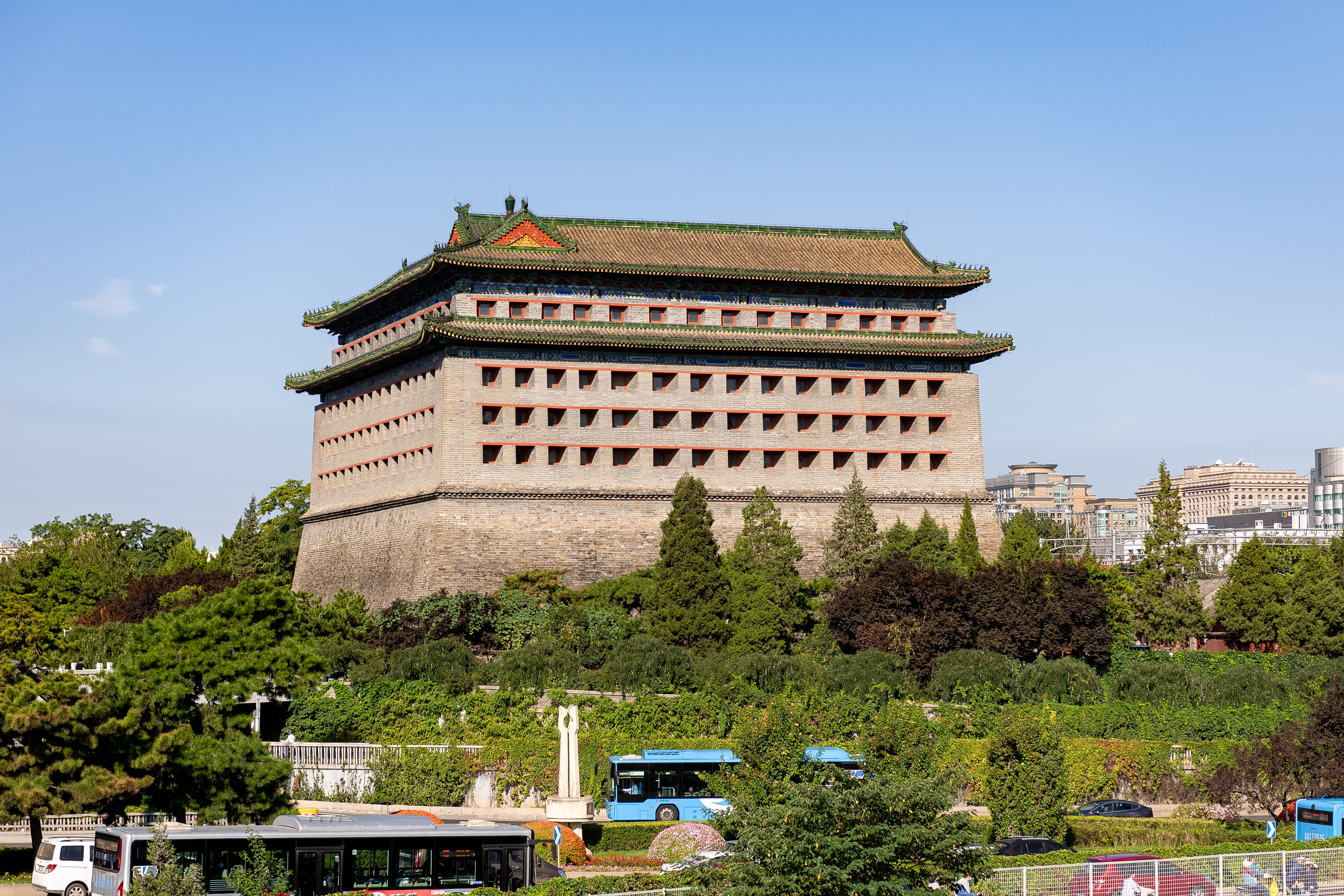
- The southeast corner tower of the Beijing Ming city wall in 2021

- Location within Beijing Location within China
- Location: Beijing, China
- Coordinates: 39.904059°N 116.435485°E

The Beijing Ming City Wall Ruins Park (traditional Chinese: 北京明城牆遺址公園; simplified Chinese: 北京明城墙遗址公园; pinyin: Běijīng Míng Chéngqiáng Yízhǐ Gōngyuán) is a park in Beijing with the longest and best preserved section of the city's Ming Dynasty city wall. The park is located 3 km (1.9 mi) from the city center and extends east from Chongwenmen to Dongbianmen and then north to near to Beijing Railway Station East Street. The park features a 1.5 km (0.93 mi) section of the Ming city wall and the Southeast Corner Tower, which are over 550 years old and surrounded by green park space to the south and east. The park covers an area of 15.5 ha (38 acres), including 3.3 ha (8.2 acres) of fortifications and 12.2 ha (30 acres) of green space. The corner tower and the ramparts atop the wall can be accessed for an admission fee.

== Location and access ==
Map of Beijing's Ming City walls. The Relics Park preserves the section of the wall between Chongwenmen and Dongbianmen.

The park is located at the southeast corner of Beijing's inner walled city, about 3 km (1.9 mi) southeast of Tiananmen Square in what is now Dongcheng District, just inside the Second Ring Road. Preserved in the park is a section of the Ming city wall and the Southeast Corner Tower, that once connected Chongwenmen and Dongbianmen, two city gates that have been replaced with roadway intersections. The longer southern city wall is attached to the Southeast Corner Tower itself while a shorter section of the eastern city wall is separated from the corner tower by a railway out of the Beijing railway station. Park space at the foot of the southern city wall extends along Chongwenmen East Avenue to the Second Ring Road. The Beijing Ancient Observatory, built atop another section of the eastern city wall at Jianguomen, is a short walk north of the corner tower. The Beijing railway station and its rail depots occupy the area immediately north of the park.

The corner tower's exhibits and ramparts are open from 8:00 am to 5:00 pm. Admission is Y10 for adults, half-price for students. Children below 1.2 m in height and senior citizens are admitted for free. The park space is not enclosed and is accessible to the public at all hours. The park is popular with tourists visiting the wall and residents from the surrounding neighborhood, who use the green space for recreation and dog walking. The park hosts the annual Huashi Saturn Peach Temple Festival.

The Ming City Wall Relics Park is accessible by Beijing Bus to "Dongbianmen" bus stop (Routes 25, 29, 39, 43, 44, 59, 434, 525, 610, 674 and 特2), "Chongwenmen East" bus stop (Routes 12, 25, 39, 43, 44, 525, 610) and "Jianguomen South" bus stop (Routes 25, 39, 43, 44, 52, 122, 434, 637, 638, 750 and 特2); and by Beijing Subway to Chongwenmen (Line 2) and Jianguomen station (Lines 1 and 2).

== History ==
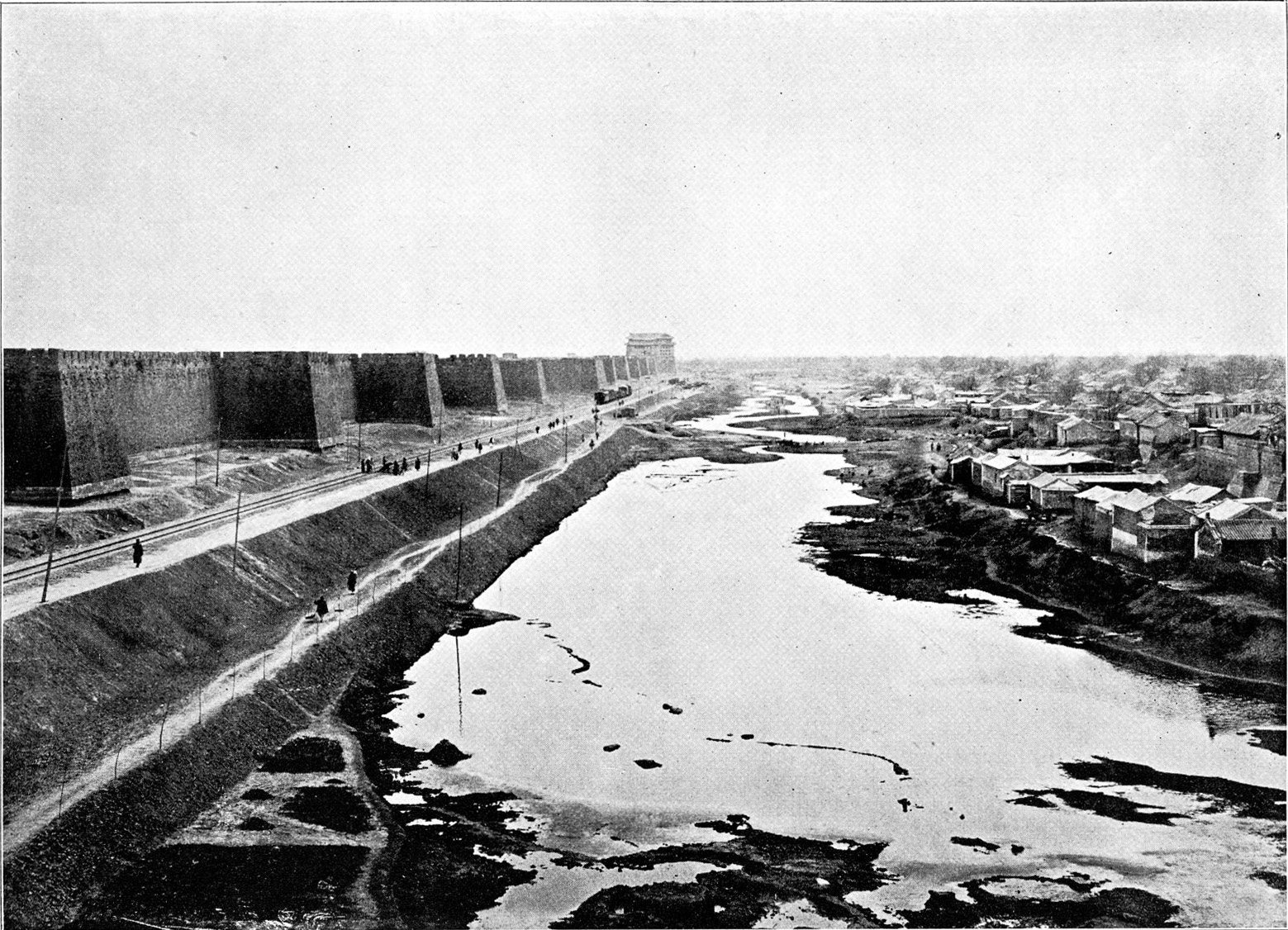
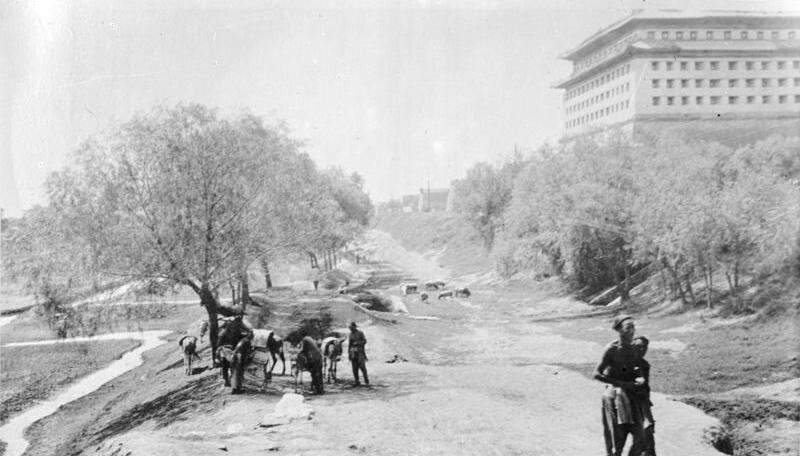
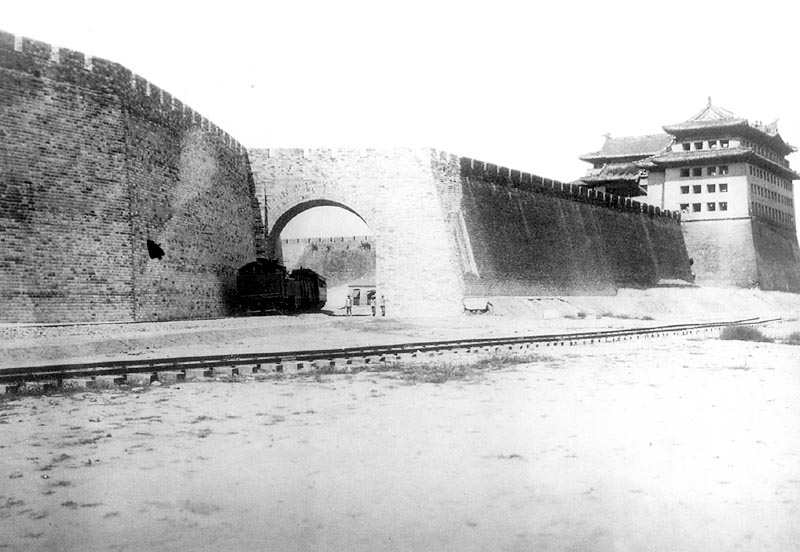
Left: The city wall from Chongwenmen to the Southeast Corner Tower in the early 1900s overlooking the moat and the Huashi neighborhood. The Corner Tower in 1900 (center) and in 1921 (right), after a gate was opened in the wall for railway tracks when the Beijing–Fengtian Railway was built over the moat outside the wall.

Beijing's inner city wall was built during the Ming Dynasty in 1419. The Ming city walls stood for nearly 550 years until the early 1960s when most of the gates and walls were torn down to build the Beijing Subway, which runs underneath where the walls stood. The subway's inner loop line turned into the Inner City at Chongwenmen to stop at the Beijing railway station, and did not need to run beneath a section of the wall at the southeast corner of the Inner City. Of the 40 km of the original wall, only this 1.5 km section was spared. Inside this section of the wall (north of the wall) are railway yards of Beijing Station. Outside the wall (south of the wall) stood residential homes and small businesses.

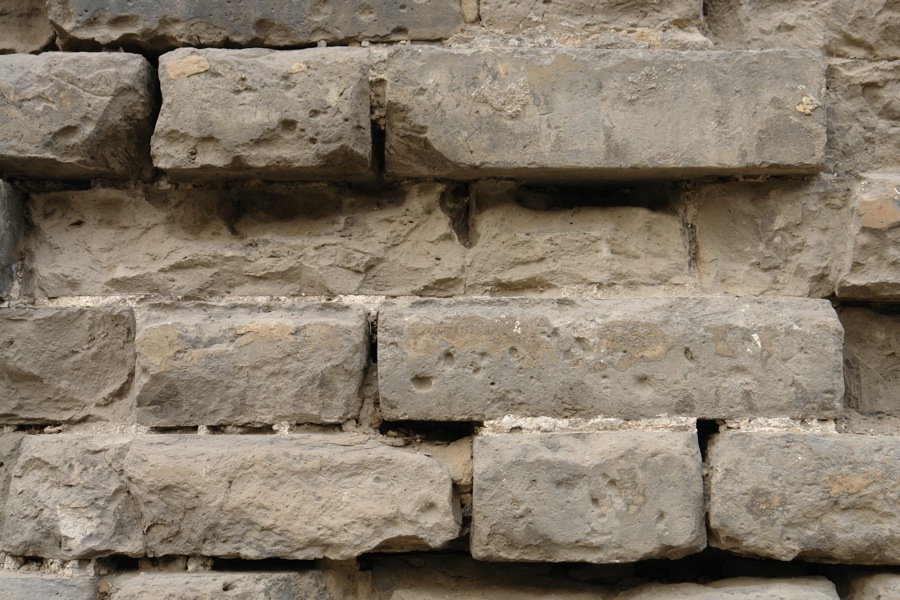
About one-fifth of the two million bricks used to restore the wall are from the Ming era.

In the late 1990s, the city government decided convert the remnants of the wall into a park and relocate the small businesses and homes between the foot of the southern city wall and Chongwenmen East Avenue. The relocated businesses and residents received compensation and tax exemptions. Construction began in November 2001. The homes, which lacked indoor heating, plumbing and running water, were razed but large trees that stood in the courtyards were preserved. To preserve the historical integrity of the fortifications, the authorities solicited donations of Ming era bricks from city residents to use in the restoration. About of one-fifth of 2,000,000 bricks used in the restoration are from the Ming-era. When the park was completed in September 2003, national leaders Jiang Zemin, Li Lanqing, Wan Li, Ding Guangen, and then municipal party secretary Jia Qinglin and mayor Liu Qi, visited the park.

== Relics Park ==
=== Southeast Corner Tower ===
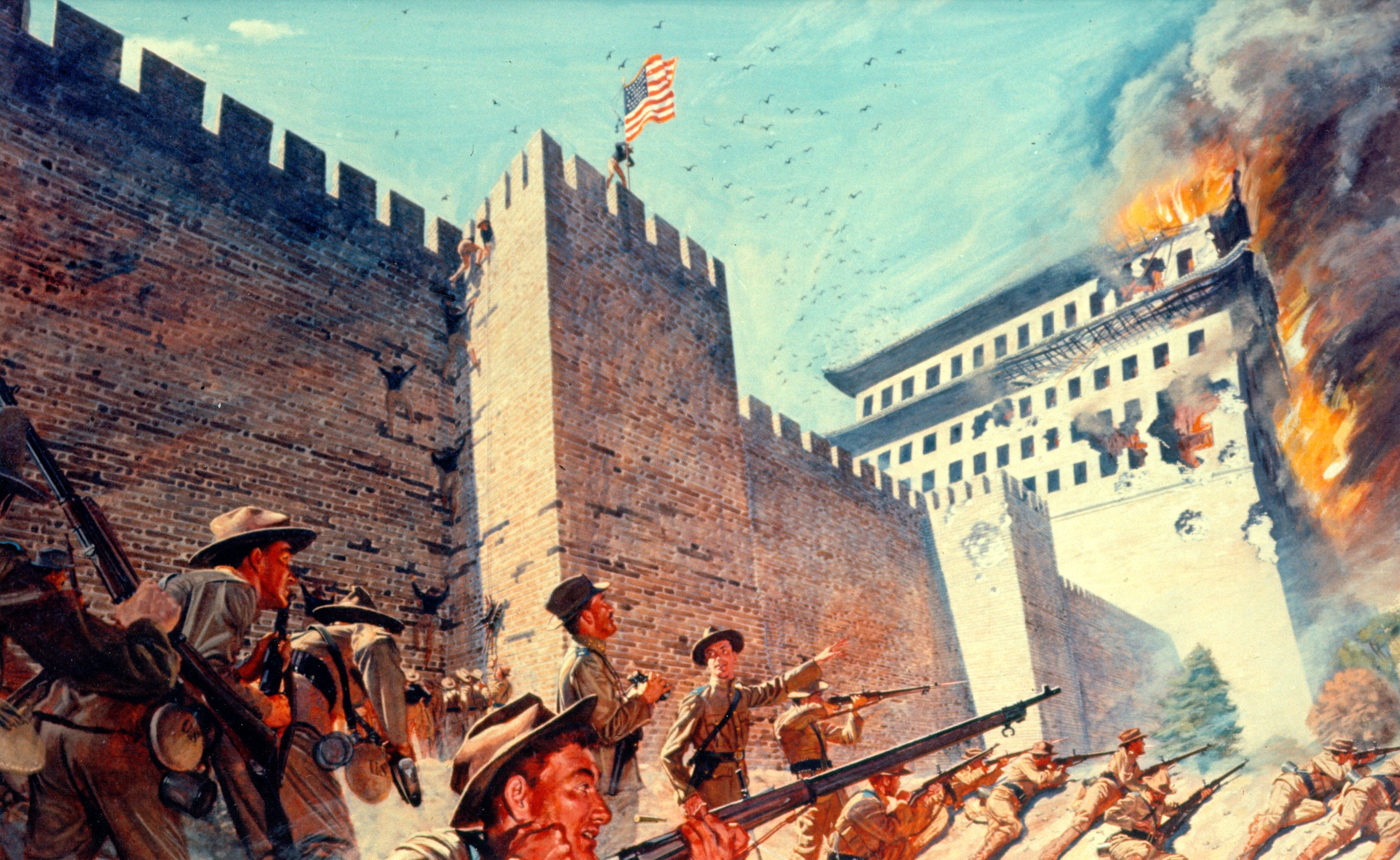
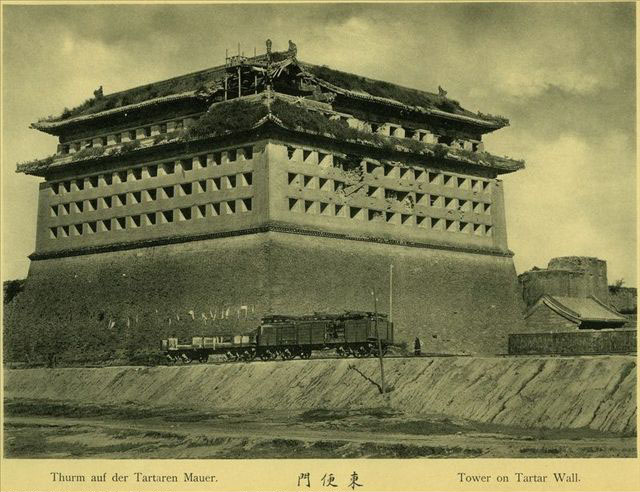
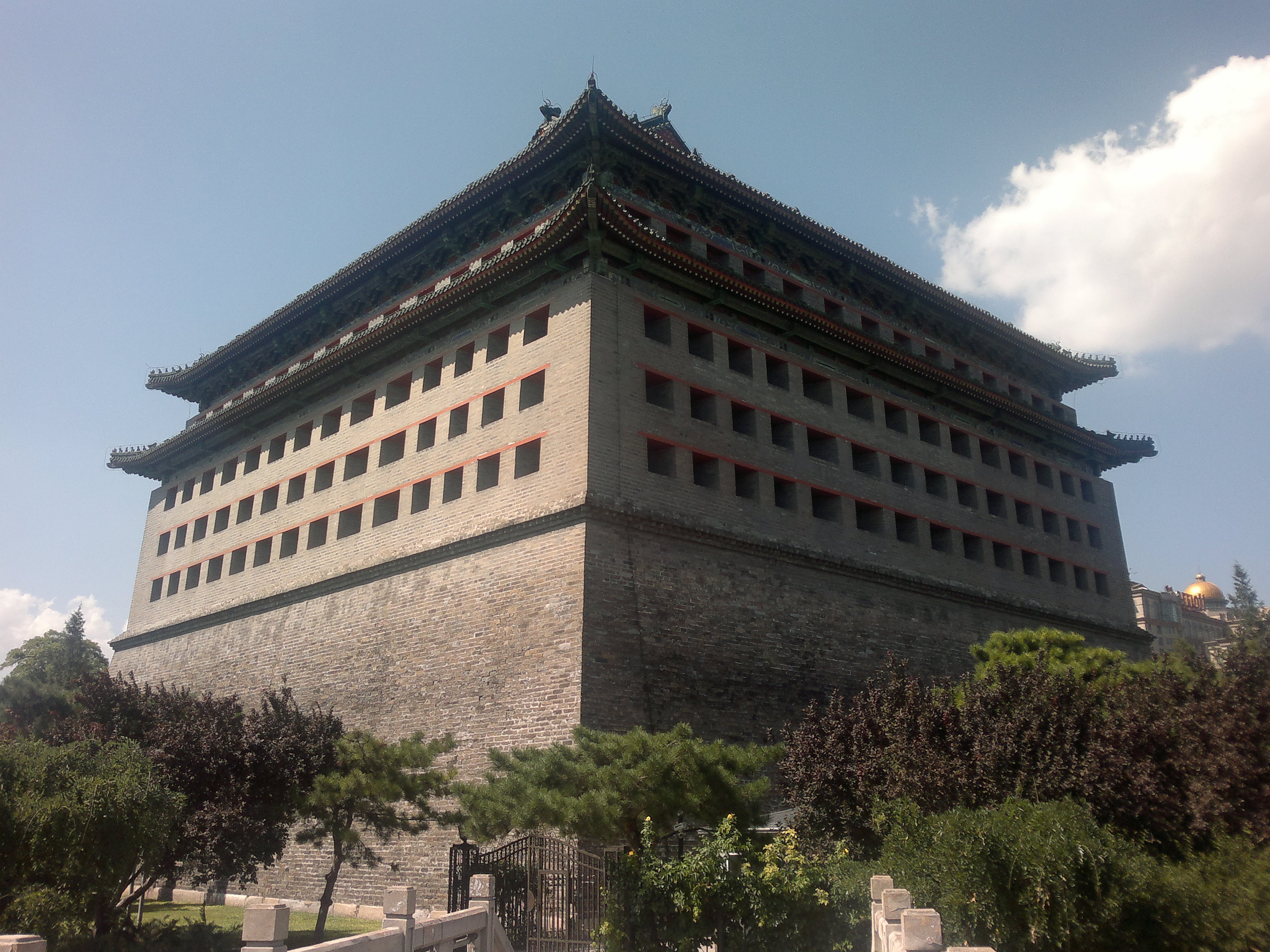
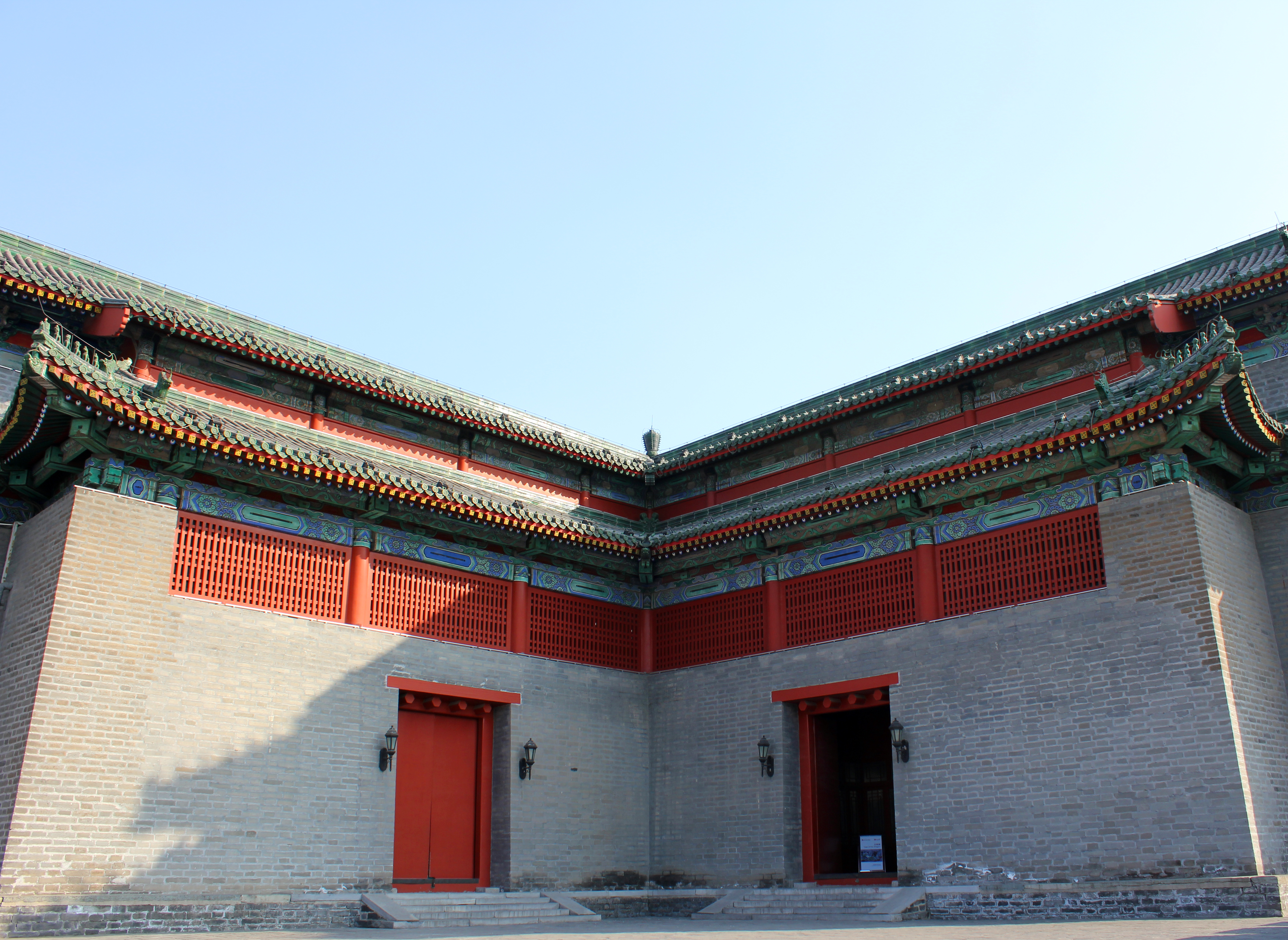
From left: (1) U.S. Army depiction of the assault on the Southeast Corner Tower on August 14, 1900; (2) Damage visible in German postcard circa. 1900–1903; (3) The tower in 2013; and (4) Atop the tower.

The Southeast Corner Tower was built from 1436 to 1439 and is a major state-protected historical site. The tower, which rises 29 m (95 ft) in height with 144 archery windows, is the largest corner tower still standing in China. The tower could house 200 soldiers and has ramps for soldiers and horses. During the Qing Dynasty, bannerman of the Plain Blue Banner were stationed at the corner tower. During the Boxer Rebellion of 1900, the tower was attacked and captured by the Eight-Nation Alliance. It was known by Westerners as the Fox Tower. Graffiti carved by the invaders are preserved inside the tower. The corner tower was restored in 1983 and became a tourist site. Inside the tower is an exhibit on the history of the city's Ming-era walls. The Red Gate Gallery, a privately managed, non-profit contemporary art gallery opened in 1991 inside the tower and operated for over two decades before moving to the 798 Art Zone. In 2003, the Southeast Corner Tower became part of the Ming City Wall Relics Park.

=== Wall and bastions ===
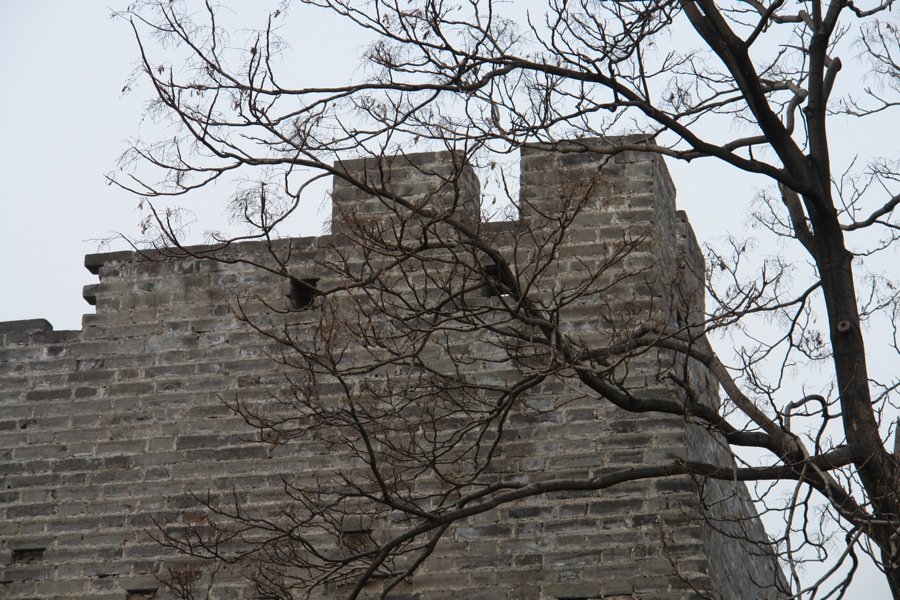
Battlements

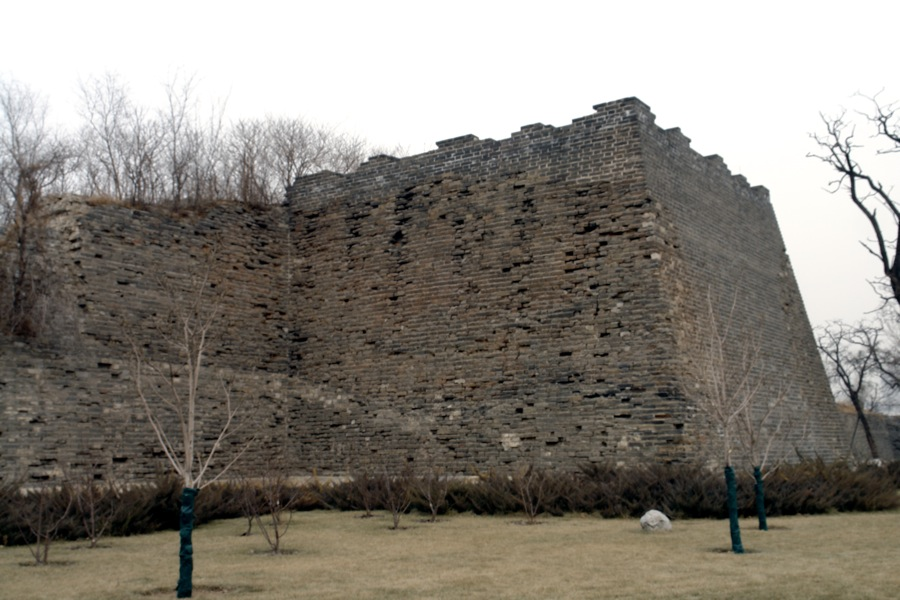
Bastion

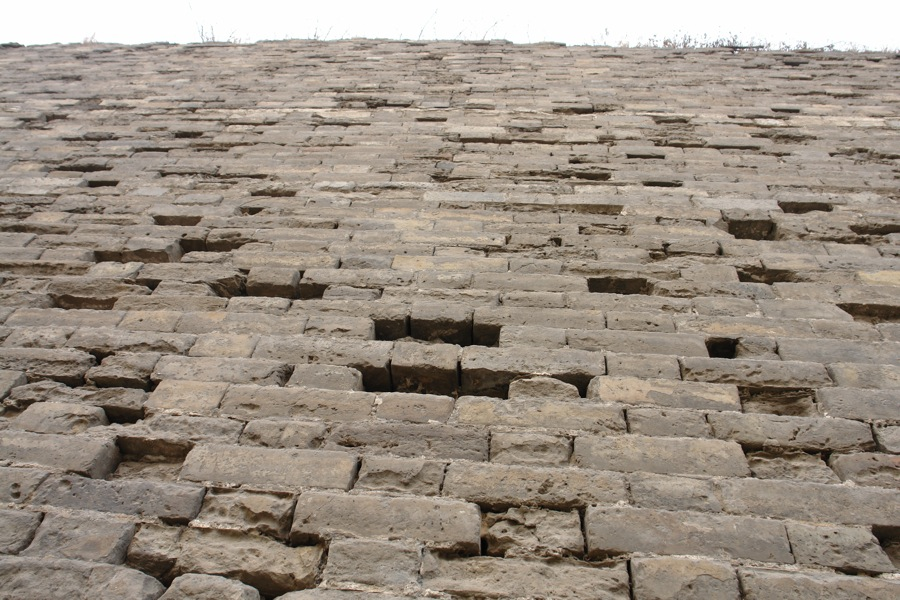
Wall

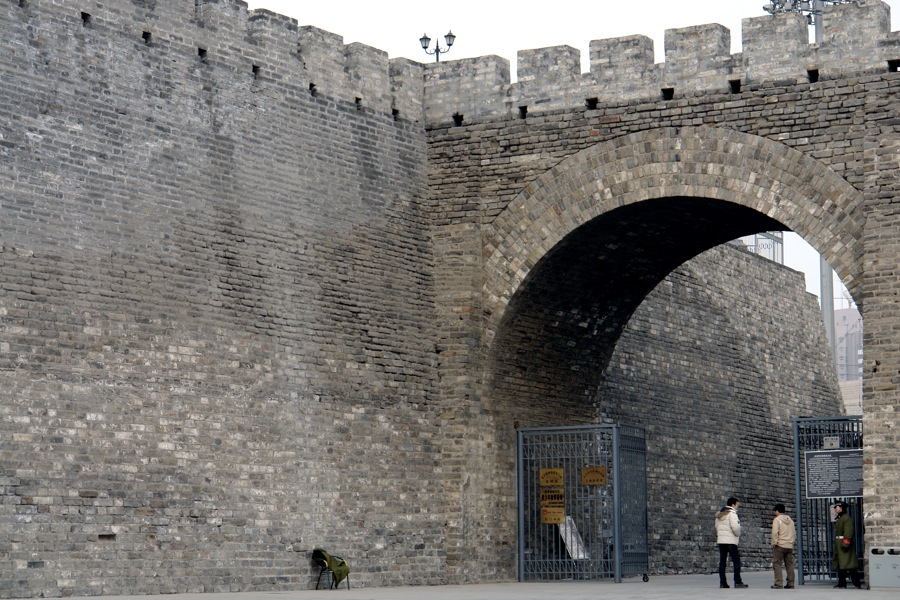
Archway

The inner city wall stood 11.4 m (37 ft) high and were topped with battlements that rose a further 1.9 m (6.2 ft). The wall, lined with brick and filled with rammed earth, was 19.8 m (65 ft) thick at the foundation and 16 m (52 ft) at the top. Bastions protruding on the outside face of the wall are locally known as mamian or "horse face". The bastions, spaced about 80 m (260 ft) apart, allowed archers to fire at attackers from three sides. The restored fortification has 11 bastions on the southern wall and two bastions on the shorter eastern wall. Only the battlements of the corner tower and one bastion has been fully restored.

=== Greenery ===
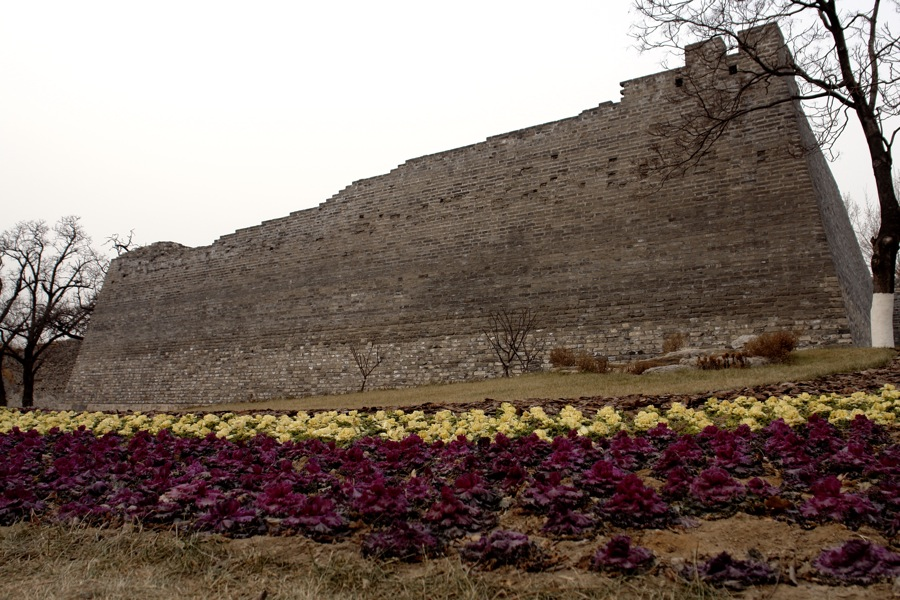
Flowers planted around the base of a partially restored bastion

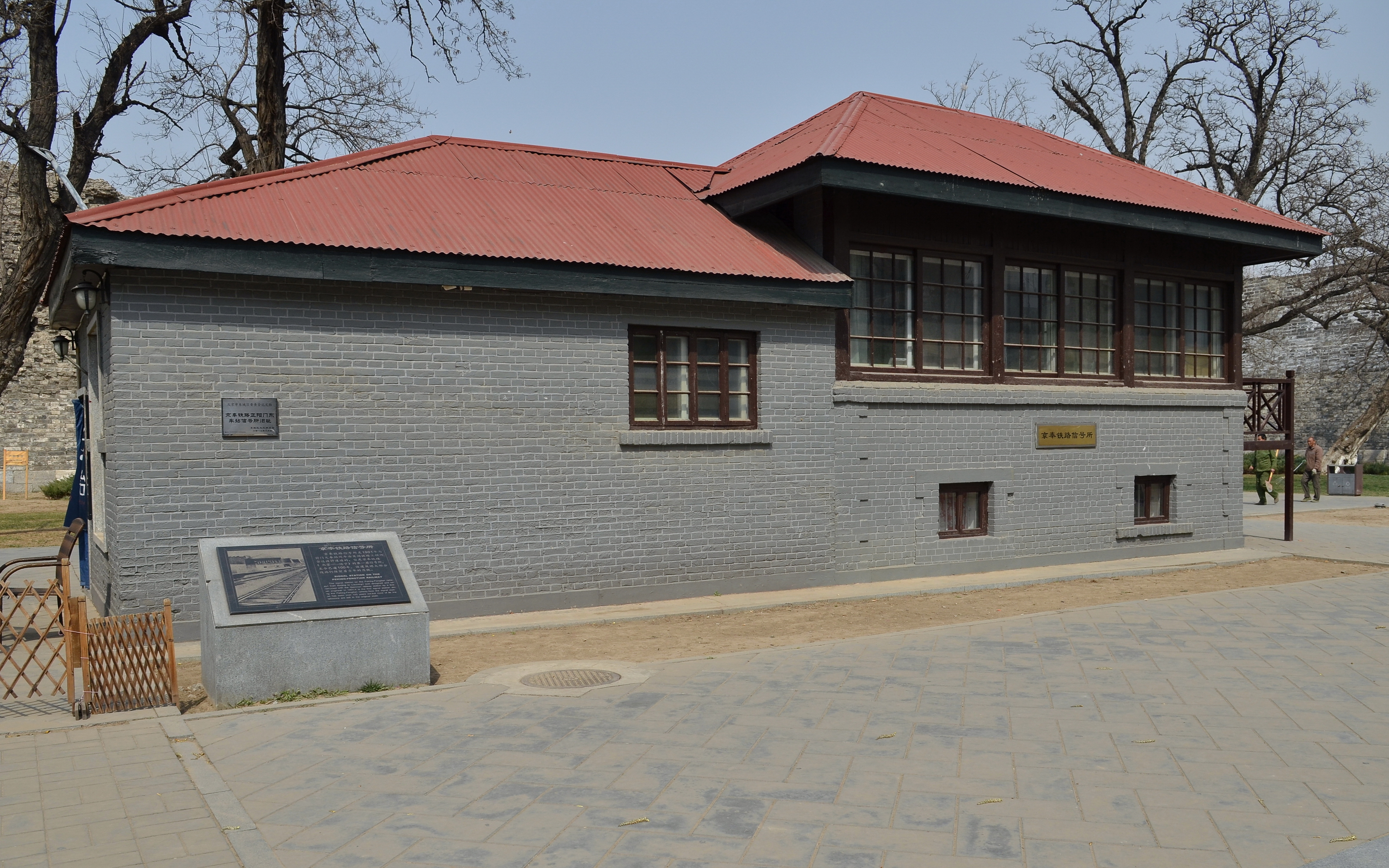
The restored signal house of the Beijing–Fengtian Railway.

During the restoration, some 400 trees, 6,000 bushes and 100,000 flowering plants were planted on the park grounds. In 2009, about 600 old trees on the park grounds were "adopted" by various social organizations that pledged to contribute to the cost of nourishing the trees, pruning, and insect-control.

=== Jingfeng Railway Signal House ===
Also on the park grounds is a restored signal house of the Beijing–Fengtian (Jingfeng) Railway built in 1901.

== See also ==
- Beijing city fortifications
- History of Beijing
- Beijing Liao and Jin City Wall Museum
