= Paraguayo =

Paraguayo may refer to

- a national of Paraguay
- Uncaria guianensis, cat's claw, a plant species in the genus Uncaria
- Flat peach, Prunus persica var. platycarpa, also known as donut peach and saturn peach
- Colloquial name for marihuana prensada
- Paraguayo Cubas (born 1962), Paraguayan politician
