= Qiaowan station =

Beijing Subway station

Qiaowan 桥湾
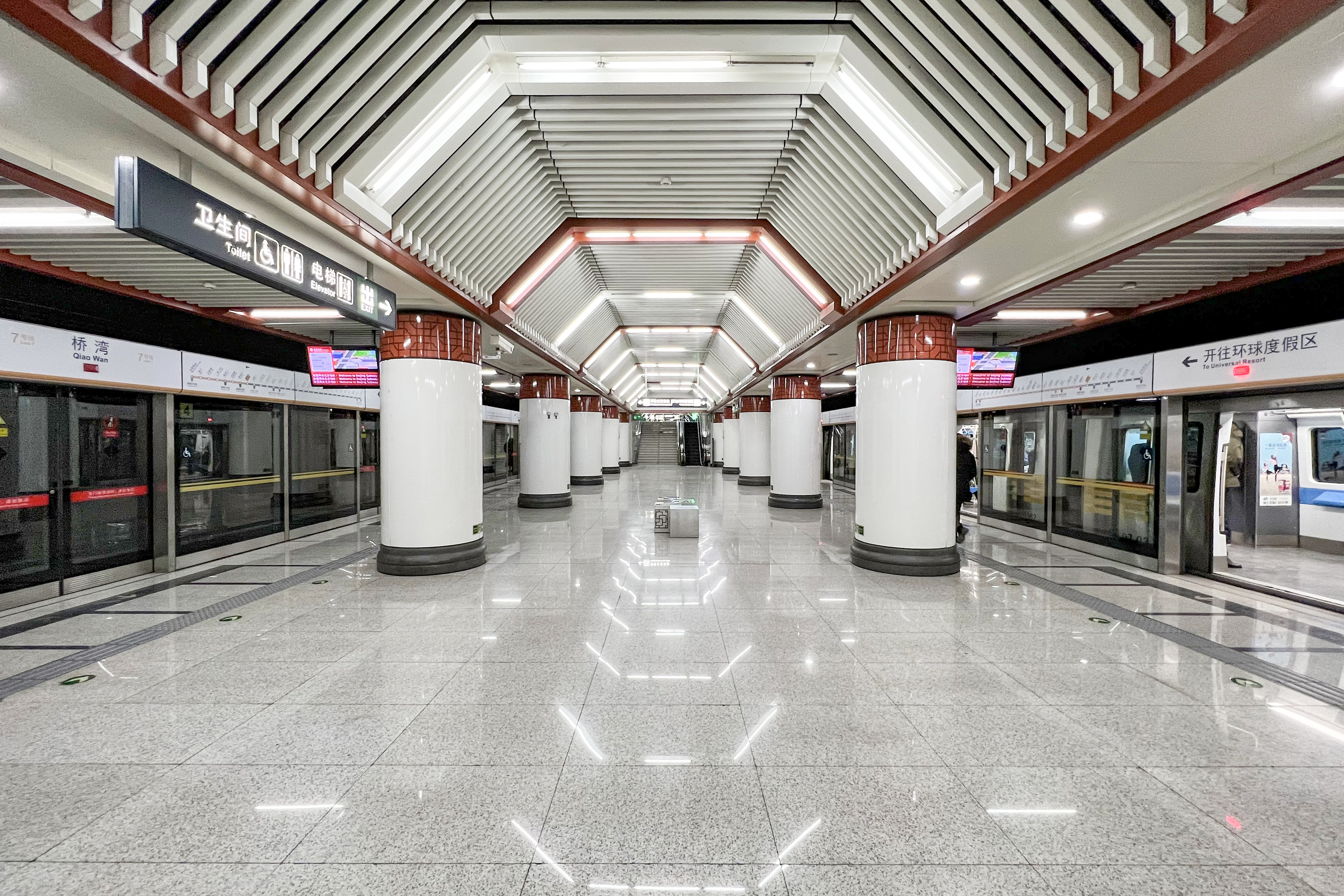
- Platform

General information
- Location: Zhushikou East Street (珠市口东大街); Dongcheng District, Beijing; China
- Coordinates: 39.892725°N 116.408464°E
- Operator: Beijing Mass Transit Railway Operation Corporation Limited
- Line: Line 7
- Platforms: 2 (1 island platform)
- Tracks: 2

Construction
- Structure type: Underground
- Accessible: Yes

History
- Opened: December 28, 2014; 11 years ago

Services
Preceding station	Beijing Subway	Following station
Zhushikou towards Beijing West railway station	Line 7	Ciqi Kou towards Universal Resort
Location
- Location within Beijing

Qiaowan Station (simplified Chinese: 桥湾站; traditional Chinese: 橋灣站; pinyin: Qiáowān Zhàn) is a station on Line 7 of the Beijing Subway. It was opened on December 28, 2014, as a part of the stretch between Beijing West railway station and Jiaohua Chang and is located between Zhushikou and Ciqi Kou.

== First and last time ==
- Beijing West Railway Station — Hua Zhuang
  - The first train 5:45
  - The last train 23:30
- Hua Zhuang — Beijing West Railway Station
  - The first train 5:37
  - The last train 22:52

== Station layout ==
The station has an underground island platform.

== Exits ==
There are 3 exits, lettered B, C, and D. Exit D is accessible.
