= Red Gate Gallery =

Beijing's first private contemporary art gallery

Red Gate Gallery, founded by Brian Wallace, is Beijing's first private contemporary art gallery. Located in the historic Southeast Corner Tower at Dongbianmen, one of the few Ming dynasty towers to survive the destruction of the city wall, the gallery presents articles of China's contemporary artistic expression in conjunction with the traditional. The gallery is open for business all days of the week and charges no admission fee.

== History ==
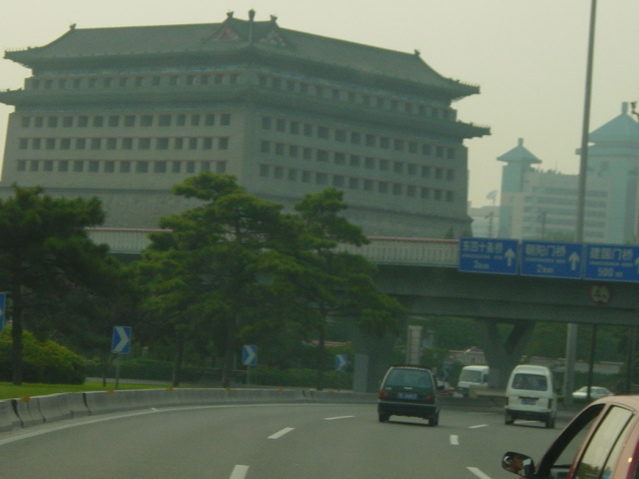
The Red Gate Gallery is housed inside the Southeast Corner Tower, a five-centuries-old relic of the Ming-era city wall at Dongbianmen.

Red Gate was founded in 1991 by Brian Wallace, an Australian who traveled to China in 1984 and returned in 1985 and 1986, remaining to study and to work at the Foreign Languages Press from 1989 to 1990 before entering the Central Academy of Fine Arts in Beijing to study Chinese Art History. During this period he began to consider founding a Contemporary Chinese Art gallery. Through 1988 and 1989 he organized exhibitions with friends at the Beijing Ancient Observatory at Jianguomen. The contemporary art scene of the time consisted of grassroots efforts combined with the initiative of foreigners. Shunned by exclusive traditional art establishments, young artists circled through Beijing with slides of their work, searching for interested viewers. They would exhibit in the hotel rooms of foreigners or guide the curious to their tiny homes, where their work took up all the available space. After completing his studies, Wallace founded Red Gate Gallery in the five-centuries-old Ming-era Southeast Corner Tower at Dongbianmen in what is now the Ming City Wall Relics Park of Dongcheng District. The inaugural exhibition of July 1991 showcased the works of Zhang Yajie, Dagong, Wang Lifeng and Wang Luyan.

Red Gate Gallery's collaboration with Tibetan artists produced the "Return to Lhasa" show in 2008, featuring artists such as Gonkar Gyatso. Also in 2008, Red Gate held a December art exhibit as a fundraiser for Shepherds Field Village children's orphanage. In 2011, Red Gate celebrated its 20th anniversary.

== Artists represented ==
Liu Dao, Chen Qingqing, Chen Yufei, Han Qing, Jiang Weitao, Li Gang. Liu Qinghe, Lu Peng, Shi Zhongying, Su Xinping, Tan Ping, Wang Lifeng, Wang Yuping, Xie Guoping, Zheng Xuewu, Zhou Jirong, Zhou Jun.

== Red Gate residency ==
Gallery founder Brian Wallace's insider perspective on contemporary Chinese art gradually led him to become an unofficial contact person for international artists seeking an introduction to the Beijing art scene. In 2001, Brian began renting a studio facility for hosting visiting artists. The program expanded to keep pace with demand. Today, the gallery manages ten fully equipped facilities—four apartments in the downtown Tuanjiehu neighborhood and six studio/lofts northeast of the city in Feijiacun village. They currently host over 70 residents a year.

The program operates on a not-for-profit basis under the aegis of Red Gate Gallery. Participants are expected to cover their own transportation, supply, and accommodation expenses. Many receive financial assistance from their native countries. Red Gate cultivates relationships with countries and organizations that provide sponsorship. The Austrian Embassy currently collaborates with the residency program to send competitively selected artists year-round.

Red Gate Residency is a member of ResArtis and the Alliance of Artists Communities, international networks of artist residency programs. Their focus is on forming a multicultural arts dialogue within an immersion setting. Red Gate provides an entry point into the Chinese Contemporary Art scene in Beijing and hosts events for residents. Informal Open Studio exhibitions are arranged every other month to showcase the projects resident artists have completed during their stay.

== See also ==
- Ming City Wall Relics Park
