= Ciqi Kou station =

Beijing Subway interchange station

Ciqi Kou 磁器口
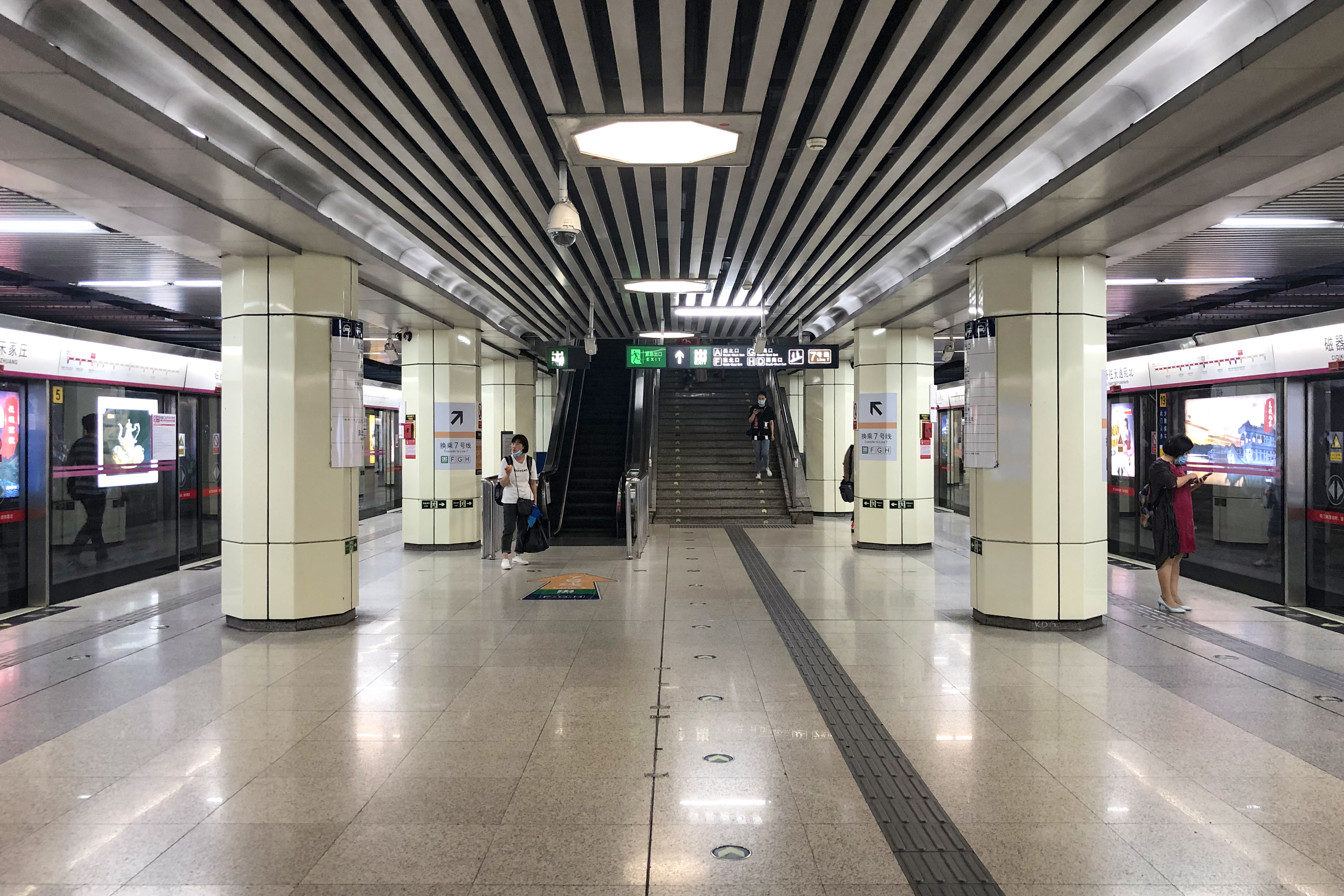
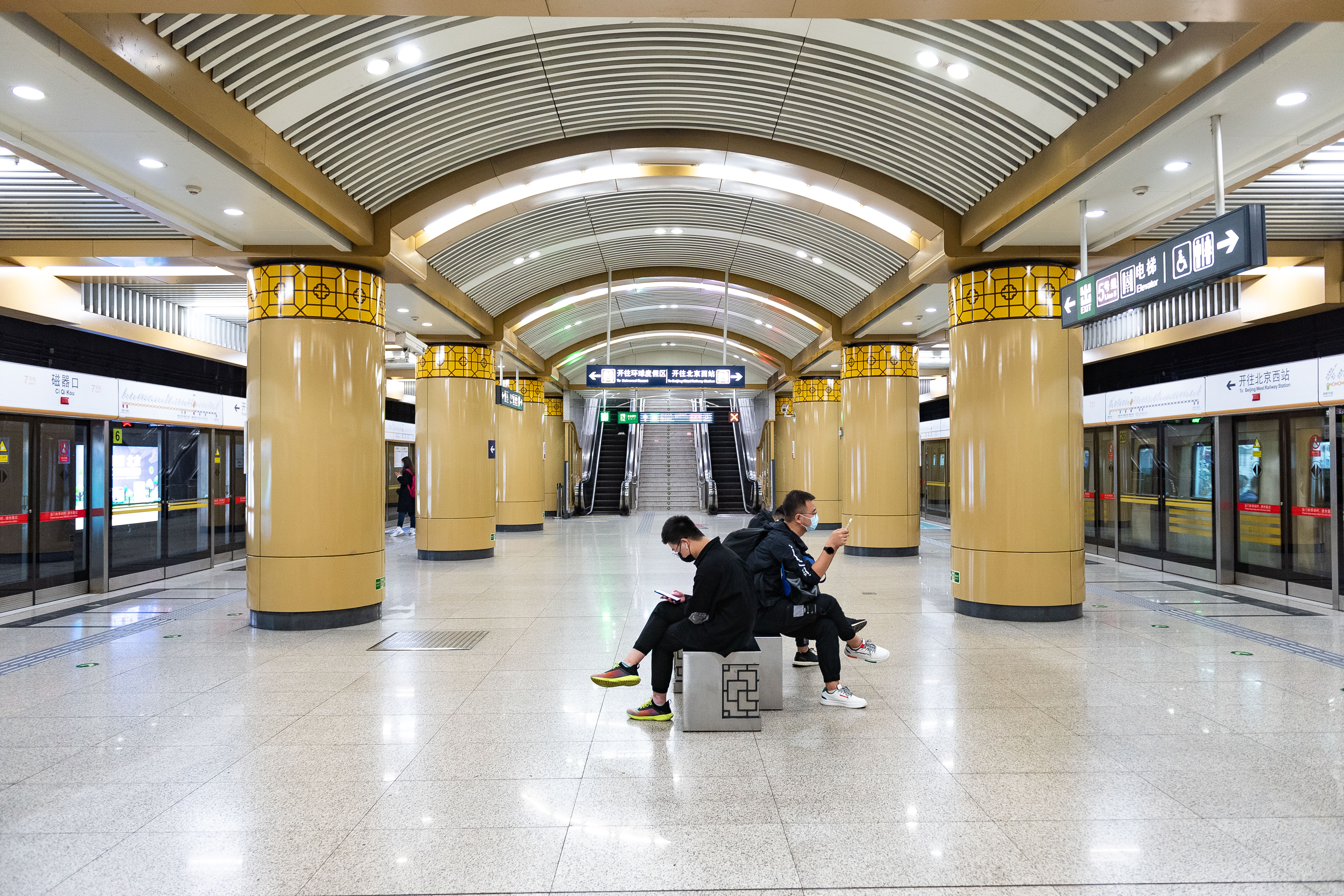
- Line 5 platform Line 7 platform

General information
- Location: Chongwenmen Outer Street and Zhushikou East Street (珠市口东大街) / Guangqumen Inner Street; Dongcheng District, Beijing; China
- Coordinates: 39.893172°N 116.41994°E
- Operator: Beijing Mass Transit Railway Operation Corporation Limited
- Lines: Line 5; Line 7
- Platforms: 4 (2 island platforms)
- Tracks: 4

Construction
- Structure type: Underground
- Accessible: Yes

History
- Opened: October 7, 2007; 18 years ago (Line 5); December 28, 2014; 11 years ago (Line 7)

Services
Preceding station	Beijing Subway	Following station
Chongwen Men towards Tiantongyuanbei	Line 5	Temple of Heaven East Gate towards Songjiazhuang
Qiaowan towards Beijing West railway station	Line 7	Guangqumennei towards Universal Resort
Location
- Location within Beijing

Ciqi Kou Station (Chinese: 磁器口站; pinyin: Cíqì Kǒu Zhàn) is an interchange station between Line 5 and Line 7 of the Beijing Subway.

== Station layout ==
Both the line 5 and 7 stations have underground island platforms.

There are 5 exits, lettered A, D, F1, G, and H. Exits A and F1 are accessible.

== Gallery ==
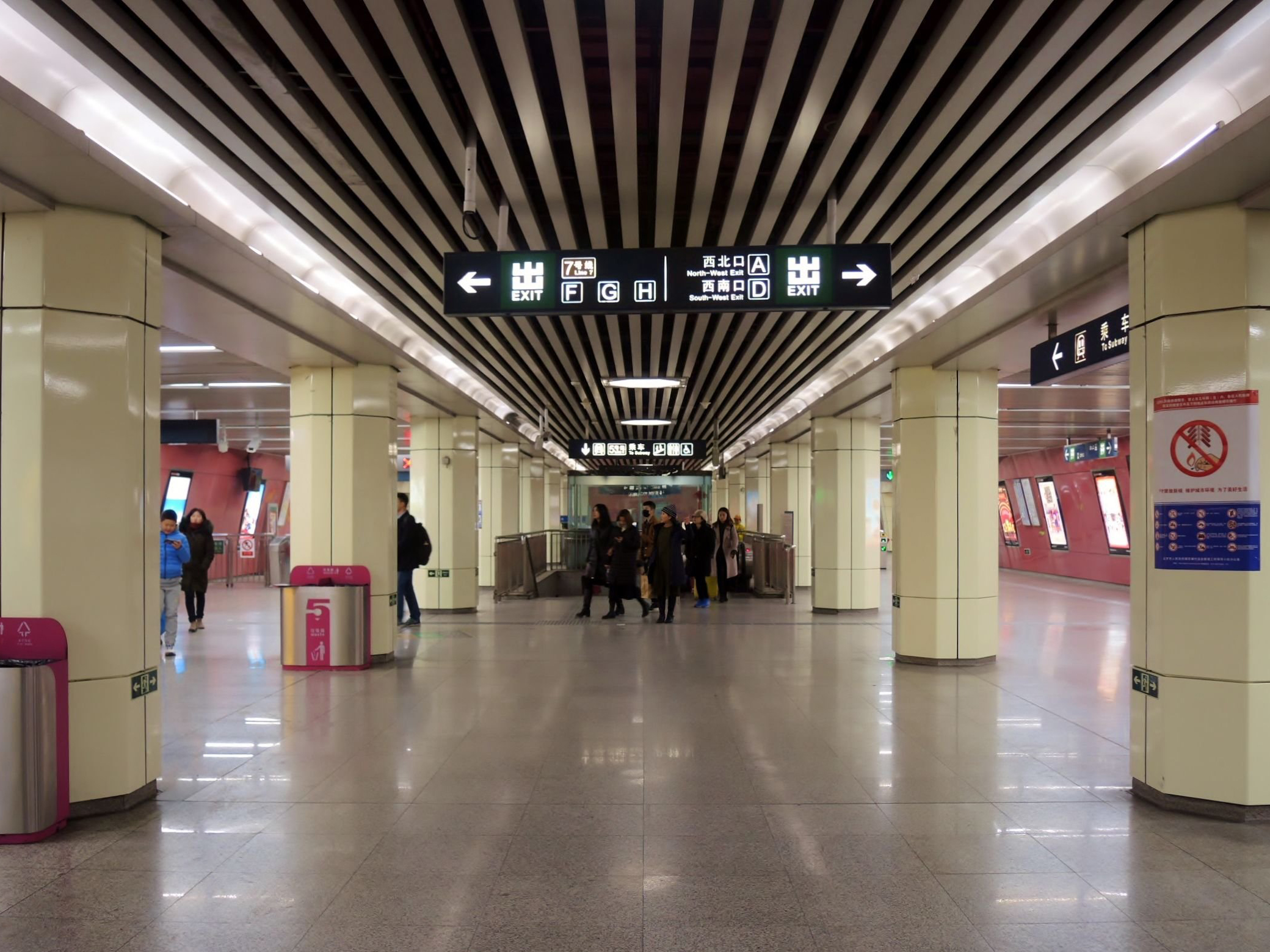
Line 5 concourse

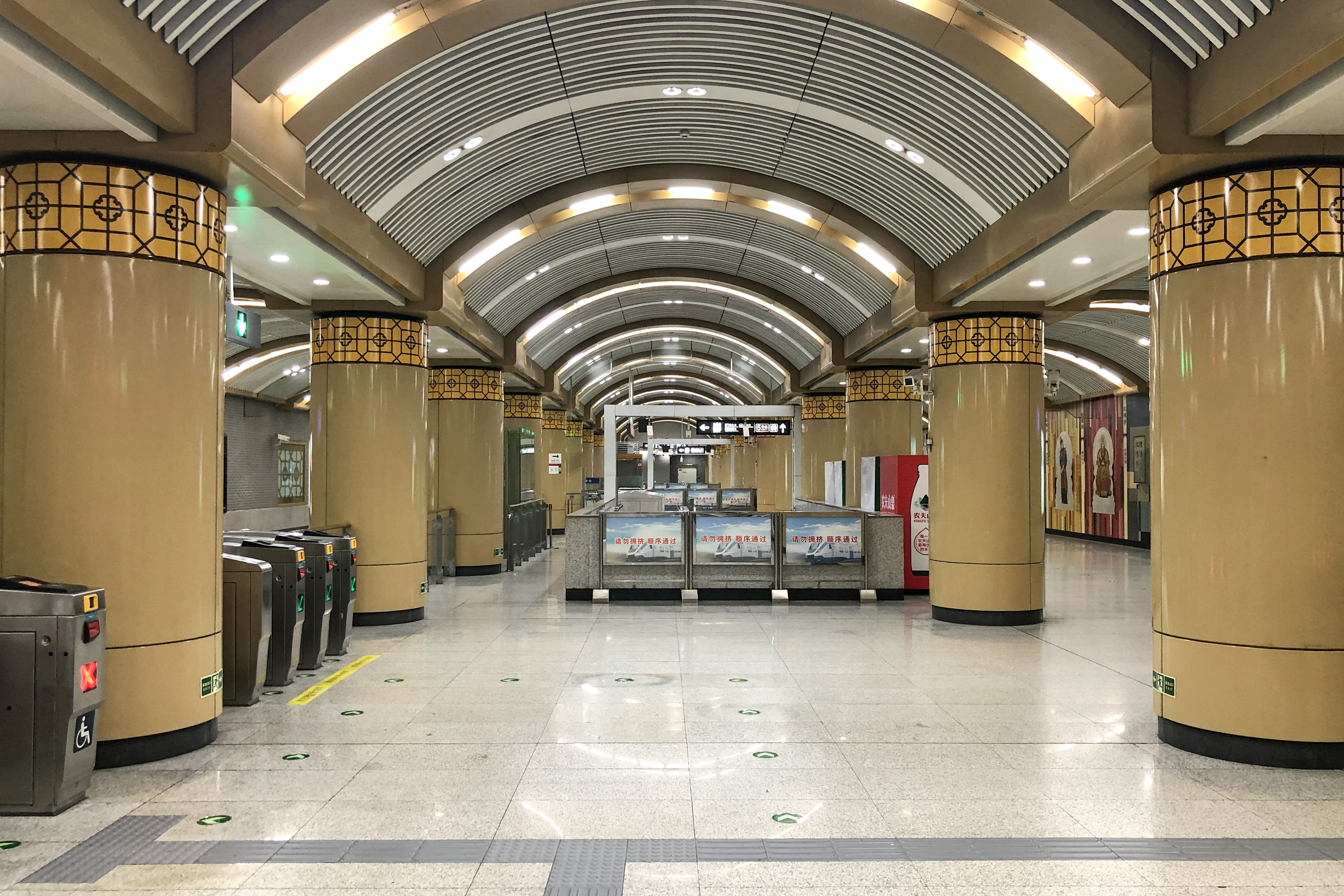
Line 7 concourse
