= Chongwenmen =

Former city gate in Beijing

Coordinates: 39.8982°N 116.4176°E

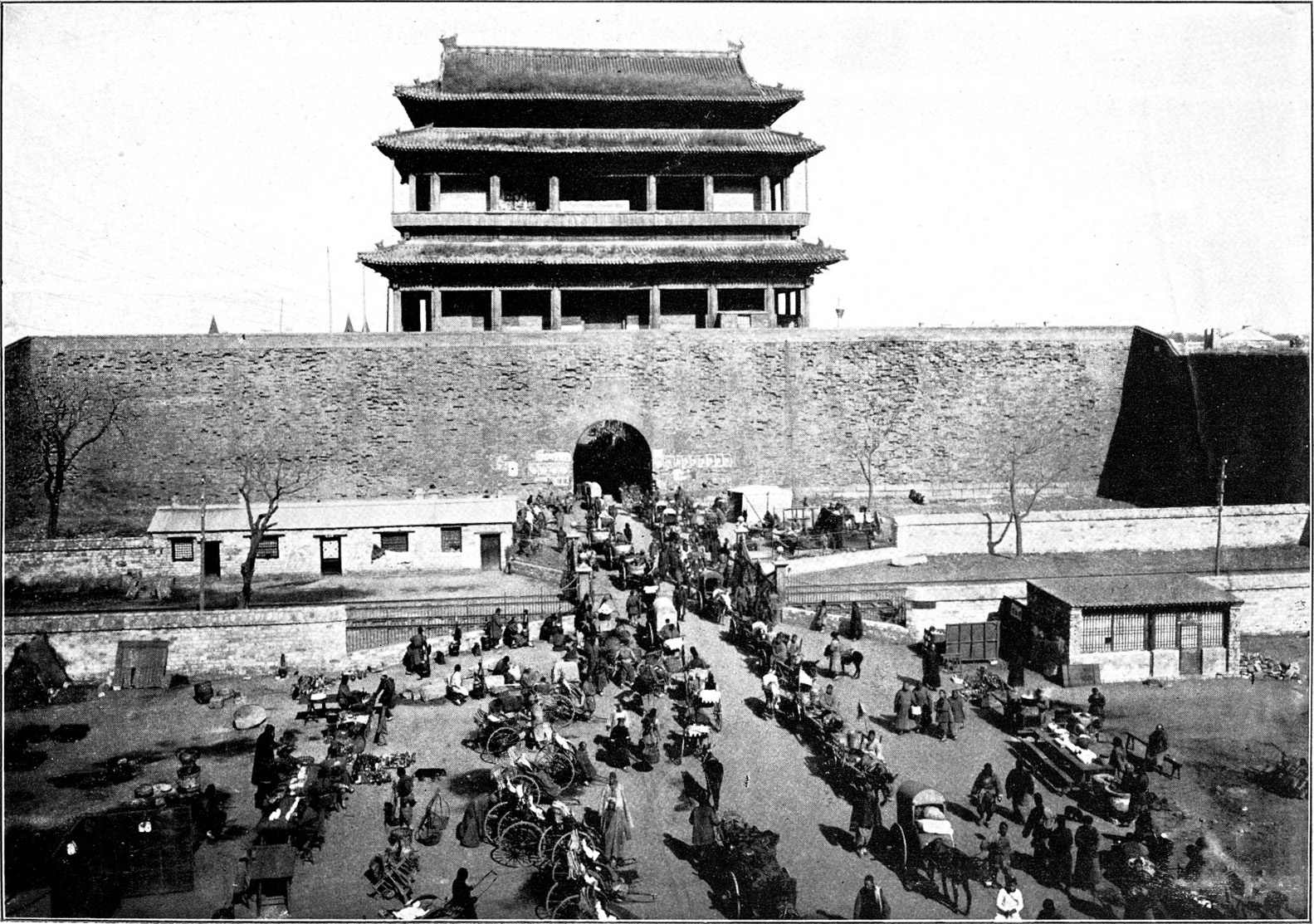
Chongwenmen Gate circa 1906

Chongwenmen (Chinese: 崇文門; pinyin: Chóngwénmén; Manchu: ᡧᡠ
ᠪᡝ
ᠸᡝᠰᡳᡥᡠᠯᡝᡵᡝ
ᡩᡠᡴᠠ; Möllendorff: šu be wesihulere duka) was a gate that was part of Beijing's city wall in what is now Dongcheng District. The gate stood in the southeastern part of Beijing's inner city, immediately south of the old Beijing Legation Quarter. In the 1960s, the gate and much of the wall was torn down to make room for Beijing's second ring road. Today, Chongwenmen is marked by the intersection of Chongwenmen Nei (Inner) and Chongwenmen Wai (Outer) Street, which run north–south through the former gate, Chongwenmen East and Chongwenmen West Street, which run east–west where the wall stood, and Beijing Station West Street, a diagonal street, going northwest to the Beijing railway station. Chongwenmen is a transport node in Beijing. Chongwenmen Station is an interchange station on Lines 2 and 5 of the Beijing Subway. Chongwen District, an administrative division of the city from 1952 to 2010 and now folded into Dongcheng District, was named after Chongwenmen.

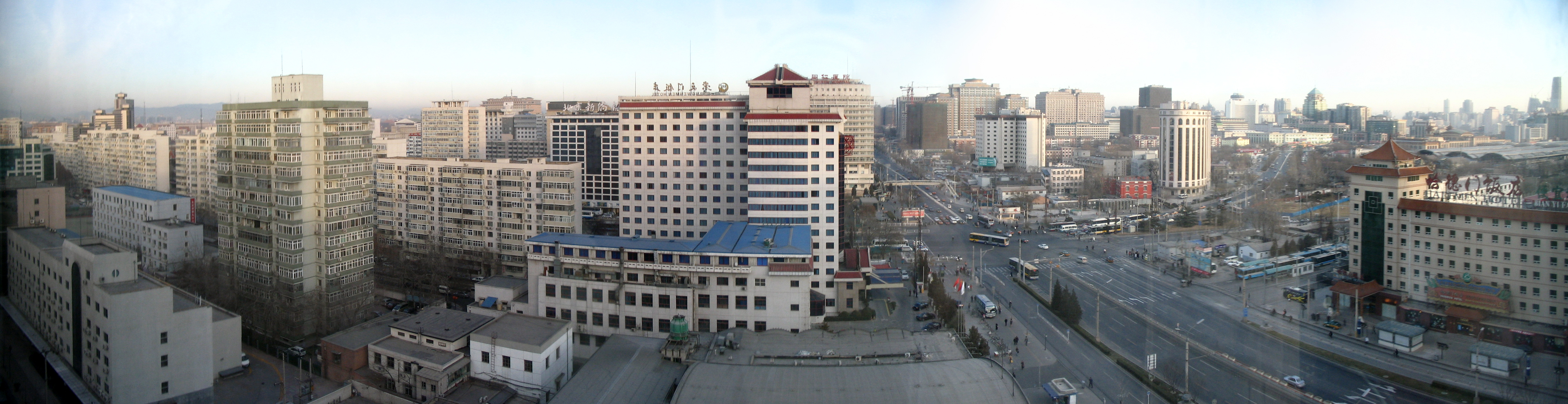
Chongwenmen intersection in 2007, with the Hademen Hotel, named after Chongwenmen's colloquial name visible at right

== History ==
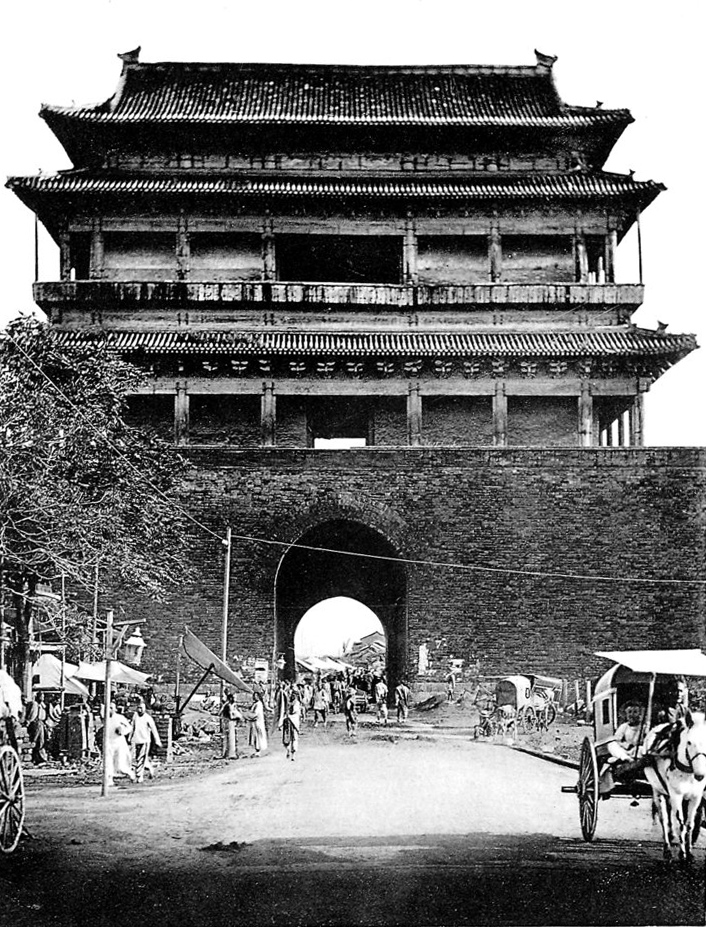
Chongwenmen Gate at the outset of the 20th Century

During the Yuan dynasty, the gate was called Wenmingmen (文明門). Because the residence of the Mongol prince Hada was located close by, the gate was also popularly known as Hadamen (traditional 哈達門, simplified 哈大門) or Hademen (traditional 哈德門, simplified 哈德门). The name Hademen survived well into the twentieth century, and was even the name of a popular cigarette brand. The Hademen Hotel now overlooks where the gate once stood. To the east of Chongwenmen, the Ming City Wall Relics Park has the best preserved remaining section of Beijing's Ming city wall.

== Transport ==
Chongwenmen is served by Chongwenmen Station on Line 2 and Line 5 of the Beijing Subway. It is also served by numerous Beijing Bus routes.
