= Chongwen Men station =

Beijing Subway interchange station

Chongwen Men 崇文门
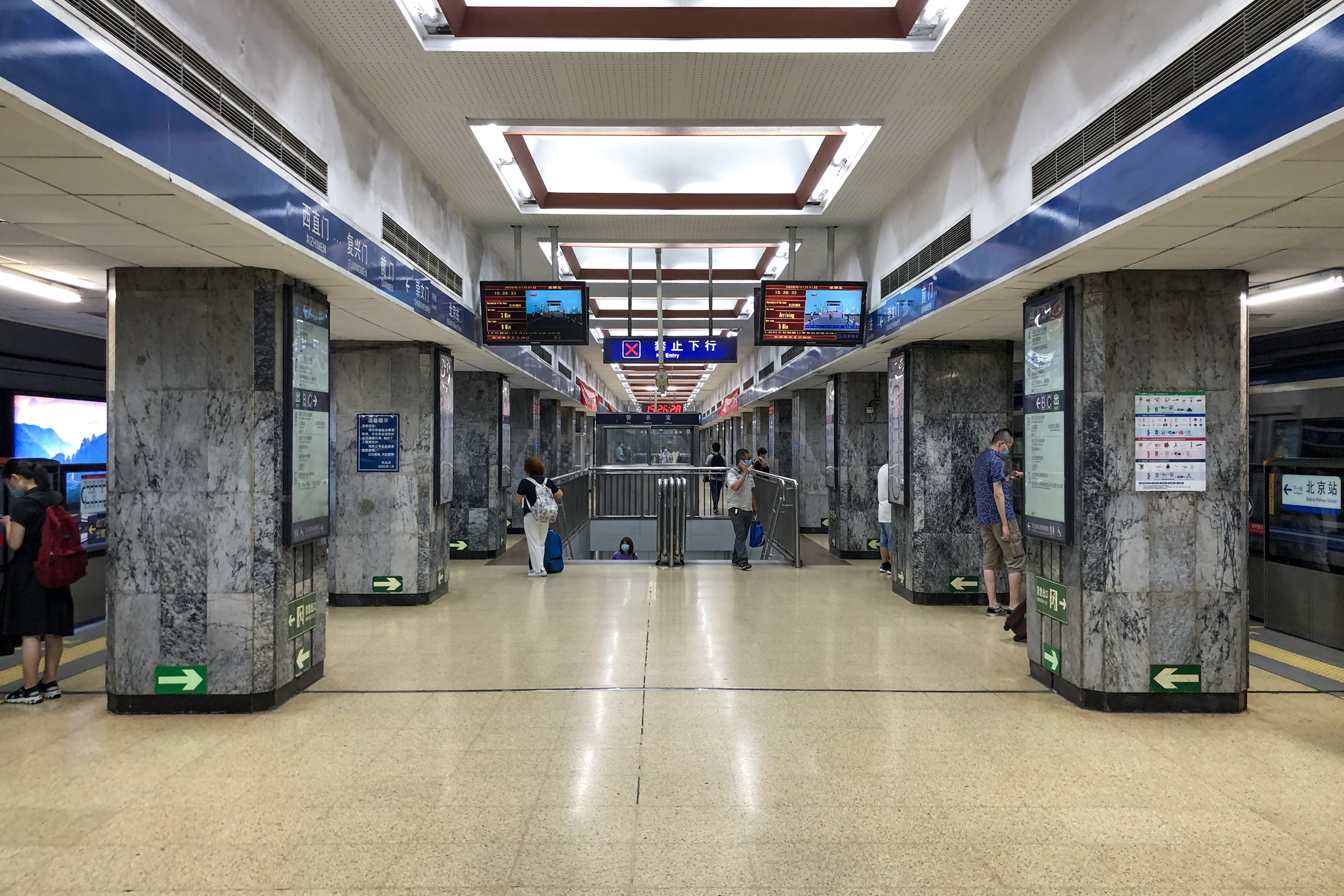
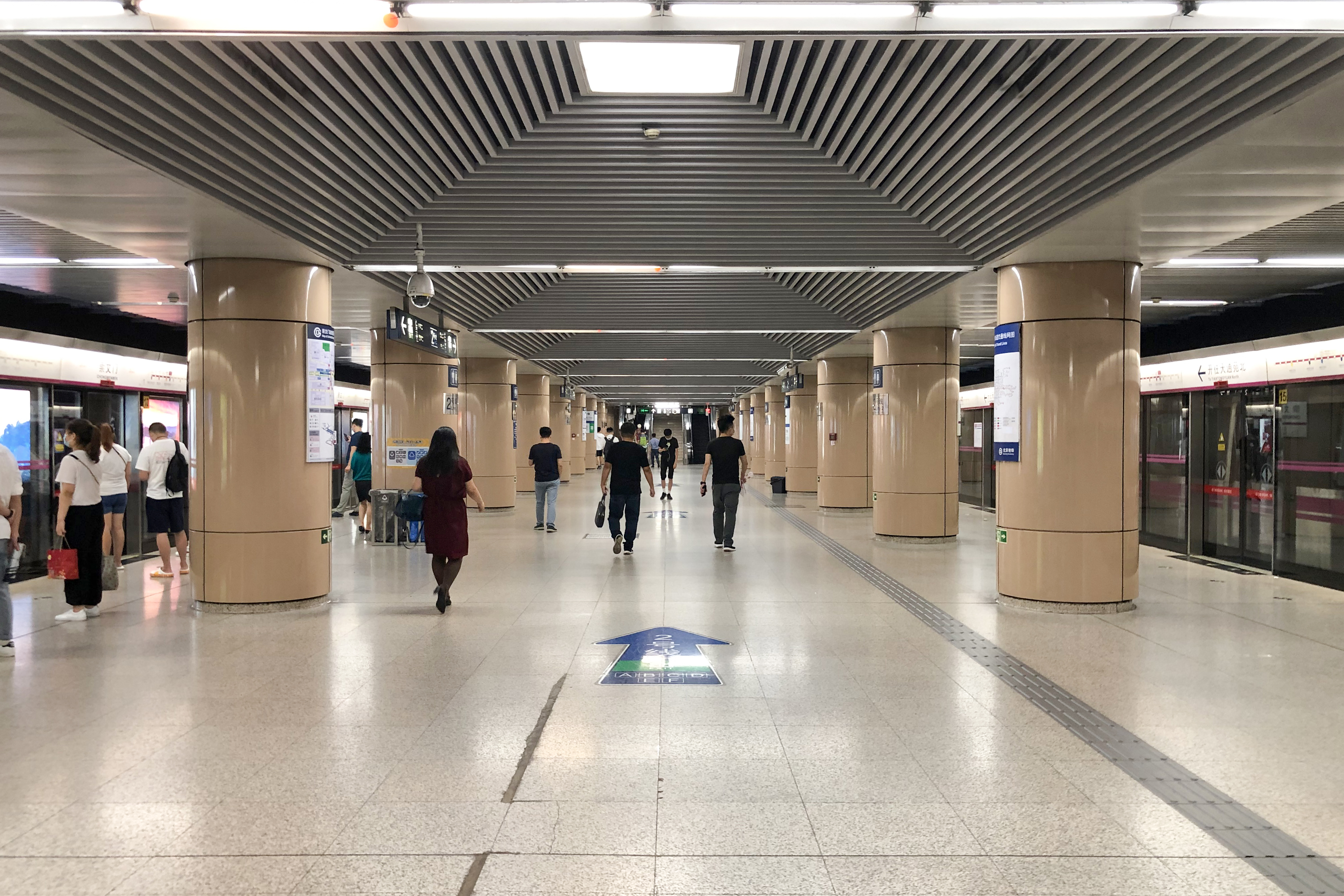
- Line 2 platform Line 5 platform

General information
- Location: Chongwenmen; Dongcheng District, Beijing; China
- Coordinates: 39.9011°N 116.4170°E
- Operator: Beijing Mass Transit Railway Operation Corporation Limited
- Lines: Line 2; Line 5
- Platforms: 4 (2 island platforms)
- Tracks: 4

Construction
- Structure type: Underground
- Accessible: Yes

Other information
- Station code: 209 (Line 2)

History
- Opened: January 15, 1971; 55 years ago (Line 2); October 7, 2007; 18 years ago (Line 5)

Services
Preceding station	Beijing Subway	Following station
Beijing railway station outer loop / anticlockwise	Line 2	Qianmen inner loop / clockwise
Dongdan towards Tiantongyuanbei	Line 5	Ciqi Kou towards Songjiazhuang
Location
- Location within Beijing

Chongwen Men Station (simplified Chinese: 崇文门站; traditional Chinese: 崇文門站; pinyin: Chóngwén Mén Zhàn) is an interchange station on Line 2 and Line 5 of the Beijing Subway at Chongwenmen in Dongcheng District.

== Bus stops ==
- Chongwenmen West: 8, 9, 20, 41, 44, 59, 60 103, 104, 110, 203, 209, 211, 673, 723, 729.
- Chongwenmennei: 25, 39, 41, 106, 108, 110, 111, 116, 684, 685
- Chongwenmenwai: 108, 111
- Chongwenmen East: 12, 25, 39, 43, 44, 525, 610

== Station layout ==
Both the line 2 and 5 stations have underground island platforms.

== Exits ==
There are ten exits, lettered A1, A2, B1, B2, C, D, E, F, G, and H. Exits B1, E, and F are accessible.

== Gallery ==
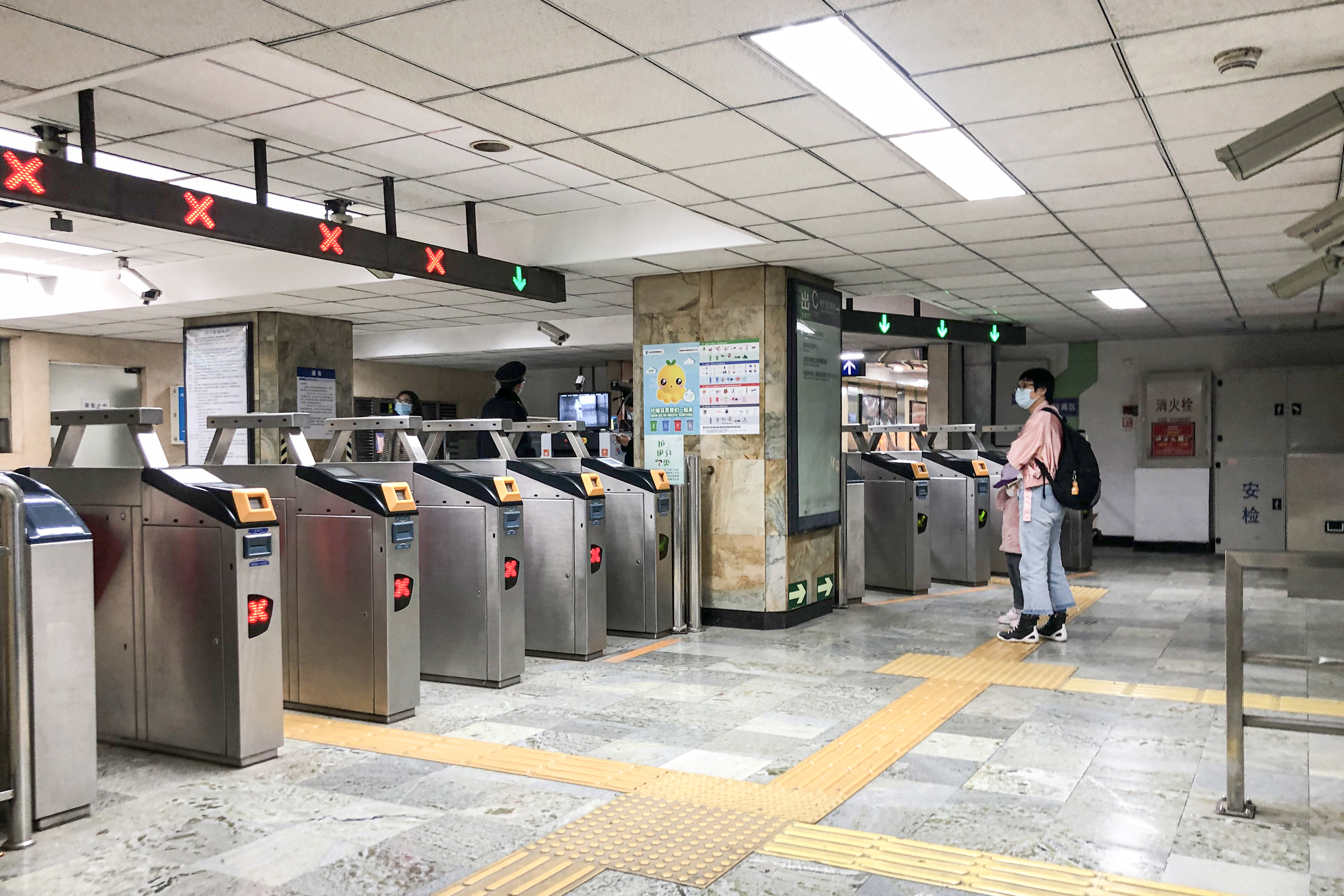
Line 2 east concourse

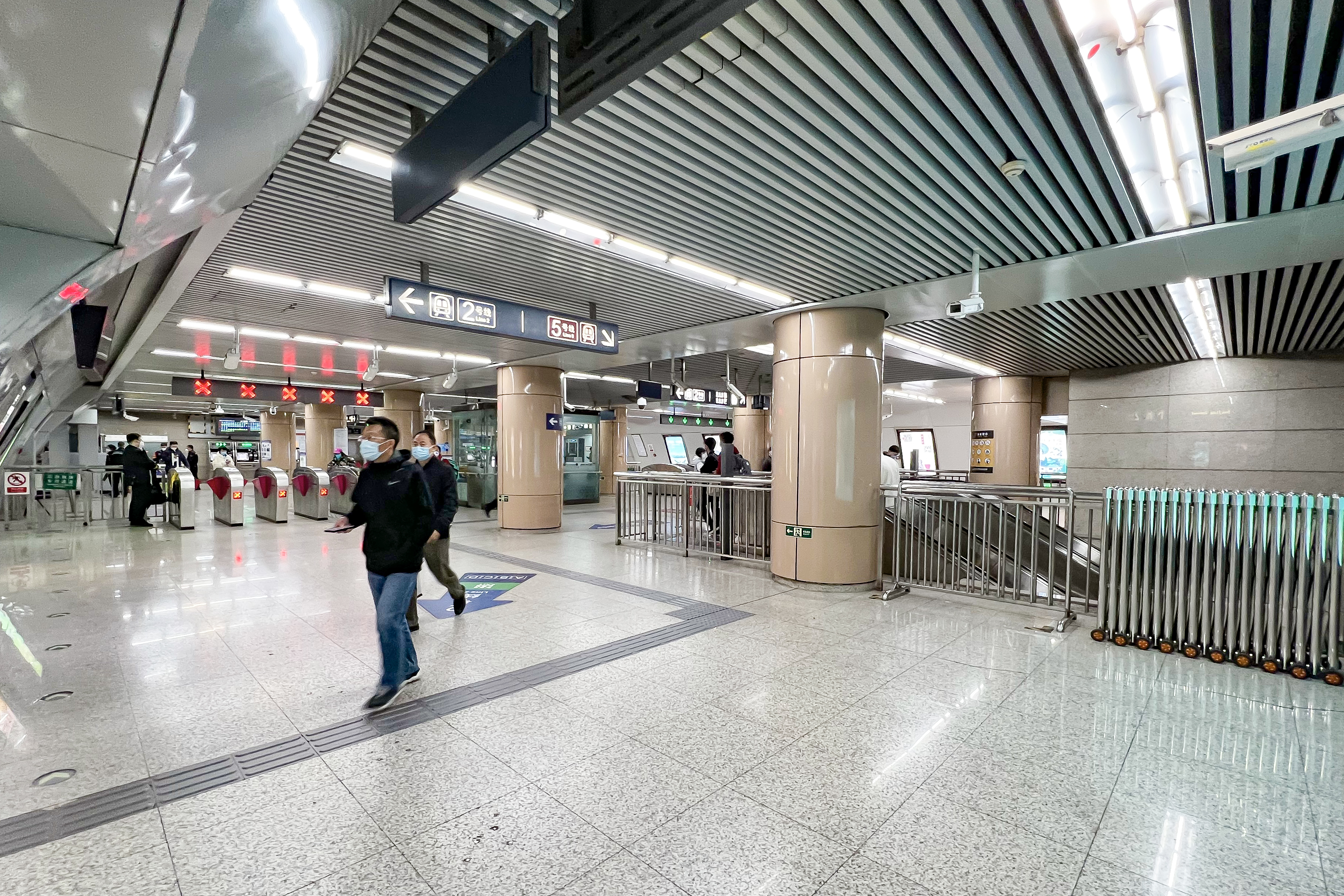
Line 5 north concourse

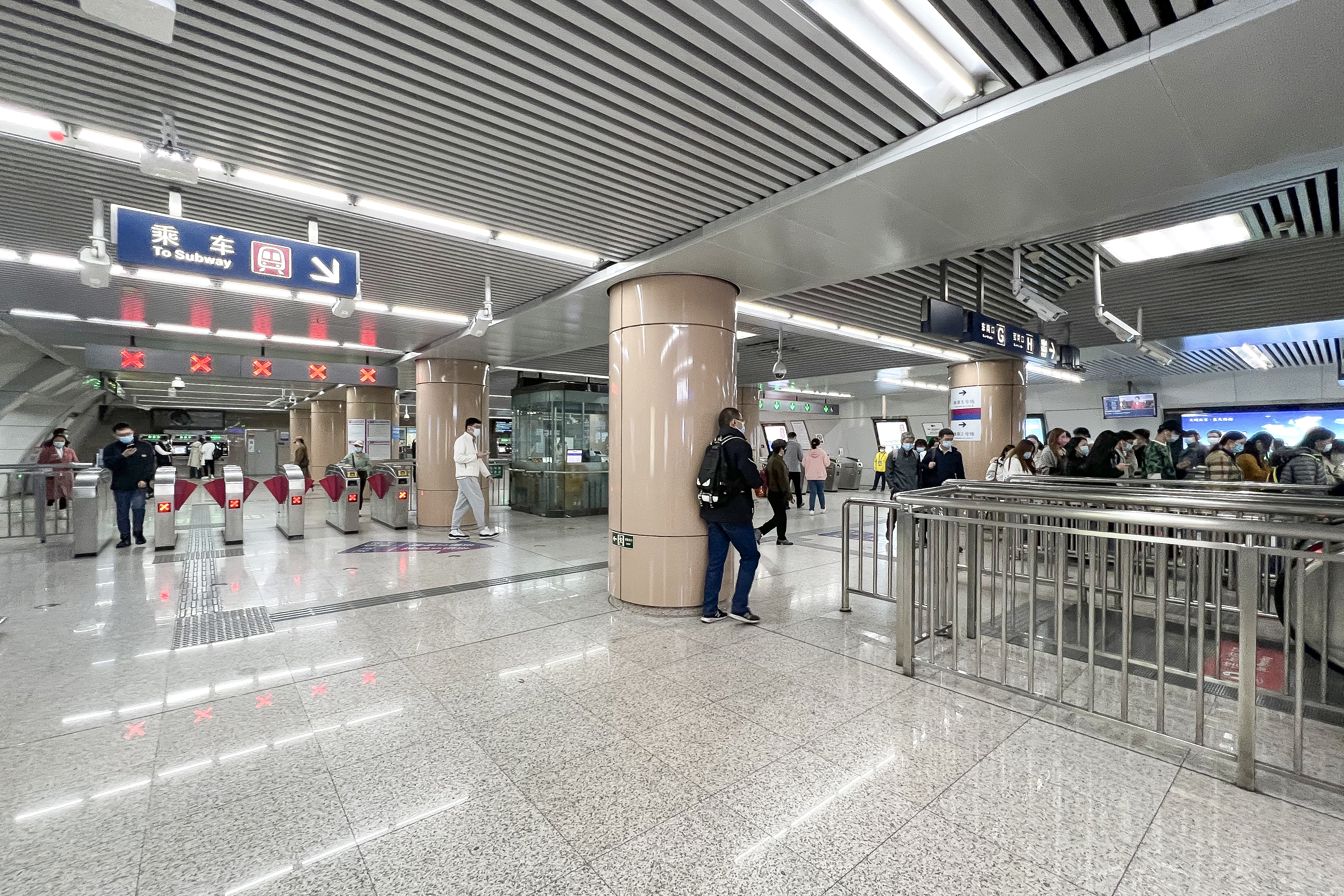
Line 5 south concourse
