= Flat peach =

Variety of peach

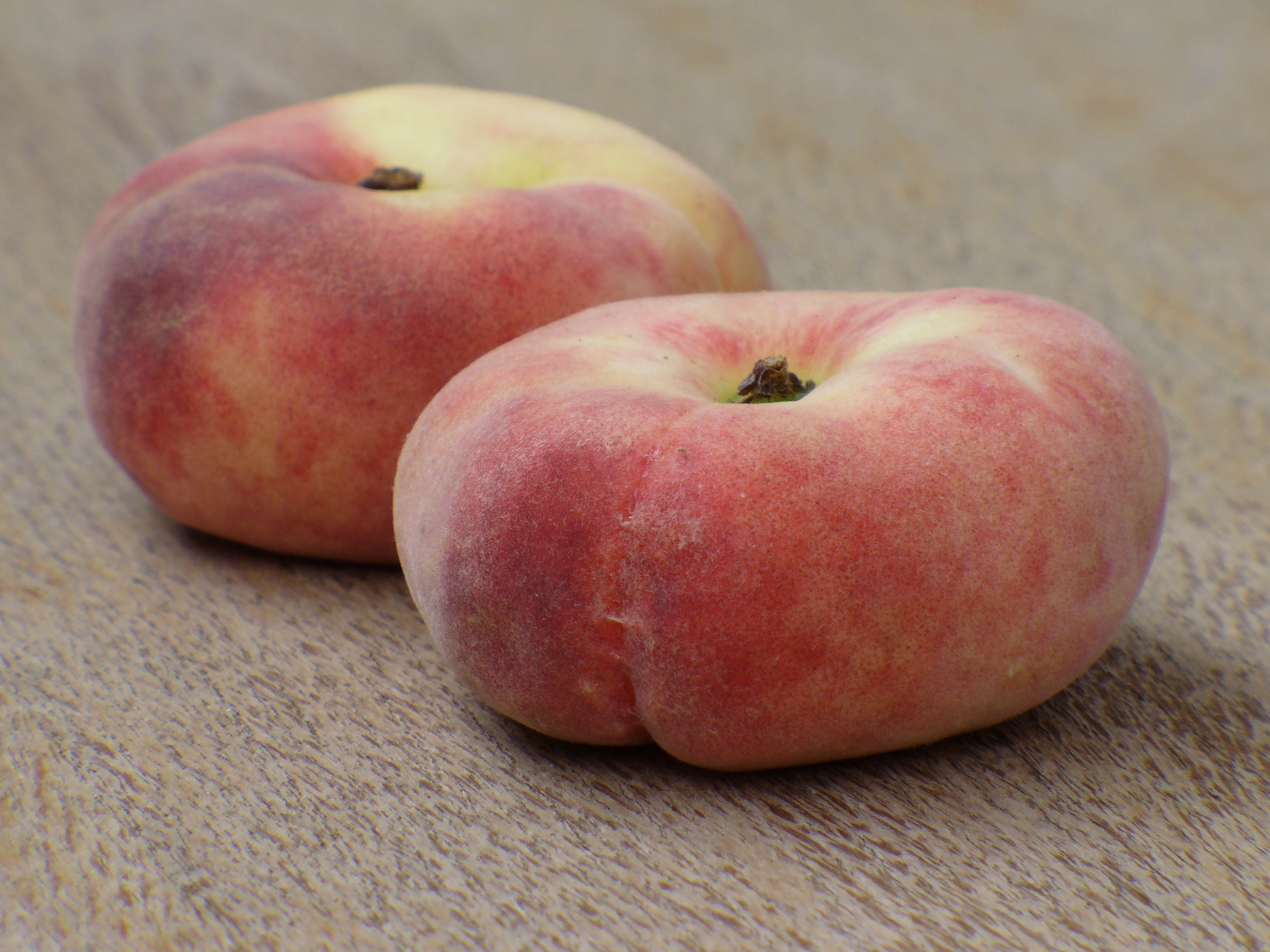
- Saturn peaches
- Variety: Prunus persica var. platycarpa
- Origin: China

The flat peach, (Prunus persica var. platycarpa, formerly also called var. compressa) also known as the doughnut/donut peach or Saturn peach, is a variety of peach with pale yellow fruit that is oblate in shape.

== Description ==
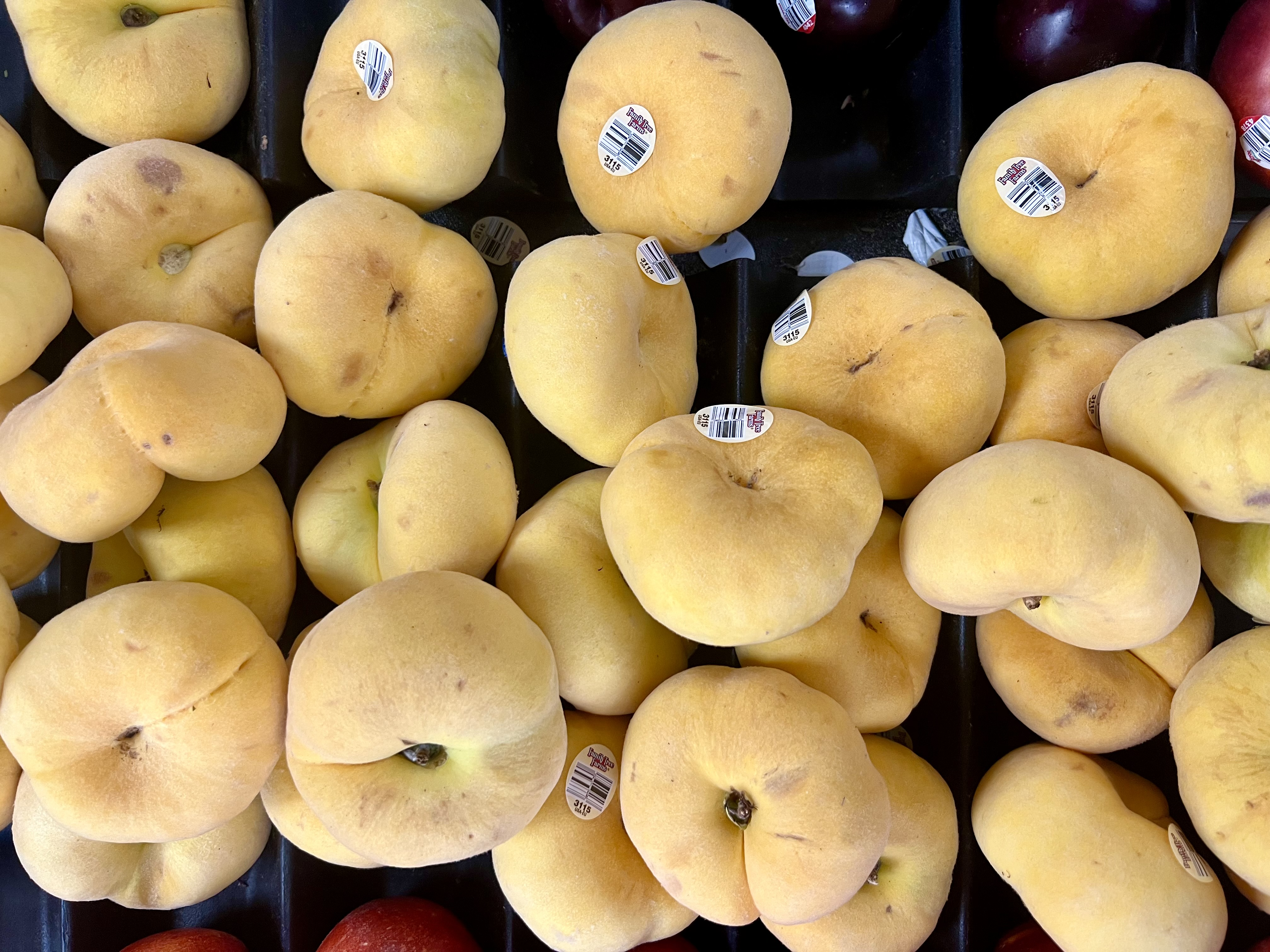
Yellow Doughnut Peaches

Flat peaches are flatter than fruit of more popular peach varieties. Their skin is yellow and red, and they are less fuzzy than many other peaches. The inside of the flat peach is white in appearance.

They are harvested in late spring through the end of summer.

Flat peaches are usually sweeter than other peaches, but still have a recognizable peach taste. They are said to be more complex-tasting and flavorful, often described as possessing undertones of almond.

== Other names ==
They are known by many other names, including doughnut peach or donut peach, paraguayo peach, pan tao peach, saucer peach, flat peach, belly-up peach, UFO peach, Chinese flat peach, hat peach, anjeer peach (meaning "fig peach"), custard peach, wild peach, white peach, pumpkin peach, squashed peach, bagel peach, or pita peach.

== History ==
Despite commonly being called paraguayos in trade, there were no peaches of any variety in Paraguay before the early-mid 16th century, and today's flat peach probably originated in China – supposedly in the 19th century, but this is merely the first time they came to widespread notice in Western countries. In China, it was known before then as pántáo (Chinese: 蟠桃; lit. 'coiled peach'), and made a significant appearance in the 16th-century novel Journey to the West, in which the Jade Emperor tasks Wukong to take charge of the Pan Tao Yuan ("Coiled Peaches Garden"). Later on, Wukong eats most of the rarer species of fruit in the garden and gains eternal life.

It was introduced to the United States from China in 1869. However, peaches with such a fruit shape have been noted even before the Modern Era: in the Kitāb aṣ-ṣaidana fi 'ṭ-ṭibb by al-Bīrūnī (973-1050), a particular variety of peach is described as being shaped as if squashed by a kafīt (a spatula for preparing barbecued dishes like kufta) from both ends, and containing a hazelnut-sized kernel with brittle shell – in other words, differing from a normal peach in exactly the same obvious details as does the flat peach of today. Al-Bīrūnī's work describes notable crops and medicinal plants focusing on the region between Mesopotamia and today's Pakistan, and considering how easily ripe peaches spoil in transport, this variety must have been local produce (while the kernel might still be recognizably different in a dried flat peach, the shape as described by al-Bīrūnī would not). Though al-Bīrūnī does not discuss a wide range of Chinese pharmacopoeia in his book, the central section of the Silk Road ran immediately to the north of the region where al-Bīrūnī's flat peaches were grown, and if today's flat peaches are not produced by convergent evolution, flat-peach seeds or young trees must have been traded between the Mideast and China for the fruit's novelty value more than a millennium ago already. In this case, though the direction of this trade is not readily determinable, they would be an heirloom variety more than 1000 years old.
