= Beijing Bus =

Public bus service in Beijing, China

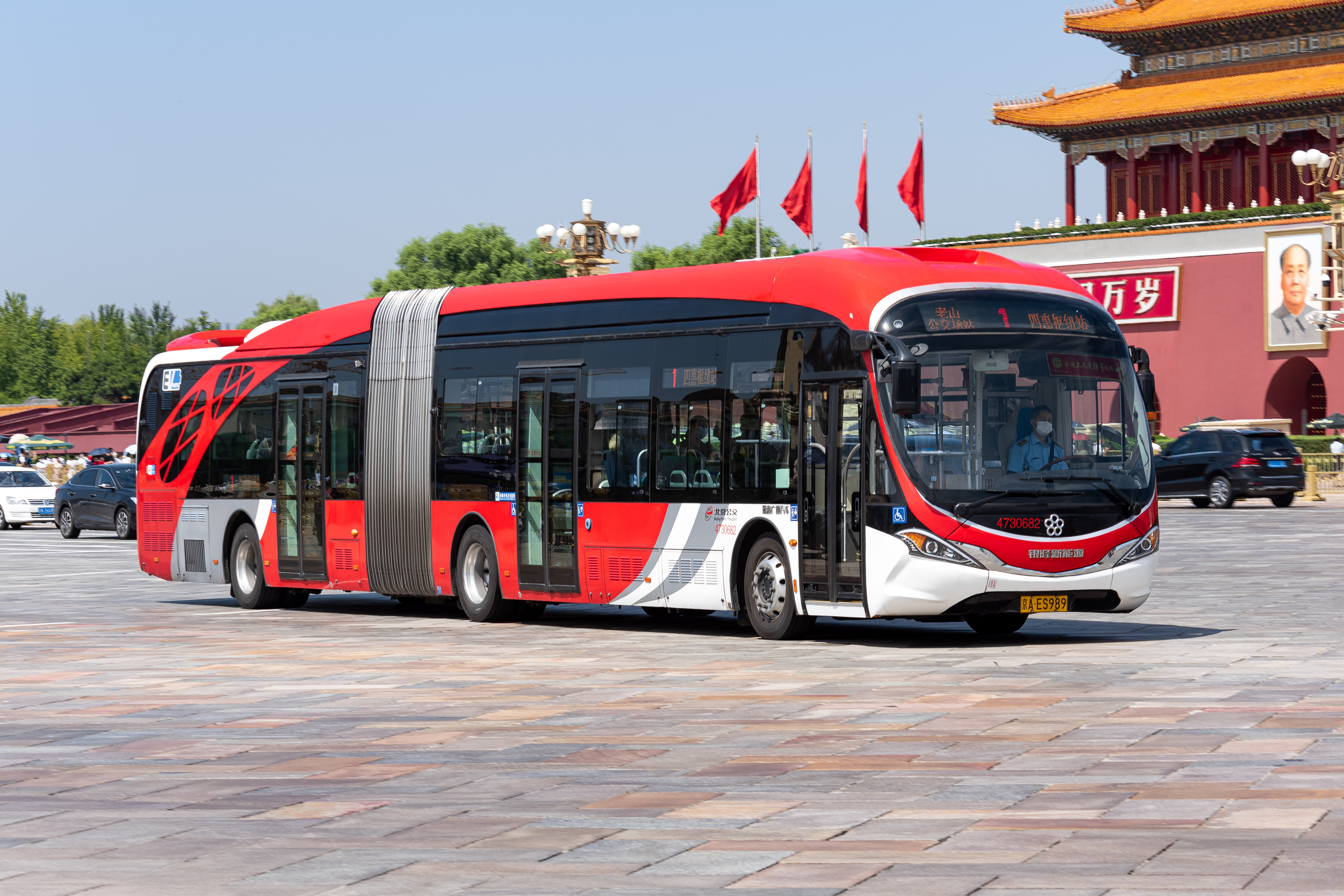
- Beijing Bus 1 on Chang'an Avenue at Tiananmen Square. The vehicle is produced by Zhuhai Guangtong Automobile.
- Parent: Beijing Public Transport Holdings, Ltd. ("BPT"); Beijing Xianglong Bus Co., Ltd. ("Yuntong")
- Founded: 1947 (BPT); 1999 (Yuntong)
- Headquarters: Beijing
- Locale: Beijing Municipality
- Service area: Beijing
- Service type: local, express, bus rapid transit, shuttle, night
- Routes: 1020 (BPT); 32 (Yuntong)
- Fleet: 29,515 (BPT); 1,413 (Yuntong)
- Daily ridership: 9,635,600 (BPT daily avg.); 684,931 (Yuntong daily avg.)
- Fuel type: trolleybus, diesel, diesel-electric hybrid, CNG, hydrogen
- Website: BPT; Yuntong

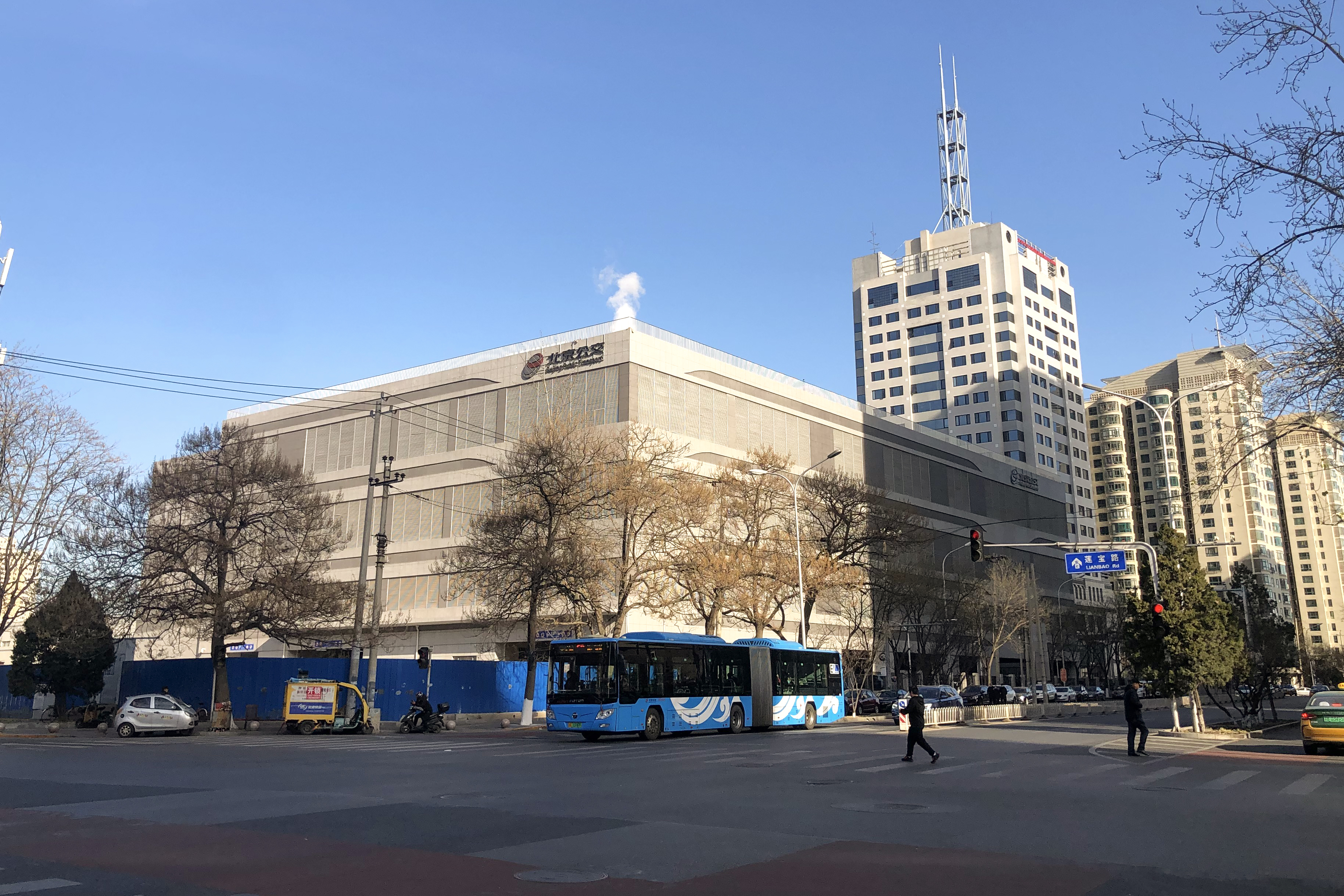
Headquarters of Beijing Public Transport, the major bus company in Beijing

Public bus service in Beijing is among the most extensive, widely used and affordable form of public transportation in urban and suburban districts of the city. In 2015, the entire network consisted of 876 routes with a fleet of 24,347 buses and trolleybuses carrying 3.98 billion passengers annually. Trolleybuses run on over 30 routes including 6, 38, 42, 65, 101-112, 114-118, 124, 128, 301, and BRT 1-3. Many of these trolleybus routes are located inside the Third Ring Road but some, such as 301 and BRT 1-3, extend as far out as the Fifth Ring Road. Since 2013, in an effort to reduce urban air pollution, Beijing has been converting regular bus routes to trolleybus routes by installing overhead power lines on several corridors. Public bus service in the city began in 1921. Today there are two operators. The city's primary public bus operator, the state-owned Beijing Public Transport Holdings, Ltd. operates the Bus Service.

The bus fare begins at RMB(¥)2.00 and are subject to a 50 percent discount when purchased with the mass transit IC card, Yikatong, using the QR-code of Alipay and the official app of the Beijing Public Transport or the transit card from Apple's Wallet, which effectively lowers the cost all buses to ¥1.00.

Beijing Airport Buses provide separate service to the city's two airports.

== Basic information ==
=== Fares ===
Under the new fare scheme implemented on December 28, 2014, bus fares cost RMB(¥)2.00 for the first 10 km and ¥1.00 for each additional 5 km. Yikatong card and phone users are entitled to a 50% discount and students enjoy a 75% discount.

Prior to the fare hike, bus fares were as low as ¥1 and the Yikatong discount was 60%.

Riders carrying bulky luggage that take up the space of another passenger will have to purchase a second bus fare. A child below the height of 1.4m rides for free when accompanied by a paying rider. Bearers of Retired Cadres' Honorary Certificates and blind individuals can also ride public buses for free.

==== Buying tickets ====
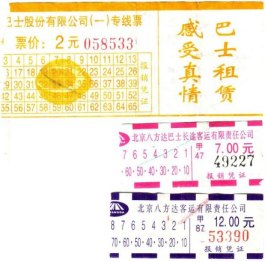

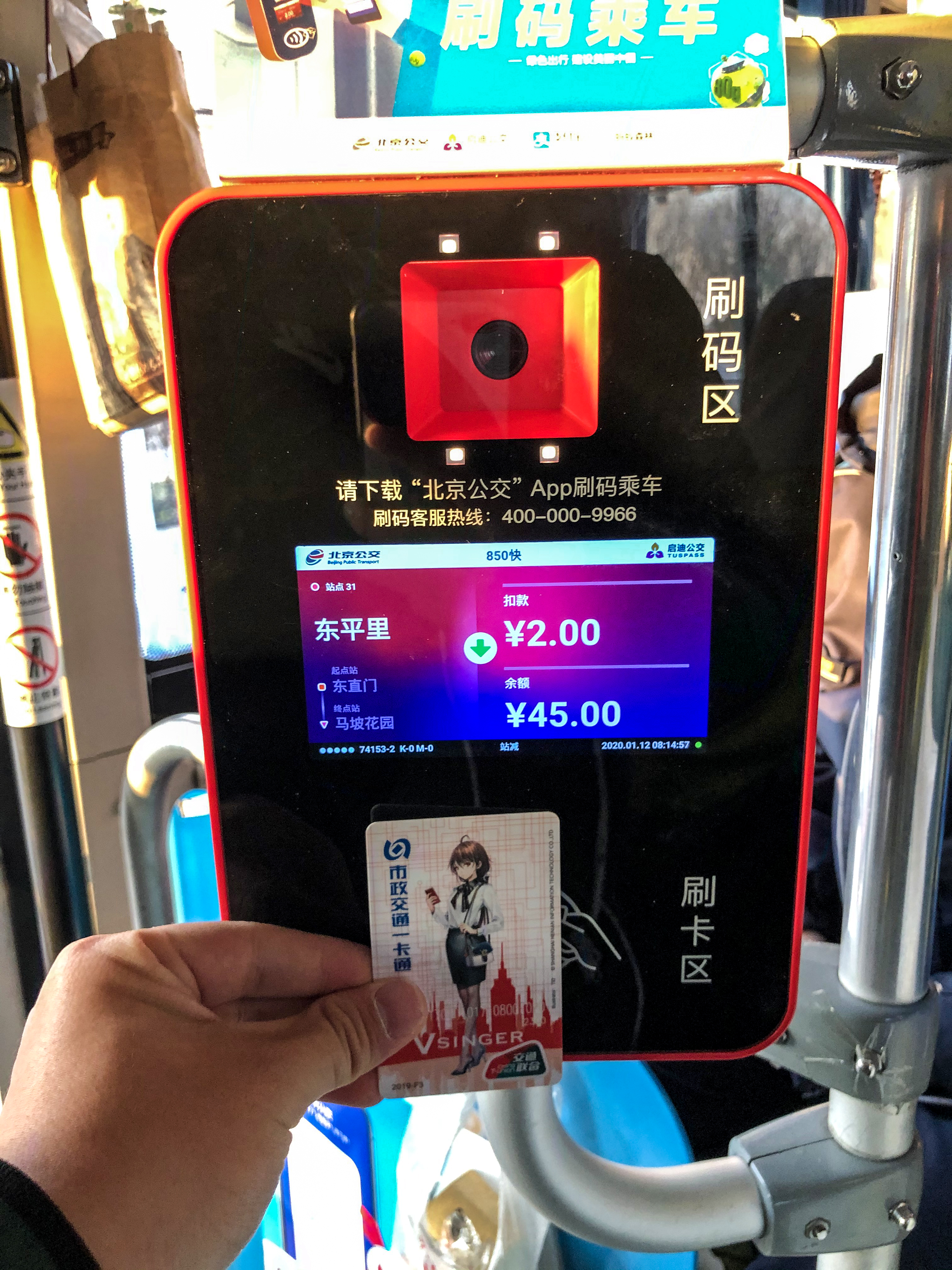
Riders using the Yikatong card enjoy 50% off the standard cash bus fare.

Right: Paper tickets sold on buses with ticket clerks. The upper ticket costs ¥2. The lower tickets, costing ¥7 and ¥12, are used on longer-distance routes.

On buses with a ticket clerk on board, the clerk can sell paper tickets and give exact change. The ticket clerk will ask riders deboarding the bus to show the paper ticket they had purchased, their bus pass or swipe their discount card. On bus routes designated as having no ticket clerks (无人售票), riders must pay exact fare in cash, show the driver their bus pass, or swipe a discount card when they board and deboard the bus.

==== Discount card ====
Riders paying with the Yikatong metrocard receive 50% discount off the cash fare. Hence, with a Yikatong card, the starting becomes ¥1.00 per ride. Riders with the student metro card enjoy 75% discount off the cash fare, the starting becomes ¥0.50 per ride. Riders must swipe twice, both on boarding and deboarding the bus, so the trip distance can be calculated.

Until the introduction of the Yikatong metrocard in 2006, Beijing Bus Passes were a popular choice for discounted bus fare. Bus passes are available for three days (¥10 for a maximum of 18 rides), seven days (¥20 for 42 rides), 15 days (¥40 for 90 rides). The Yikatong has no expiration date and has a lower per ride cost. The Yikatong card can be purchased or have value added at any Beijing Subway station or at any of 89 bus stops around the city. Nowadays, there are no more bus passes.

=== Hours ===
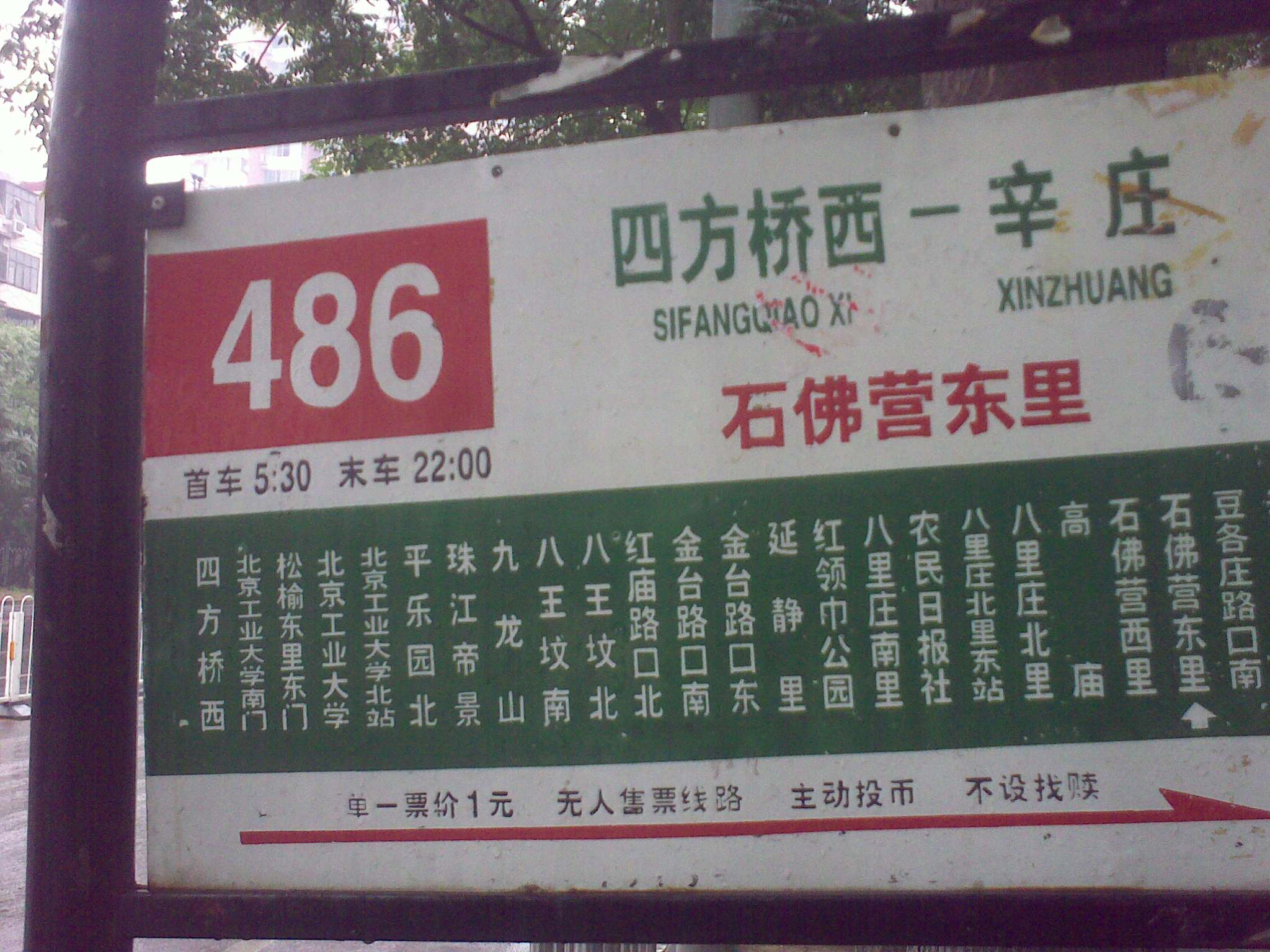
Beijing bus sign showing the bus route number (486), hours of service (5:30 - 22:00), name of the stop (Shifoying Dongli 石佛营东里), terminus (Sifangqiao Xi & Xinzhuang), fare schedule (flat rate ¥1, exact fare), stops along route, and direction of travel (red arrow pointing toward Xinzhuang)

Service on most bus lines begins between 5:00 and 6:00 and end between 20:00 and 23:00. The 夜-series night bus lines begin service at 23:20 and run until between 4:30 and 5:00.

=== Bus stops ===
Bus stops are marked with route signs that indicate the name of the stop, route number, hours of operation, fare schedule and each stop on the route. Bus route signs are only in Chinese.

=== Boarding protocol ===
On buses with two doors, the front door is used for entry and the back door for deboarding. On articulated buses and tri-axle buses with three doors, the middle door is used for entry and the front and rear doors for deboarding.

=== Routes ===
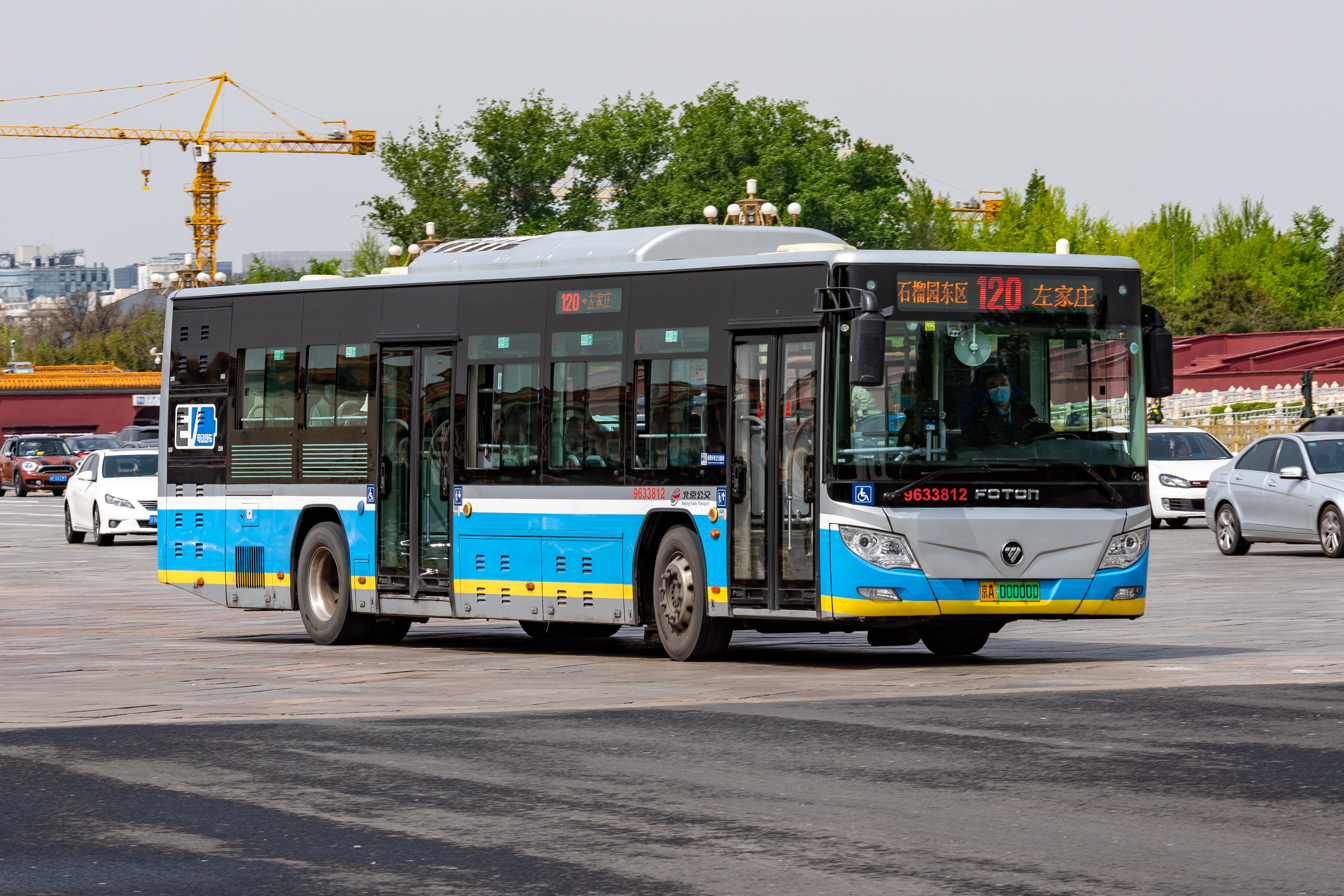
Route 120, a downtown route, using electric buses

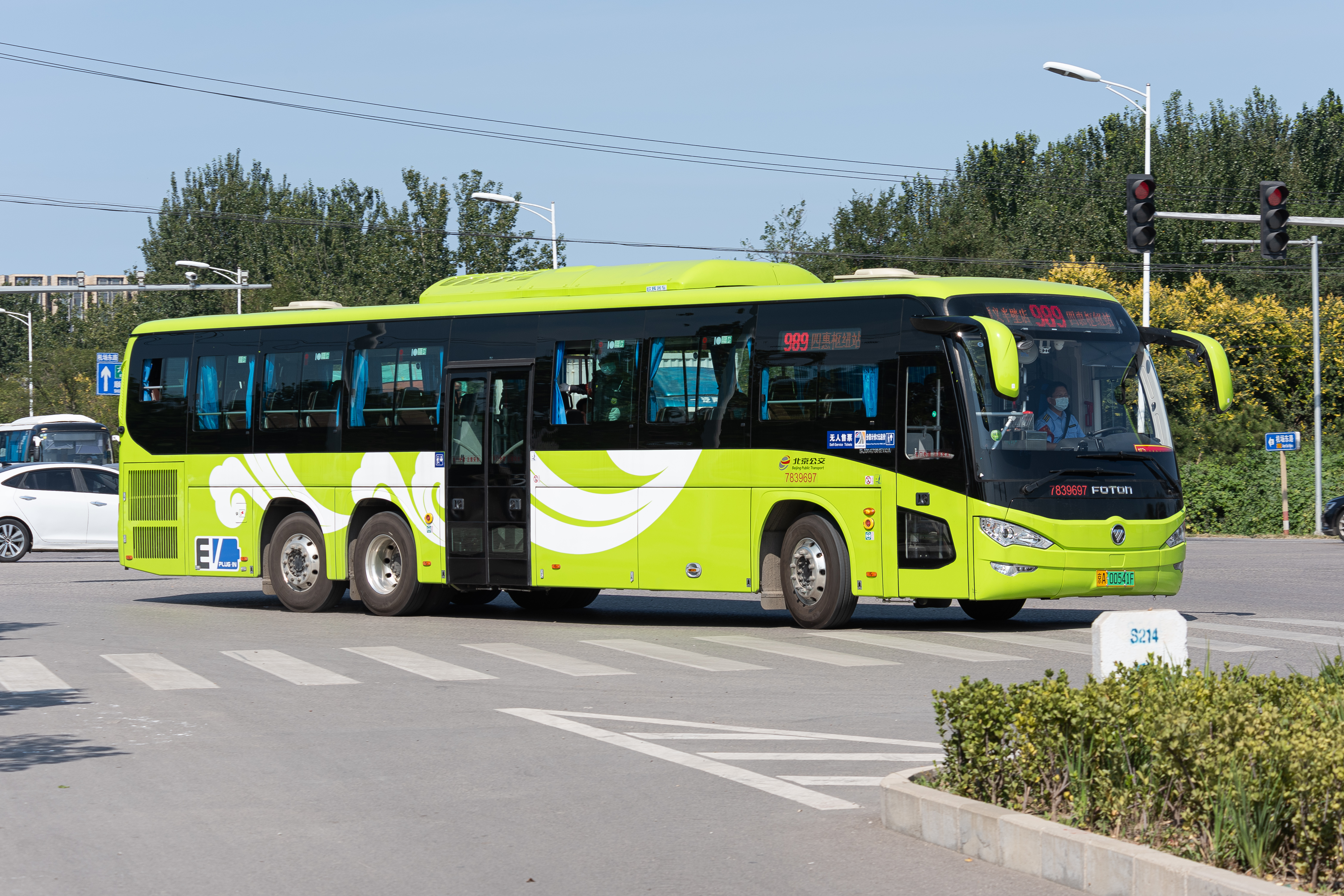
A bus on Route 989, using a three axle model

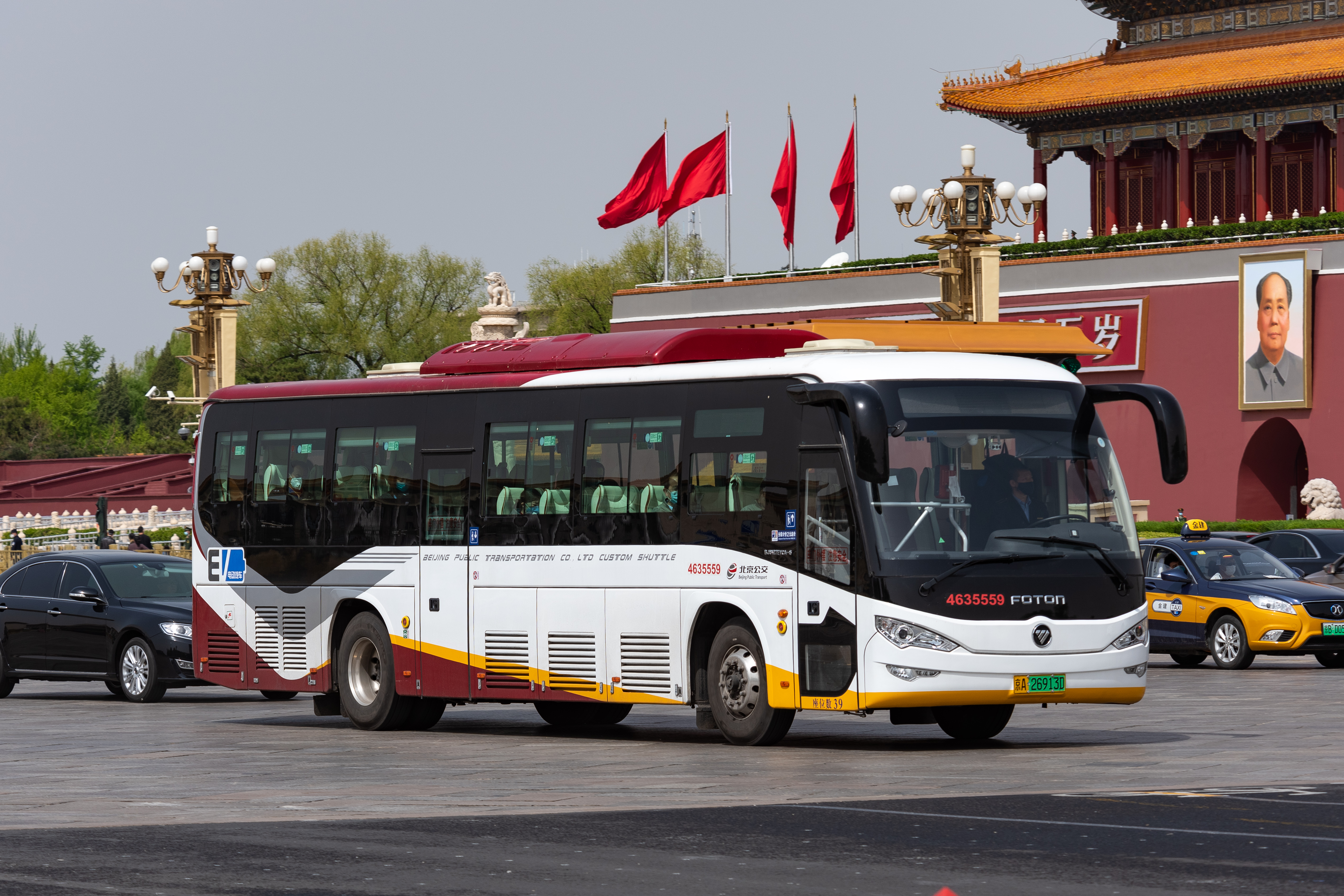
Custom shuttle bus run by Beijing Public Transport

BPT's buses use the following route number scheme and fare schedule. Route numbers are often displayed using seven-segment displays on older buses.

Line No.	Line Description
1-200^{[f]}	Bus mostly routes in the city's urban core district, including most trolleybus lines. Special cases include lines 81 and 138 whose routes are mostly outside the 4th Ring Road.
300-599	Bus routes that run through both the urban core and suburbs (eg. line 431, 505, etc) or in the suburbs (eg. line 314, 357, etc)
601-698	Relatively long bus routes that run through both the urban core and suburbs (eg. line 615, 634, etc) or in the suburbs (eg. line 655, 642, etc).
804-997^{[a]}	Bus routes that run to distant suburbs, including over 40 routes to Hebei Province.
快速公交1-4 BRT	The prefix 快速公交 (kuàisù gōngjiāo) designates the bus rapid transit (BRT) routes which run on bus-only lanes for most of their length. BRT Lines 1-3 use trolleybuses.
观光1-3 Tourism	The prefix 观光 (guānguāng), meaning "tourism" or "sight-see", designates three bus routes that operate around popular tourist sites such as the Forbidden City, Tian'anman Square, the Summer Palace, and the Olympic Park.
专3-231^{[b]} Shuttle	The prefix 专 (zhuān), meaning "shuttle", denotes short shuttle bus routes that serve particular neighborhoods. Their number scheme is distinct from other buses, such that Bus 专59 follows a different route from Beijing Bus 59.
夜1-38^{[d]} Night	The prefix 夜 (yè), meaning "night", denotes buses serving the urban core and some of the larger suburbs that run from 23:20 to 4:50. Their number scheme is distinct from other buses, such that Bus 夜26 follows a different route from Beijing Bus 26. 夜10, 夜20, 夜30 are loop lines.

Other character designations in line numbers:

- Suffix 快 (kuài), which means "fast", indicates express service. For example, Bus 345 is a regular bus. Bus 345快 is an express bus that follows the same route but makes fewer stops.
- Suffixes 内 (nèi), meaning "inner", and 外 (wài) meaning "outer" refer to the direction of loop route buses. Inner loop buses run in a clock-wise direction. Outer loop buses run in a counterclockwise direction. For example, Bus 300内 goes clock-wise around the 3rd Ring Road while Bus 300外 goes counterclock-wise.
- Suffix 支 (zhī), meaning "branch", indicates a branch route that overlaps in part with the main route.
- Prefix 临 (lín), meaning "temporary", indicates a temporary route.

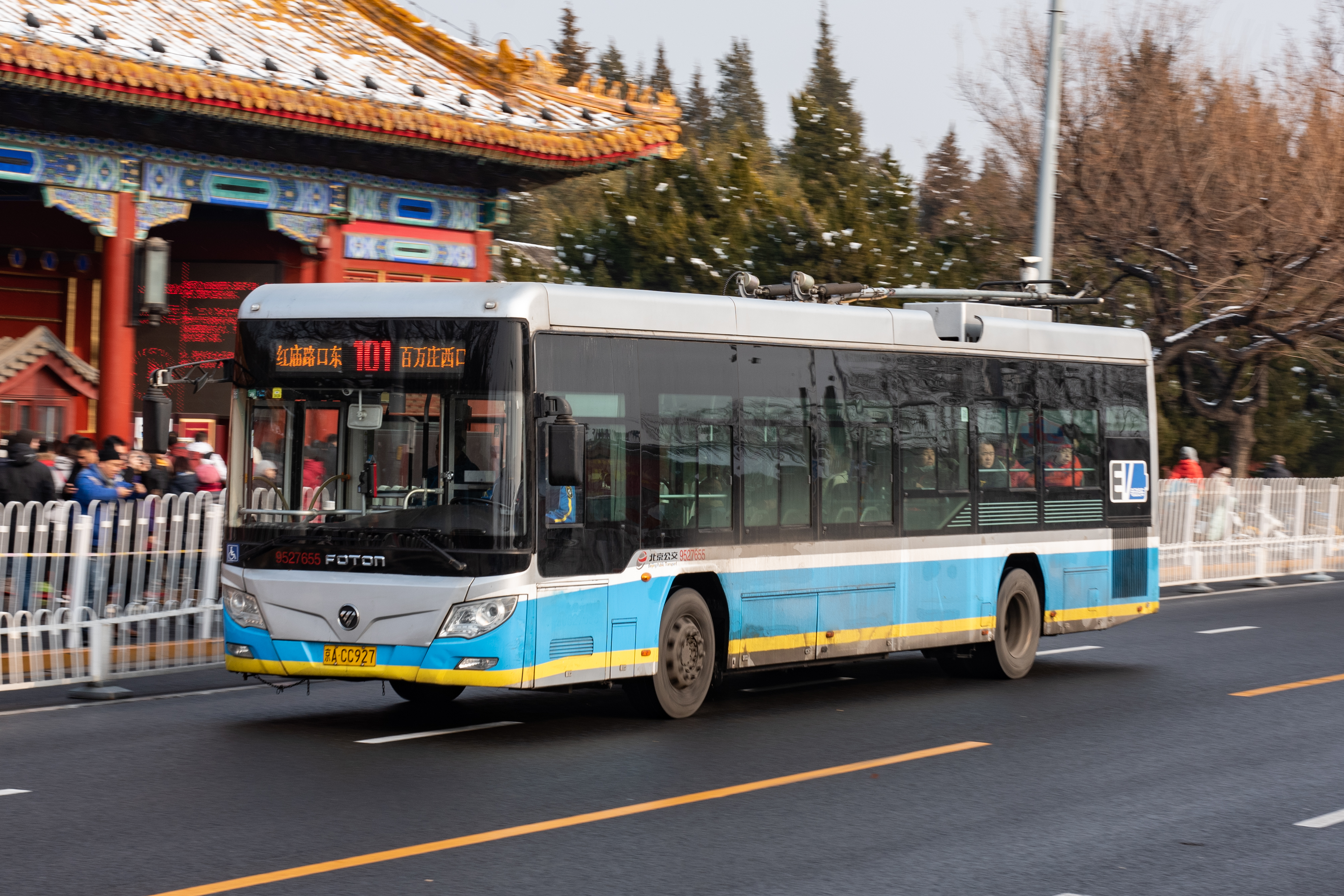
Beijing Trolleybus 101

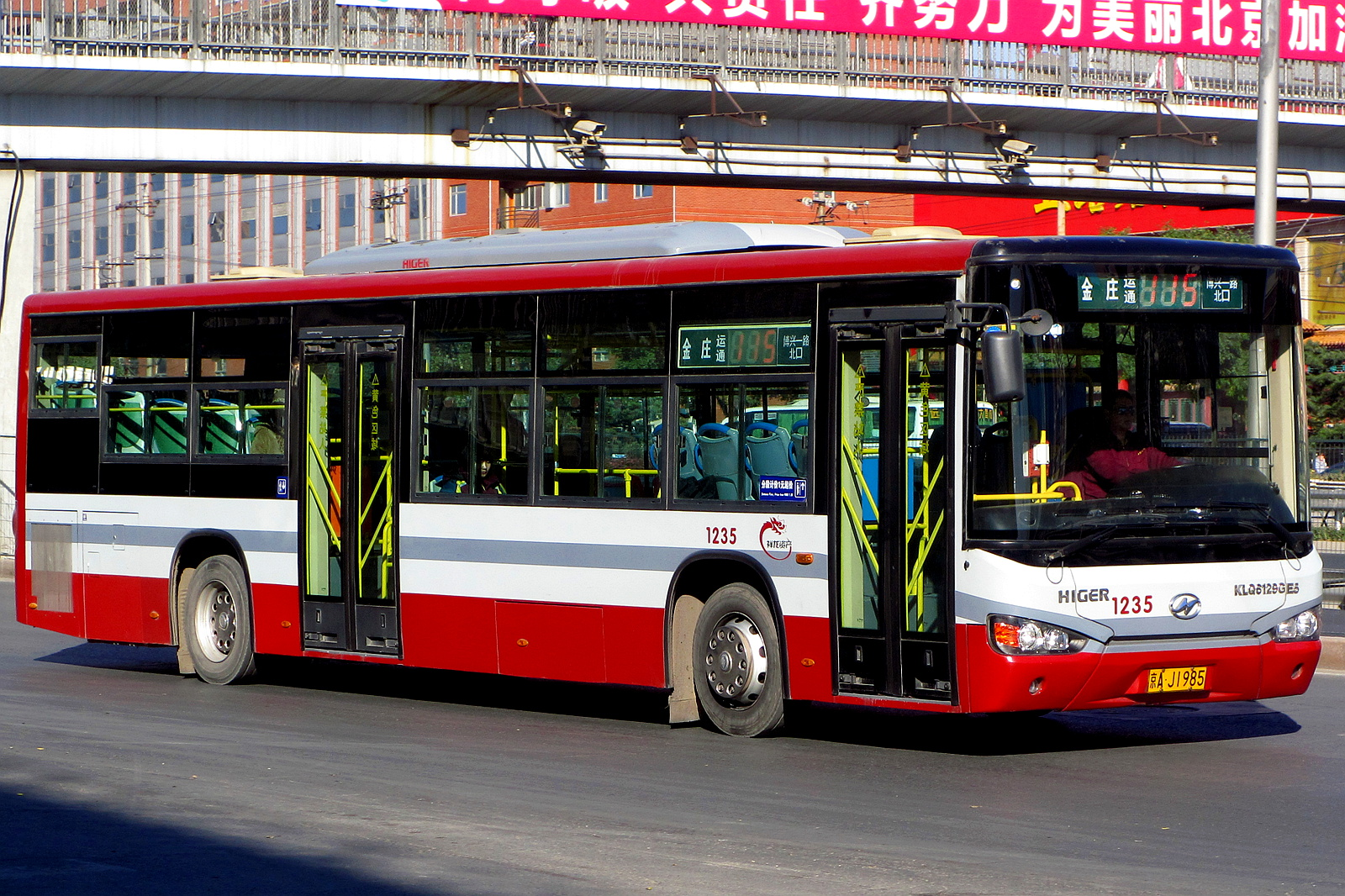
Yuntong (运通) Bus 115 (now 685)

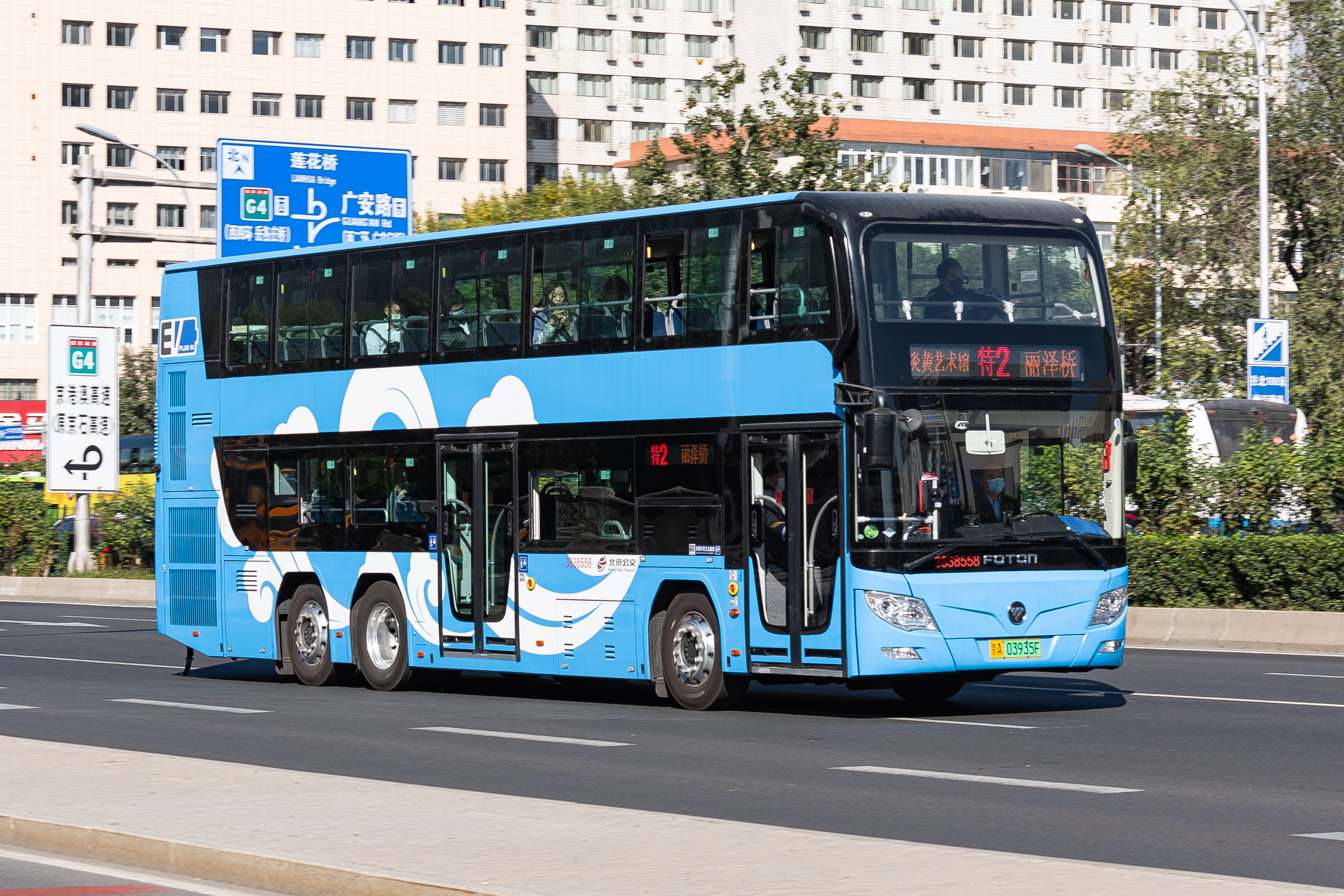
Double decker Bus 特2 (now 142)

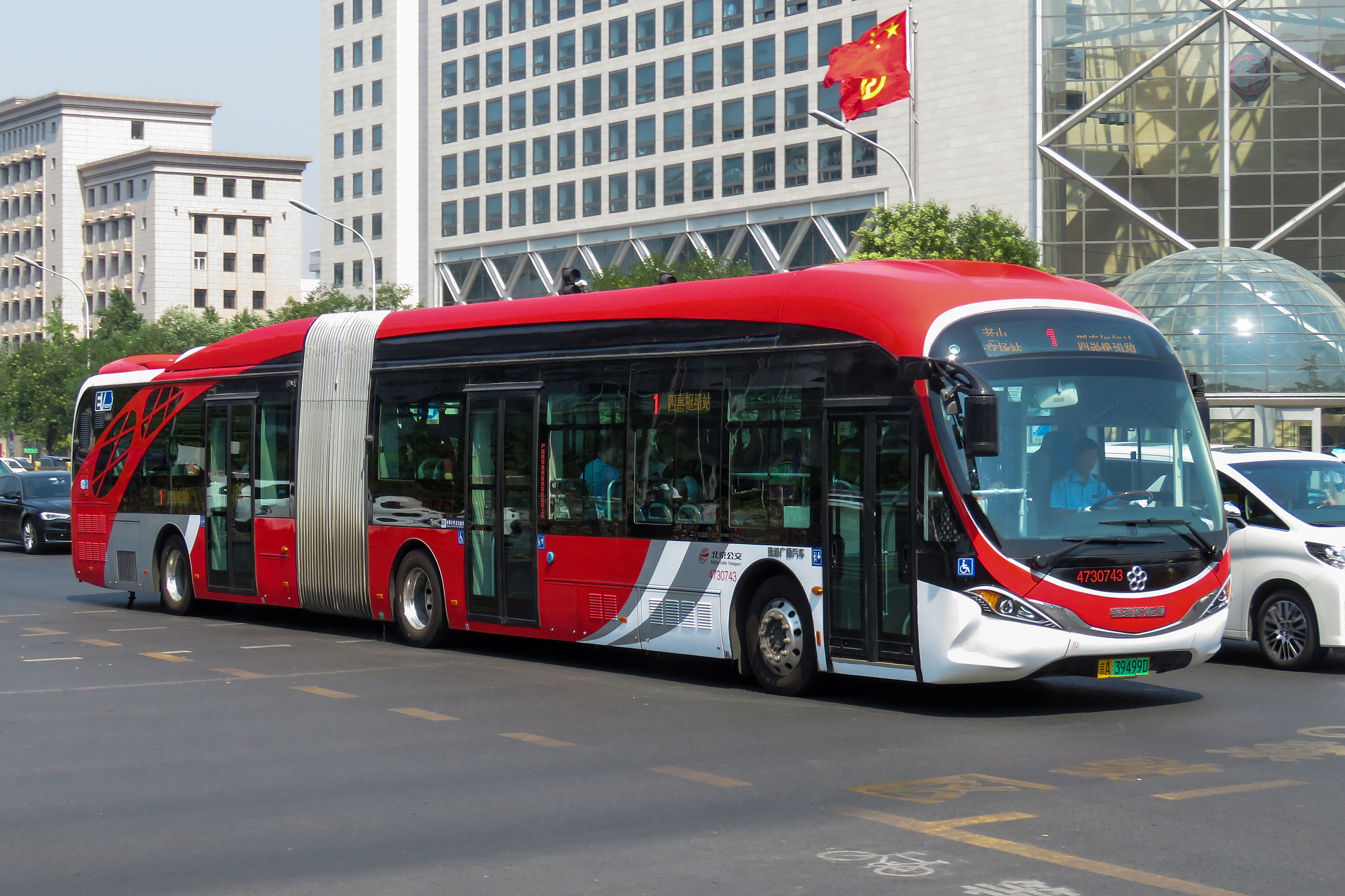
New articulated bus for Route 1 in 2017

=== Bus route enquiry service ===
The BPT provides inquiry services via both its official website and the 96166 telephone helpline.

=== Free Wi-Fi service ===
As of August 17, 2013, free wi-fi service is available on 5,823 buses on 248 bus routes, mostly inside the Third Ring Road. By December 2, 2014, about 12,000 buses had been outfitted with free Wi-Fi service.

=== Bus Rapid Transit ===
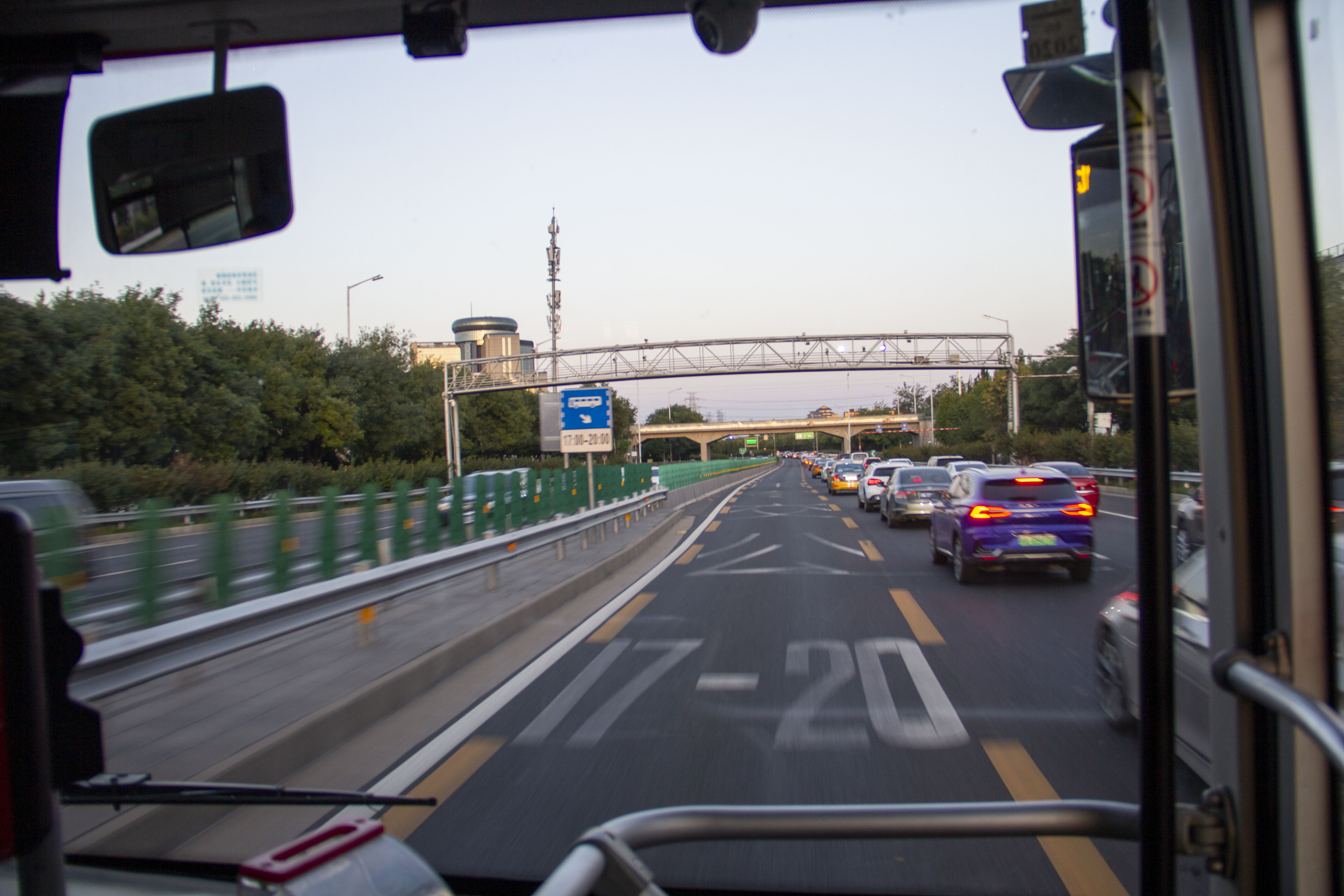
Highway bus lane on the Jingtong Expressway.

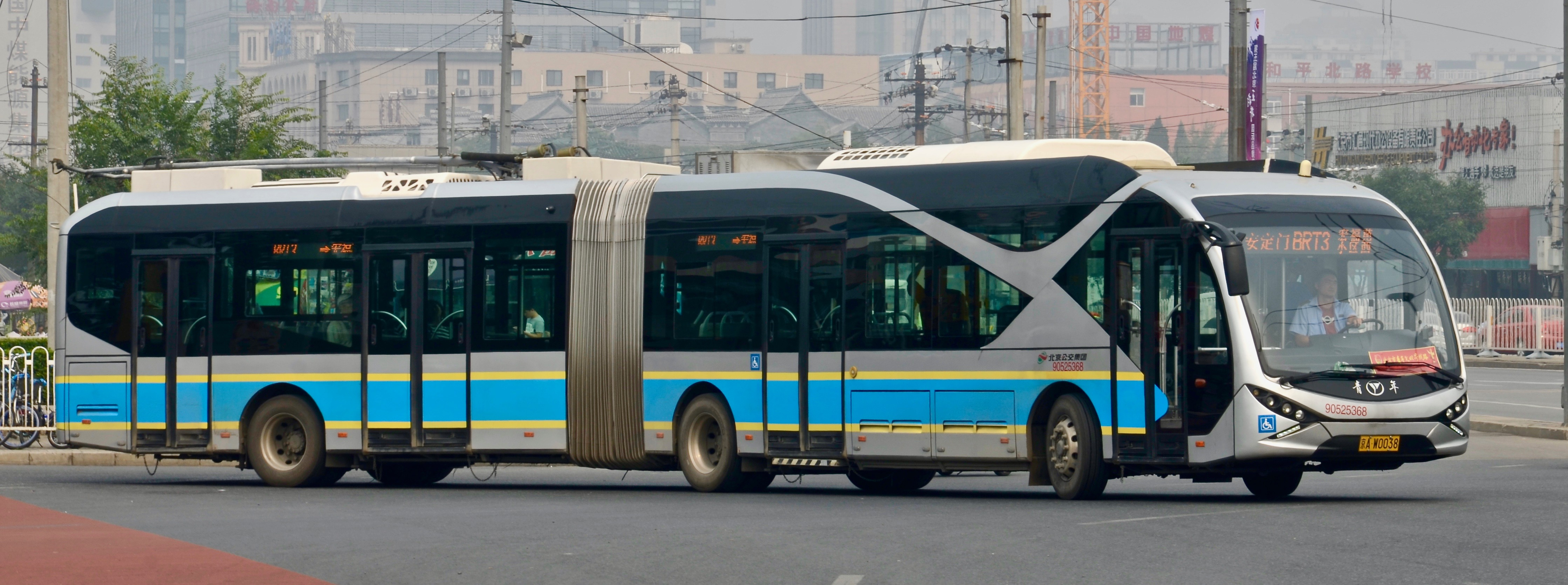
An eBRT 3 turning at its Andingmen Terminal

Beijing has four bus rapid transit lines intended to complement its extensive subway system and a fifth one under construction on Guangqu Road. The four lines radiate from the central city in each cardinal direction. Additionally, there are expressway median bus lanes on the Beijing–Tongzhou Expressway, and the urban sections of the G4 Jinggang'ao and G6 Jingzang expressways. The entire 3rd Ring Road also has curbside bus lanes which were criticized for poor design due to conflicts with traffic using on and off ramps. The lanes on the Jingzang Expressway see as much as 150 buses an hour during the AM peak period.

==== Line 1 ====
Line BRT 1 opened on December 30, 2005 and is one of China's first BRT lines. The line heads south from Qianmen to Demaozhuang (in Daxing District) in the south and is about 16 km long with 17 stations. It runs on bus lanes in the center of the road. All stations on the line are island platforms so specially designed buses with doors on the left are used on the line. It is the only route to use left-door buses. In 2009, it had an average daily ridership of 150,000 passengers. In 2015, the line was upgraded to use trolleybuses.

==== Line 2 ====
Line BRT 2 opened on July 31, 2008 and connects Chaoyangmen to Yangzha (near Guǎnzhuang station, in Chaoyang District) in the east. The line is 16 km long and has 20 stations. In 2017, the line was upgraded to use trolleybuses.

==== Line 3 ====
Line BRT 3 opened on July 20, 2008 and connects Andingmen to Hongfuyuanxiaoqu West (in Changping District) in the north. The line is 22.95 km long with 22 stations but only the northern half is on dedicated lanes. In early 2015, the line was upgraded to use trolleybuses, becoming Asia's first eBRT.

==== Line 4 ====
Line BRT 4 opened on December 30, 2012 and connects Fuchengmen to Longquan West in Mentougou District in the west. The line is 25.5 km long with 19 stations, but only the middle section of the routes has dedicated BRT lanes.

== Operators ==
The Beijing Bus network is made up by one main operator (Beijing Public Transport), but in some suburbs they have other operators, a list of which can be seen below.

- Changping- Wanjiatong
- Shunyi- Lunma
- Miyun- Baocheng
- Pinggu- Lufenda
- Daxing- Xingshunda
- Airport Buses- Conggang Buses

There are also some "Jiao" Buses that are operated by multiple different companies as well as the "Mini" buses in Daxing.

Additionally, there is also a small list of defunct operators that got merged into the BPT network. Here is a list below.

- Beijing- Xianglong
- Yizhuang- Boyutong
- Fangshan- Kaidefeng
- Tongzhou (the most recent)- Hengji

*Note that there are direct translations so the real names are different.

== History ==
Škoda 8Tr and BK540 trolleybuses, types built in the late 1950s, at a terminus in 1977

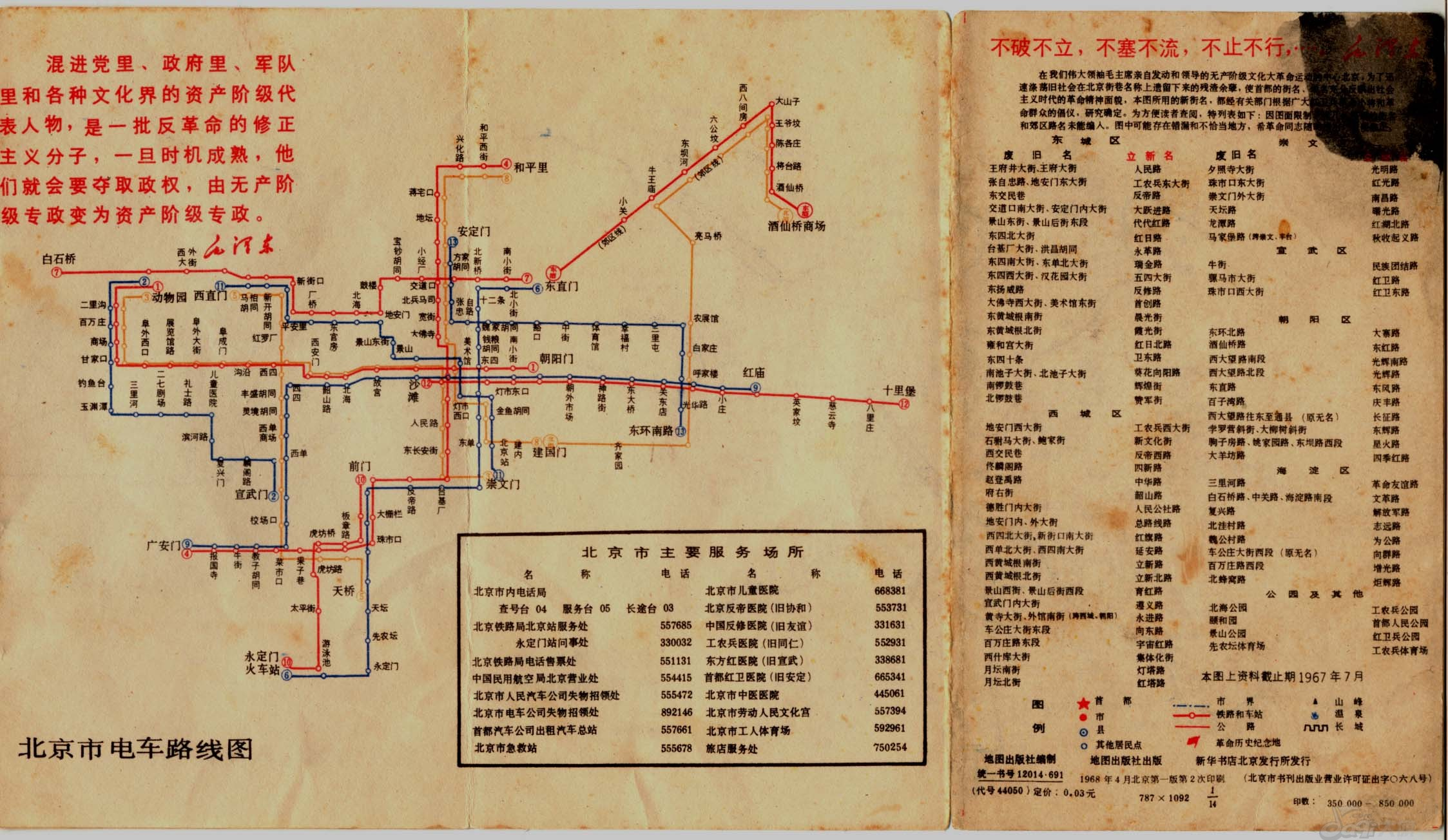
1968 trolleybus map of Beijing

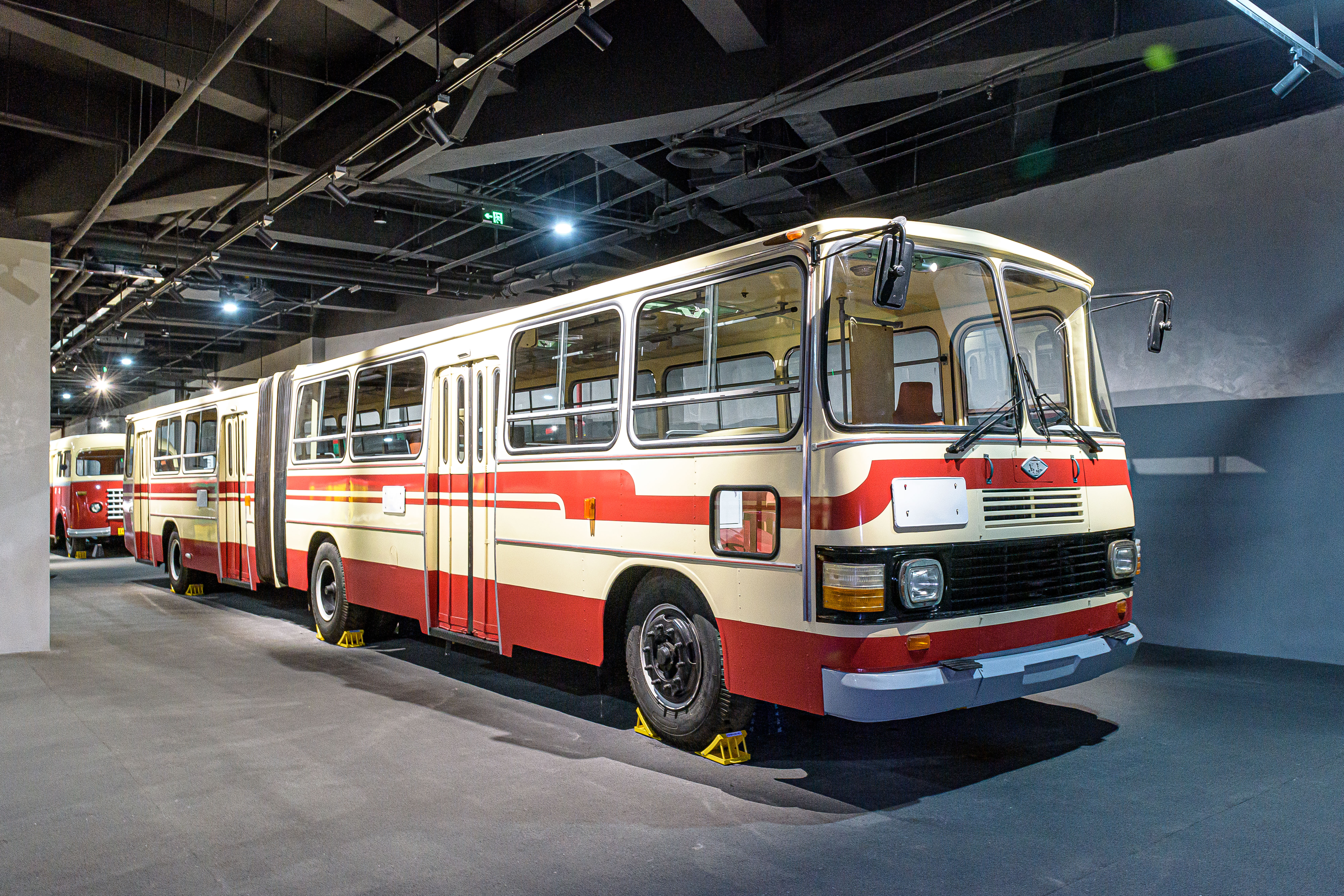
Replica of BK670, the mainstream bus model of Beijing Public Transport from 1979 to 2000

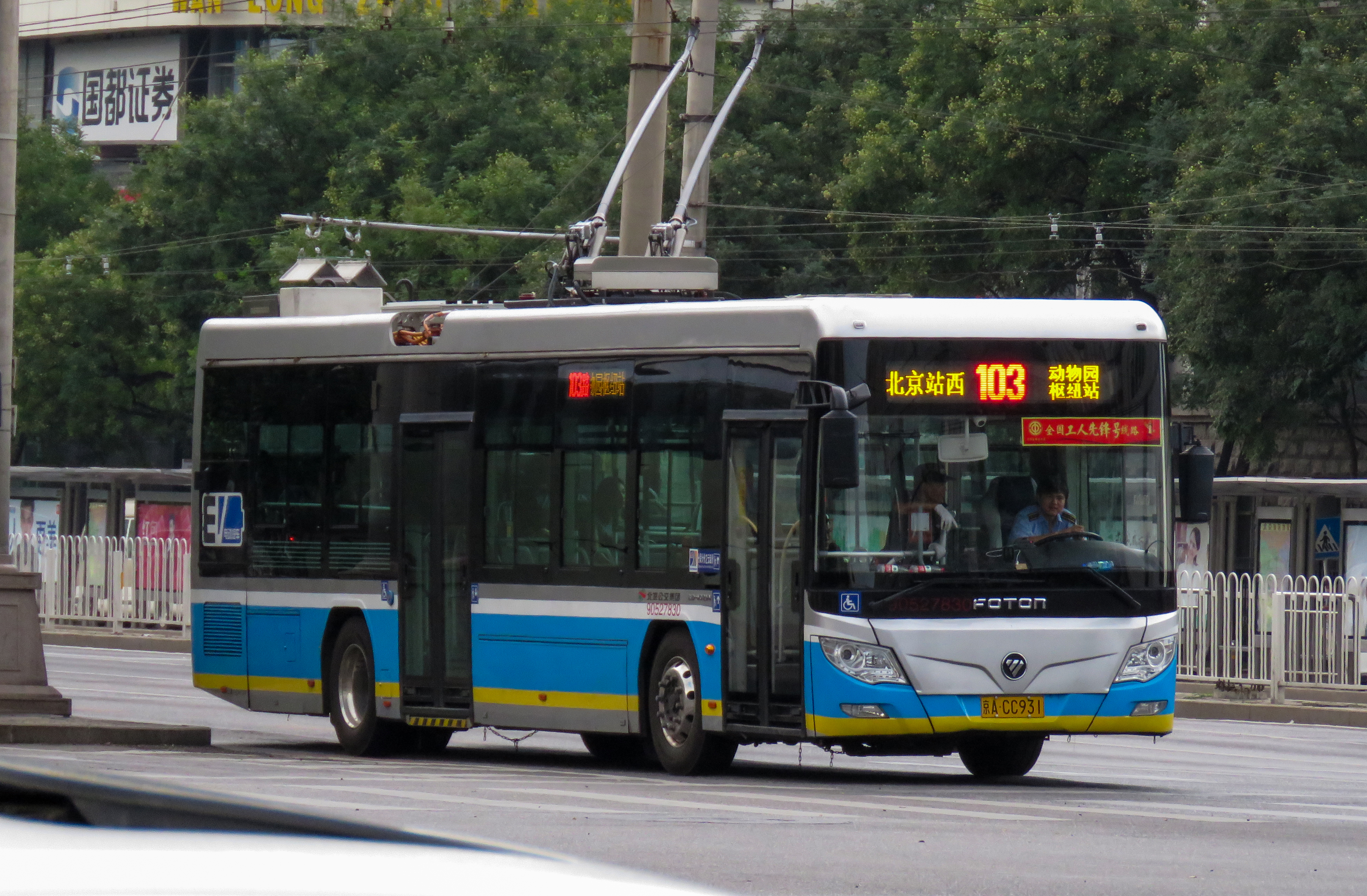
Trolleybus 103 on Zhanlan Road

Public bus service in Beijing dates to 1921 when the Beiyang Government established a trolley company in the city. Tram service began in the city in 1924. The first bus route in Beijing was launched in 1925 when the Beiping Bus Preparatory Committee acquired 30 buses for the city. In 1947, the Beiping Municipal Bus Company was established with 133 buses, but the company shut down in August 1949 during the Chinese Civil War with 79 broken down buses and only five working buses. In January 1949, after the capture of Beiping by the People's Liberation Army in the Beiping-Tianjin Campaign, there were only 103 trams and 61 buses in the city, which delivered 28.85 million trips that year. From November 1949 to March 1950, 88 U.S.-made Dodge T234 buses were shipped from Shanghai and became the mainstay of the Beijing bus fleet. Due to fuel shortages caused by a US-imposed trade embargo, the buses were converted to burn wood.

In the early 1950s, the bus fleet expanded with imports from Eastern Europe, including 76 Ikarus Bus from Hungary. Among the most advanced vehicles were Škoda buses from Czechoslovakia, which could carry 50 passengers and reach a speed of 60 km/h. A total of 52 Škoda-built trolleybuses were acquired, all being of that maker's 8Tr model.

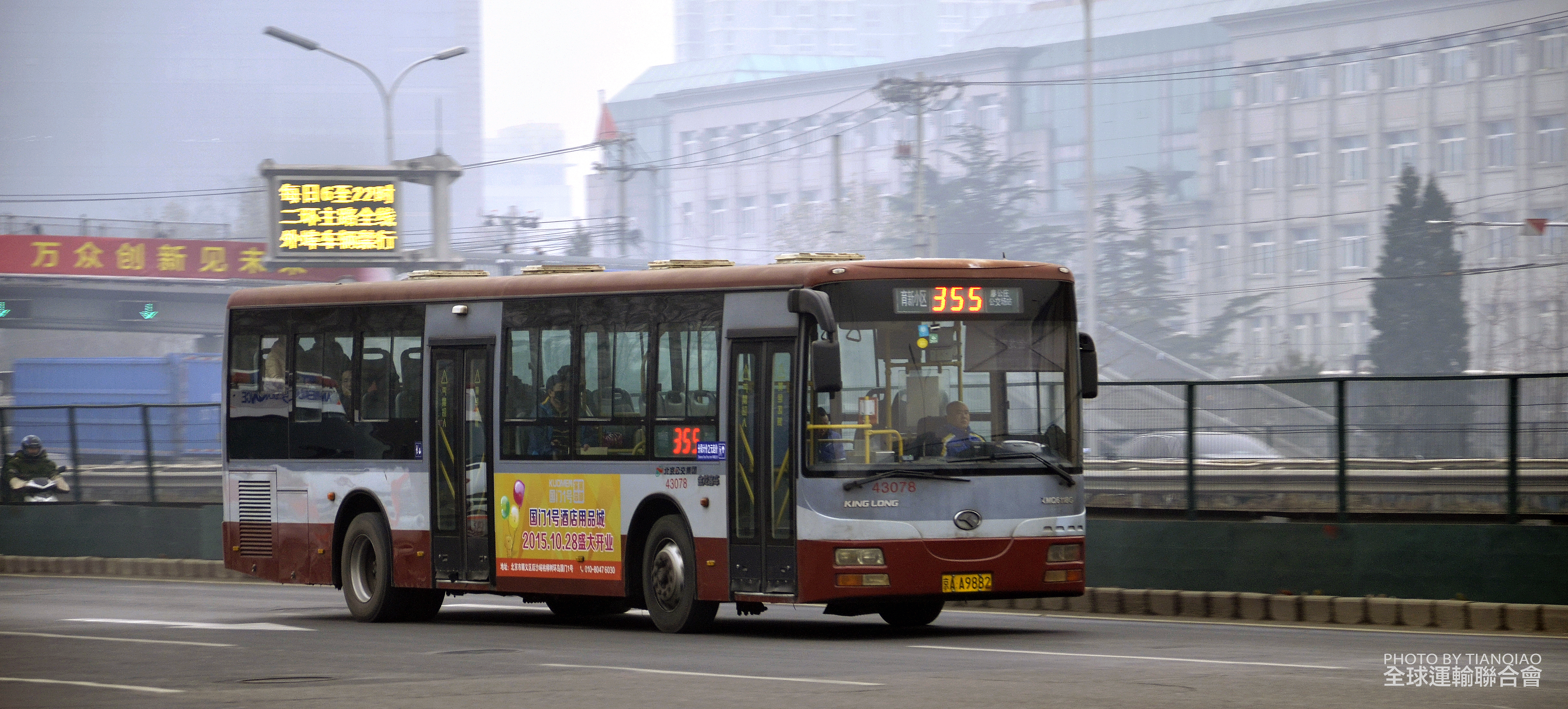
355 running on west 4th Ring Road

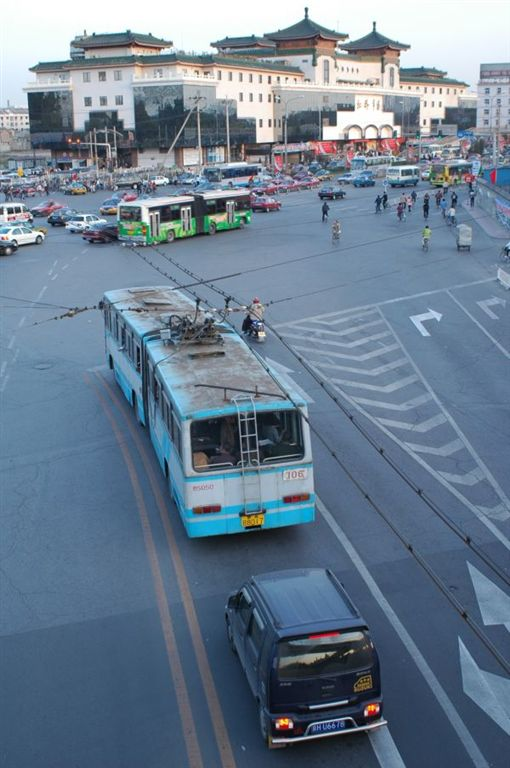
From 1956 to 1966, tram tracks were pulled from city streets and trolleybuses took over tram routes.

The first domestic made buses entered service in 1956. They were trucks made in Changchun with wooden carriages added by the Beijing Passenger Vehicle Factory. Later, the BK640 bus used metal carriages modeled upon Skoda buses. Domestic buses gradually replaced imports.

By 1956, there were 27 bus and tram bus routes, totaling 357 km (222 mi) in length which delivered 235 million trips. In 1958, the first long-distance bus company was established in the city with 114 vehicles, 54 routes and 9.69 million rides delivered. From 1956 to 1966, trolleybuses gradually replaced trams in the city and the number of bus lines grew from 27 to 56 and the length routes reached 157 km (98 mi). During the Great Leap Forward, due to diesel shortages caused by the cut-off of Soviet oil exports to China, 130 Beijing buses were converted to burn natural gas in 1960. The buses, which carried fuel in an inflated bag on the roof, were converted back to burning diesel in 1964, after the discovery of oil in Daqing eased the energy shortage.

In the 1960s to 1970s, trolleybus buses were among the most important means of surface public transportation in the city and their routes expanded beyond the old city to the inner suburbs. Trolleybus expansion ceased in the 1980s with the growth in use of buses with internal combustion engines.

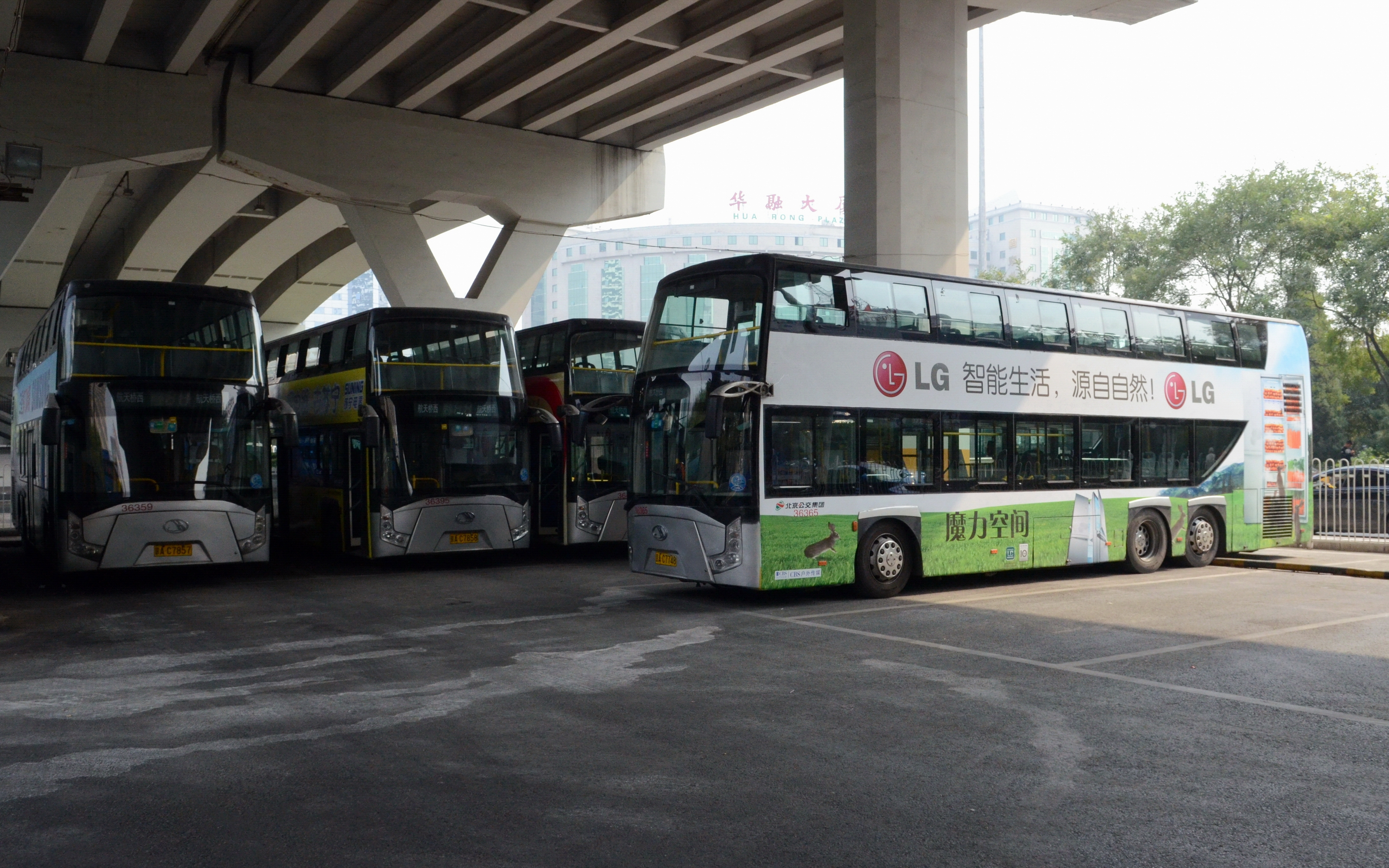
Double-Decker 特8 buses, now route 368, (model Jinghua BK6126S) at Hangtianqiao West in 2011

In the 1980s to the mid-1990s, the capacity of bus service in Beijing grew slowly. From 1984 to the end of 1995, the number of bus routes grew from 101 to 246, the number of vehicles increased by 558 or 16.6% to 3,927, and the number of rides rose by 1.06 billion to 3.11 billion, an increase of 293%. Trolleybus service remained an important backbone of surface public transit in the city with more than a dozen lines and a fleet maintained at around 600 vehicles. In 1990, the first double-decker special bus line entered service, which increased to five lines by 1995.

During the Tiananmen Square protests in the spring of 1989, residents and students used buses and trolleybuses to block the advance of the army into the city and many vehicles were destroyed during the armed crackdown. In March 1997, two bombs detonated on Beijing buses. The first bomb hit a Route 22 Bus in Xidan on the night of March 7, killing three and injuring ten. The second bomb, one day later, claimed two more lives. The bombings, which followed the outbreak of protests and bombings in Xinjiang, took place during the annual session of the National People's Congress and the People's Consultative Conference in Beijing, and were widely blamed on Uyghur separatists.

In July 1997, Beijing inaugurated air-conditioned bus service with the launch of Route 808 (later Route 608 which has since been canceled) from the Summer Palace to Qianmen.

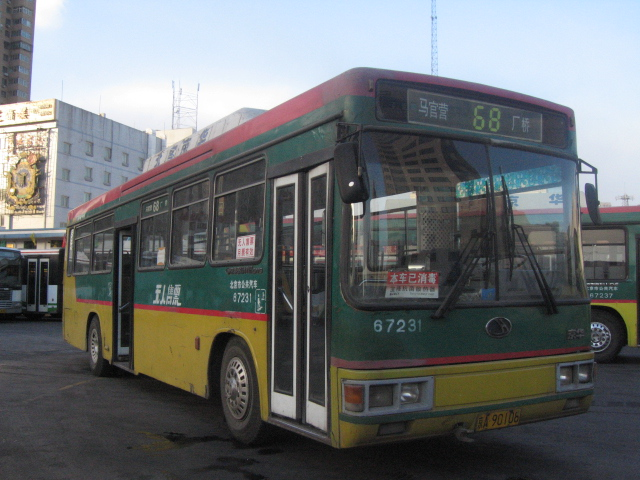
The first compressed natural gas bus in Beijing Bus fleet (model Jinghua BK6111BCNG)

In 1999, the first compressed natural gas buses were introduced to the bus fleet. By the end of 2000, the city had 5,923 natural gas powered buses in operation, the most in the world. Also in the 1999, the 24-hour bus information hotline 96166 was introduced to help riders plan bus trips.

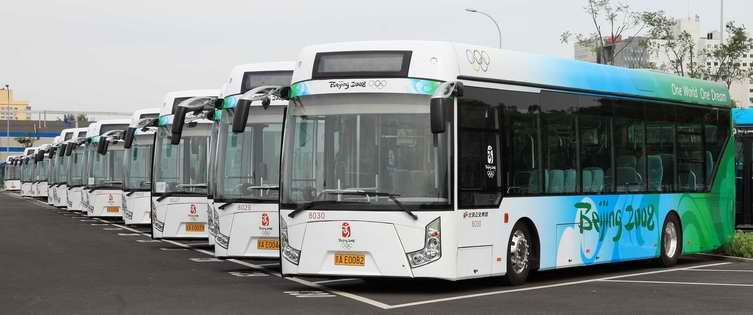
The electric bus fleet in service during the 2008 Olympics.

During the 2001 Summer University Games held in Beijing, the Beijing Bus Transit service provided free shuttle service, delivering 731,777 trips. The first electric buses entered service in September 2003.

In 2005, the first bus rapid transit (BRT) line entered operation. In 2006, the city adopted a new bus fare scheme, fixing the flat-fare rate to ¥1.00 and giving 60% discount to Yikatong riders and 80% discount to student card holders. Also in 2006, the first hydrogen powered bus entered service. In 2007, after the introduction of the reduced fare scheme, the number of rides increased by 20% to 4.097 billion.

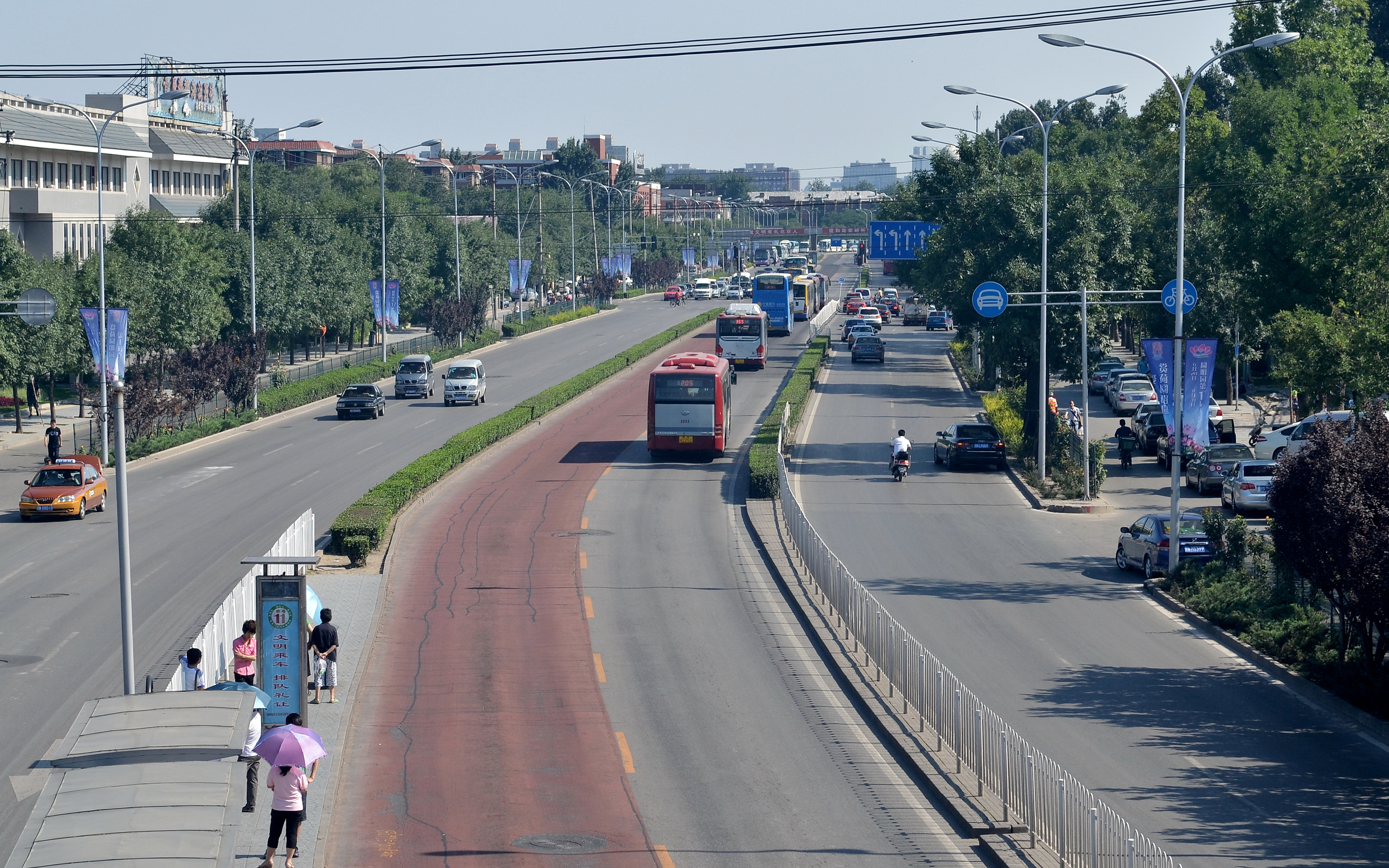
Bus designated lane on Yuanmingyuan East Road in 2012

The city's first designated bus lanes were introduced in 2007 to increase bus travel speed during rush hours. Buses are also exempt from the city's road rationing schemes, which was introduced in 2008, and restricts vehicle access to the city's roadways based on license plate number. On 31 July 2008, three more BRT lines entered operation.

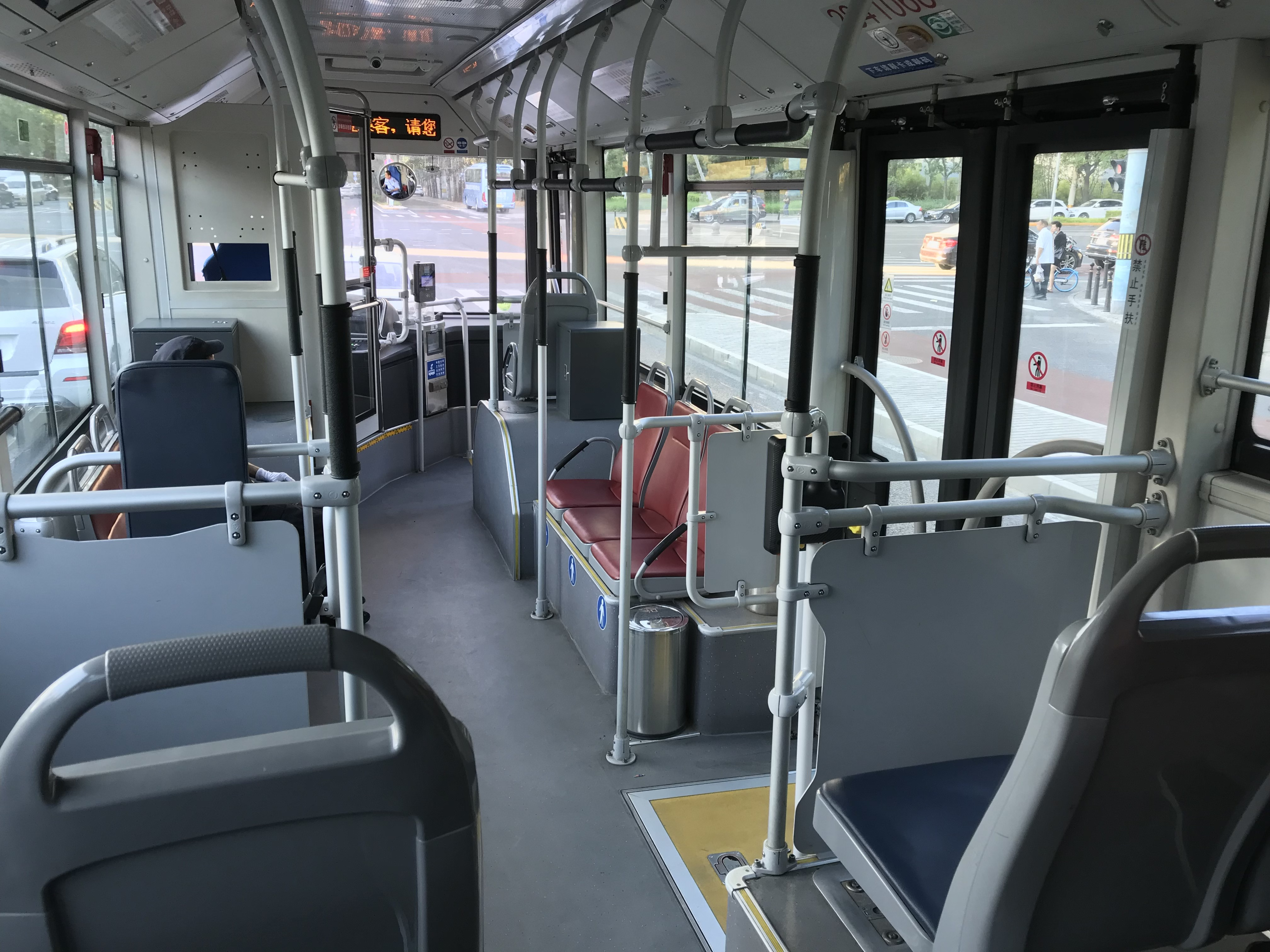
Typical bus interior in urban routes, the type of seat was first introduced in Benz Citaro hydrogen fuel cell buses (below)

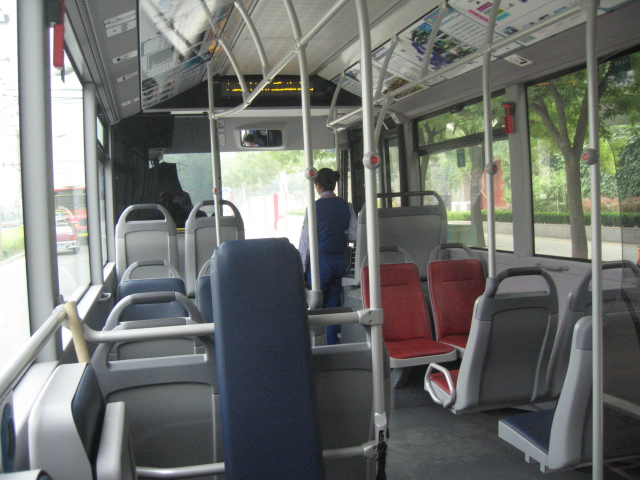

Free Wi-Fi service on city buses was initiated in 2013. Since 2013, In an effort to reduce urban air pollution, Beijing has been converting regular bus and BRT routes to trolleybus routes by installing overhead power lines on several corridors.

Since 2013, the city has converting bus routes with diesel-engine buses to trolleybus routes by installing overhead power lines along thoroughfares in parts of the city to reduce air pollution. At the time the trolley bus system consists of 15 lines and was operated with a fleet of 588 trolleybuses. 500 new trolleybuses were ordered in anticipation for the expansion. In December 2013, Bus 104快 was converted into trolleybus 127, which became the first new trolleybus route since the creation of No. 124 in 2001. On December 28, 2014, bus fare on all routes was changed to a distance-based fare schedule, which raised the starting fare to ¥2.00 per trip for the first 10 km with ¥1.00 added for each subsequent 5 km. The Yikatong discount was reduced from 60% to 50%.

As of June 2015, the trolleybus network grown to 18 lines using a fleet of 928 dual-mode trolleybuses. By July 2015, Bus No. 6, 38, 42, 116, 301, BRT1, and BRT3 had been converted into trolleybus routes.

On July 1, 2016, the first double-decker electric buses entered service in Beijing on Route 观光3, a tourist route that runs from the Summer Palace to the north gate of the Forbidden City. In February 2017, the first double-decker electric buses for a standard route were introduced to Bus 44. The electric double-decker bus has 70 seats and can carry 100 passengers. By March 2017, the electric double decker fleet had expanded to 10 bus routes: 13, 44, 55, 121, 425, 510, 569, 专6, 专8 and 特12. Later that same year, route 10 also started running Yinlong double-decker EVs. In January 2018, Huairou bus H64 was converted to double-decker electric buses.

In March 2017, Bus BRT2 started running trolleybuses. There are further proposals to convert routes 3, 6, 13, 19, 22, 23, 56, 65, 70, 88, 110, 113, 117, 121, 635, 685, 717 and 特5 into trolleybuses, however routes 717 and 特5 have since been canceled. By 2018, the trolleybus fleet has grown to over 1,100 vehicles running on 27 lines.

In 2018, two more routes, line 65 and 128, were converted to electric trolley buses bringing the trolleybus network to 29 lines.

On 1 January 2020, the 32 routes of the Beijing Xianglong Bus Co., Ltd. were renumbered from their former "Yuntong" (运通) numbering scheme to standard BPT numbers as the Xianglong Bus Company was merged into the Beijing Public Transport Holdings, Ltd.^{[e]}

By 2020, the trolleybus network was expanded to 31 routes operated with a fleet of over 1,250 vehicles.

== Security ==
To enhance security on buses, over 1,000 uniformed security guards were assigned to some 16 bus routes on an experimental basis in late 2013. As of June 2014, the practice is being continued with security personnel riding on 15 routes including 57, 特11 and 特12. About 4,000 buses are being outfitted with surveillance cameras.

== Future concepts ==
=== Hydrogen fuel-cell bus ===
Hydrogen-powered fuel-cell buses began operating in Beijing on an experimental basis in 2006. Three fuel cell buses, made by Daimler in Germany and purchased with a grant from the U.N. Development Programme, plied an 18.2-km route from the North Gate of the Summer Palace to Wudaokou. They were the first fuel cell buses to enter operation in China. As of 2013, the technology had not gained broader use in the city because air pollution reduced the efficiency and operating life of fuel cells.

== Cultural ==
The Beijing Public Transport Museum at 91 Fahua Temple Road in Dongcheng District, just east of the Temple of Heaven, has a collection of vintage bus, trolleybus and trams used in Beijing.

The Beijing Public Transport Holdings, Ltd. funded a football club called the Beijing Bus FC, which competed in China League Two and played home games at the Chaolai Football Centre. The team disbanded after the 2006 season.

== See also ==
- Beijing Airport Bus
- Trams in Beijing
- Beijing Subway

== Notes ==
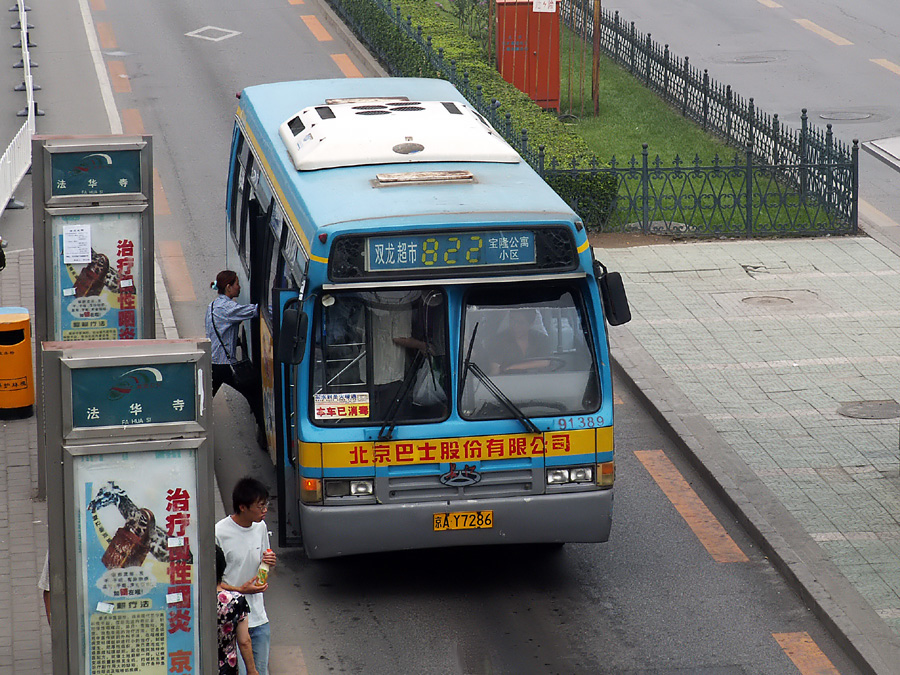
A Route 822 bus at the Fahua Temple stop in 2006, which was modified as a rapid line numbered 687 in 2007, and then cancelled at the end of 2014. ^{[c]}

a. In November 2011, bus routes numbered in the 800s were re-numbered to make way for a reorganization of the 800 route buses into long-distance buses, and the preexisting 8xx bus routes were renamed as follows: 800内外→特12内外; 801→601; 802→99; 808→608; 810→609; 814→614; 823→623; 826→626; 836→617; 846→619; 849→620; and 852→621.

b. On March 26, 2014, the following regular city bus routes were re-numbered as neighborhood shuttles with the 专 prefix: 427→专101, 429→专102, 442→专103, 444→专104, 491→专105, 492→专106, 517→专107, 58→专108, 311→专109, 564→专110, 440→专111, 446→专112, 495→专113, 424→专114, 566→专115, 572→专116, 417→专117, 522→专118, 533→专119, 540→专120, 548→专121, 590→专122.

c. On May 10, 2014, seven double-decker bus routes were renumbered with the 特 prefix such that all double-decker routes were uniformly named with the 特 prefix: 83→特13, 54→特14, 85→特15, 406→特16, 72→特17, 320→特18, 319→特19. In addition, Bus 623 was renamed Bus 3.

d. In August 2014, Beijing renumbered Buses 201-215 to a number scheme with the 夜 prefix. Also, many of the routes were redrawn such that very few of the old routes were carried through to the new scheme.

e. On 1 January 2020, all the former "Yuntong" (运通) routes were renumbered as follows: 运通101→921, 运通102→62, 运通103→603, 运通104→604, 运通105→305, 运通106→686, 运通107→687, 运通108→608, 运通109→609, 运通110→450, 运通111→451, 运通112→932, 运通113→613, 运通114→644, 运通115→685, 运通116→876, 运通117→617, 运通118→688, 运通119→专139, 运通120→420, 运通121→专141, 运通122→专142, 运通123→623, 运通124→424, 运通125→专145, 运通126→626, 运通127→专147, 运通128→628, 运通129→专149, 运通201→491, 运通202→492, 运通205→495.

f. During February 2020, the remaining 特 ("special") and 700-series routes were renumbered as follows: 特2→142, 特7→137, 特8→368, 特9→400快, 特11→141, 特12→200, 特13→143, 特14→144, 特15→145, 特16→406, 特19→129, 701→4, 740→400, 751→319.
