= Trams in Beijing =

Public transport system in Beijing, China

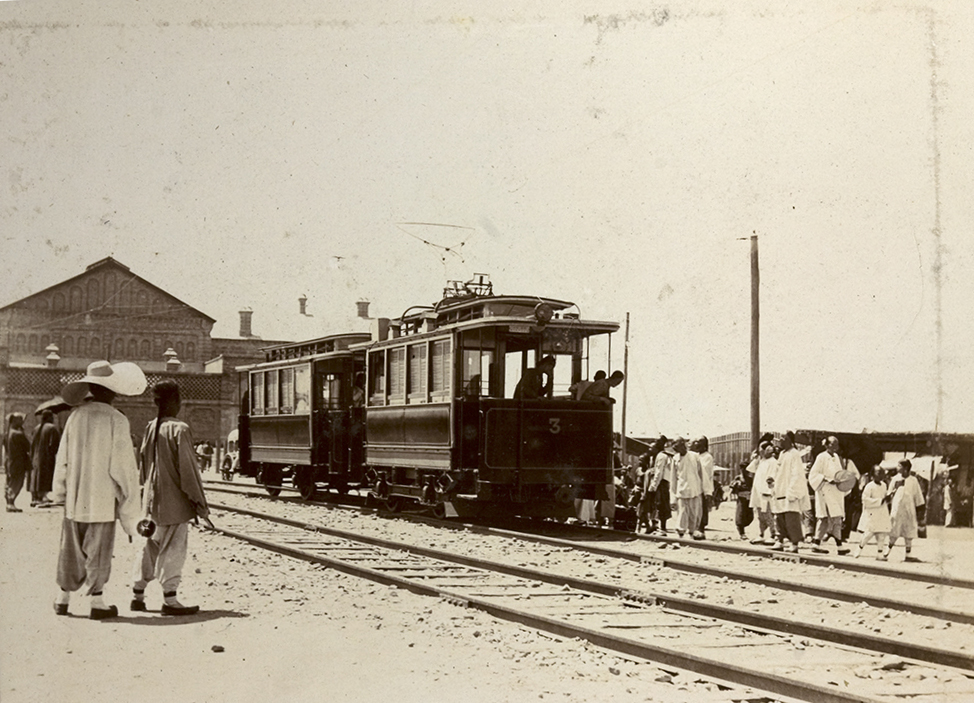
Tram at Majiapu station in 1900

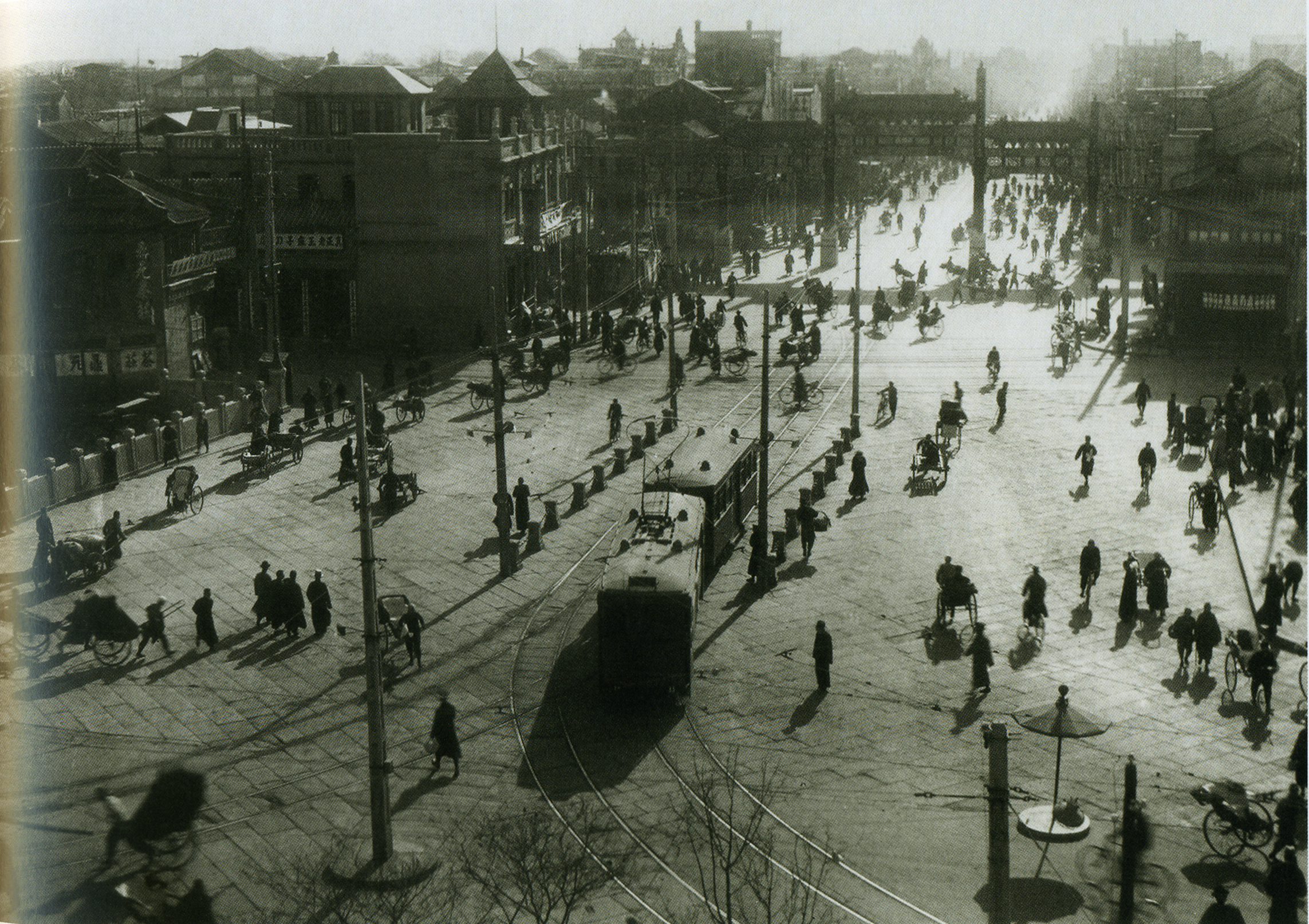
Tram on Qianmen Avenue in the 1930s

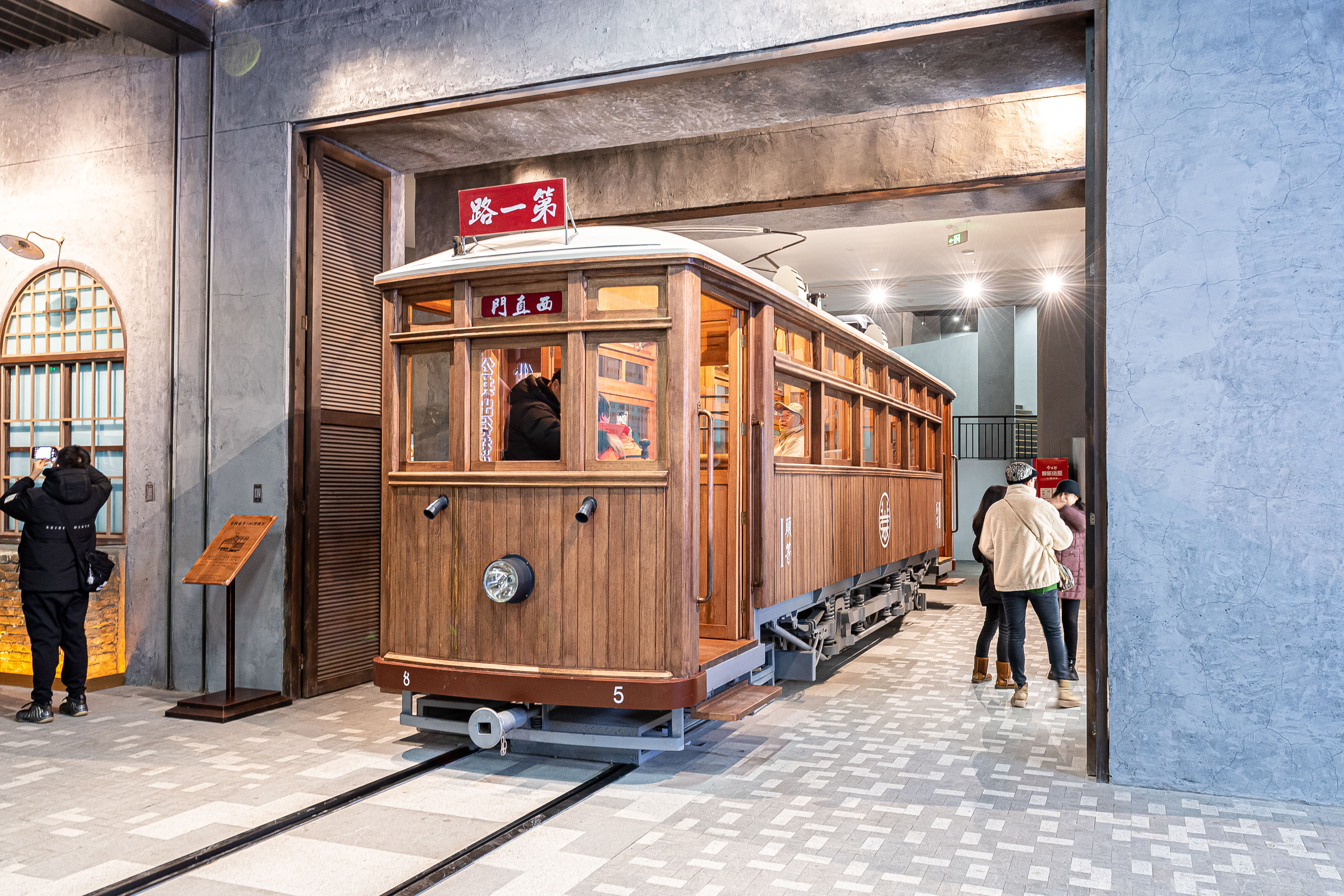
Replica of old Beijing tram

The earliest tram (Chinese: 有轨电车) service in Beijing dates back to 1899, and trams were the main form of public transit from 1924 to the late 1950s before they were replaced by trolleybuses that follow the tram routes they replaced. However new tram services are being introduced in Beijing's suburbs.

== History of old trams ==
The oldest municipal tram service in Beijing dates to 1899 when foreign interests built and operated a 7.5-km tram service between Majiapu and Yongdingmen. The track was destroyed during the Boxer Rebellion in 1900.

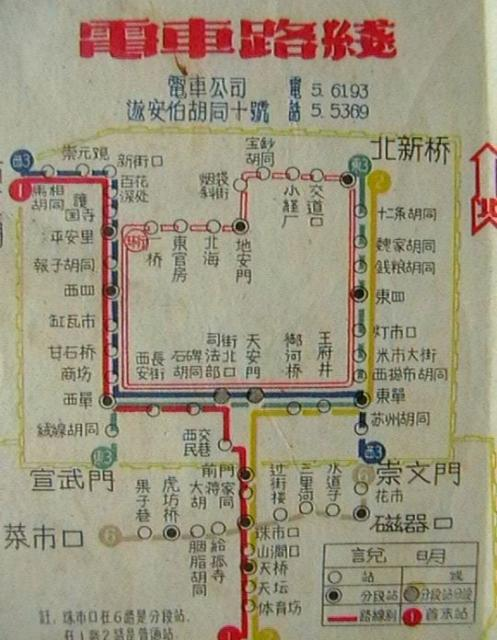
1950s tram map of Beijing

In June 1921, the city government established the Peking Electric Tramway Co., Ltd. and used company shares to secure a 2 million dollar loan from the Franco-Chinese Bank to fund the enterprise. Virtually all equipment were imported – the tram tracks from France, street car from Japan, power generation equipment from Sweden and Germany, and repair facilities from Britain. Tram service commenced three years later on December 17, 1924. Several hundred guests, foreigners among them, attended the inauguration at the southern end of Tiananmen Square. A dozen street cars paraded along the 9-km initial tram route from Qianmen to Xizhimen. City residents crowded along route to see the new vehicles. Five years later, the number of routes grew to five, which were distinguished by the colors red, yellow, blue, white and green. The street cars were for the most part well received by city residents, except rickshaw drivers whose business diminished considerably. On October 22, 1929, the rickshaw driver's union clashed with the Trolley Company and rickshaw drivers swarmed into the Tram depot, and destroyed 63 trams, halting service for 18 days.

In July 1930, the 6th Route, began service from Chongwenmen to East Zhushikou. The outbreak of the Second Sino-Japanese War following the Marco Polo Bridge Incident ceased tram service temporarily. On January 1, 1938, the 6th Route Branch Line began operating on the newly built tracks between Tianqiao and Yongdingmen. Ridership averaged 129,000 per day in June 1942. By 1943, the city had seven tram routes with a combined length of 46.65 km and 144 trams in operation.

During the Chinese Civil War, tram service diminished. Ridership had fallen to 60,000 to 70,000 per day. In March 1950, the tramline's ring route from Pinganli through Xisi, Xidan, Tiananmen, Dongdan and Dongsi was restored. An eighth route from Hongqiao to Tianqiao was added in 1955. By 1957, the tram service had 250 trams in operation, reaching an all-time high. Yet, trams by then were considered slow and noisy compared to other motor vehicles and was more expensive and cumbersome to expand service into newly developed areas of the city because they required the laying of track. City planners looked to trolleybuses, which do not need tracks and do not require diesel fuel to operate. In the 1950s, Chinese petroleum production was limited and trolleybuses like trams could be powered from electricity generated sources other than oil.

On October 17, 1956, Beijing's first trolleybus made a successful trial run from Xisi to Fuchengmen. On February 26, 1957, the city's first trolleybus began commercial operation from Beichizi and Fuchengmen. On August 22, 1958, the Beijing People's Congress voted to replace tram service inside the old city with trolleybuses and regular buses by October 1959, in time for the 10th anniversary celebrations of the founding of the People's Republic of China. On March 9, 1959, workers removed tram tracks and power lines between Xizhimen and Xidan and installed trolleybus lines. The next day, Trolleybus Line No. 5 began operation from Qianmen to Xidan, Xinjiekou and Xizhimen. Tram service from Qianmen to Dongdan, Beixinqiao and Dongzhimen was replaced by Bus No. 24. Tram service was rapidly phased out of the old city. On May 6, 1966, the last car on the tram line between Yongdingmen and Beijing Gymnasium ceased operations, ending tram service in the city until the Qianmen Avenue Street Car began running 42 years later.

== In operation ==
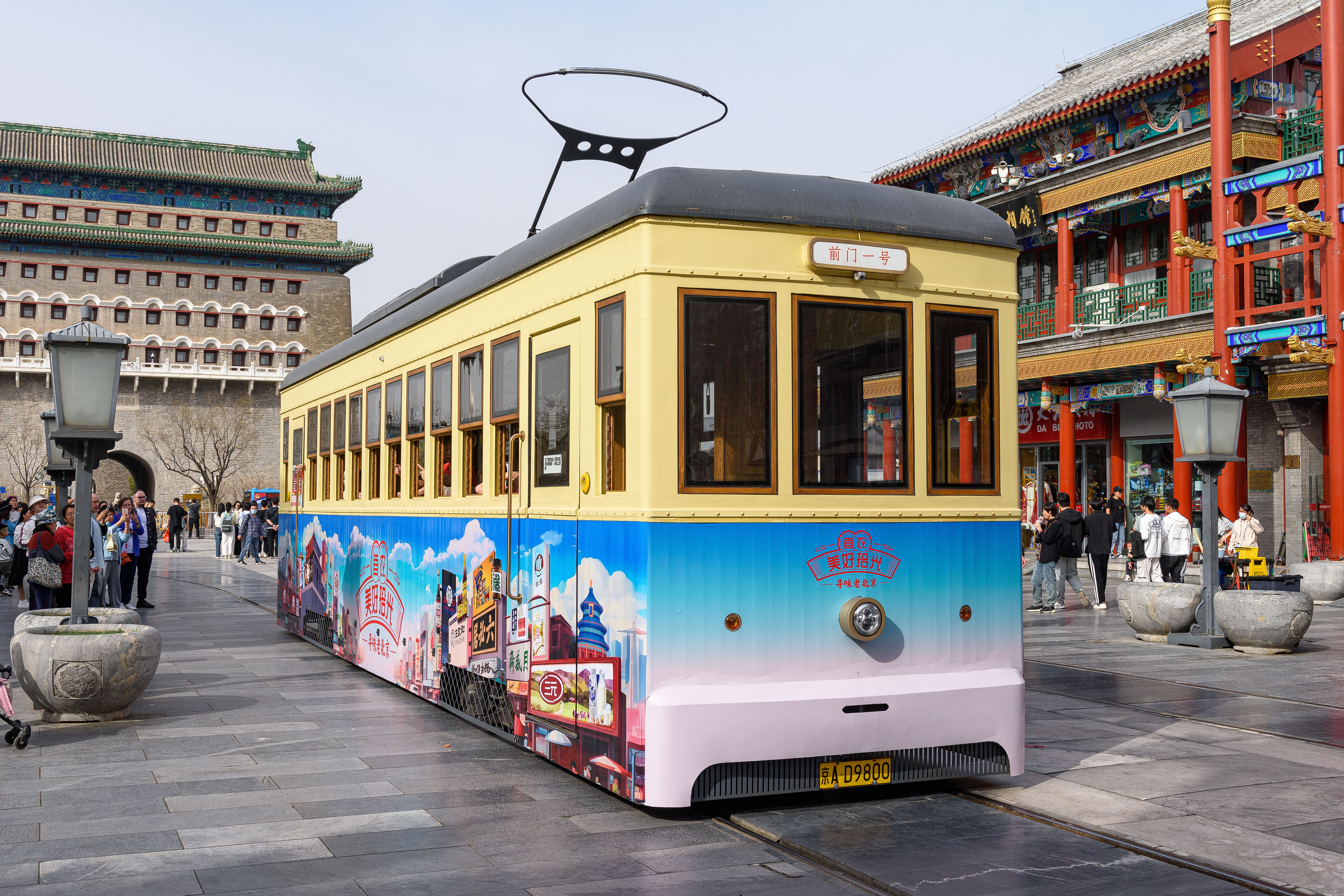
The Qianmen tourist tram

=== Qianmen tourist tram ===
In 2008, tram service returned to Beijing with the introduction of a tourist tram on Qianmen Avenue. There are two battery-powered retro-styled trams running on two separate tracks. Usually, only one tram runs.

=== Xijiao line of Beijing Subway ===
In December 2017, the first true public transit tram line, Xijiao line was opened.

=== Line T1 of Beijing Yizhuang Tram ===
Yizhuang New Town Modern Tram (亦庄新城现代有轨电车) is a tram system in Beijing Economic-Technological Development Area (Yizhuang Development Area).

Line T1 opened on 31 December 2020.

== Planned ==
=== Yizhuang New Town Modern Tram ===
A further three lines, Lines T2, T3 and T4 are under planning.

=== Shunyi Modern Tram ===
Shunyi Modern Tram is a tram system in Shunyi District.

Line T2 is a 19.84 km, 22 station tram line. The line has been put on hold as of 2019.

A further two lines, Lines T1 and T3 are under planning.

=== Fengtai Hexi Modern Tram ===
A tram network in Fengtai District consisting of two lines, Lines T1 and T2, is currently under planning.

== See also ==
- Beijing Bus
- Beijing Subway
