= Yikatong =

Smart card used in Beijing, China

Beijing Municipal Administration & Communication Card 北京市政交通一卡通
- Location: Beijing, China
- Launched: 2003
- Technology: MIFARE
- Currency: CNY¥
- Validity: Beijing Subway; Beijing Buses; Beijing Taxis; Line S2 (BCR); Cooperating retailers and restaurants
- Website: www.bmac.com.cn/

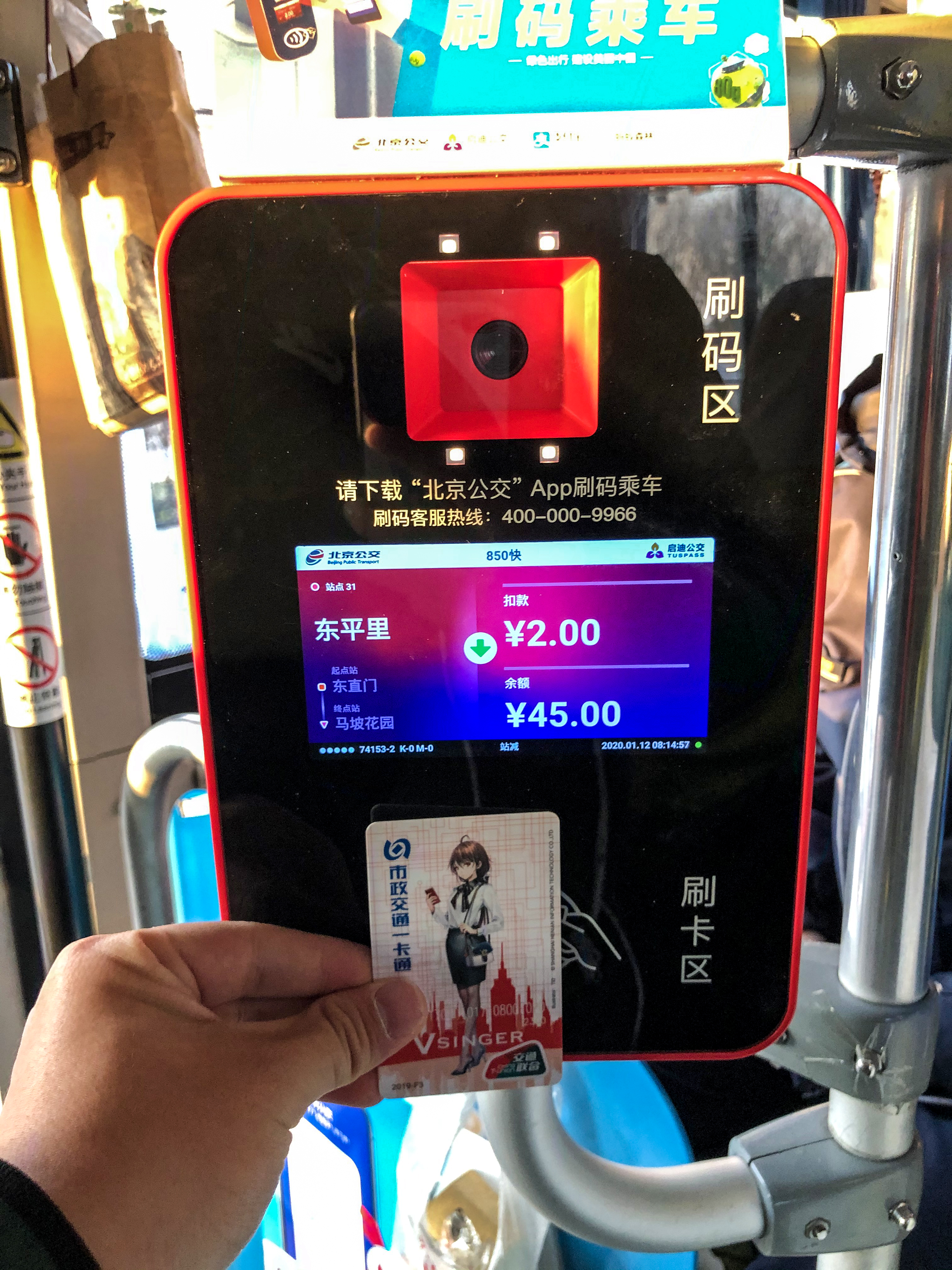
Example of tapping out of a bus with Yikatong

The Beijing Municipal Administration & Communication Card (Chinese: 北京市政交通一卡通; pinyin: Běijīng Shìzhèng jiāotōng Yīkǎtōng), more commonly known as the Yikatong (literally One-card pass), is a stored-value contactless smart card used in Beijing, China, for public transportation and related uses. It is similar to the Octopus card in Hong Kong, CEPAS in Singapore, the OMNY card in New York City, or the Oyster card in London.

== History ==
After smart card pilot projects proved successful, Yikatong was introduced at the end of 2003 on Beijing subway Line 13 and certain bus routes. Initially, the card was not widely adopted by passengers because of its limited usefulness, the relatively high deposit, and its lack of availability. Beginning on 10 May 2006, Beijing's entire subway system and all Beijing buses began to accept the card, which replaced the traditional paper monthly passes. At the same time, the purchase and recharging of cards became possible at many more commercial outlets. While some passengers initially complained about long queues at bus stops, the system was adopted by increasing numbers of people. On 16 May 2006, 4,471,800 transactions were made using Yikatong.

The system was introduced on some taxis in 2006 and, from the beginning of August 2008, all Beijing taxis were required to accept Yikatong for fare payment. The system was expected to be further expanded for payments of parking fees and expressway tolls.

By the end of 2011, 41.76 million Yikatong cards had been issued.

Beginning in 2022, the Yikatong card was mandated to be tied to an individual's Beijing Health Kit as a way to further enforce China's Zero-COVID efforts and its associated regular testing. This policy has remained despite the end of Zero-COVID, meaning foreigners without a Chinese National ID or Permanent Resident ID plus a mainland Chinese mobile phone number (i.e. visitor with only a passport) are unable to purchase and top up a Yikatong from an automated kiosk, and must transact at a staffed cashier booth.

== Cost ==
The card can be purchased with a deposit of CNY 20, and can be bought at most ticket counters at Beijing Subway stations and some bus stations. The deposit is used to cover insufficient funds for a single trip, and can be refunded when the card is returned. The card may be topped up in multiples of CNY 10 up to a maximum of CNY 1000. A Yikatong retains its value for up to three years after its last activity.

When paying by the Yikatong card, passengers get 50% off the normal bus fare within the municipality, except on some special purpose routes with a flat fare. Yikatong offers no discount on subway or taxi fares. Unlimited metro (excluding the Capital and Daxing Airport Express lines) and bus ride passes are available for 1, 2, 3, 5, and 7-day validities.
