= Beijing Bus F.C. =

Chinese football club

Beijing Bus 北京巴士
- Full name: Beijing Bus FC 北京巴士足球俱乐部
- Founded: 2004
- Dissolved: 2006
- Ground: Chaolai Football Centre, Beijing, China
- Capacity: 5,000
- Chairman: Jiesen Wang
- Manager: Yuanshuo Hong
Home colours	Away colours

Beijing Bus FC (Simplified Chinese: 北京巴士足球俱乐部) was a football club based in Beijing, China, that most recently participated in China League Two. The club was formed by Beijing Bus Co., Ltd., and its president was Wang Jiesen. They mainly played at Beijing Chaolai Sports Activity Center.
