= Chaolai Football Centre =

Football ground in Beijing, China

Coordinates: 40°00′51″N 116°26′23″E

Chaolai Football Centre (Simplified Chinese: 朝来足球活动中心) is a football ground in Beijing, China. It is currently used mostly for football matches.
