= Beijing =

Capital city of China

Beijing 北京 Peking
- Capital and municipality
- Beijing Municipality
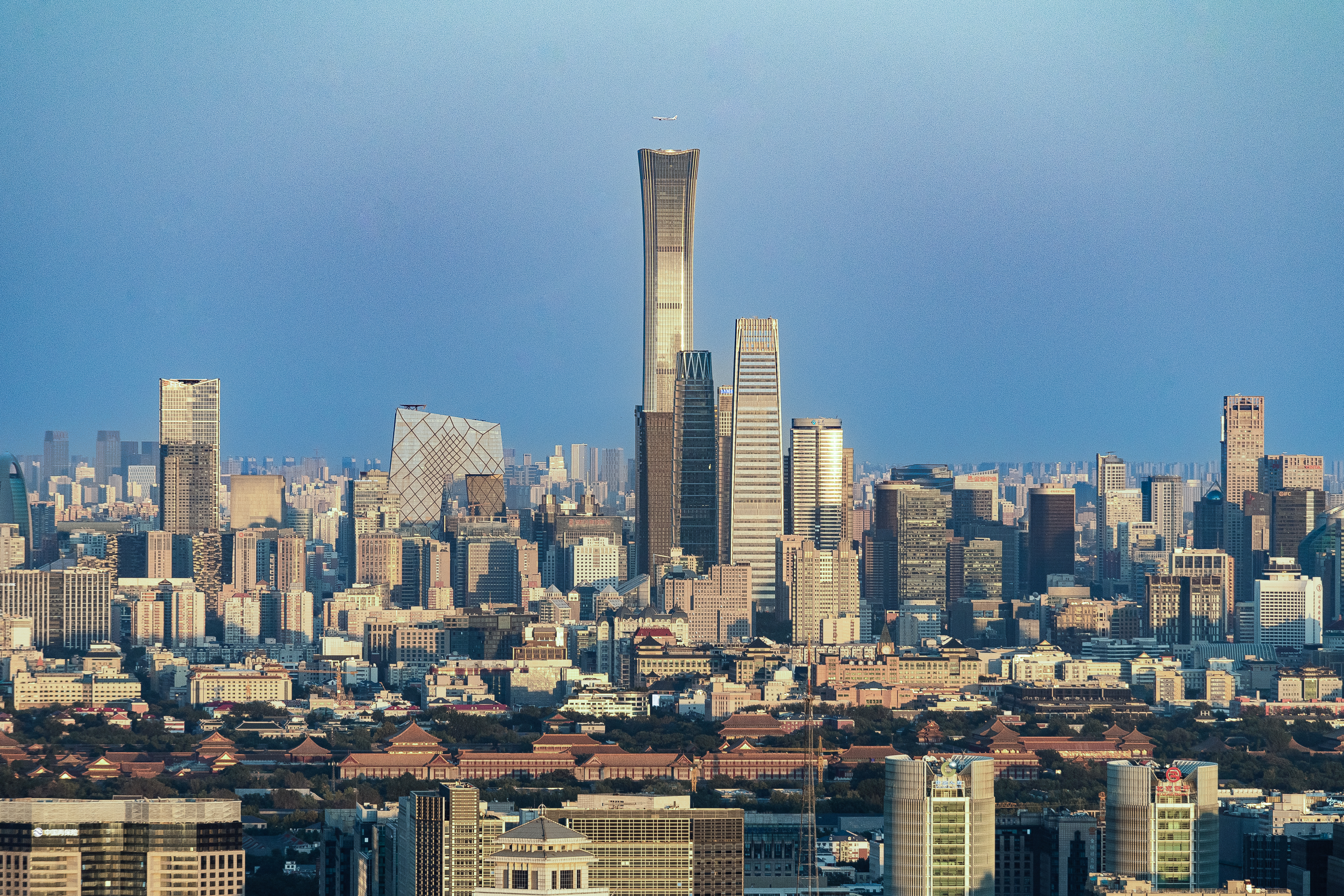
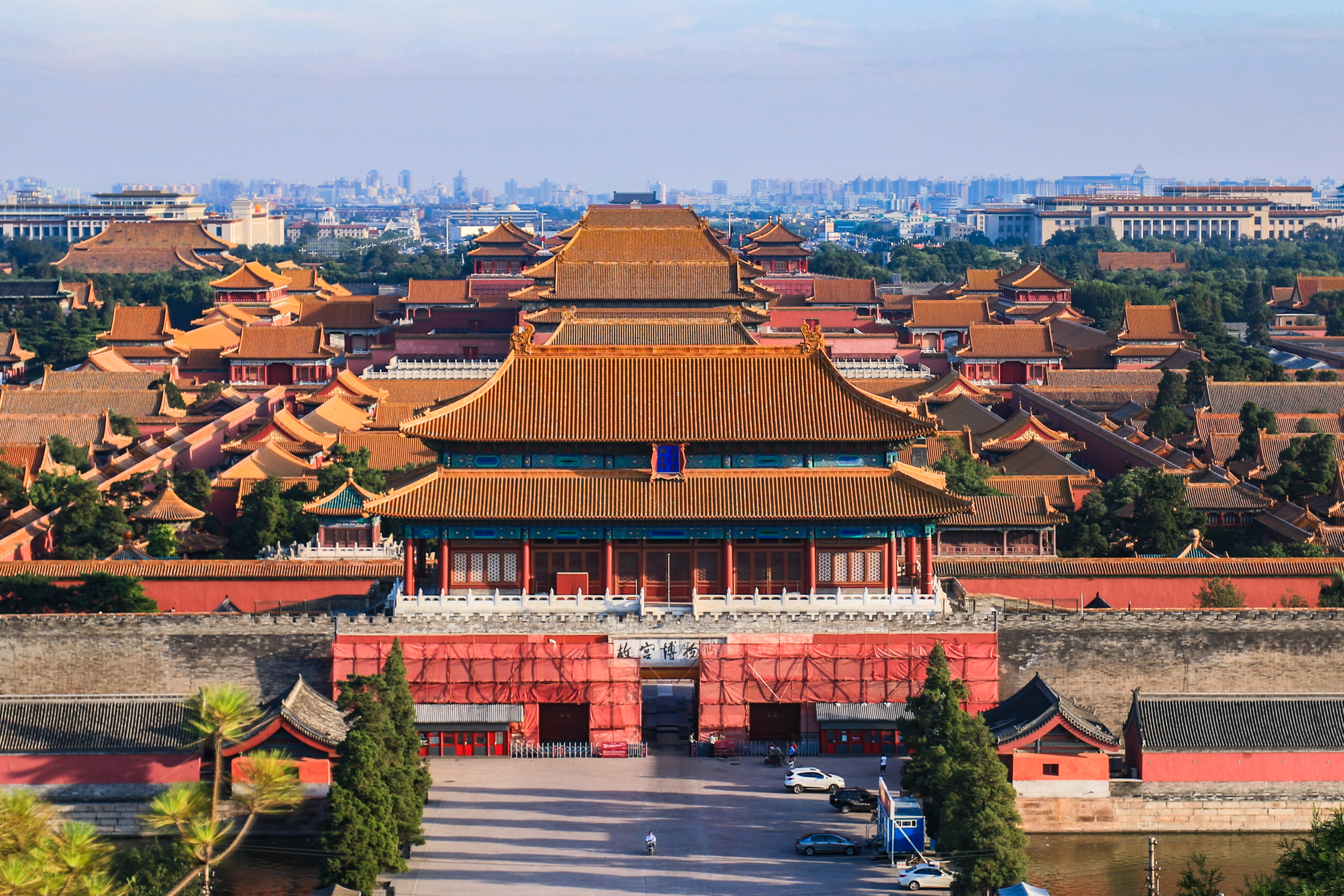
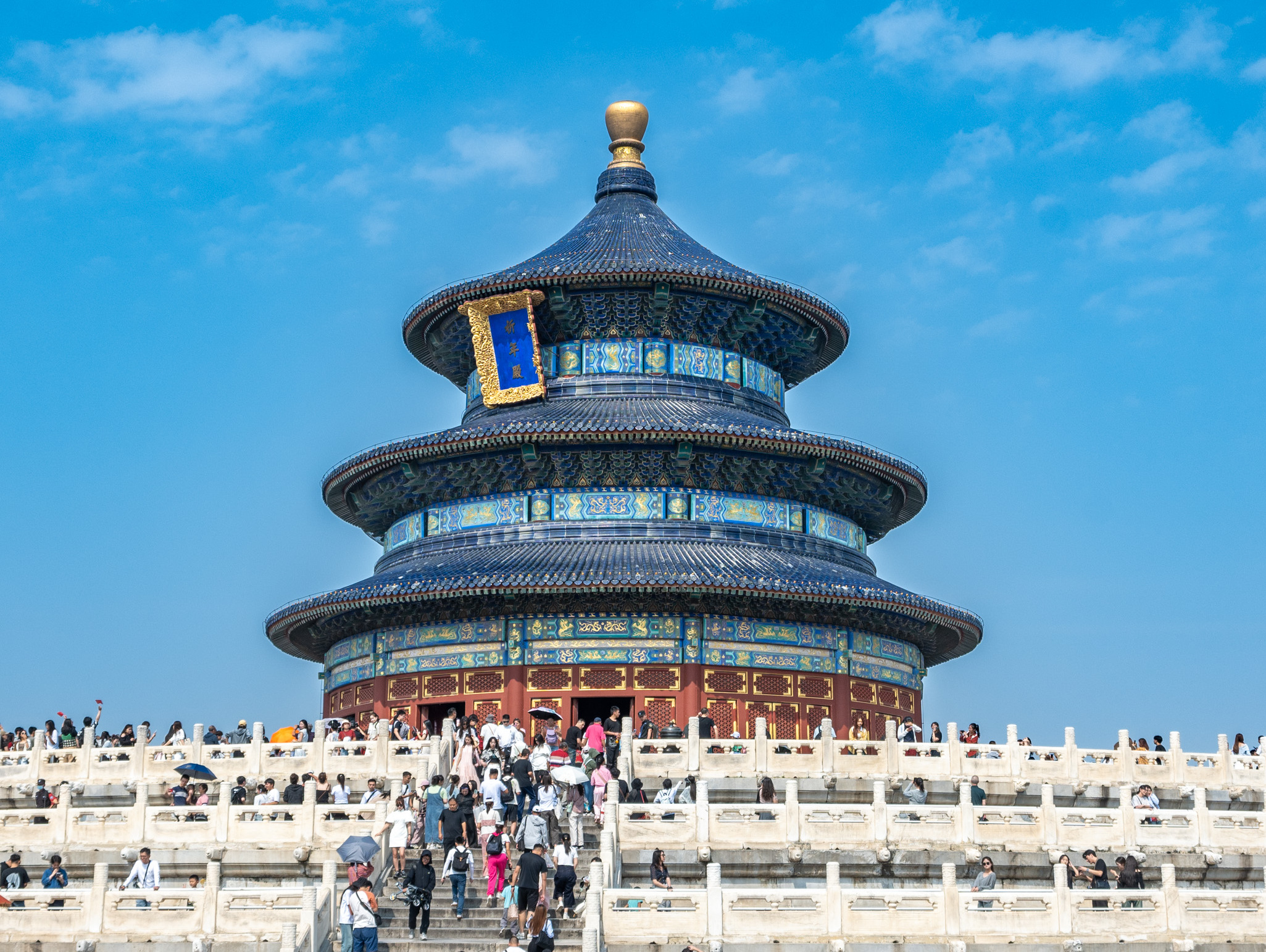
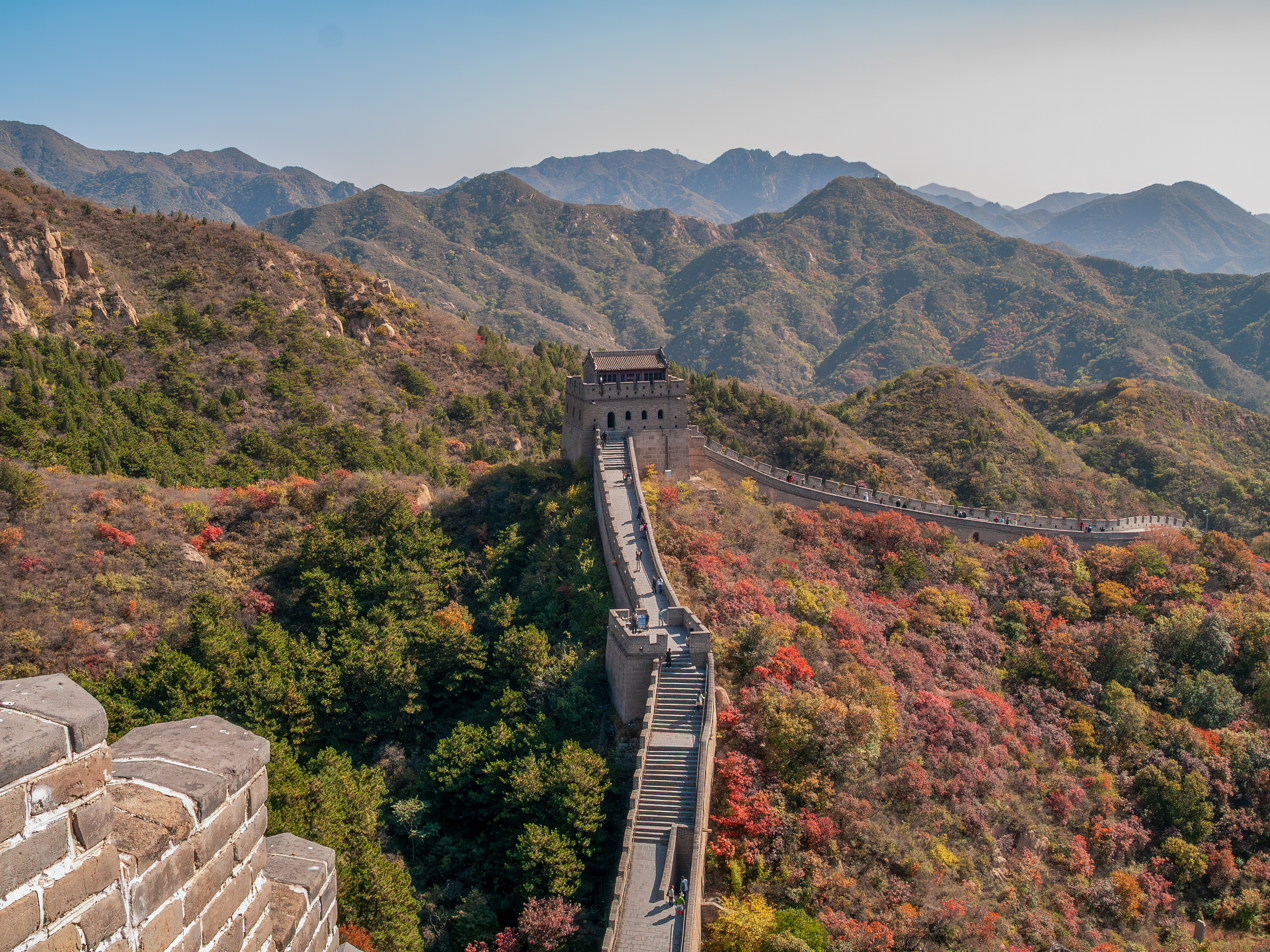
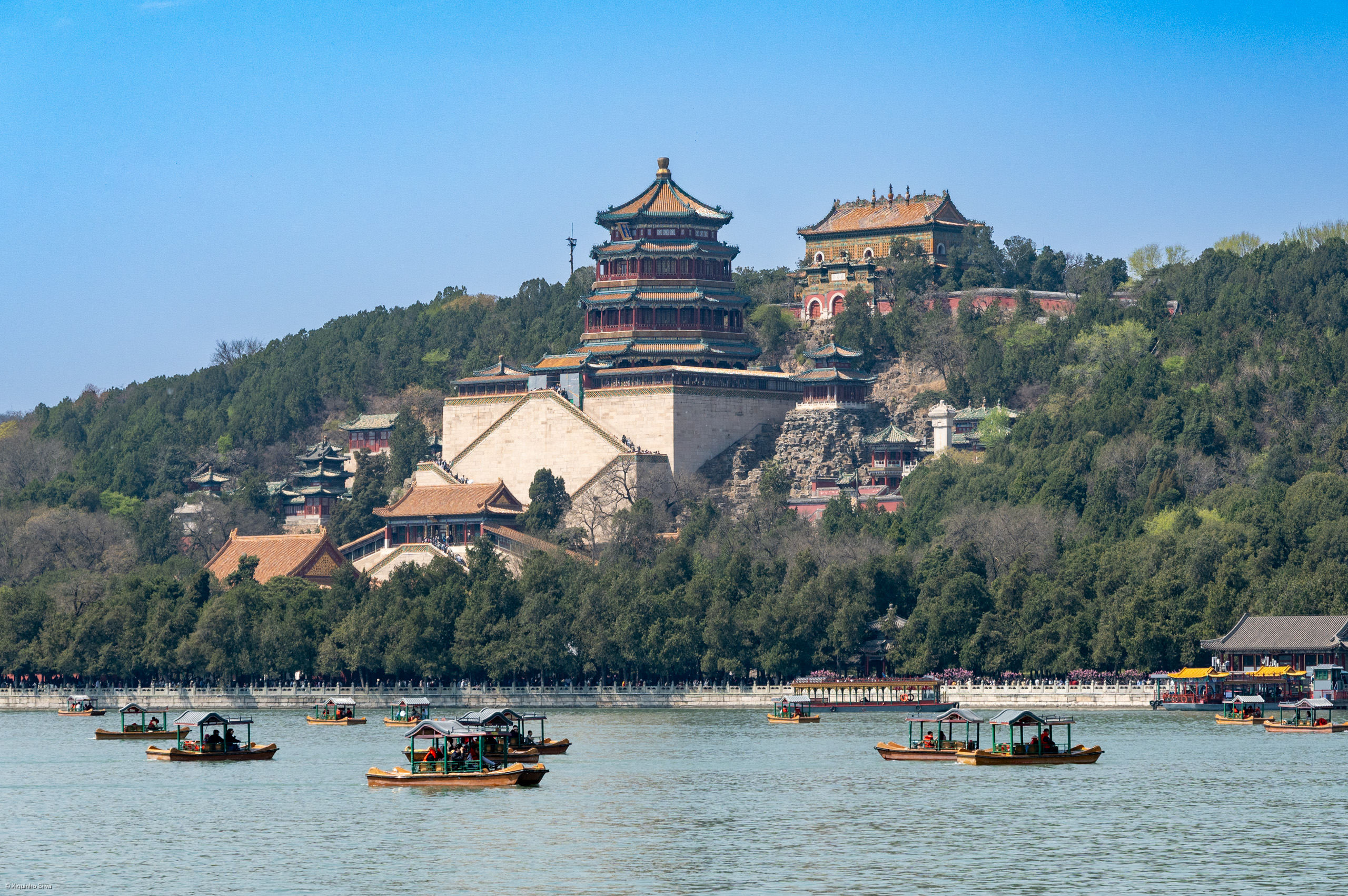
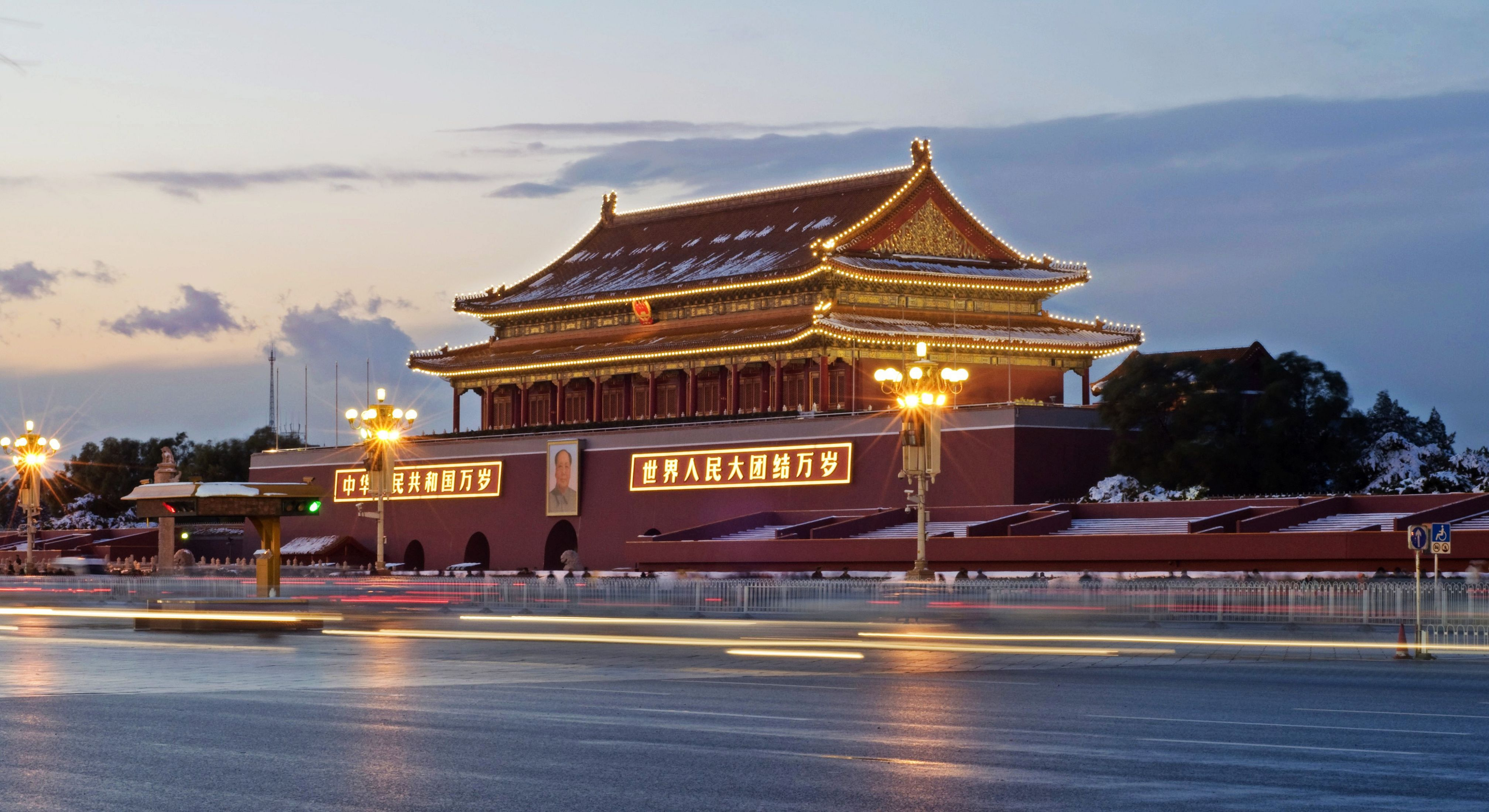
- Beijing central business district with the China Zun (center) Forbidden City Temple of Heaven The Great Wall at Badaling Summer Palace Tian'anmen

- Location of Beijing Municipality within China
- Interactive map of Beijing
- Location within China Location within Asia
- Coordinates (Tian'anmen Square national flag): 39°54′24″N 116°23′51″E
- Country: China
- Established: 1045 BC
- Founder: Zhou dynasty (Western Zhou)
- Municipal seat: Tongzhou District
- Divisions: County-level; Township-; level: 16 districts 343 towns and subdistricts

Government
  - Type: Municipality
  - Body: Beijing Municipal People's Congress
  - Party Secretary: Yin Li
  - Congress Chairman: Li Xiuling
  - Mayor: Yin Yong
  - Municipal CPPCC Chairman: Vacant
  - National People's Congress Representation: 53 deputies

Area
  - Municipality: 16,410.54 km^{2} (6,336.14 sq mi)
  - Metro: 12,796.5 km^{2} (4,940.8 sq mi)
- Elevation: 43.5 m (143 ft)
- Highest elevation (Mount Ling): 2,303 m (7,556 ft)

Population (2020 census)
  - Municipality: 21,893,095
  - Density: 1,334.087/km^{2} (3,455.271/sq mi)
  - Metro: 22,366,547
  - Metro density: 1,747.86/km^{2} (4,526.95/sq mi)
  - Rank: 2nd in China; 2nd in Asia; 27th as an administrative division Density: 4th

Ethnic groups
  - Han: 95%

GDP (2025)
  - Municipality: CN¥ 5,207 billion (13th); US$ 747 billion
  - Per capita: CN¥ 239,000 (1st); US$ 34,314
- Time zone: UTC+08:00 (CST)
- Postal codes: 100000–102629
- Area code: 10
- ISO 3166 code: CN-BJ
- Growth: ▲5.4% (2025)
- License plate prefixes: 京A, C, E, F, G, H, J, K, L, M, N, P, Q 京B (taxis) 京G, Y (outside urban area) 京O, D (police and authorities)
- Climate: Monsoon-influenced hot-summer humid continental climate (Dwa)
- Abbreviation: BJ / 京 (jīng)
- HDI (2023): 0.912 (1st) – very high
- Website: beijing.gov.cn english.beijing.gov.cn
- Symbols
- Flower: China rose (Rosa chinensis); Chrysanthemum (Chrysanthemum morifolium)
- Tree: Chinese arborvitae (Platycladus orientalis); Pagoda tree (Styphnolobium japonicum)

Beijing
- "Beijing" in regular Chinese characters
- Chinese: 北京
- Hanyu Pinyin: Běijīng
- Postal: Peking (Note: Loaned earlier via French "Pékin".); Peiping (1368–1403; 1928–1937; 1945–1949)
- Literal meaning: "Northern Capital"
Transcriptions
Standard Mandarin
- Hanyu Pinyin: Běijīng
- Bopomofo: ㄅㄟˇ ㄐㄧㄥ
- Gwoyeu Romatzyh: Beeijing
- Wade–Giles: Pei^{3}-ching^{1}
- Tongyong Pinyin: Běijing
- Yale Romanization: BěiJīng
- IPA: [pèɪ.tɕíŋ]
Wu
- Suzhounese: Poq^{7}-cin^{1}
Hakka
- Romanization: Bet^{5}-gin^{1}
Yue: Cantonese
- Yale Romanization: Bākgīng
- Jyutping: bak1 ging1
- IPA: [pɐk̚˥ kɪŋ˥]
Southern Min
- Hokkien POJ: Pak-kiaⁿ
- Tâi-lô: Pak-kiann
Eastern Min
- Fuzhou BUC: Báe̤k-gĭng

Beijing, (Note: /beɪˈdʒɪŋ/ bay-JING, Chinese: 北京; pinyin: Běijīng; Mandarin pronunciation: [pèɪ.tɕíŋ]) previously romanized as Peking, (Note: /piːˈkɪŋ/ pee-KING) is the capital city of China. With more than 21.8 million residents, it is the world's most populous national capital city, as well as China's second-largest city by urban area, after Shanghai. It is located in Northern China and is governed as a provincial-level direct-administered municipality with 16 municipal districts. Beijing is mostly surrounded by Hebei Province and neighbors Tianjin Municipality to the southeast; together, the three divisions form the Jing-Jin-Ji cluster.

Beijing is a global city and one of the world's leading centers for culture, diplomacy, politics, finance, business and economics, education, research, language, tourism, media, sports, science and technology, transportation, and art. It is home to the headquarters of most of China's largest state-owned companies and houses the largest number of Fortune Global 500 companies in the world, as well as the world's four biggest financial institutions by total assets. It is also a major hub for the national highway, expressway, railway, and high-speed rail networks. For a decade before the COVID-19 pandemic, Beijing Capital International Airport was Asia's busiest airport (2009–2019) and the second-busiest airport in the world (2010–2019). In 2020, the Beijing subway was the fourth-busiest and second-longest in the world. Beijing Daxing International Airport, Beijing's second international airport, is the largest single-structure airport terminal in the world. The city has hosted numerous international and national sporting events, the most notable being the 2008 Summer Olympics and 2008 Summer Paralympics Games. In 2022, Beijing became the first city to host both the Summer and Winter Olympics, and also the Summer and Winter Paralympics.

The architecture of Beijing contains elements of both traditional Chinese architecture and modern styles, with one half of the city being modernized and renovated, and the other half still offering traditional hutong districts. Beijing is one of the oldest cities in the world, with recorded history spanning over three millennia. As the last remaining one of the Four Great Ancient Capitals of China, Beijing has been the political center of the country for most of the past eight centuries and was the largest city in the world by population for much of the second millennium AD. With mountains surrounding the city on three sides and ancient city fortifications, Beijing's strategic location allowed it to be developed into the residence of the emperor. The city is renowned for its opulent palaces, temples, parks, gardens, tombs, walls and gates. Beijing is considered one of the most well-known tourist destinations in the world. In 2018, Beijing was the second highest earning tourist city in the world after Shanghai. Beijing is home to many national monuments and museums and has eight UNESCO World Heritage Sites—the Forbidden City, Temple of Heaven, Summer Palace, Ming Tombs, Zhoukoudian Peking Man Site, Beijing Central Axis and parts of the Great Wall and the Grand Canal—all of which are popular tourist locations. Siheyuans, the city's traditional housing style, and hutongs, the narrow alleys between siheyuans, are major tourist attractions and are common in urban Beijing.

Beijing's public universities make up more than one-fifth of Double First-Class Construction universities, and many of them consistently rank among the best in the Asia-Pacific and the world, including Tsinghua University, Peking University and UCAS. Beijing CBD is a center for Beijing's economic expansion, with the ongoing or recently completed construction of multiple skyscrapers. Beijing's Zhongguancun area is a world leading center of scientific and technological innovation, as well as entrepreneurship. Beijing has been ranked the city with the largest scientific research output by the Nature Index since the list's inception in 2016. Beijing hosts 176 foreign embassies, as well as the headquarters of many organizations, including the Asian Infrastructure Investment Bank, the Shanghai Cooperation Organisation, the Silk Road Fund, the Chinese Academy of Sciences, the Chinese Academy of Engineering, the Chinese Academy of Social Sciences, the Central Academy of Fine Arts, the Central Academy of Drama, the Central Conservatory of Music, and the Red Cross Society of China.

== Etymology ==
Over the past 3,000 years, the city of Beijing has had numerous other names. The name Beijing, which means 'Northern Capital' (from the Chinese characters 北 běi for 'north' and 京 jīng for 'capital'), was applied to the city in 1403 during the Ming dynasty to distinguish the city from Nanjing (南京, 'Southern Capital'). The English spelling Beijing is based on the government's official romanization (adopted in the 1980s) of the two characters as they are pronounced in Standard Mandarin. An older English spelling, Peking, was used by Jesuit missionary Martino Martini in a popular atlas published in Amsterdam in 1655. Although Peking is no longer the common name for the city, some of the city's older locations and facilities, such as Beijing Capital International Airport, with the IATA code PEK, and Peking University, still retain the former romanization.

The single Chinese character abbreviation for Beijing is 京, which appears on automobile license plates in the city. The official Latin alphabet abbreviation for Beijing is "BJ".

== History ==
=== Early history ===
The earliest traces of human habitation in the Beijing municipality were found in the caves of Dragon Bone Hill near the village of Zhoukoudian in Fangshan District, where Peking Man lived. Homo erectus fossils from the caves date to 230,000 to 250,000 years ago. Paleolithic Homo sapiens also lived there more recently, about 27,000 years ago. Archaeologists have found neolithic settlements throughout the municipality, including in Wangfujing, located in central Beijing.

The first walled city in Beijing was Ji, the eponymous capital city of the state of Ji. Within modern Beijing, Ji was located around the present Guang'anmen area in the south of Xicheng District. During the early Zhou period, this settlement was conquered by the state of Yan (11th century BC – 222 BC), whose original capital was located 45 kilometres (28 mi) southwest in Fangshan District, and made its new capital. Yan eventually became one of the seven major states of China during the Warring States period (c. 475 – 221 BC).

=== Early and Mid-Imperial China ===
After the First Emperor unified China in 221 BC, Ji became the capital of Guangyang Commandery. During the Han dynasty (202 BC – 220 AD), the city was first the capital of the subordinate Kingdom of Yan, and later again the seat of Guangyang Commandery after the kingdom was abolished. The Han divided the empire into 13 provinces, with Ji being the capital of You Province. During the Three Kingdoms period, it was held by Gongsun Zan and Yuan Shao before falling to Cao Cao. The AD third-century Western Jin demoted the town, placing the prefectural seat in neighboring Zhuozhou. During the Sixteen Kingdoms period when northern China was conquered and divided by the Wu Hu, Ji was briefly the capital of the Xianbei Former Yan Kingdom.

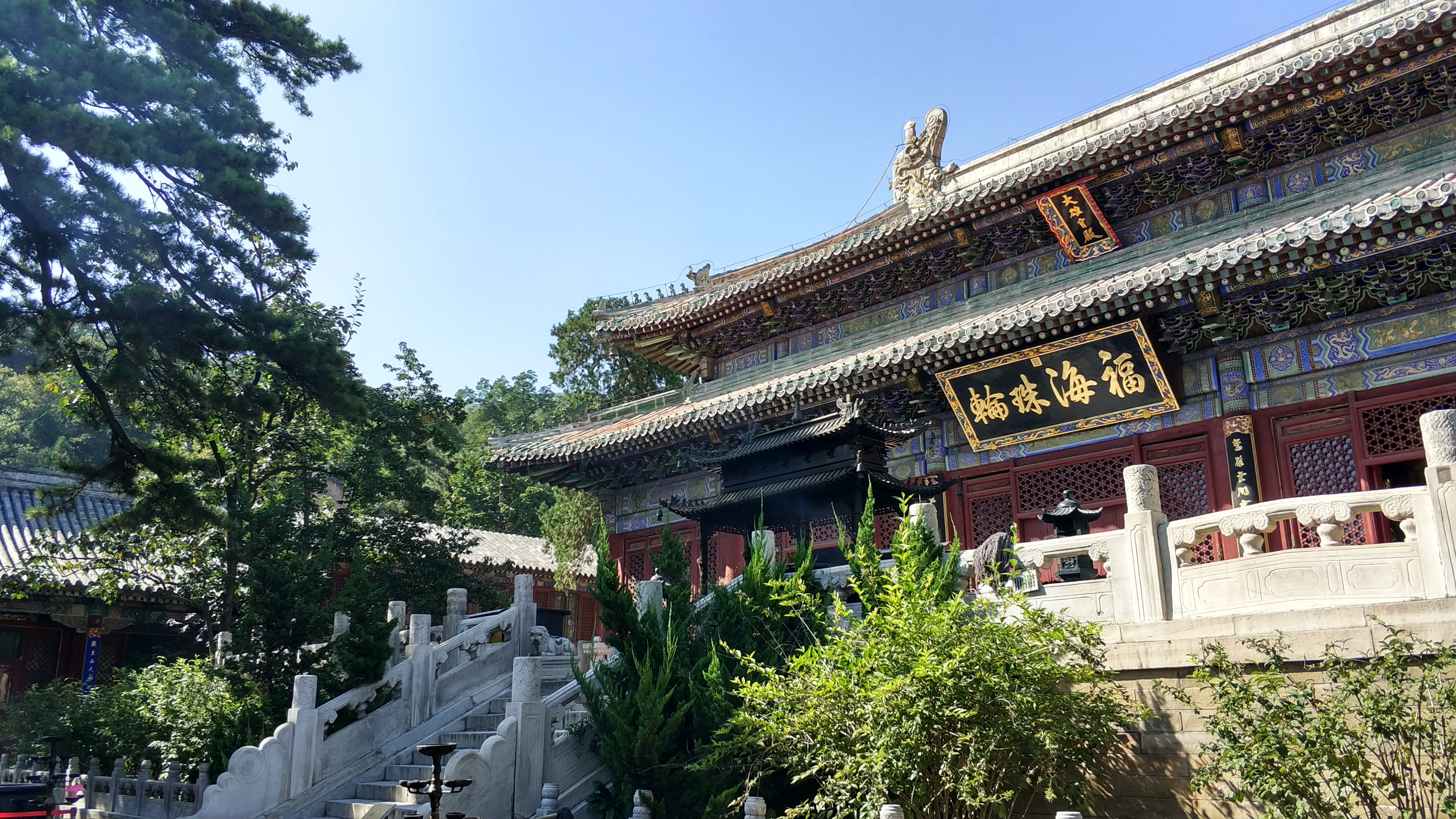
The Mahāvīra Hall of Tanzhe Temple, founded in 307 CE during the Western Jin dynasty

After China was reunified by the Sui dynasty in 581, Ji, as the seat of Zhuo Commandery, became the northern terminus of the Grand Canal. Under the Tang dynasty, Ji as the center of You Prefecture (Youzhou), served as a military frontier command center. During the An-Shi Rebellion and again amidst the turmoil of the mid-Tang period, the rebel commander An Lushan founded the short-lived Yan dynasty and called the city Yanjing, or the "Yan Capital". Also in the Tang dynasty, the city's name Ji was replaced by Youzhou or Yanjing. In 938, after the fall of the Later Tang dynasty, the Later Jin ceded the frontier territory including what is now Beijing to the Khitan Liao dynasty, which treated the city as Nanjing, or the "Southern Capital", one of four secondary capitals to complement its "Supreme Capital" Shangjing (in modern Baarin Left Banner, Inner Mongolia). Some of the oldest surviving pagodas in Beijing date to the Liao period, including the Tianning Pagoda.

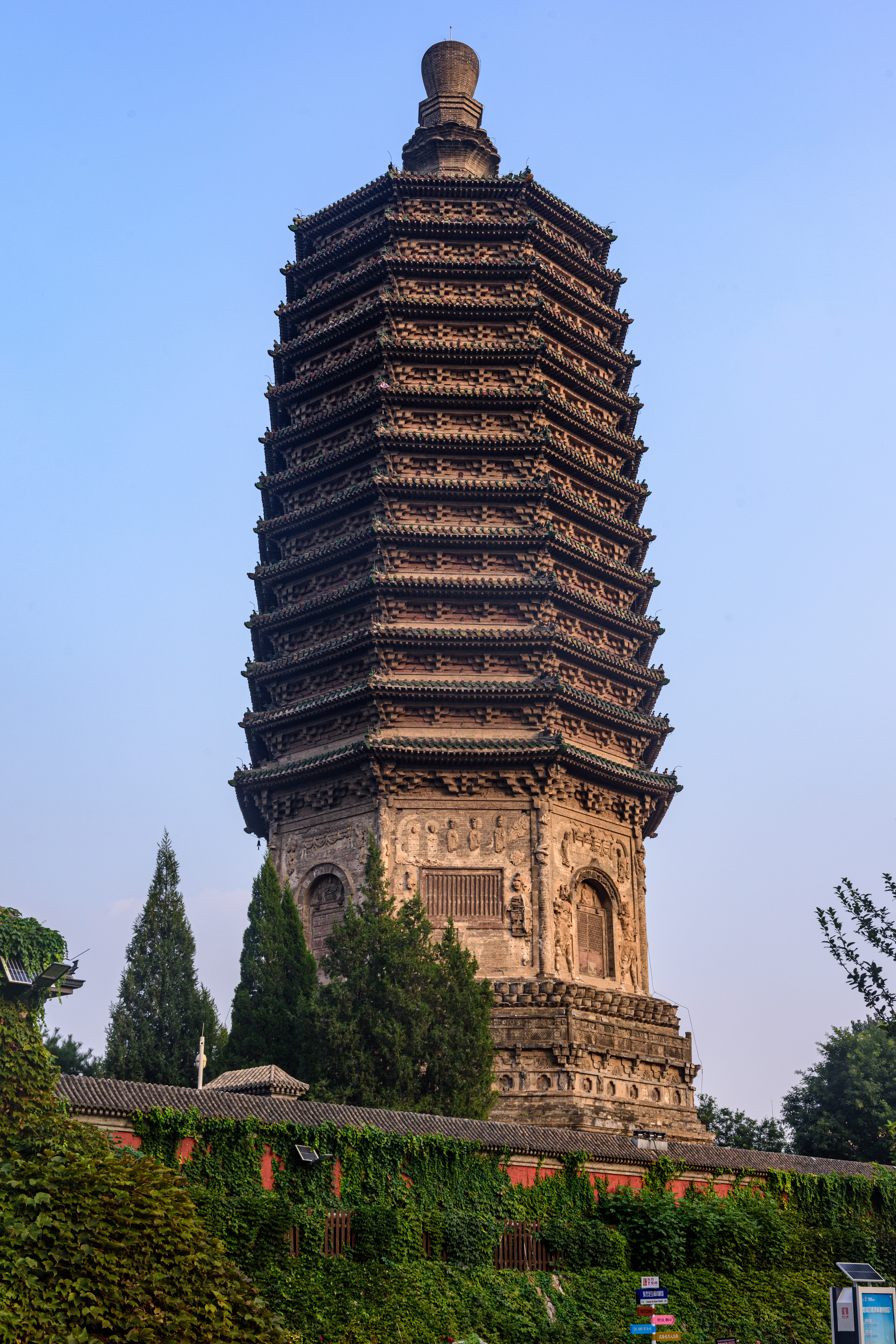
The Tianning Pagoda, built around 1120 during the Liao dynasty, one of the oldest surviving structures in Beijing

The Liao fell to the Jurchen Jin dynasty in 1122, which gave the city to the Song dynasty and then retook it in 1125 during its conquest of northern China. In 1153, the Jurchen Jin made Beijing their "Central Capital", or Zhongdu. The city was besieged by Genghis Khan's invading Mongolian army in 1213 and razed to the ground two years later. Two generations later, Kublai Khan ordered the construction of Dadu (or Daidu to the Mongols, commonly known as Khanbaliq), a new capital for his Yuan dynasty to the northeast of the Zhongdu ruins. The construction took from 1264 to 1293, but greatly enhanced the status of a city on the northern fringe of China proper. The city was centered on the Drum Tower slightly to the north of modern Beijing and stretched from the present-day Chang'an Avenue to the northern part of Line 10 subway. Remnants of the Yuan rammed earth wall still stand and are known as the Tucheng.

=== Ming dynasty ===
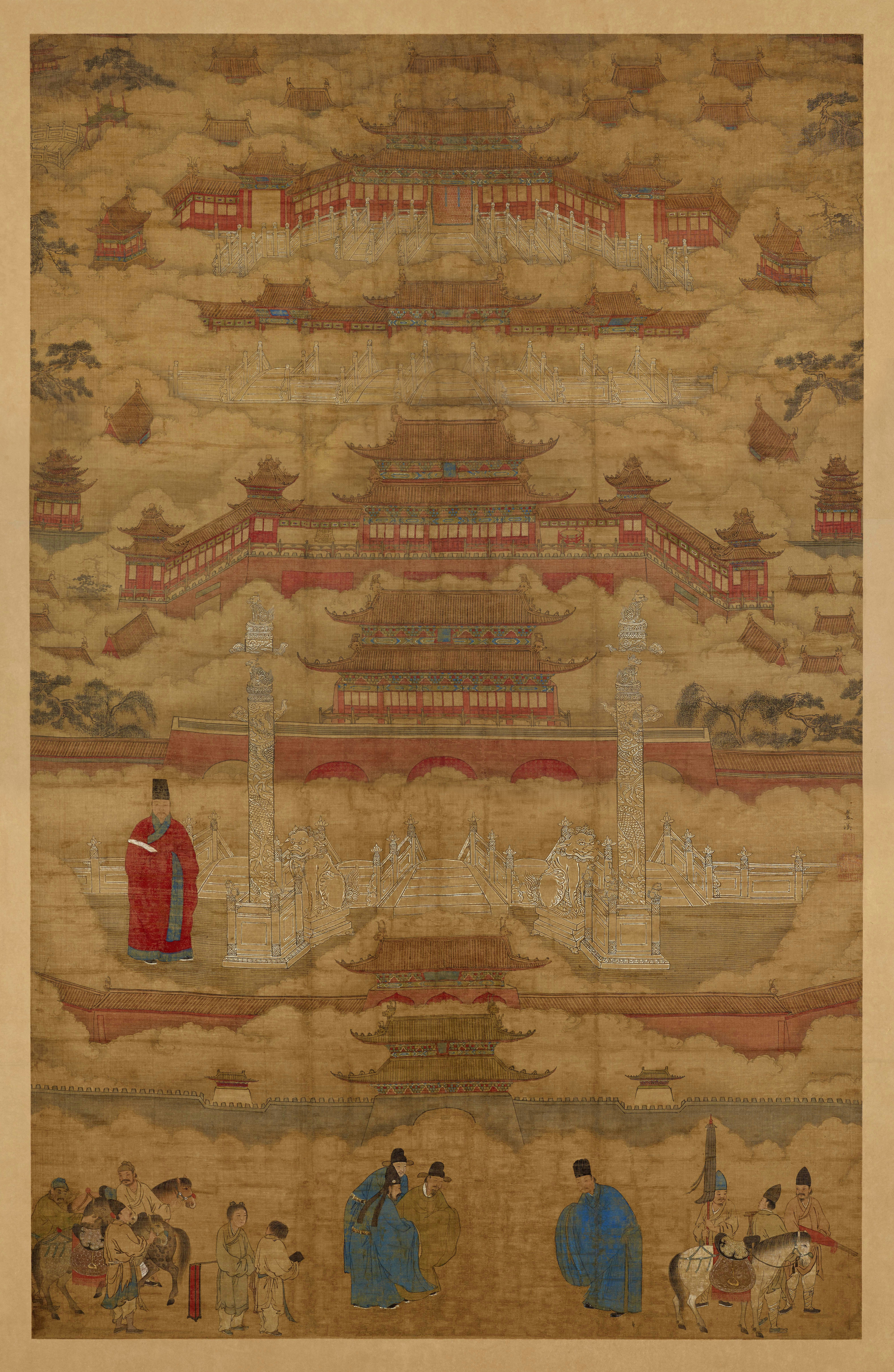
A Ming dynasty silk hanging scroll depicting the Forbidden City with its architect Kuai Xiang standing before Chengtian Gate (present-day Tiananmen); British Museum, London

In 1368, soon after declaring the new Hongwu era of the Ming dynasty, the rebel leader Zhu Yuanzhang captured Dadu/Khanbaliq and razed the Yuan palaces to the ground. Since the Yuan continued to occupy Shangdu and Mongolia, Dadu was used to supply the Ming military garrisons in the area and renamed Beiping (Wade–Giles: Peip'ing, "Northern Peace"). Under the Hongwu Emperor's feudal policies, Beiping was given to his son Zhu Di, who was created "Prince of Yan".

The early death of Zhu Yuanzhang's heir led to a succession struggle upon his death, one that ended with the victory of Zhu Di and the declaration of the new Yongle era. Since his harsh treatment of the Ming capital Yingtian (modern Nanjing) alienated many there, he established his fief as a new co-capital. The city of Beiping became Beijing ("Northern Capital") or Shuntian in 1403. The construction of the new imperial residence, the Forbidden City, took from 1406 to 1420; this period was also responsible for several other of the modern city's major attractions, such as the Temple of Heaven and Tian'anmen. On 28 October 1420, the city was officially designated the capital of the Ming dynasty in the same year that the Forbidden City was completed. Beijing became the empire's primary capital, and Yingtian, also called Nanjing ("Southern Capital"), became the co-capital. (A 1425 order by Zhu Di's son, the Hongxi Emperor, to return the primary capital to Nanjing was never carried out: he died, probably of a heart attack, the next month. He was buried, like almost every Ming emperor to follow him, in an elaborate necropolis to Beijing's north.)

By the 15th century, Beijing had essentially taken its current shape. The Ming city wall continued to serve until 1965, when it was pulled down and the Beijing Subway was built on its foundations. It is generally believed that Beijing was the largest city in the world for most of the 15th, 16th, 17th, and 18th centuries. The first known church was constructed by Catholics in 1652 at the former site of Matteo Ricci's chapel; the modern Nantang Cathedral was later built upon the same site.

The capture of Beijing by Li Zicheng's peasant army in 1644 ended the dynasty, but he and his Shun court abandoned the city without a fight when the Manchu army of Prince Dorgon of the Qing dynasty arrived 40 days later.

=== Qing dynasty ===
Beijing was declared the sole capital of the empire in 1644. The Qing emperors made some modifications to the Imperial residence but, in large part, the Ming buildings and the general layout remained unchanged. Facilities for Manchu worship were introduced, but the Qing also continued the traditional state rituals. Signage was bilingual or Chinese. This early Qing Beijing later formed the setting for the Chinese novel Dream of the Red Chamber. Northwest of the city, Qing emperors built several large palatial gardens including the Old Summer Palace and the Summer Palace.

During the Second Opium War, Anglo-French forces captured the outskirts of the city, looting and burning the Old Summer Palace in 1860. Under the Convention of Peking (Note: When Europeans first came into sustained contact with China, "Pekin" and "Peking" were the most popular ways of romanizing the name of Beijing.) ending that war, Western powers for the first time secured the right to establish permanent diplomatic presences within the city. From 14 to 15 August 1900 the Battle of Peking was fought. This battle was part of the Boxer Rebellion. The attempt by the Boxers to eradicate this presence, as well as Chinese Christian converts, led to Beijing's reoccupation by eight foreign powers. During the fighting, several important structures were destroyed, including the Hanlin Academy and the (new) Summer Palace. A peace agreement was concluded between the Eight-Nation Alliance and representatives of the Chinese government Li Hongzhang and Yikuang on 7 September 1901. The treaty required China to pay an indemnity of US$335 million (over US$4 billion in current dollars) plus interest over a period of 39 years. Also required was the execution or exile of government supporters of the Boxers and the destruction of Chinese forts and other defenses in much of northern China. Ten days after the treaty was signed the foreign armies left Beijing, although legation guards would remain there until World War II.

With the treaty signed the Empress Dowager Cixi returned to Beijing from her "tour of inspection" on 7 January 1902 and the rule of the Qing dynasty over China was restored, albeit much weakened by the defeat it had suffered in the Boxer Rebellion and by the indemnity and stipulations of the peace treaty. The Dowager died in 1908 and the dynasty imploded in 1911.

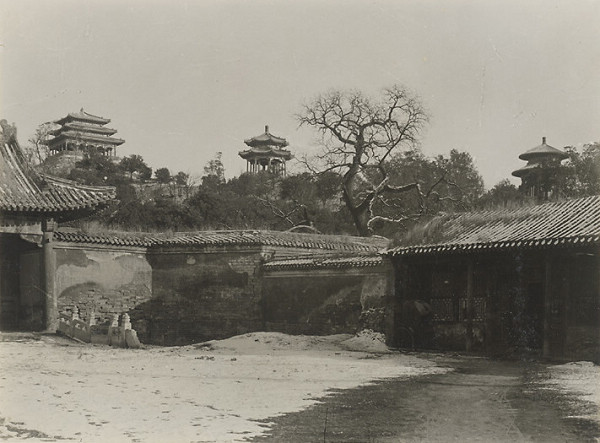
Jingshan Park, Late Qing dynasty

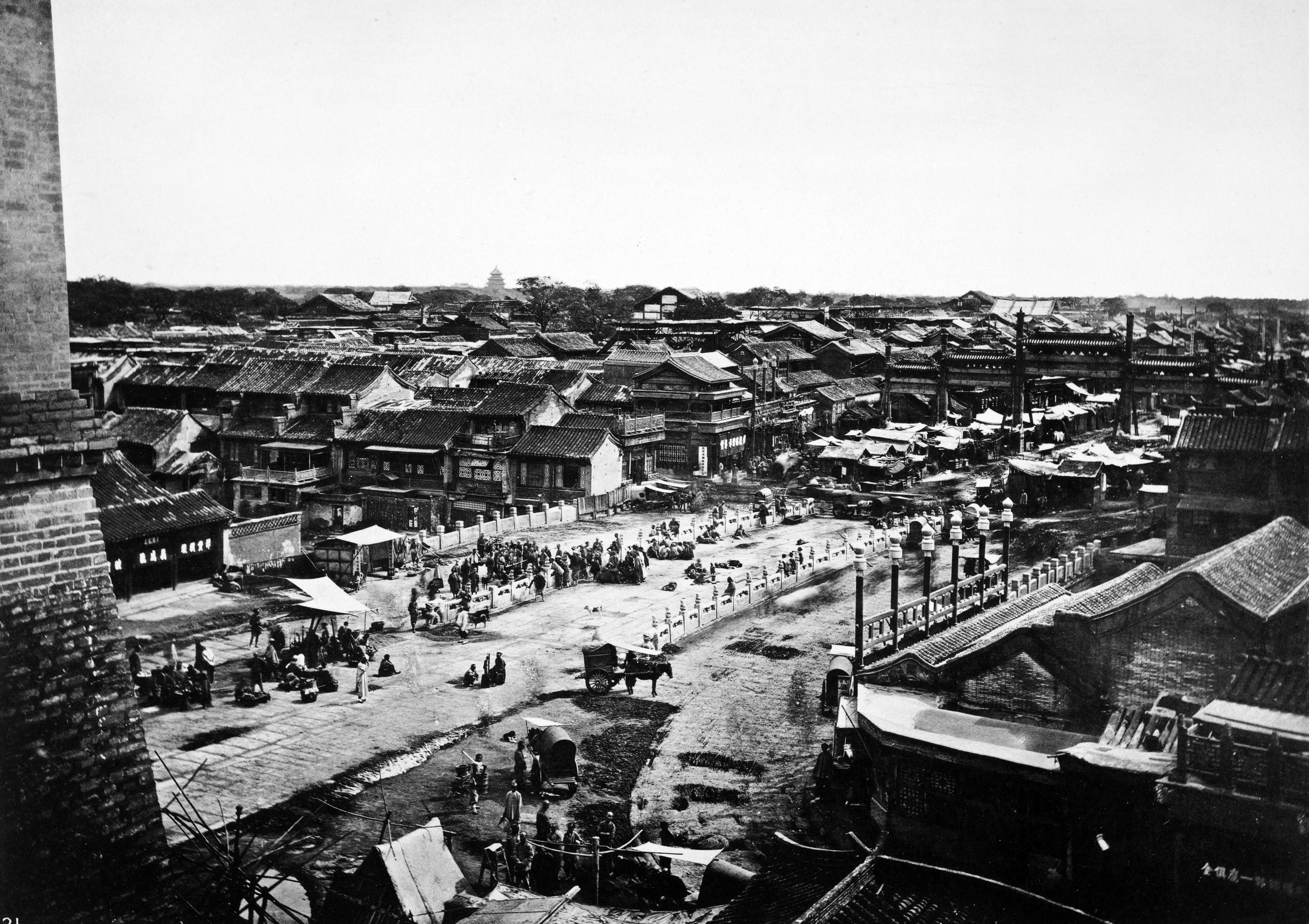
A view from the city wall over the rooftops and courtyard compounds of Beijing, photographed by John Thomson c. 1871

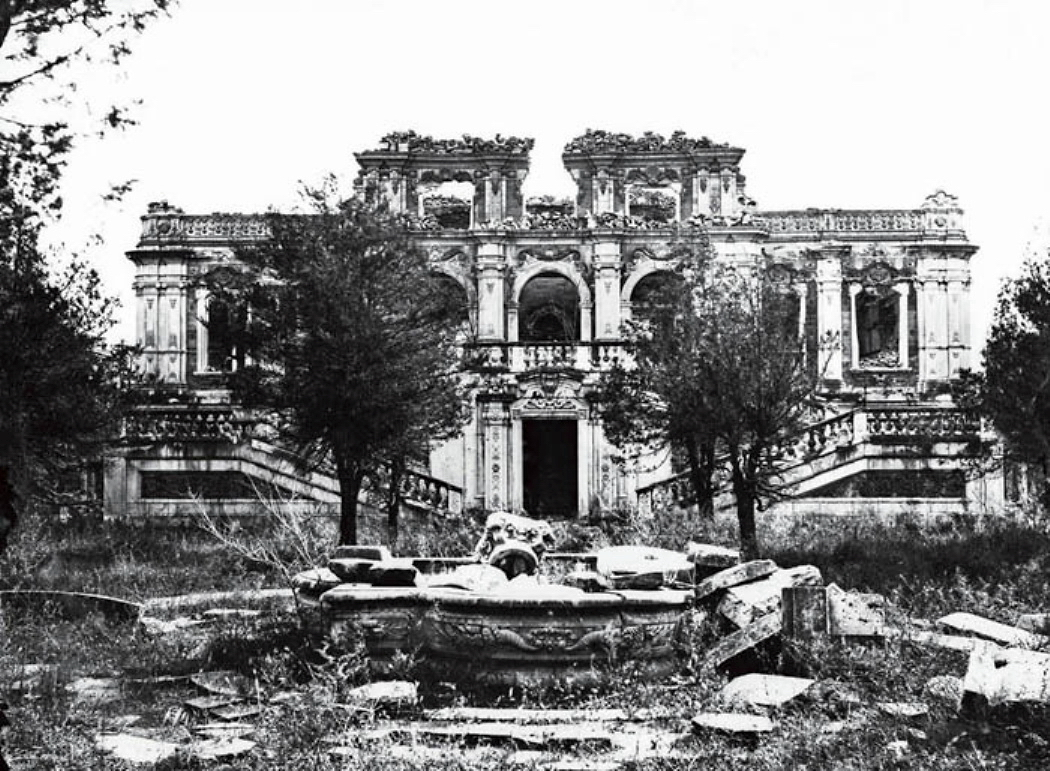
The Old Summer Palace, photographed by Ernst Ohlmer, c. 1872–1873, approximately a decade after the complex was looted and burned by Anglo-French forces in 1860

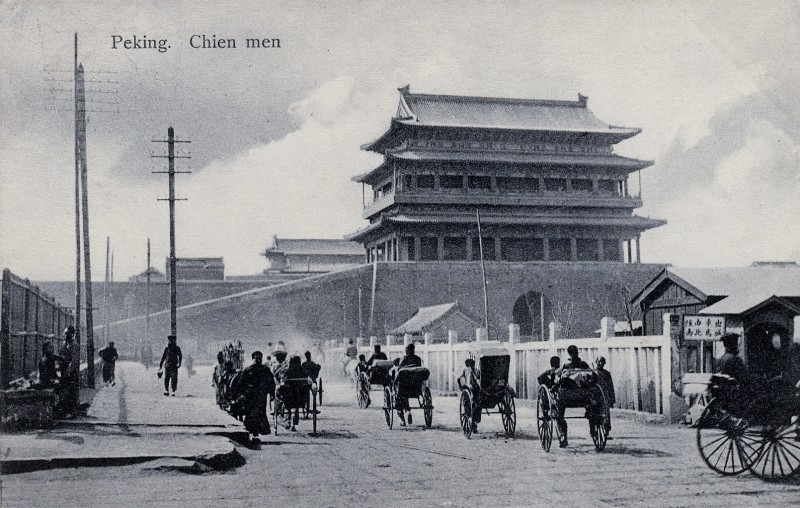
Zhengyangmen (Qianmen, "Front Gate"), the principal southern gate of the city, photographed c. 1905

=== Republic of China ===
The fomenters of the Xinhai Revolution of 1911 sought to replace Qing rule with a republic and leaders like Sun Yat-sen originally intended to return the capital to Nanjing. After the Qing general Yuan Shikai forced the abdication of the last Qing emperor and ensured the success of the revolution, the revolutionaries accepted him as president of the new Republic of China. Yuan maintained his capital at Beijing and quickly consolidated power, declaring himself emperor in 1915. His death less than a year later left China under the control of the warlords commanding the regional armies. Following the success of the Kuomintang's Northern Expedition, the capital was formally moved to Nanjing in 1928. On 28 June the same year, Beijing's name was returned to Beiping (written at the time as "Peiping").

On 7 July 1937, the 29th Army and the Japanese army in China exchanged fire at the Marco Polo Bridge near the Wanping Fortress southwest of the city. The Marco Polo Bridge Incident triggered the Second Sino-Japanese War, World War II as it is known in China. During the war, Beijing fell to Japan on 29 July 1937 and was made the seat of the Provisional Government of the Republic of China, a puppet state that ruled the ethnic-Chinese portions of Japanese-occupied northern China. This government was later merged into the larger Wang Jingwei government based in Nanjing.

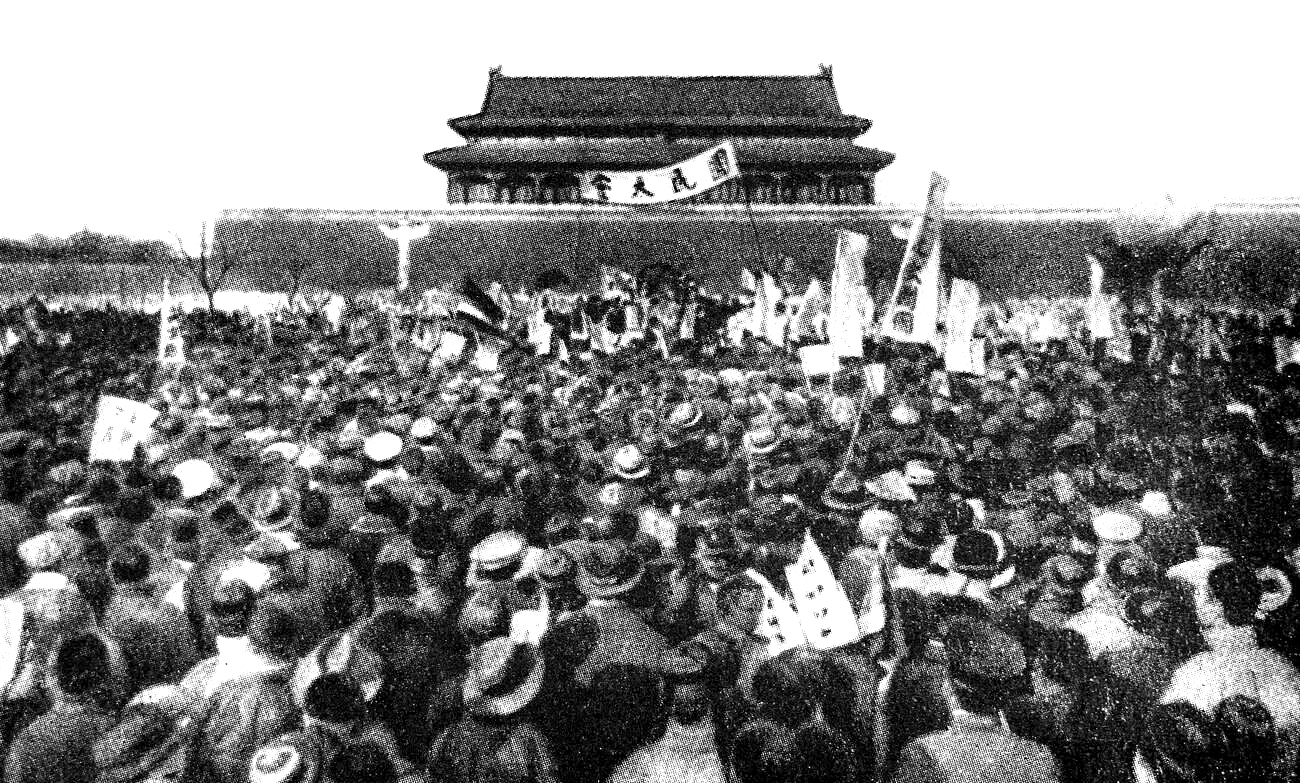
Chinese protestors march against the Treaty of Versailles (May 4, 1919), during the May Fourth Movement.

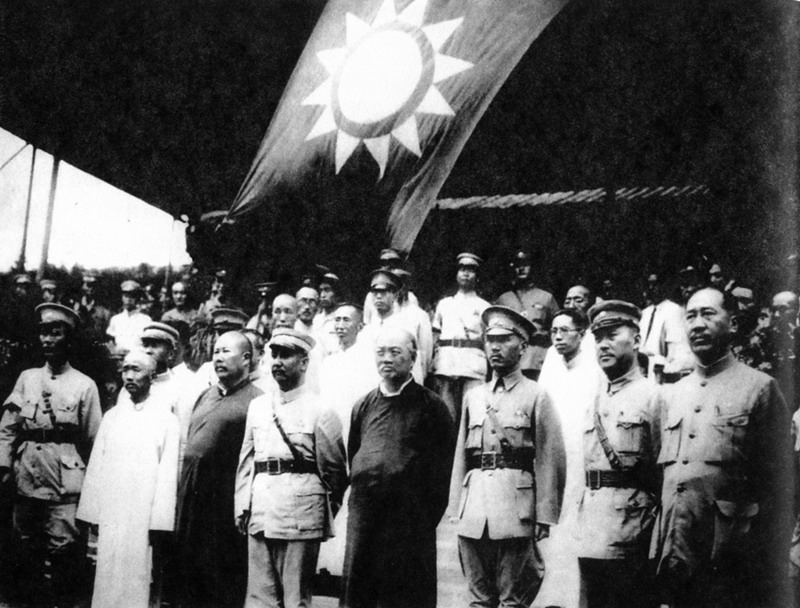
July 6, 1928, the Kuomintang leaders held memorial ceremony to Sun Yat-sen after the completion of the Northern Expedition.

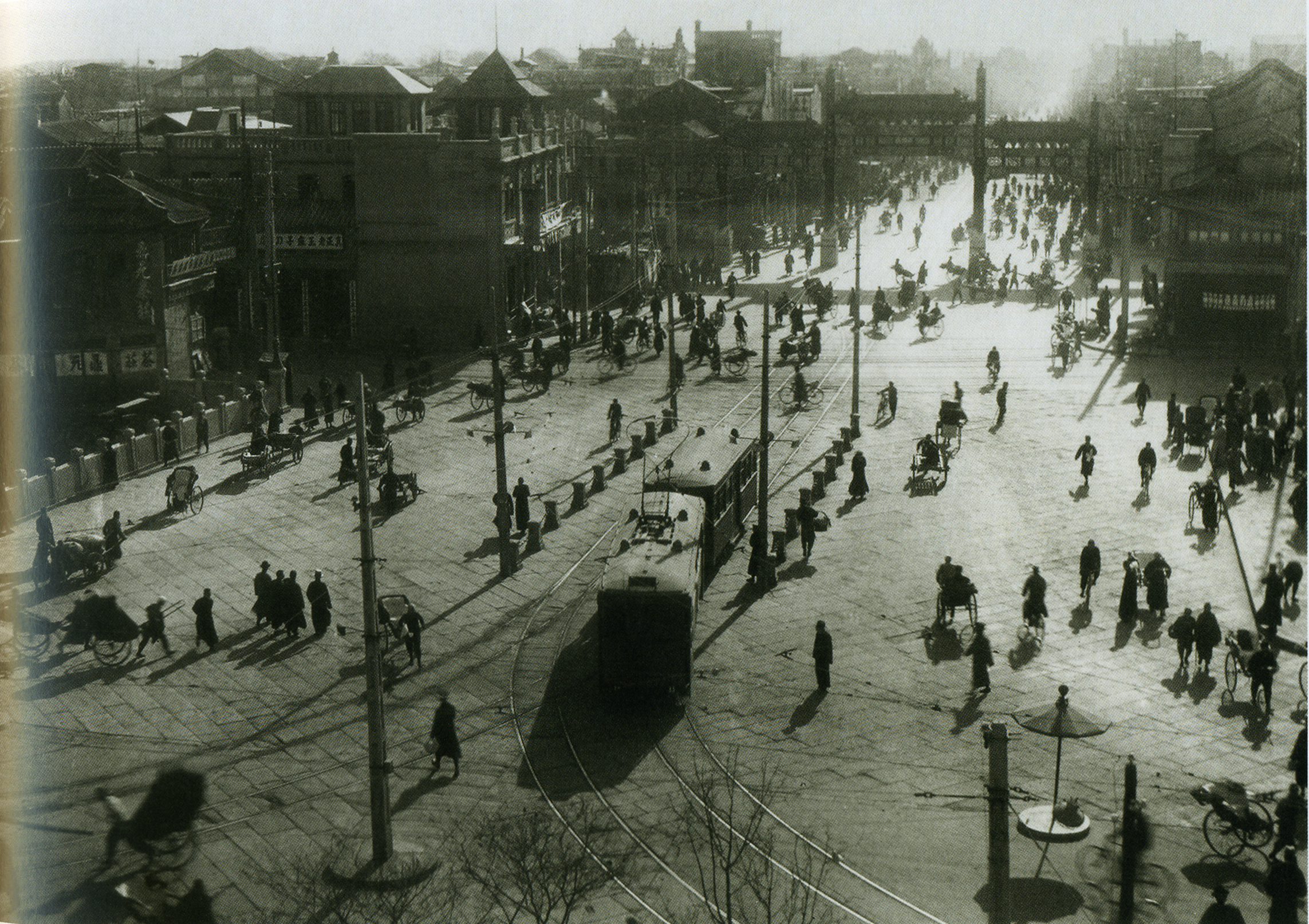
Peking during the 1930s

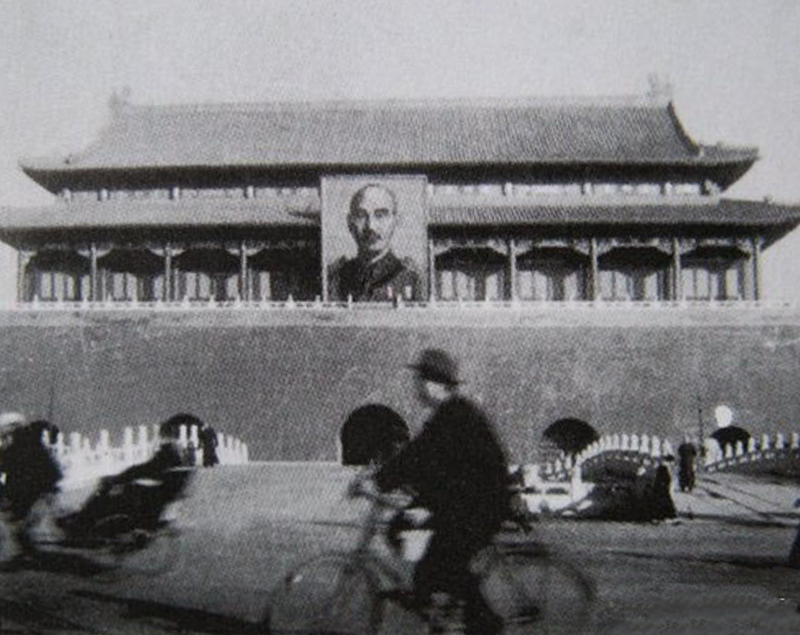
A large portrait of Chiang Kai-shek was displayed above Tiananmen after World War II

=== People's Republic of China ===
In the final phases of the Chinese Civil War, the People's Liberation Army seized control of the city peacefully on 31 January 1949 in the course of the Pingjin Campaign. On 1 October that year, Mao Zedong announced the creation of the People's Republic of China from atop Tiananmen. He restored the name of the city, as the new capital, to Beijing, a decision that had been reached by the Chinese People's Political Consultative Conference just a few days earlier.

In the 1950s, the city began to expand beyond the old walled city and its surrounding neighborhoods, with heavy industries in the west and residential neighborhoods in the north. Many areas of the Beijing city wall were torn down in the 1960s to make way for the construction of the Beijing Subway and the 2nd Ring Road.

During the Cultural Revolution from 1966 to 1976, the Red Guard movement began in Beijing and the city's government fell victim to one of the first purges. By the autumn of 1966, all city schools were shut down and over a million Red Guards from across the country gathered in Beijing for eight rallies in Tiananmen Square with Mao. The campaign took a devastating toll on Beijing's built heritage: by the end of the Cultural Revolution, 4,922 of the 6,843 sites officially designated as historically significant in the city had been destroyed or damaged, over 70 percent of the total, as Red Guards systematically targeted temples, shrines, ancestral halls, and monuments in the campaign to eliminate the "Four Olds".

In April 1976, a large public gathering of Beijing residents in Tiananmen Square, protesting against the Gang of Four and the Cultural Revolution, was forcefully suppressed. In October 1976, the Gang was arrested in Zhongnanhai and the Cultural Revolution came to an end. In December 1978, the Third Plenum of the 11th Party Congress in Beijing under the leadership of Deng Xiaoping reversed the verdicts against victims of the Cultural Revolution and instituted the reform and opening up.

Since the early 1980s, the urban area of Beijing has expanded greatly with the completion of the 2nd Ring Road in 1981 and the subsequent addition of the 3rd, 4th, 5th and 6th ring roads. According to one 2005 newspaper report, the newly developed Beijing was one-and-a-half times its previous size. Wangfujing and Xidan have developed into flourishing shopping districts, while Zhongguancun has become a major center of electronics in China. In recent years, the expansion of Beijing has also brought to the forefront some problems of urbanization, such as heavy traffic, poor air quality, the loss of historic neighborhoods, and a significant influx of migrant workers from less-developed rural areas of the country. The city has also been the location of many significant events in recent Chinese history, principally the Tiananmen Square protests of 1989. Beijing has hosted major international sporting events, including the 2008 Summer Olympics, the 2015 World Athletics Championships, and the 2022 Winter Olympics, and is the only city to have hosted both the Winter and Summer Olympics.

In terms of international connectedness, as of 2024, Beijing was one of eight cities worldwide that was classified as an "Alpha+" city by the Globalization and World Cities Research Network.

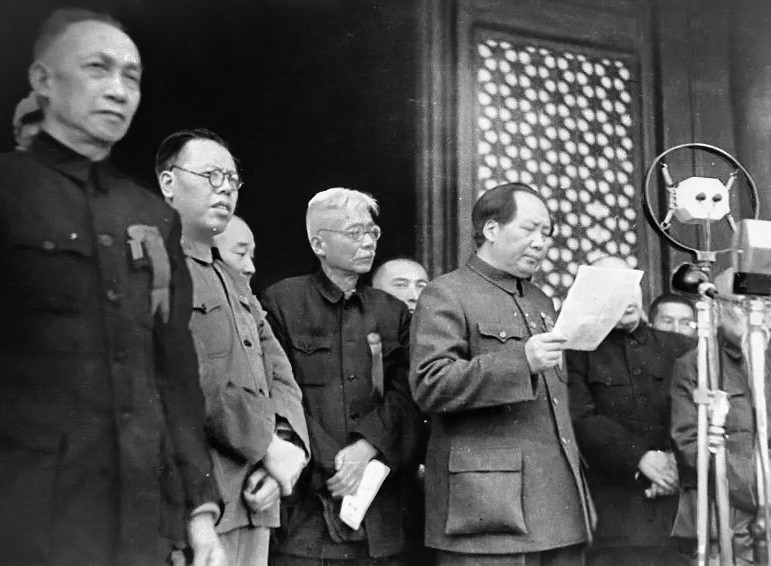
On 1 October 1949, Mao Zedong announced the founding of the People's Republic of China

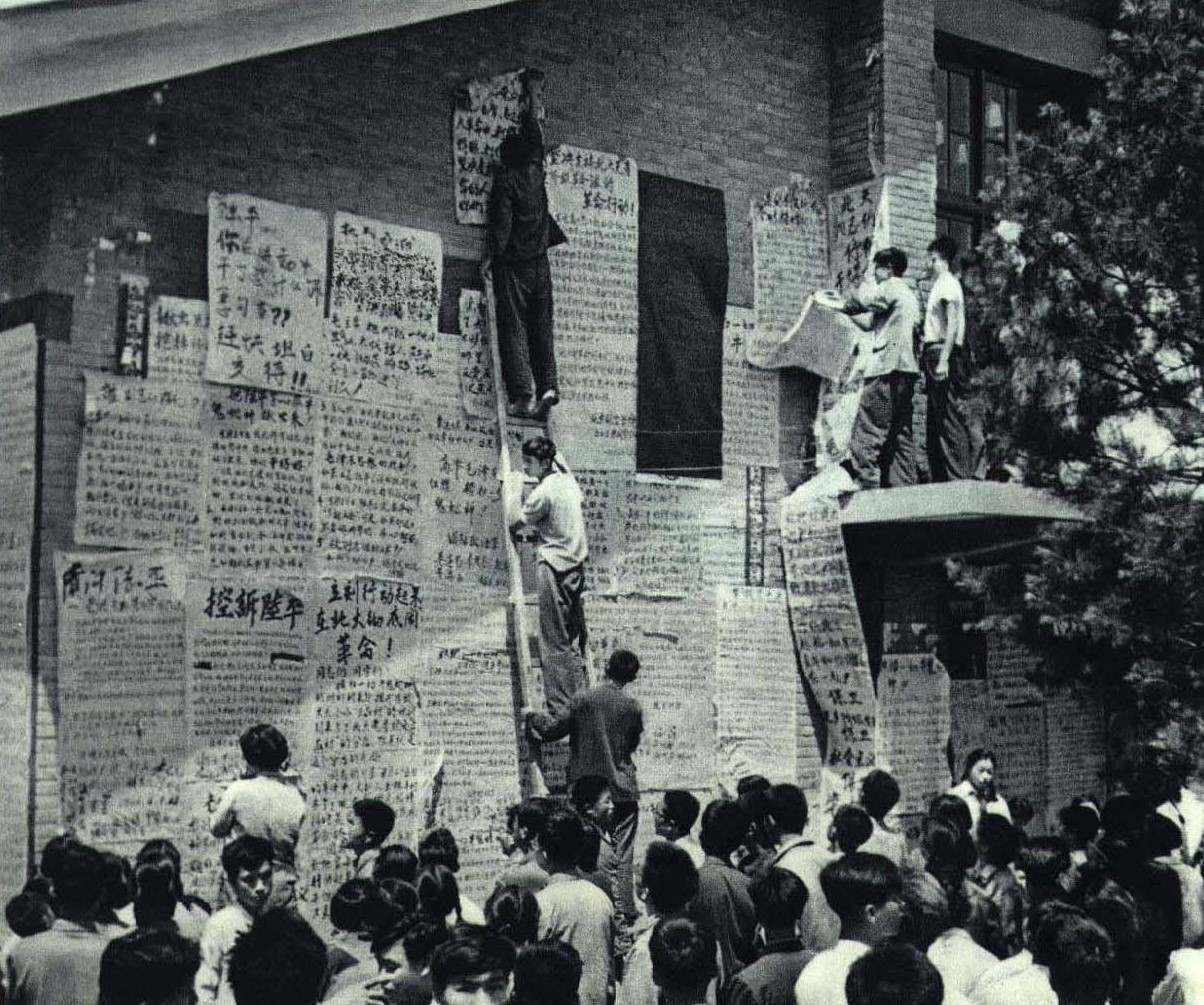
College students hang political posters during Culture Revolution

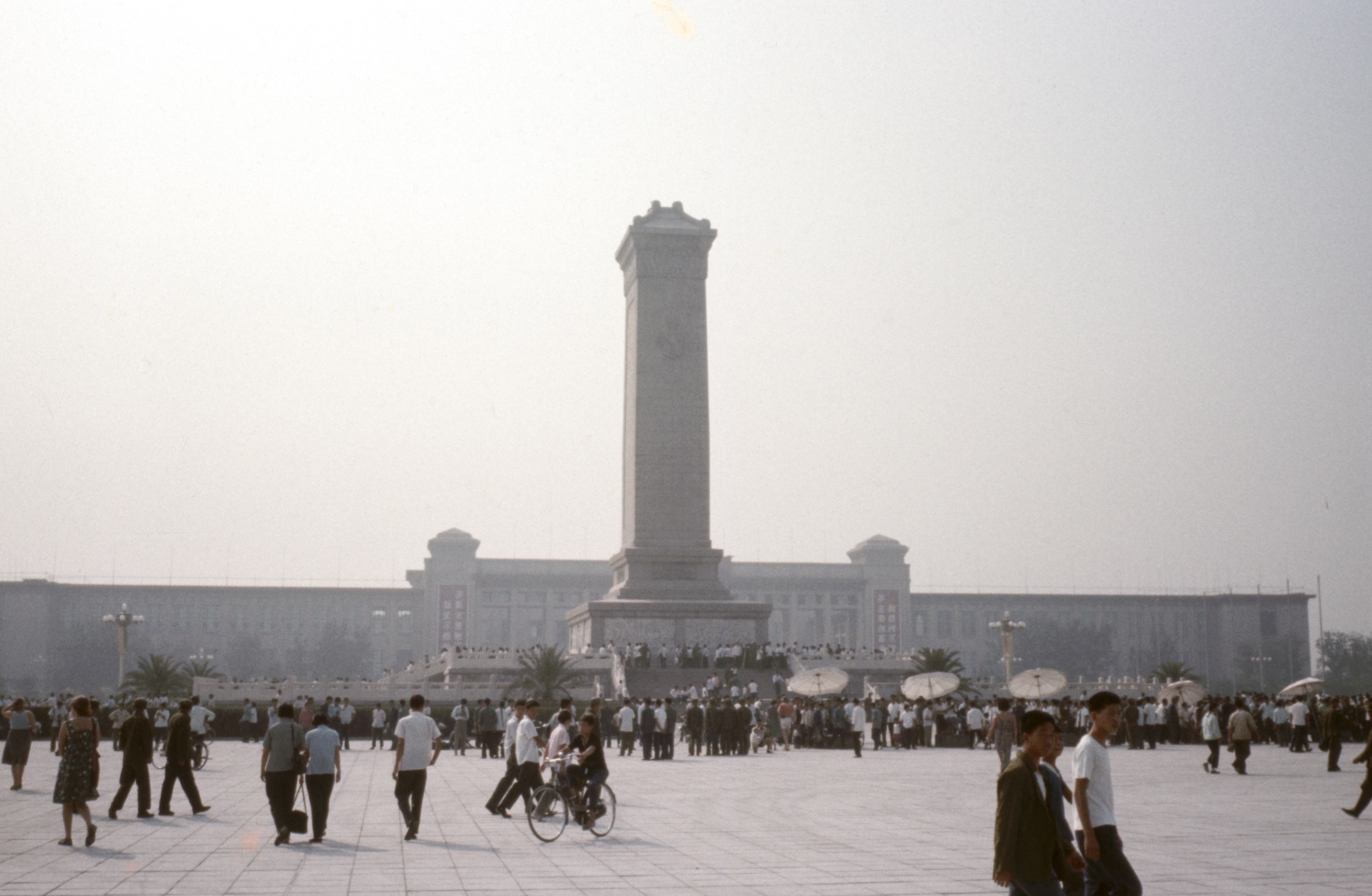
Tian'anmen Square in 1978

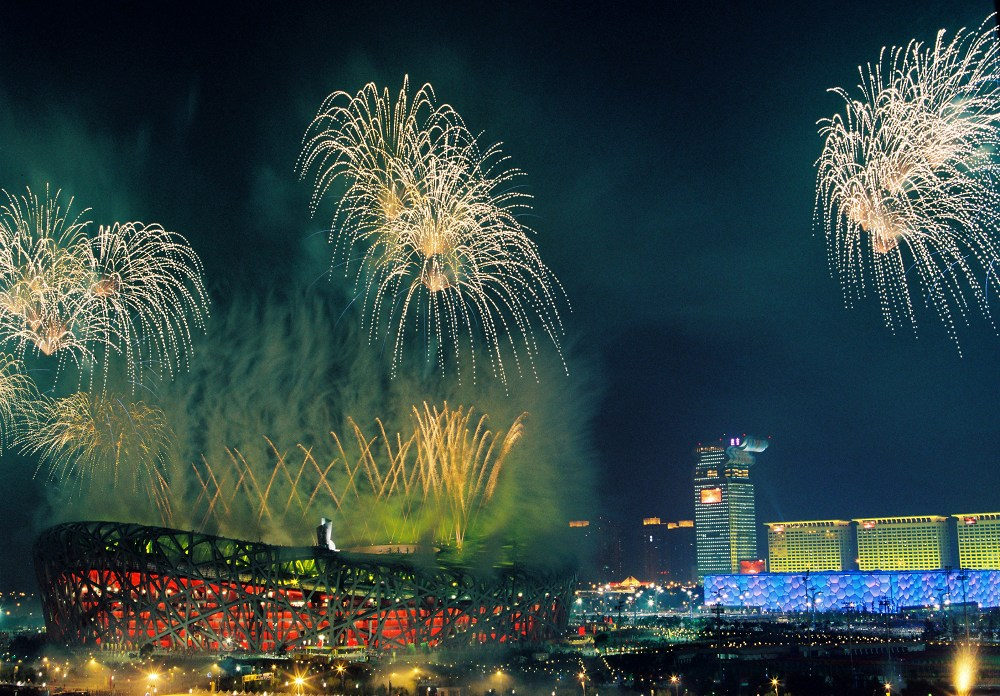
Fireworks illuminate the National Stadium ("Bird's Nest") during the opening ceremony of the 2008 Summer Olympics, Beijing.

== Cityscape ==
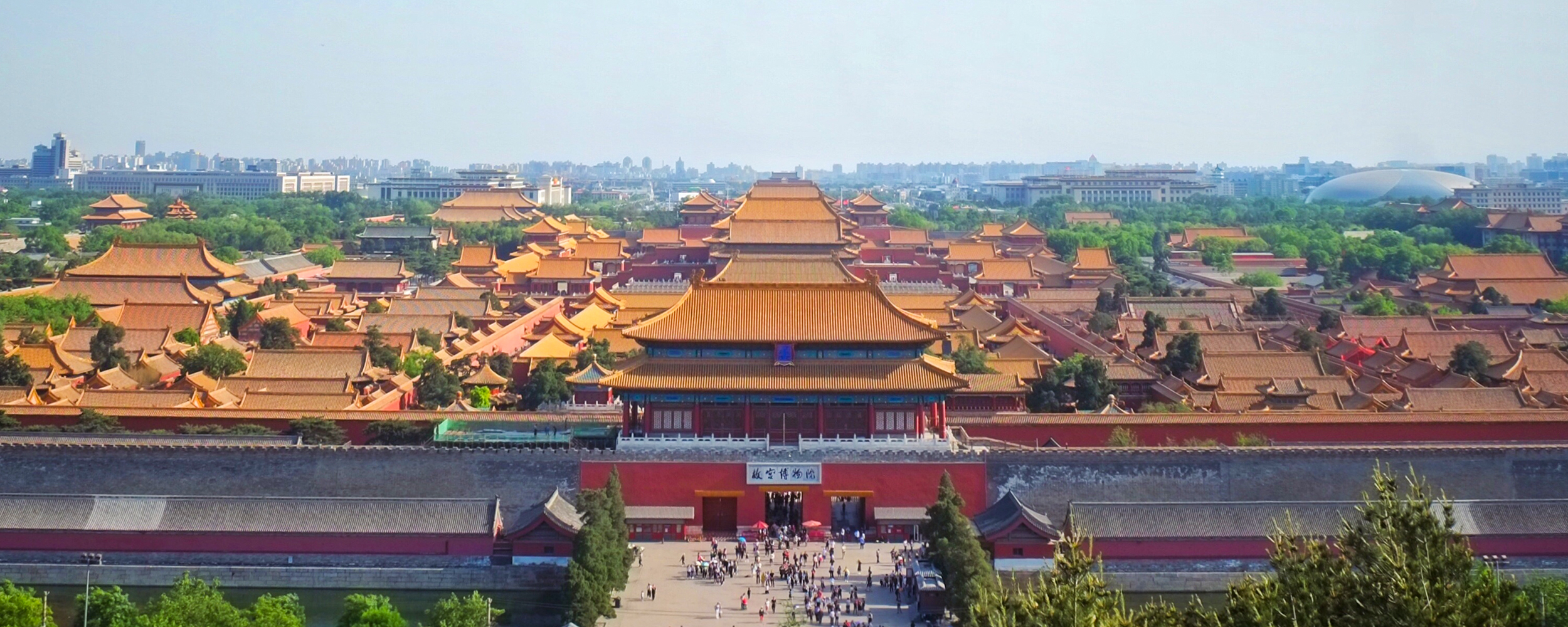
A panorama of the Forbidden City, viewed from the Jingshan Park
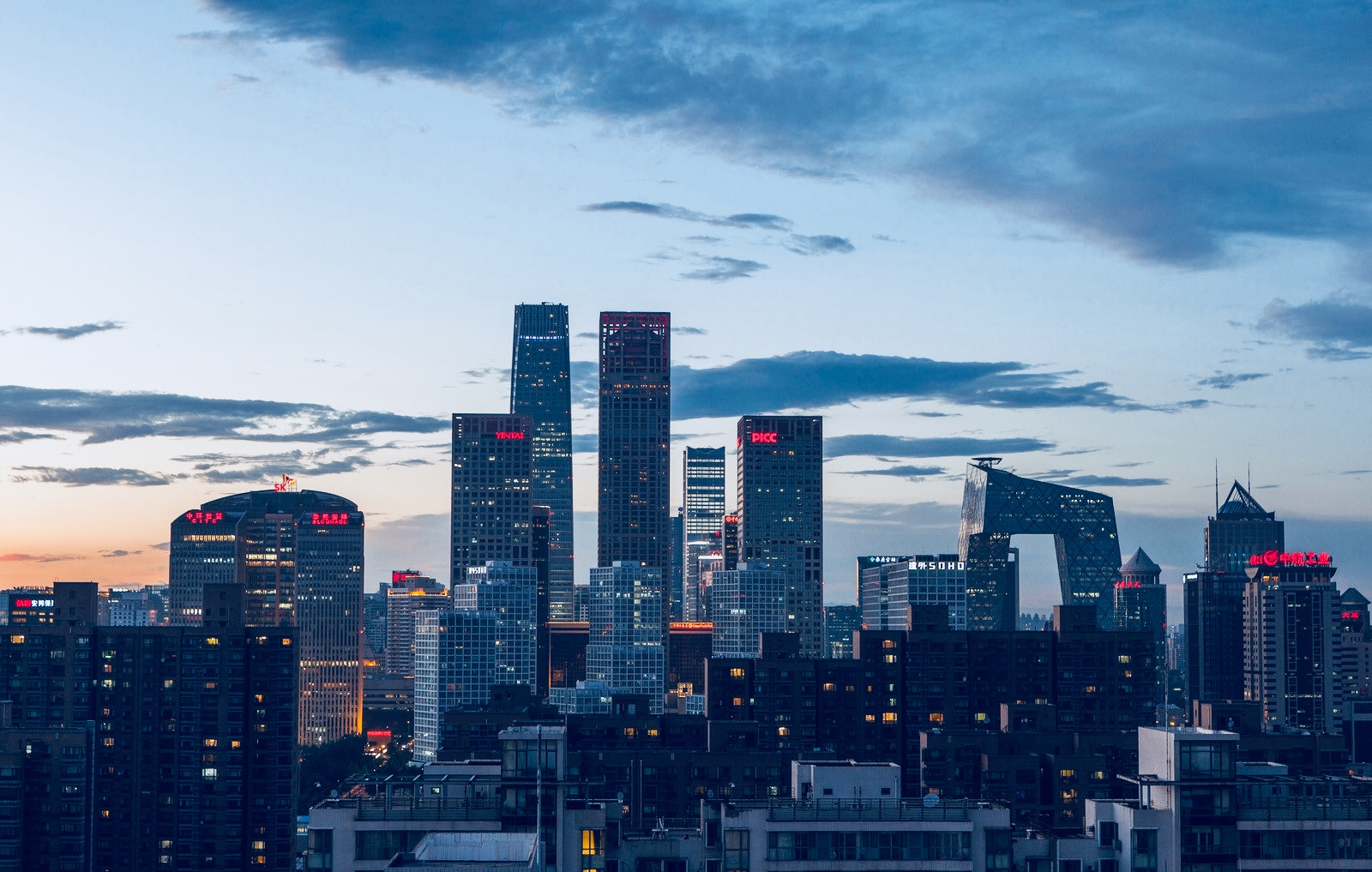
Beijing's skyline at dusk, viewed from the China World Trade Center area

=== Architecture ===
Three styles of architecture are predominant in urban Beijing. First, there is the traditional architecture of imperial China, perhaps best exemplified by the massive Tian'anmen (Gate of Heavenly Peace), which remains the People's Republic of China's trademark edifice, the Forbidden City, the Imperial Ancestral Temple and the Temple of Heaven. Next, there is what is sometimes referred to as the "Sino-Sov" style, with structures tending to be boxy and sometimes poorly constructed, which were built between the 1950s and the 1970s. Finally, there are much more modern architectural forms, most noticeably in the area of the Beijing CBD in east Beijing such as the new CCTV Headquarters, in addition to buildings in other locations around the city such as the Beijing National Stadium and National Center for the Performing Arts.

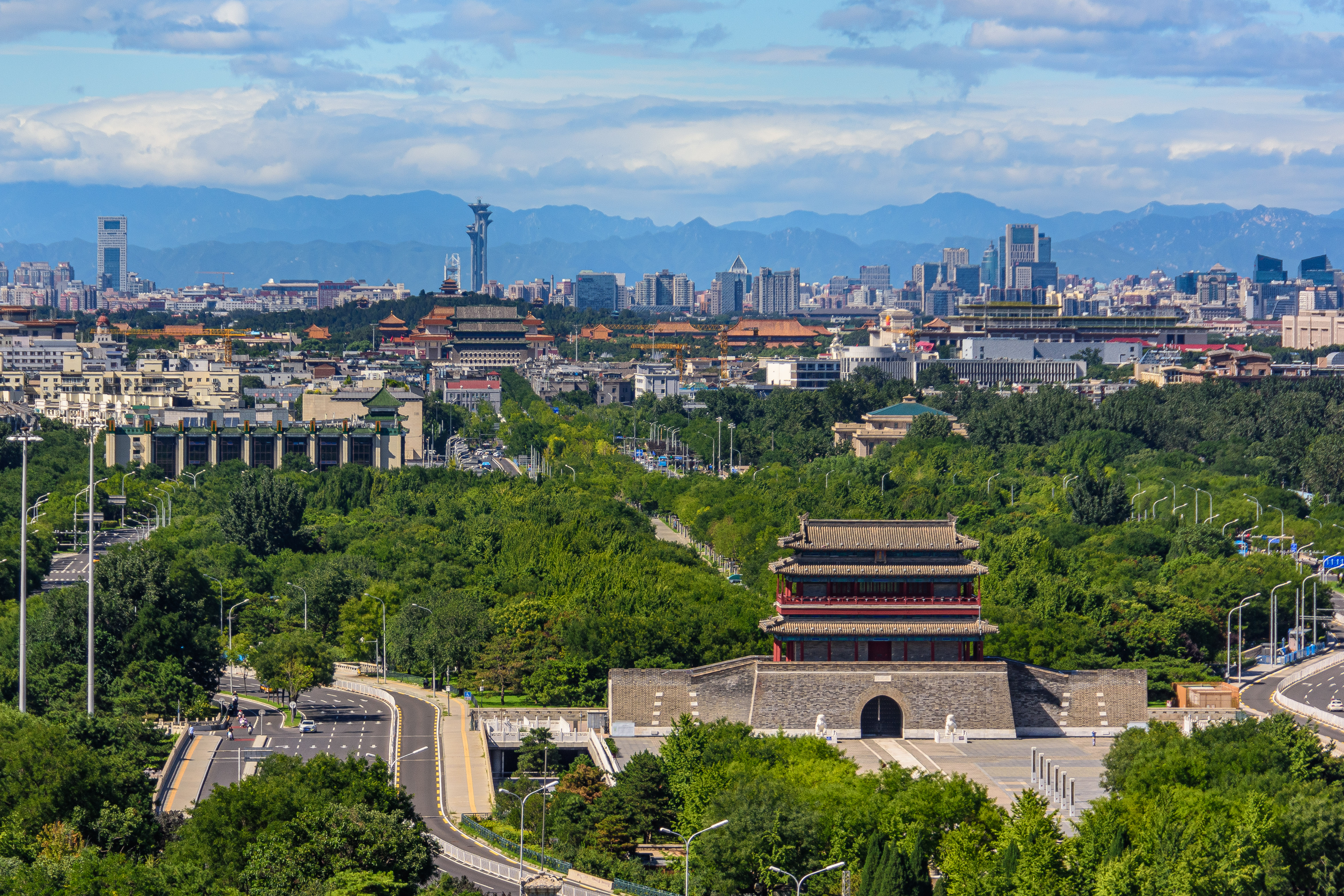
The North–South Central Axis of Beijing City

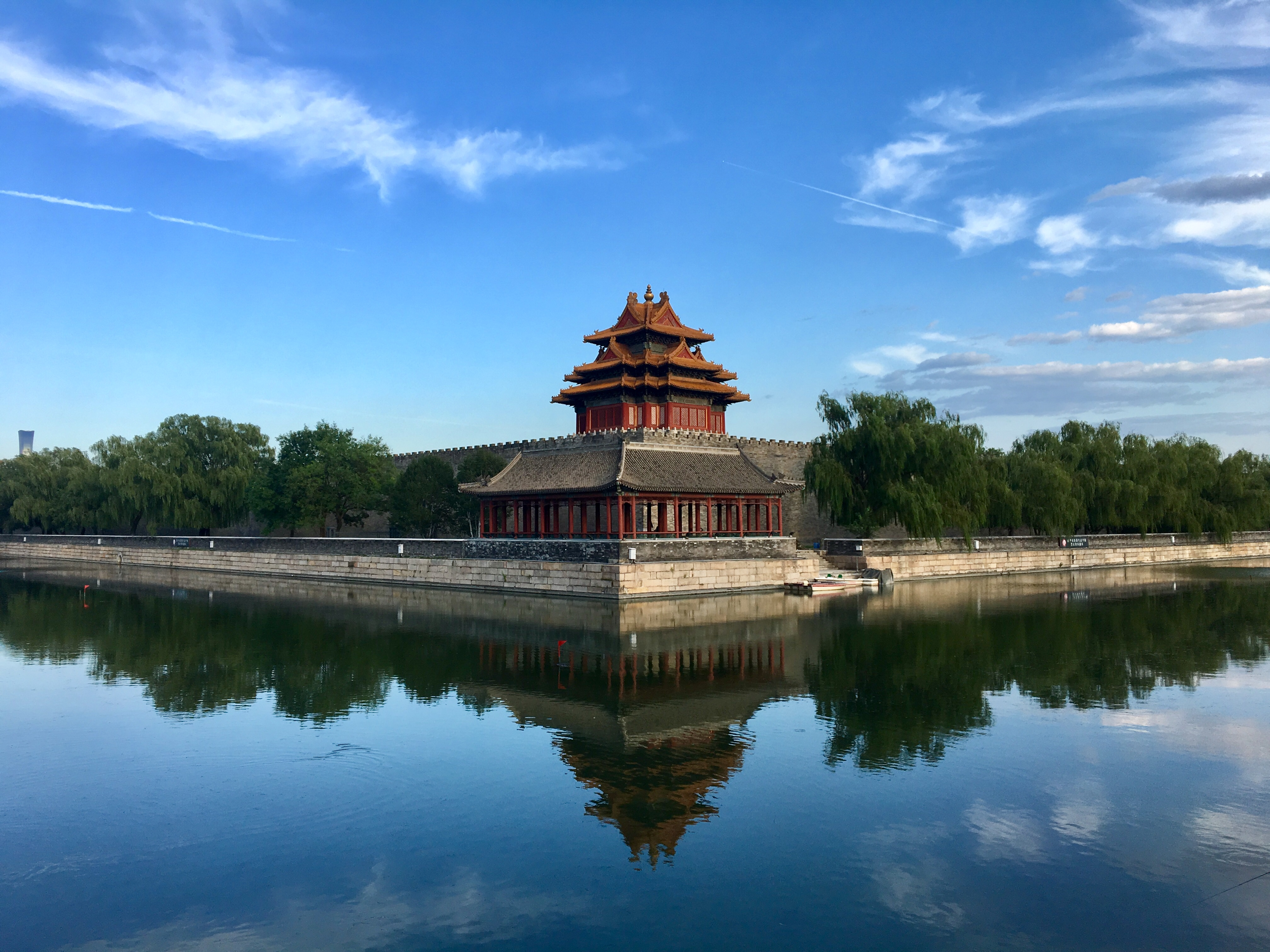
A corner tower of the Forbidden City, built by the Yongle Emperor during the early Ming dynasty

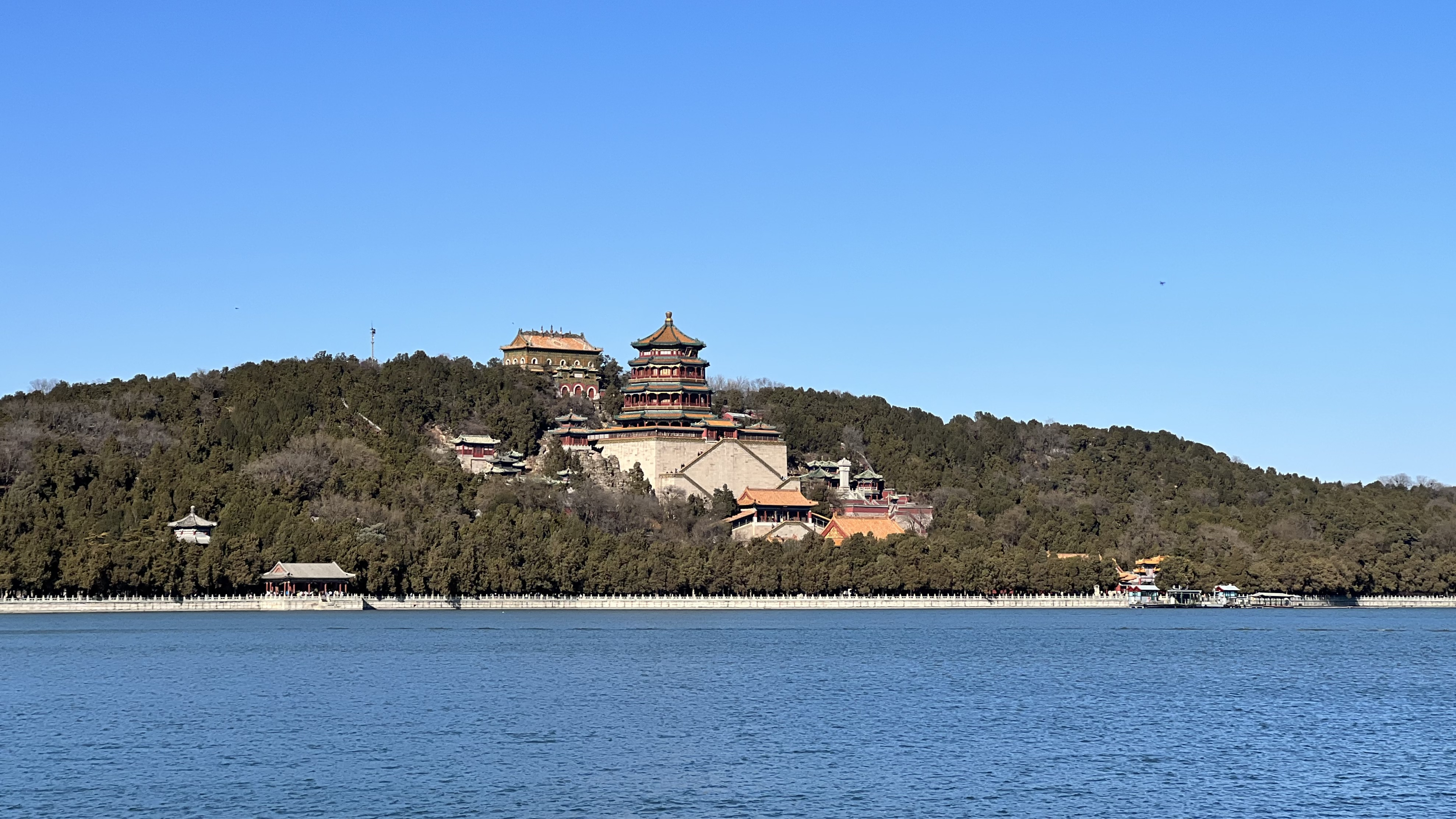
Summer Palace, one of several palatial gardens built by Qing emperors in the northwest suburb area

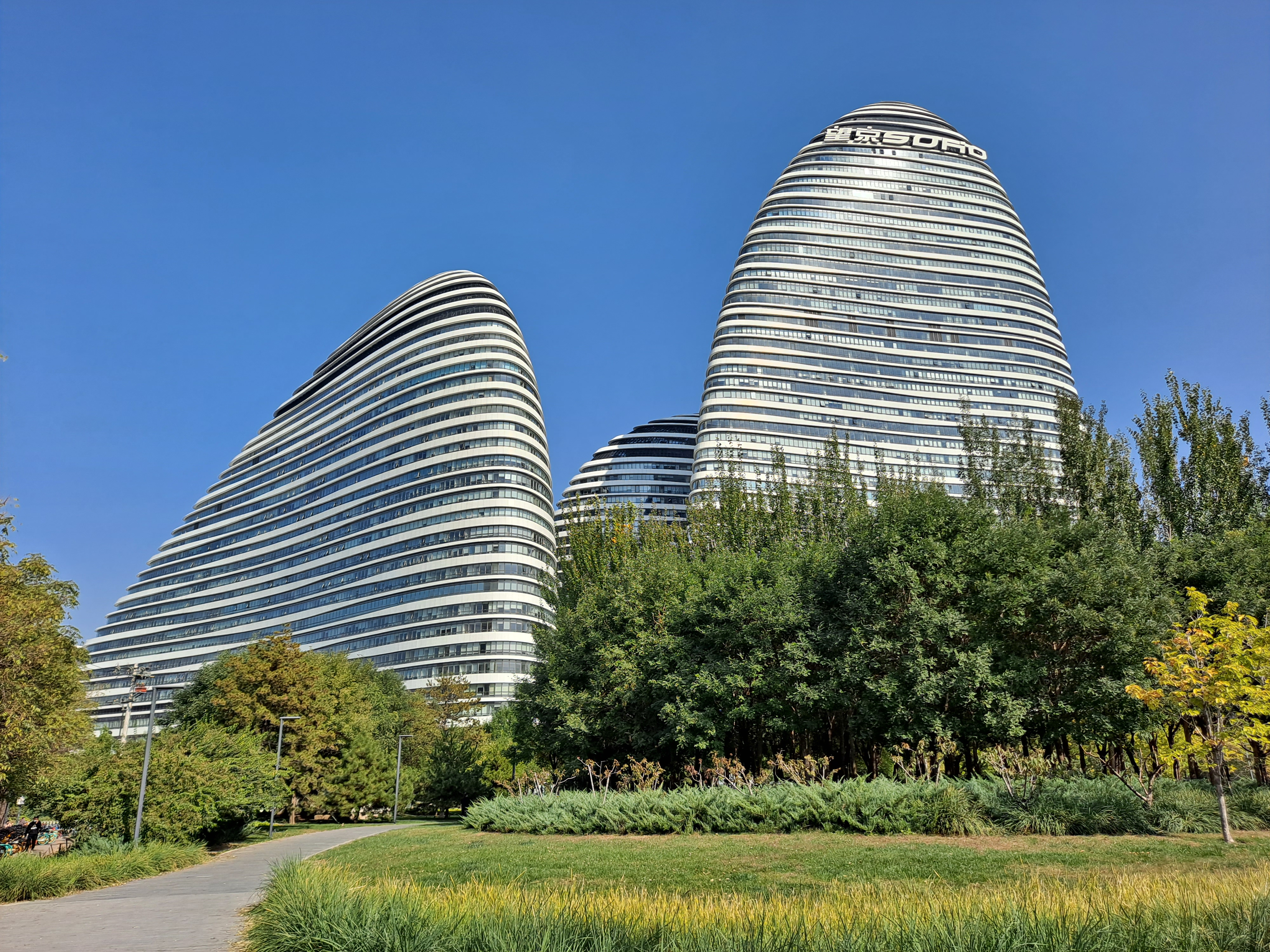
Wangjing SOHO

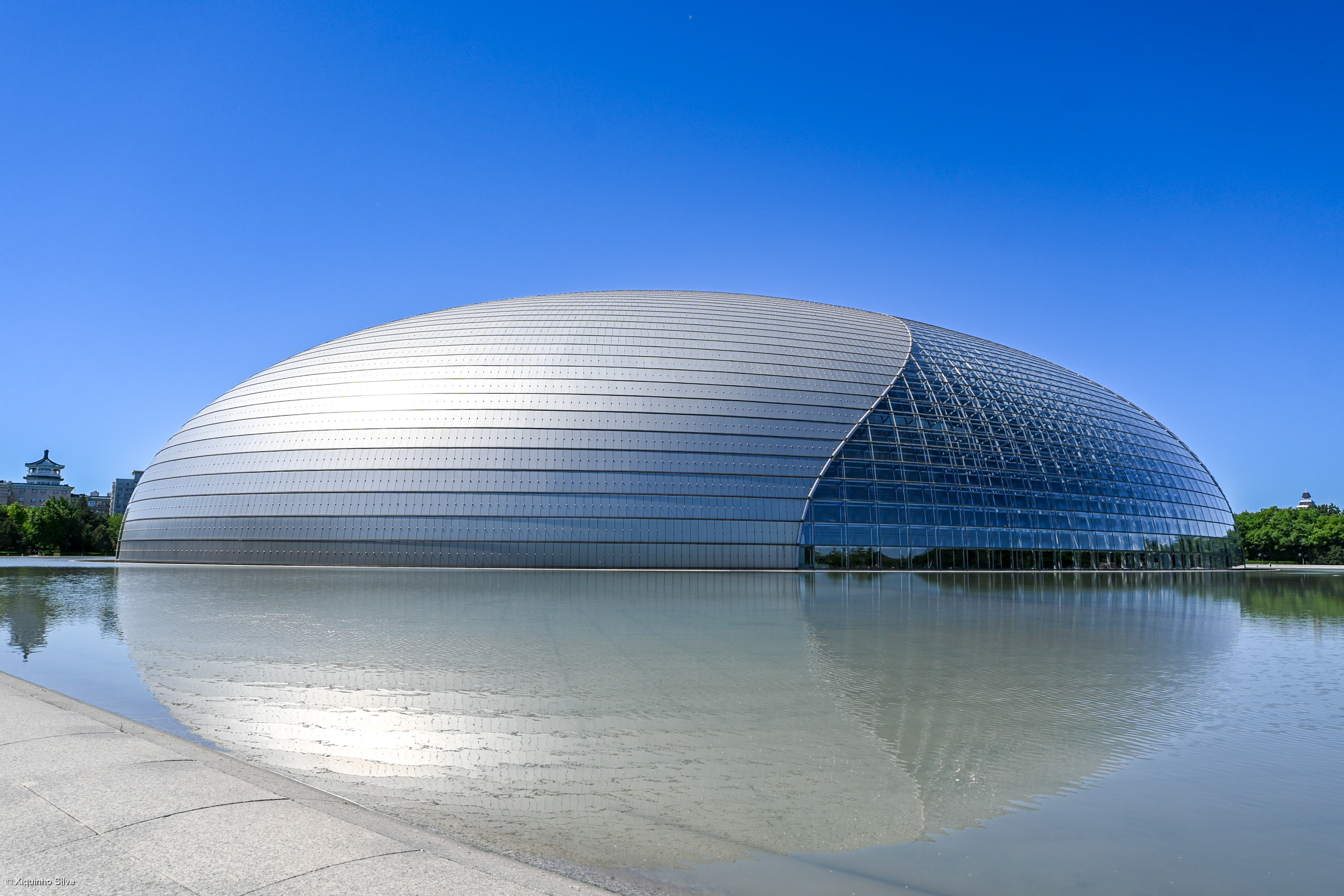
National Centre for the Performing Arts

Imperial Ancestral Temple

In the early 21st century, Beijing has witnessed tremendous growth of new building constructions, exhibiting various modern styles from international designers, most pronounced in the CBD region. A mixture of both 1950s design and neofuturistic style of architecture can be seen at the 798 Art Zone, which mixes the old with the new. Beijing's tallest building is the 528-meter China Zun. Since 2007, buildings in Beijing have received the CTBUH Skyscraper Award for best overall tall building twice, for the Linked Hybrid building in 2009 and the CCTV Headquarters in 2013. The CTBUH Skyscraper award for best tall overall building is given to only one building around the world every year.

Siheyuans in Beijing are courtyards surrounding by buildings. Among the more grand examples are the Prince Gong Mansion and Residence of Soong Ching-ling. These courtyards are usually connected by alleys called hutongs. The hutongs are generally straight and run east to west so that doorways face north and south for good Feng Shui. They vary in width; some are so narrow only a few pedestrians can pass through at a time. Once ubiquitous in Beijing, siheyuans and hutongs are rapidly disappearing, as entire city blocks of hutongs are replaced by high-rise buildings. Residents of the hutongs are entitled to live in the new buildings in apartments of at least the same size as their former residences. Many complain, however, that the traditional sense of community and street life of the hutongs cannot be replaced, and these properties are often government owned.

== Geography ==
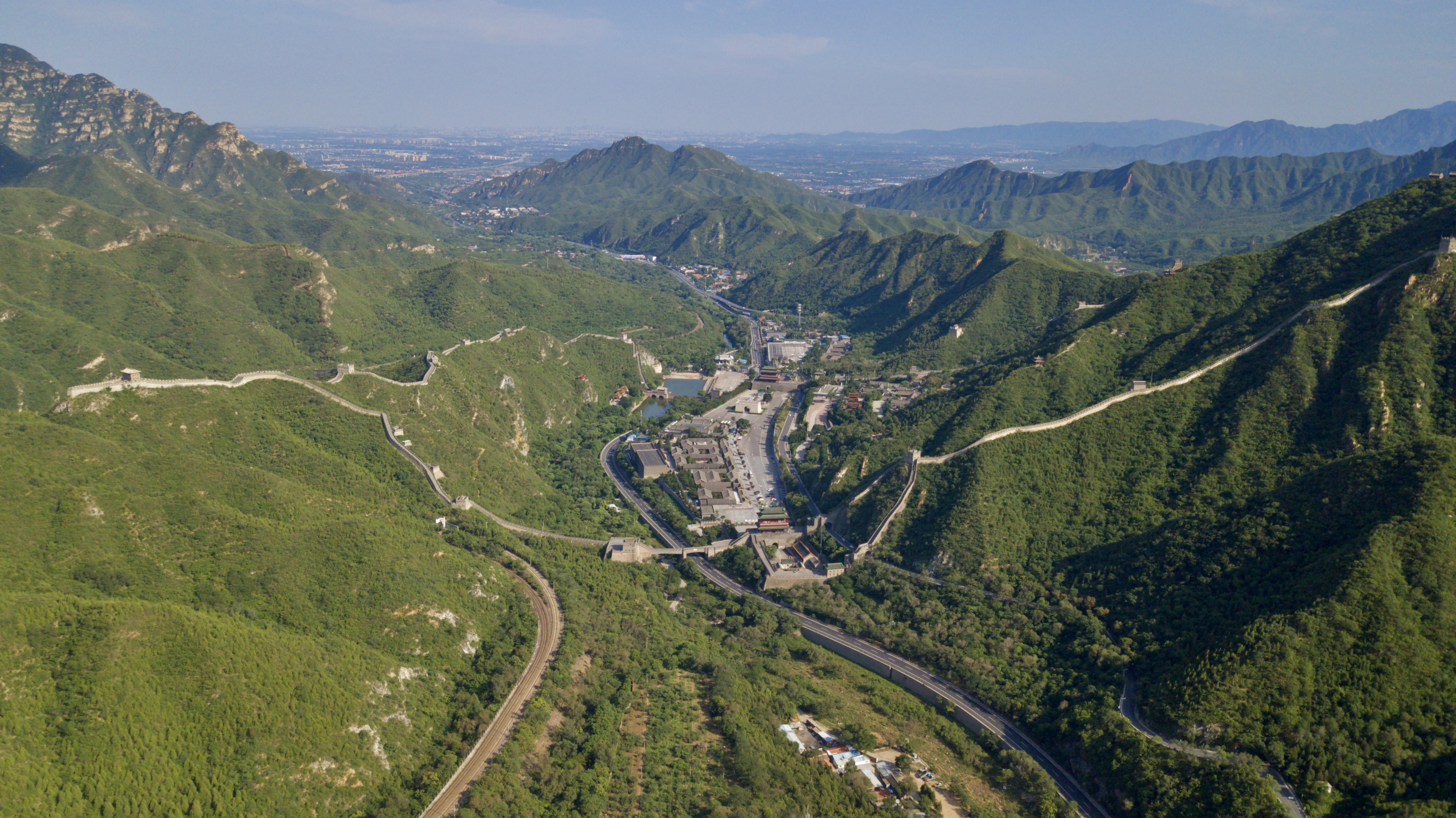
Juyong Pass, viewed from the north. The Beijing–Zhangjiakou Railway (1909) and G6 Expressway pass through this historic mountain gateway across the Great Wall north of Beijing.

Beijing is situated at the northern edge of the roughly triangular North China Plain, which opens to the south and east of the city. Mountains to the north, northwest and west shield the city and northern China's agricultural heartland from the encroaching desert steppes. The northwestern part of the municipality, especially Yanqing District and Huairou District, are dominated by the Jundu Mountains, while the western part is framed by Xishan or the Western Hills. The Great Wall of China across the northern part of Beijing Municipality was built on the rugged topography to defend against nomadic incursions from the steppes. Mount Dongling, in the Western Hills and on the border with Hebei, is the municipality's highest point, with an altitude of 2,303 metres (7,556 ft).

Major rivers flowing through the municipality, including the Chaobai, Yongding, Juma, are all tributaries in the Hai River system, and flow in a southeasterly direction. The Miyun Reservoir, on the upper reaches of the Chaobai River, is the largest reservoir within the municipality. Beijing is also the northern terminus of the Grand Canal to Hangzhou, which was built over 1,400 years ago as a transportation route, and the South–North Water Transfer Project, constructed in the past decade to bring water from the Yangtze River basin.

The urban area of Beijing, on the plains in the south-central of the municipality with elevation of 40 to 60 metres (130–200 feet), occupies a relatively small but expanding portion of the municipality's area. The city spreads out in concentric ring roads. The Second Ring Road traces the old city walls and the Sixth Ring Road connects satellite towns in the surrounding suburbs. Tian'anmen and Tian'anmen Square are at the center of Beijing, directly to the south of the Forbidden City, the former residence of the emperors of China. To the west of Tian'anmen is Zhongnanhai, the residence of China's current leaders. Chang'an Avenue, which cuts between Tiananmen and the Square, forms the city's main east–west axis.

Beijing's pattern of development from the old inner city to its urban fringe are frequently described as "spreading like a pancake" (tan da bing). This pattern of development is frequently cited as a reason for Beijing's urban problems.

=== Climate ===
Beijing has a humid continental climate (Köppen: Dwa), bordering on a monsoonal cold semi-arid climate (Köppen: BSk). The city is characterized by hot, humid summers due to the East Asian monsoon as well as brief but cold, dry winters that reflect the influence of the vast Siberian anticyclone. Spring can bear witness to sandstorms blowing in from the Gobi Desert across the Mongolian steppe, accompanied by rapidly warming, but generally dry, conditions. Autumn, similar to spring, is a season of transition and minimal precipitation. From 2001 to 2026, the hottest period in Beijing is early August, and the coldest period is early January. According to China's seasonal division standard, Beijing enters spring on 26 March, summer on 20 May, autumn on 13 September, and winter on 31 October. Due to the faster warming in March and September and the slower warming in May and October in recent years, Beijing is generally shorter in autumn than in spring. The average annual temperature (From 1991 to 2020) in the urban area of Beijing is 12.9 °C (55.2 °F) to 13.3 °C (55.9 °F), of which the average daily minimum temperature is 7.7 °C (45.9 °F) to 8.4 °C (47.1 °F), and the average daily maximum temperature is 18.5 °C (65.3 °F) to 18.9 °C (66.0 °F). The average annual temperature in the low-altitude part of the suburbs of Beijing is 11.5 °C (52.7 °F) to 13.0 °C (55.4 °F), of which the average daily minimum temperature is 5.9 °C (42.6 °F) to 8.0 °C (46.4 °F), and the average daily maximum temperature is 18.2 °C (64.8 °F) to 18.7 °C (65.7 °F). The average annual temperature in mountainous areas is between 0 °C (32 °F) and 10 °C (50 °F), decreasing as the altitude increases. The monthly daily average temperature in January is −2.7 °C (27.1 °F), while in July it is 27.2 °C (81.0 °F). Precipitation averages around 528.0 mm (20.79 in) annually (Haidian and Chaoyang has an average annual precipitation of 584.2 mm (23.00 in)), with close to three-quarters of that total falling from June to August. With monthly percent possible sunshine ranging from 42% in July to 62% in January and February, the city receives 2,490.5 hours of bright sunshine annually. Extremes since 1951 have ranged from −27.4 °C (−17.3 °F) on 22 February 1966 to 41.9 °C (107.4 °F) on 24 July 1999.

Climate data for Beijing, elevation 31 m (102 ft), (1991–2020 normals, extremes 1951–present)
Month	Jan	Feb	Mar	Apr	May	Jun	Jul	Aug	Sep	Oct	Nov	Dec	Year
Record high °C (°F)	14.3 (57.7)	25.6 (78.1)	29.5 (85.1)	33.5 (92.3)	41.1 (106.0)	41.1 (106.0)	41.9 (107.4)	38.3 (100.9)	35.9 (96.6)	31.0 (87.8)	23.3 (73.9)	19.5 (67.1)	41.9 (107.4)
Mean daily maximum °C (°F)	2.3 (36.1)	6.1 (43.0)	13.2 (55.8)	21.0 (69.8)	27.2 (81.0)	30.8 (87.4)	31.8 (89.2)	30.7 (87.3)	26.5 (79.7)	19.3 (66.7)	10.3 (50.5)	3.7 (38.7)	18.6 (65.4)
Daily mean °C (°F)	−2.7 (27.1)	0.6 (33.1)	7.5 (45.5)	15.1 (59.2)	21.3 (70.3)	25.3 (77.5)	27.2 (81.0)	26.1 (79.0)	21.2 (70.2)	13.8 (56.8)	5.2 (41.4)	−1.0 (30.2)	13.3 (55.9)
Mean daily minimum °C (°F)	−6.9 (19.6)	−4.2 (24.4)	1.9 (35.4)	9.0 (48.2)	15.1 (59.2)	20.0 (68.0)	23.0 (73.4)	22.0 (71.6)	16.3 (61.3)	8.8 (47.8)	0.7 (33.3)	−5.0 (23.0)	8.4 (47.1)
Record low °C (°F)	−22.8 (−9.0)	−27.4 (−17.3)	−15 (5)	−3.2 (26.2)	2.5 (36.5)	9.8 (49.6)	15.3 (59.5)	11.4 (52.5)	3.7 (38.7)	−3.5 (25.7)	−12.3 (9.9)	−18.3 (−0.9)	−27.4 (−17.3)
Average precipitation mm (inches)	2.2 (0.09)	5.8 (0.23)	8.6 (0.34)	21.7 (0.85)	36.1 (1.42)	72.4 (2.85)	169.7 (6.68)	113.4 (4.46)	53.7 (2.11)	28.7 (1.13)	13.5 (0.53)	2.2 (0.09)	528 (20.78)
Average precipitation days (≥ 0.1 mm)	1.6	2.3	3.0	4.7	6.0	10.0	11.9	10.5	7.1	5.2	2.9	1.6	66.8
Average snowy days	2.8	2.5	1.3	0.1	0.0	0.0	0.0	0.0	0.0	0.0	1.7	2.8	11.2
Average relative humidity (%)	43	42	40	43	47	58	69	71	64	58	54	46	53
Mean monthly sunshine hours	188.1	189.1	231.1	243.2	265.1	221.6	190.5	205.3	206.1	199.9	173.4	177.1	2,490.5
Percentage possible sunshine	62	62	62	61	59	50	42	49	56	59	59	61	57
Average ultraviolet index	2	3	4	6	8	9	9	8	6	4	2	1	5
Source 1: China Meteorological Administration
Source 2: Extremes (Note: All-time record high; February record high; May record high; June record high) and Weather Atlas

==== Note ====
Climate data for Beijing (Haidian District), elevation 46 m (151 ft), (1991–2020 normals, extremes 1961–present)
Month	Jan	Feb	Mar	Apr	May	Jun	Jul	Aug	Sep	Oct	Nov	Dec	Year
Record high °C (°F)	14.7 (58.5)	26.7 (80.1)	30.1 (86.2)	34.2 (93.6)	41.2 (106.2)	40.2 (104.4)	41.7 (107.1)	39.1 (102.4)	37.9 (100.2)	31.0 (87.8)	23.2 (73.8)	19.6 (67.3)	41.7 (107.1)
Mean daily maximum °C (°F)	2.7 (36.9)	6.5 (43.7)	13.4 (56.1)	21.3 (70.3)	27.6 (81.7)	31.0 (87.8)	32.0 (89.6)	31.2 (88.2)	26.8 (80.2)	19.5 (67.1)	10.6 (51.1)	4.0 (39.2)	18.9 (66.0)
Daily mean °C (°F)	−2.7 (27.1)	0.6 (33.1)	7.4 (45.3)	15.1 (59.2)	21.2 (70.2)	25.1 (77.2)	26.9 (80.4)	25.9 (78.6)	20.8 (69.4)	13.3 (55.9)	4.9 (40.8)	−1.1 (30.0)	13.1 (55.6)
Mean daily minimum °C (°F)	−7.1 (19.2)	−4.3 (24.3)	1.8 (35.2)	8.8 (47.8)	14.8 (58.6)	19.7 (67.5)	22.6 (72.7)	21.6 (70.9)	15.9 (60.6)	8.3 (46.9)	0.3 (32.5)	−5.2 (22.6)	8.1 (46.6)
Record low °C (°F)	−20.2 (−4.4)	−19.5 (−3.1)	−10.7 (12.7)	−4.5 (23.9)	3.4 (38.1)	9.6 (49.3)	15.8 (60.4)	13.9 (57.0)	4.0 (39.2)	−3.6 (25.5)	−12.7 (9.1)	−18.9 (−2.0)	−20.2 (−4.4)
Average precipitation mm (inches)	2.1 (0.08)	5.6 (0.22)	9.6 (0.38)	21.6 (0.85)	34.7 (1.37)	84.8 (3.34)	209.5 (8.25)	119.7 (4.71)	53.3 (2.10)	27.8 (1.09)	15.1 (0.59)	2.5 (0.10)	586.3 (23.08)
Average precipitation days (≥ 0.1 mm)	1.3	2.3	2.8	4.5	6.1	10.3	13.1	11.0	7.5	5.0	3.0	1.5	68.4
Average snowy days	2.4	2.2	1.1	0.1	0	0	0	0	0	0	1.5	2.4	9.7
Average relative humidity (%)	43	42	41	43	48	60	72	73	67	62	56	46	54
Mean monthly sunshine hours	183.1	183.6	220.2	233.1	250.5	203.2	170.2	186.9	194.8	188.8	166.0	169.9	2,350.3
Percentage possible sunshine	61	60	59	58	56	45	38	44	53	55	56	59	54
Source: China Meteorological Administration

Climate data for Beijing (Chaoyang District), elevation 35 m (115 ft), (1991–2020 normals, extremes 1961–present)
Month	Jan	Feb	Mar	Apr	May	Jun	Jul	Aug	Sep	Oct	Nov	Dec	Year
Record high °C (°F)	14.7 (58.5)	25.7 (78.3)	29.2 (84.6)	34.5 (94.1)	41.1 (106.0)	41.6 (106.9)	41.0 (105.8)	37.7 (99.9)	36.4 (97.5)	30.8 (87.4)	22.5 (72.5)	18.7 (65.7)	41.6 (106.9)
Mean daily maximum °C (°F)	2.3 (36.1)	6.2 (43.2)	13.2 (55.8)	21.1 (70.0)	27.2 (81.0)	30.7 (87.3)	31.7 (89.1)	30.7 (87.3)	26.4 (79.5)	19.3 (66.7)	10.3 (50.5)	3.7 (38.7)	18.6 (65.4)
Daily mean °C (°F)	−3.0 (26.6)	0.3 (32.5)	7.3 (45.1)	15.0 (59.0)	21.1 (70.0)	24.9 (76.8)	26.8 (80.2)	25.7 (78.3)	20.6 (69.1)	13.2 (55.8)	4.7 (40.5)	−1.3 (29.7)	12.9 (55.3)
Mean daily minimum °C (°F)	−7.5 (18.5)	−4.8 (23.4)	1.2 (34.2)	8.3 (46.9)	14.3 (57.7)	19.2 (66.6)	22.4 (72.3)	21.3 (70.3)	15.5 (59.9)	7.7 (45.9)	−0.2 (31.6)	−5.6 (21.9)	7.7 (45.8)
Record low °C (°F)	−19.4 (−2.9)	−21.2 (−6.2)	−13.9 (7.0)	−3.8 (25.2)	2.7 (36.9)	9.3 (48.7)	14.2 (57.6)	13.3 (55.9)	4.3 (39.7)	−4.9 (23.2)	−13.2 (8.2)	−17.8 (0.0)	−21.2 (−6.2)
Average precipitation mm (inches)	2.3 (0.09)	5.3 (0.21)	8.1 (0.32)	22.1 (0.87)	36.4 (1.43)	80.8 (3.18)	183.9 (7.24)	138.6 (5.46)	59.5 (2.34)	29.3 (1.15)	13.8 (0.54)	1.9 (0.07)	582.0 (22.91)
Average precipitation days (≥ 0.1 mm)	1.5	2.3	2.8	4.7	5.9	10.1	12.8	10.5	7.3	4.9	2.9	1.7	67.4
Average snowy days	2.7	2.3	1.1	0.2	0	0	0	0	0	0	1.7	2.6	10.6
Average relative humidity (%)	43	42	41	43	49	60	72	73	68	63	57	47	55
Mean monthly sunshine hours	179.1	179.8	222.4	237.6	263.5	219.7	181.5	193.6	201.1	193.3	159.0	164.6	2,395.2
Percentage possible sunshine	60	59	60	59	59	49	40	46	54	57	54	57	55
Source: China Meteorological Administration

Climate data for Miyun District, elevation 72 m (236 ft), (1991–2020 normals, extremes 1981–present)
Month	Jan	Feb	Mar	Apr	May	Jun	Jul	Aug	Sep	Oct	Nov	Dec	Year
Record high °C (°F)	13.9 (57.0)	19.2 (66.6)	29.3 (84.7)	31.5 (88.7)	37.2 (99.0)	39.8 (103.6)	40.8 (105.4)	38.1 (100.6)	34.7 (94.5)	30.8 (87.4)	22.8 (73.0)	13.2 (55.8)	40.8 (105.4)
Mean daily maximum °C (°F)	1.8 (35.2)	5.8 (42.4)	12.8 (55.0)	20.8 (69.4)	26.9 (80.4)	30.5 (86.9)	31.4 (88.5)	30.4 (86.7)	26.1 (79.0)	19.1 (66.4)	10.0 (50.0)	3.1 (37.6)	18.2 (64.8)
Daily mean °C (°F)	−5.5 (22.1)	−1.7 (28.9)	5.6 (42.1)	13.9 (57.0)	20.0 (68.0)	24.2 (75.6)	26.2 (79.2)	24.9 (76.8)	19.5 (67.1)	11.8 (53.2)	3.0 (37.4)	−3.7 (25.3)	11.5 (52.7)
Mean daily minimum °C (°F)	−10.8 (12.6)	−7.6 (18.3)	−1.1 (30.0)	6.6 (43.9)	12.7 (54.9)	18.2 (64.8)	21.7 (71.1)	20.5 (68.9)	14.3 (57.7)	6.2 (43.2)	−2.3 (27.9)	−8.7 (16.3)	5.8 (42.5)
Record low °C (°F)	−23.3 (−9.9)	−21.0 (−5.8)	−13.3 (8.1)	−5.0 (23.0)	0.5 (32.9)	8.2 (46.8)	13.7 (56.7)	11.5 (52.7)	2.0 (35.6)	−5.6 (21.9)	−14.6 (5.7)	−19.0 (−2.2)	−23.3 (−9.9)
Average precipitation mm (inches)	2.0 (0.08)	4.2 (0.17)	7.7 (0.30)	20.9 (0.82)	44.3 (1.74)	83.8 (3.30)	196.9 (7.75)	151.0 (5.94)	64.5 (2.54)	30.3 (1.19)	13.4 (0.53)	2.7 (0.11)	621.7 (24.47)
Average precipitation days (≥ 0.1 mm)	1.3	1.9	3.0	4.6	6.8	10.7	13.8	10.9	7.7	5.4	2.9	1.8	70.8
Average snowy days	2.8	2.5	1.7	0.2	0	0	0	0	0	0	2.2	2.8	12.2
Average relative humidity (%)	47	45	44	46	53	63	74	77	72	66	60	53	58
Mean monthly sunshine hours	182.1	180.4	214.4	223.1	246.1	201.1	172.1	191.5	192.1	189.2	162.4	166.5	2,321
Percentage possible sunshine	61	59	57	56	55	45	38	45	52	56	55	58	53
Source: China Meteorological Administration

Climate data for Pinggu District, elevation 32 m (105 ft), (1991–2020 normals, extremes 1959–present)
Month	Jan	Feb	Mar	Apr	May	Jun	Jul	Aug	Sep	Oct	Nov	Dec	Year
Record high °C (°F)	13.8 (56.8)	24.3 (75.7)	28.7 (83.7)	33.7 (92.7)	36.9 (98.4)	39.3 (102.7)	41.3 (106.3)	37.3 (99.1)	36.8 (98.2)	30.7 (87.3)	22.3 (72.1)	14.5 (58.1)	41.3 (106.3)
Mean daily maximum °C (°F)	2.0 (35.6)	5.9 (42.6)	12.8 (55.0)	20.7 (69.3)	26.9 (80.4)	30.5 (86.9)	31.5 (88.7)	30.4 (86.7)	26.2 (79.2)	19.2 (66.6)	10.1 (50.2)	3.2 (37.8)	18.3 (64.9)
Daily mean °C (°F)	−4.9 (23.2)	−1.2 (29.8)	6.1 (43.0)	14.3 (57.7)	20.4 (68.7)	24.6 (76.3)	26.5 (79.7)	25.2 (77.4)	19.8 (67.6)	12.3 (54.1)	3.5 (38.3)	−3.2 (26.2)	12.0 (53.5)
Mean daily minimum °C (°F)	−10.3 (13.5)	−7.1 (19.2)	−0.1 (31.8)	7.5 (45.5)	13.5 (56.3)	18.8 (65.8)	22.0 (71.6)	20.7 (69.3)	14.5 (58.1)	6.5 (43.7)	−1.7 (28.9)	−8.1 (17.4)	6.4 (43.4)
Record low °C (°F)	−22.2 (−8.0)	−26.6 (−15.9)	−17.2 (1.0)	−5.5 (22.1)	0.2 (32.4)	7.7 (45.9)	13.9 (57.0)	8.0 (46.4)	3.0 (37.4)	−5.0 (23.0)	−14.9 (5.2)	−22.3 (−8.1)	−26.6 (−15.9)
Average precipitation mm (inches)	2.1 (0.08)	4.5 (0.18)	7.9 (0.31)	23.0 (0.91)	42.8 (1.69)	92.8 (3.65)	194.6 (7.66)	128.5 (5.06)	59.4 (2.34)	29.8 (1.17)	15.0 (0.59)	2.8 (0.11)	603.2 (23.75)
Average precipitation days (≥ 0.1 mm)	1.4	1.9	2.7	4.5	6.4	10.1	13.1	10.2	7.1	4.9	3.2	1.8	67.3
Average snowy days	3.0	2.6	1.2	0.1	0	0	0	0	0	0	1.7	2.9	11.5
Average relative humidity (%)	49	46	45	46	53	62	74	77	73	67	61	54	59
Mean monthly sunshine hours	183.2	182.5	224.4	235.2	260.6	220.9	183.8	205.0	207.2	194.9	168.4	174.7	2,440.8
Percentage possible sunshine	61	60	60	59	58	49	41	49	56	57	57	61	56
Source: China Meteorological Administration

Climate data for Beijing Capital International Airport (January 2013~June 2026 normals)
Month	Jan	Feb	Mar	Apr	May	Jun	Jul	Aug	Sep	Oct	Nov	Dec	Year
Mean daily maximum °C (°F)	3.3 (37.9)	6.6 (43.9)	15.2 (59.4)	22.2 (72.0)	27.9 (82.2)	31.7 (89.1)	32.4 (90.3)	31.5 (88.7)	27.5 (81.5)	19.4 (66.9)	11.3 (52.3)	4.7 (40.5)	19.5 (67.1)
Daily mean °C (°F)	−3.2 (26.2)	0.0 (32.0)	8.4 (47.1)	15.2 (59.4)	21.0 (69.8)	25.4 (77.7)	27.2 (81.0)	26.2 (79.2)	21.6 (70.9)	12.7 (54.9)	5.0 (41.0)	−2.0 (28.4)	13.1 (55.6)
Mean daily minimum °C (°F)	−8.8 (16.2)	−6.3 (20.7)	1.3 (34.3)	7.4 (45.3)	13.0 (55.4)	18.4 (65.1)	22.2 (72.0)	21.1 (70.0)	15.6 (60.1)	7.0 (44.6)	−0.2 (31.6)	−7.4 (18.7)	6.9 (44.5)
Average relative humidity (%)	45	43	42	44	50	57	72	73	69	65	56	47	55

Climate data for Beijing, elevation 31 m (102 ft), (August 2025 ~ July 2026)
Month	Jan	Feb	Mar	Apr	May	Jun	Jul	Aug	Sep	Oct	Nov	Dec	Year
Mean daily maximum °C (°F)	3.2 (37.8)	9.9 (49.8)	14.5 (58.1)	21.9 (71.4)	27.3 (81.1)	29.6 (85.3)	32.4 (90.3)	31.2 (88.2)	28.1 (82.6)	17.2 (63.0)	13.5 (56.3)	5.2 (41.4)	19.5 (67.1)
Daily mean °C (°F)	−3.0 (26.6)	2.5 (36.5)	8.9 (48.0)	15.9 (60.6)	21.8 (71.2)	24.1 (75.4)	28.0 (82.4)	26.6 (79.9)	22.4 (72.3)	12.5 (54.5)	6.8 (44.2)	−0.2 (31.6)	13.9 (56.9)
Mean daily minimum °C (°F)	−7.6 (18.3)	−3.4 (25.9)	3.1 (37.6)	9.6 (49.3)	15.9 (60.6)	18.3 (64.9)	24.0 (75.2)	22.8 (73.0)	17.4 (63.3)	8.6 (47.5)	1.6 (34.9)	−4.6 (23.7)	8.8 (47.9)
Average precipitation mm (inches)	0.3 (0.01)	1.6 (0.06)	4.7 (0.19)	29.5 (1.16)	118.1 (4.65)	115.6 (4.55)	182.1 (7.17)	292.3 (11.51)	58.5 (2.30)	119.1 (4.69)	5.5 (0.22)	3.9 (0.15)	931.2 (36.66)
Source: China Meteorological Administration

=== Environmental issues ===
Beijing had a long history of environmental problems. Between 2000 and 2009 Beijing's urban extent quadrupled, which not only strongly increased the extent of anthropogenic emissions, but also changed the meteorological situation fundamentally, even if emissions of human society are not included. For example, surface albedo, wind speed and humidity near the surface were decreased, whereas ground and near-surface air temperatures, vertical air dilution and ozone levels were increased. Because of the combined factors of urbanization and pollution caused by burning of fossil fuel, Beijing is often affected by serious environmental problems, which lead to health issues of many inhabitants. In 2013 heavy smog struck Beijing and most parts of northern China, impacting a total of 600 million people. After this "pollution shock" air pollution became an important economic and social concern in China. After that the government of Beijing announced measures to reduce air pollution, for example by lowering the share of coal from 24% in 2012 to 10% in 2017, while the national government ordered heavily polluting vehicles to be removed from 2015 to 2017 and increased its efforts to transition the energy system to clean sources.

==== Air quality ====
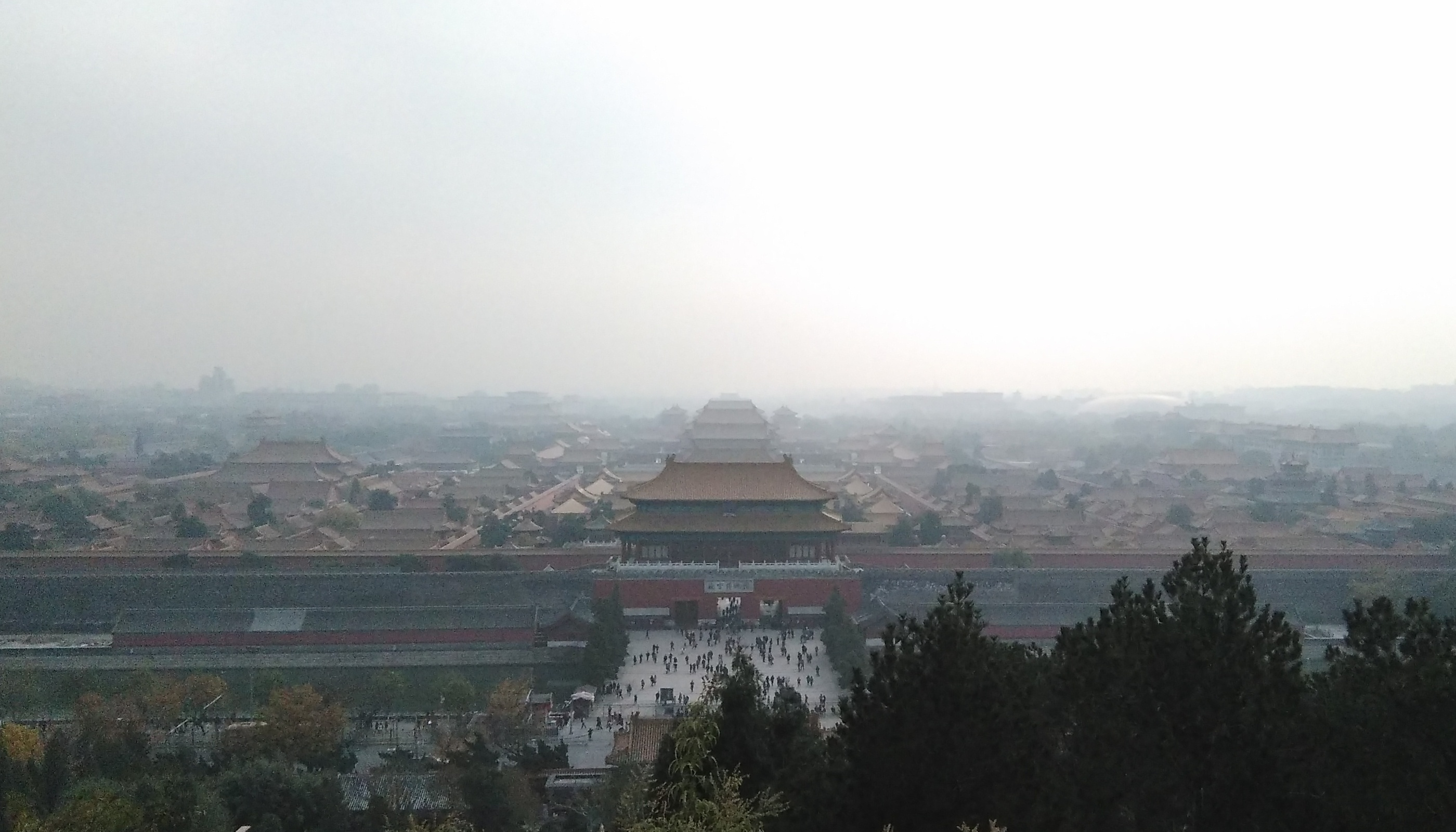
A view of the Forbidden City from the Jingshan Park during heavy smog in November 2016

Joint research between American and Chinese researchers in 2006 concluded that much of the city's pollution comes from surrounding cities and provinces. On average 35–60% of the ozone can be traced to sources outside the city. Shandong Province and Tianjin Municipality have a "significant influence on Beijing's air quality", partly due to the prevailing south/southeasterly flow during the summer and the mountains to the north and northwest.

In preparation for the 2008 Summer Olympics and to fulfill promises to clean up the city's air, nearly US$17 billion was spent. Beijing implemented a number of air improvement schemes for the duration of the Games, including halting work at all construction sites, closing many factories in Beijing permanently, temporarily shutting industry in neighboring regions, closing some gas stations, and cutting motor traffic by half by limiting drivers to odd or even days (based on their license plate numbers), reducing bus and subway fares, opening new subway lines, and banning high-emission vehicles. The city further assembled 3,800 natural gas-powered buses, one of the largest fleets in the world. Beijing became the first city in China to require the Chinese equivalent to the Euro 4 emission standard.

Coal burning accounts for about 40% of the PM 2.5 in Beijing and is also the chief source of nitrogen and sulphur dioxide. Since 2012, the city has been converting coal-fired power stations to burn natural gas and aims to cap annual coal consumption at 20 million tons. In 2011, the city burned 26.3 million tons of coal, 73% of which for heating and power generation and the remainder for industry. Much of the city's air pollutants are emitted by neighboring regions. Coal consumption in neighboring Tianjin is expected to increase from 48 to 63 million tons from 2011 to 2015. Hebei Province burned over 300 million tons of coal in 2011, more than all of Germany, of which only 30% were used for power generation and a considerable portion for steel and cement making. Power plants in the coal-mining regions of Shanxi, Inner Mongolia and Shaanxi, where coal consumption has tripled since 2000, and Shandong also contribute to air pollution in Beijing. Shandong, Shanxi, Hebei and Inner Mongolia, respectively rank from first to fourth, among Chinese provinces by coal consumption. There were four major coal-fired power plants in the city to provide electricity as well as heating during the winter. The first one (Gaojing Thermal Power Plant) was shut down in 2014. Another two were shut in March 2015. The last one (Huaneng Thermal Power Plant) would be shut in 2016. Between 2013 and 2017, the city planned to reduce 13 million tons of coal consumption and cap coal consumption to 15 million tons in 2015.

The government sometimes uses cloud-seeding measures to increase the likelihood of rain showers in the region to clear the air prior to large events, such as prior to the 60th anniversary parade in 2009 as well as to combat drought conditions in the area. More recently, however, the government has increased its usage of such measures as closing factories temporarily and implementing greater restrictions for cars on the road, as in the case of "APEC blue" and "parade blue", short periods during and immediately preceding the APEC China 2014 and the 2015 China Victory Day Parade, respectively. During and prior to these events, Beijing's air quality improved dramatically, only to fall back to unhealthy levels shortly after.

On 8 and 9 December 2015 Beijing had its first smog alert which shut down a majority of the industry and other commercial businesses in the city. Later in the month another smog "red alert" was issued.

According to Beijing's environmental protection bureau's announcement in November 2016, starting from 2017 highly polluting old cars will be banned from being driven whenever Smog "red alerts" are issued in the city or neighboring regions.

In recent years, there has been measurable reductions in pollutants after the "war on pollution" was declared in 2014, with Beijing seeing a 35% reduction in fine particulates in 2017 and further reduction by 2020. The primary factors behind this reduction were replacing coal power with natural gas and cleaning up polluting industrial facilities in the Beijing area.

Beijing's annual average concentration of major airborne fine particulate matter, or PM2.5, declined to 30 micrograms per cubic meter in 2022, the best air quality for the city since 2013. In 2024, Beijing experienced only two days of heavy pollution, the lowest number on record, which had decreased by 96.6 percent from 58 days in 2013.

===== Readings =====
Due to Beijing's high level of air pollution, there are various readings by different sources on the subject. Daily pollution readings at 27 monitoring stations around the city are reported on the website of the Beijing Environmental Protection Bureau (BJEPB). The American Embassy of Beijing also reports hourly fine particulate (PM2.5) and ozone levels on Twitter. Since the BJEPB and US Embassy measure different pollutants according to different criteria, the pollution levels and the impact to human health reported by the BJEPB are often lower than that reported by the US Embassy.

The smog is causing harm and danger to the population. The air pollution does directly result in significant impact on the morbidity rate of cardiovascular disease and respiratory disease in Beijing. Exposure to large concentrations of polluted air can cause respiratory and cardiovascular problems, emergency room visits, and even death.

==== Dust storms ====
Dust from the erosion of deserts in northern and northwestern China results in seasonal dust storms that plague the city; the Beijing Weather Modification Office sometimes artificially induces rainfall to fight such storms and mitigate their effects. In the first four months of 2006 alone, there were no fewer than eight such storms. In April 2002, one dust storm alone dumped nearly 50,000 tons of dust onto the city before moving on to Japan and Korea.

== Government ==
The municipal government is regulated by the Municipal Committee of the Chinese Communist Party (CCP), led by the Beijing CCP Secretary. The Municipal CCP Committee issues administrative orders, collects taxes, manages the economy, and directs a standing committee of the Municipal People's Congress in making policy decisions and overseeing the local government. Since 1987, all CCP Secretary of Beijing is also a member of the Politburo.

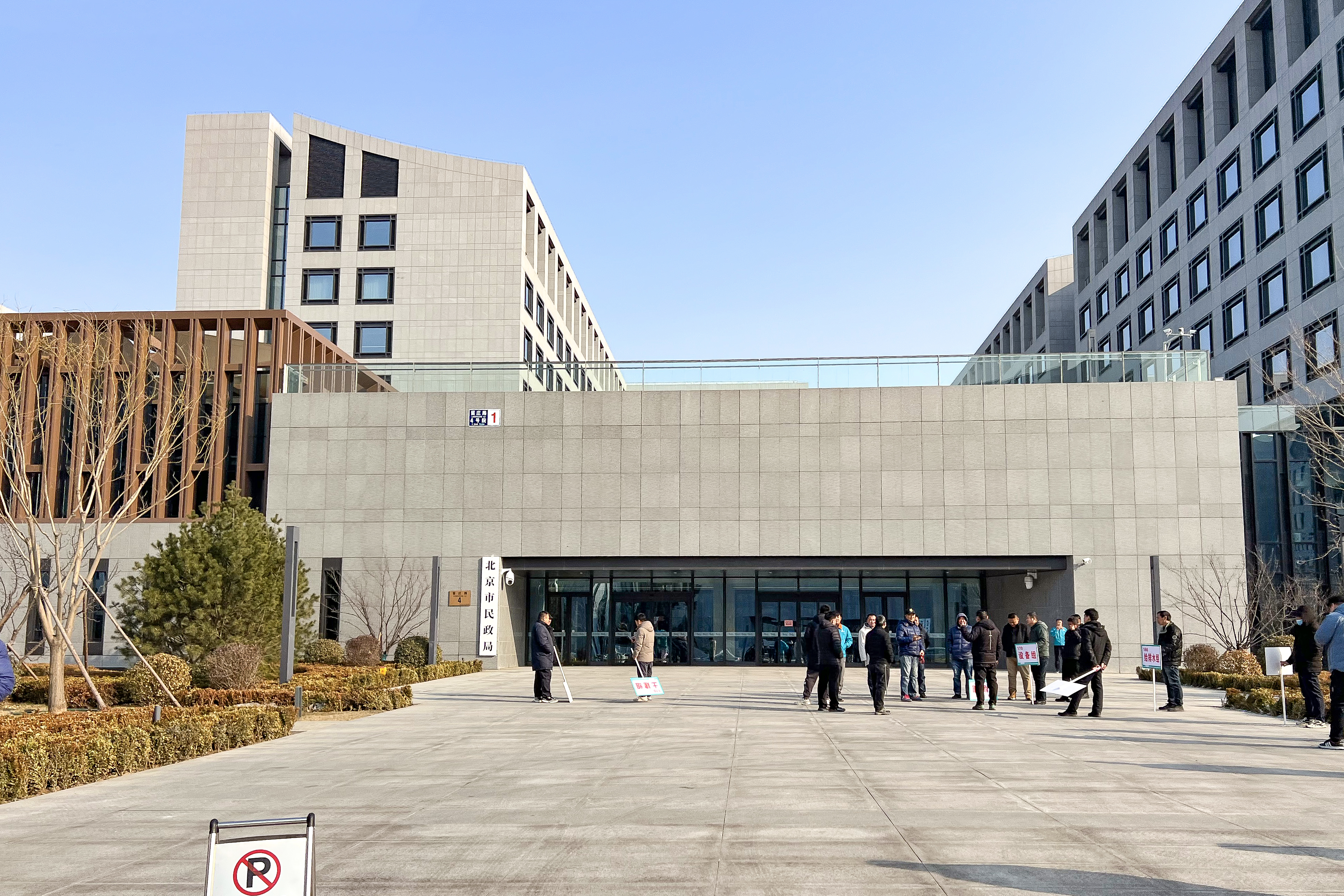
Beijing Municipal Civil Affairs Bureau

Government officials include the mayor (Chinese: 市长) and vice-mayor. Numerous bureaus focus on law, public security, and other affairs. Additionally, as the capital of China, Beijing houses all of the important national governmental and political institutions, including the National People's Congress.

=== Administrative divisions ===
Beijing Municipality currently comprises 16 administrative county-level subdivisions, namely 16 urban districts. On 1 July 2010, Chongwen and Xuanwu were merged into Dongcheng and Xicheng, respectively. On 13 November 2015 Miyun and Yanqing were upgraded to districts.

Administrative divisions of Beijing

1. Xicheng District • 2. Dongcheng District • 3. Shijingshan District

Division	Area in km^{2}	Total population 2020	Urban area population 2020	Seat	Postal code	Subdivisions
Division	Area in km^{2}	Total population 2020	Urban area population 2020	Seat	Postal code	Subdistricts	Towns	Townships (Note: Including Ethnic townships & other township related subdivisions.)	Residential communities	Villages
110000	Beijing	16406.16	21,893,095	19,166,433	Dongcheng / Tongzhou	100000	149	143	38	2538	3857
110101	Dongcheng	41.82	708,829		Jingshan Subdistrict	100000	17			216
110102	Xicheng	50.33	1,106,214		Jinrong Street Subdistrict	100000	15			259
110105	Chaoyang	454.78	3,452,460		Chaowai Subdistrict	100000	24		19	358	5
110106	Fengtai	305.53	2,019,764	2,003,652	Fengtai Subdistrict	100000	16	2	3	254	73
110107	Shijingshan	84.38	567,851		Lugu Subdistrict	100000	9			130
110108	Haidian	430.77	3,133,469	3,058,731	Haidian Subdistrict	100000	22	7		603	84
110109	Mentougou	1447.85	392,606	358,945	Dayu Subdistrict	102300	4	9		124	179
110111	Fangshan	1994.73	1,312,778	1,025,320	Gongchen Subdistrict	102400	8	14	6	108	462
110112	Tongzhou	905.79	1,840,295	1,361,403	Beiyuan Subdistrict	101100	6	10	1	40	480
110113	Shunyi	1019.51	1,324,044	875,261	Shengli Subdistrict	101300	6	19		61	449
110114	Changping	1342.47	2,269,487	1,856,115	Chengbei Subdistrict	102200	8	14		180	303
110115	Daxing	1036.34	1,993,591	1,622,382	Xingfeng Subdistrict	102600	5	14		64	547
110116	Huairou	2122.82	441,040	334,682	Longshan Subdistrict	101400	2	12	2	27	286
110117	Pinggu	948.24	457,313	278,501	Binhe Subdistrict	101200	2	14	2	23	275
110118	Miyun	2225.92	527,683	350,398	Gulou Subdistrict	101500	2	17	1	57	338
110119	Yanqing	1994.89	345,671	205,689	Rulin Subdistrict	102100	3	11	4	34	376

Divisions in Chinese
English	Chinese	Pinyin
Beijing Municipality	北京市	Běijīng Shì
Dongcheng District	东城区	Dōngchéng Qū
Xicheng District	西城区	Xīchéng Qū
Chaoyang District	朝阳区	Cháoyáng Qū
Fengtai District	丰台区	Fēngtái Qū
Shijingshan District	石景山区	Shíjǐngshān Qū
Haidian District	海淀区	Hǎidiàn Qū
Mentougou District	门头沟区	Méntóugōu Qū
Fangshan District	房山区	Fángshān Qū
Tongzhou District	通州区	Tōngzhōu Qū
Shunyi District	顺义区	Shùnyì Qū
Changping District	昌平区	Chāngpíng Qū
Daxing District	大兴区	Dàxīng Qū
Huairou District	怀柔区	Huáiróu Qū
Pinggu District	平谷区	Pínggǔ Qū
Miyun District	密云区	Mìyún Qū
Yanqing District	延庆区	Yánqìng Qū

==== Towns ====
Beijing's 16 county-level divisions (districts) are further subdivided into 273 lower third-level administrative units at the township level: 119 towns, 24 townships, 5 ethnic townships and 125 subdistricts. Towns within Beijing Municipality but outside the urban area include (but are not limited to):

- Changping 昌平
- Huairou 怀柔
- Miyun 密云
- Liangxiang 良乡
- Liulimiao 琉璃庙
- Tongzhou 通州
- Yizhuang 亦庄
- Tiantongyuan 天通苑
- Beiyuan 北苑
- Xiaotangshan 小汤山

Several place names in Beijing end with mén (门), meaning "gate", as they were the locations of gates in the former Beijing city wall. Other place names end in cūn (村), meaning "village", as they were originally villages outside the city wall.

=== Judiciary and procuracy ===
The judicial system in Beijing consists of the Supreme People's Court, the highest court in the country, the Beijing Municipal High People's Court, the high people's court of the municipality, three intermediate people's courts, one intermediate railway transport court, 14 basic people's court (one for each of the municipality's districts and counties), one basic railway transport court, and one Internet court. The Beijing No. 1 Intermediate People's Court in Shijingshan oversees the basic courts of Haidian, Shijingshan, Mentougou, Changping and Yanqing. The Beijing No. 2 Intermediate People's Court in Fengtai oversees the basic courts of Dongcheng, Xicheng, Fengtai, Fangshan and Daxing. The Beijing No. 3 Intermediate People's Court in Laiguangying, is the newest of the three intermediate people's courts and opened on 21 August 2013. It oversees the district courts of Chaoyang, Tongzhou, Shunyi, Huairou, Pinggu and Miyun. Each court in Beijing has a corresponding people's procuratorate.

In 2016, Beijing began a pilot program to expand legal aid eligibility to civil plaintiffs in labor disputes, housing disputes, and various other matters; this approach became the model for China's Legal Aid Law.

== Economy ==
As of 2025, Beijing's GDP was CN¥5.2 trillion ($748 billion in nominal, $1.52 trillion in PPP), about 3.71% of the country's GDP and ranked 12th among province-level administrative units; its GDP per capita was CN¥238,571 (US$34,252 in norminal; US$69,962 in PPP) and ranked the 1st in the country. It also ranks the tenth largest in the metropolitan economies in the world.

Due to the concentration of state owned enterprises in the national capital, Beijing in 2013 had more Fortune Global 500 Company headquarters than any other city in the world. As of August 2022, Beijing has 54 Fortune Global 500 companies, more than Japan (47), the third-place country after China (145) and the United States (124). Beijing has also been described as the "billionaire capital of the world". Beijing is classified as an Alpha+ (global first-tier) city by the Globalization and World Cities Research Network, indicating its influence in the region and worldwide and making it one of the world's Top 10 major cities. In the 2021 Global Financial Centres Index, Beijing was ranked as having the sixth-most competitive financial center in the world and fourth-most competitive in the whole Asia & Oceania region (behind Shanghai, Hong Kong and Singapore).

As of 2021, Beijing was ranked first globally in terms of "Global City Competitiveness" in the 2020–2021 Global Urban Competitiveness Report jointly released by the Chinese Academy of Social Sciences (CASS) and the United Nations Programme for Human Settlements (UN-Habitat).

Historical GDP of Beijing for 1978–present (SNA2008) (purchasing power parity of Chinese Yuan, as international dollar based on IMF WEO October 2022)
Year	CNY (millions)	USD (millions)	PPP (Int'l$) (millions)	Real growth (%)	CNY per capita*	USD per capita*	PPP (Int'l$.) per capita*	Reference index: USD 1 to CNY	Reference index: Int'l$. 1 to CNY
2021	4,026,960	624,190	957,432	8.5	183,980	28,517	43,742	6.4515	4.206
2020	3,594,330	521,099	846,920	1.1	164,158	23,799	38,680	6.8976	4.244
2019	3,544,510	513,809	835,575	6.1	161,776	23,451	38,137	6.8985	4.242
2018	3,310,600	500,287	782,833	6.7	150,962	22,813	35,697	6.6174	4.229
2017	2,988,300	442,593	714,221	6.8	136,172	20,168	32,546	6.7518	4.184
2016	2,704,120	407,106	677,894	6.9	123,391	18,577	30,932	6.6423	3.989
2015	2,477,910	397,841	640,121	6.9	113,692	18,253	29,370	6.2284	3.871
2014	2,292,600	373,217	609,846	7.4	106,732	17,375	28,394	6.1428	3.759
2013	2,113,460	341,255	576,818	7.7	100,569	16,240	27,448	6.1932	3.664
2012	1,902,470	301,381	534,252	7.7	92,758	14,694	26,048	6.3125	3.561
2011	1,718,880	266,130	487,764	8.1	86,246	13,353	24,474	6.4588	3.524
2010	1,496,400	221,050	440,910	10.4	78,307	11,568	23,544	6.7695	3.326
2009	1,290,900	188,977	407,481	10.0	71,059	10,402	22,430	6.8310	3.168
2008	1,181,310	170,093	369,969	9.0	68,541	9,869	21,466	6.9451	3.193
2007	1,042,550	137,105	343,736	14.4	63,629	8,368	20,979	7.6040	3.033
2006	838,700	105,208	290,308	12.8	53,438	6,703	18,497	7.9718	2.889
2005	714,980	87,281	249,296	12.3	47,182	5,760	16,451	8.1917	2.868
2000	327,780	38,809	118,148	12.0	22,054	3,022	8,081	8.2784	2.729
1995	151,620	18,156	55,275	12.0	12,762	1,529	4,653	8.3510	2.743
1990	50,080	10,470	29,184	5.2	4,635	969	2,701	4.7832	1.716
1985	25,710	8,755	18,312	8.7	2,643	972	1,882	2.9367	1.404
1980	13,910	9,283	9,273	11.8	1,544	1,009	1,029	1.4984	1.500
1978	10,880	6,462		10.5	1,257	797		1.684	

* Per-capita GDP is based on mid-year population.

=== Sector composition ===
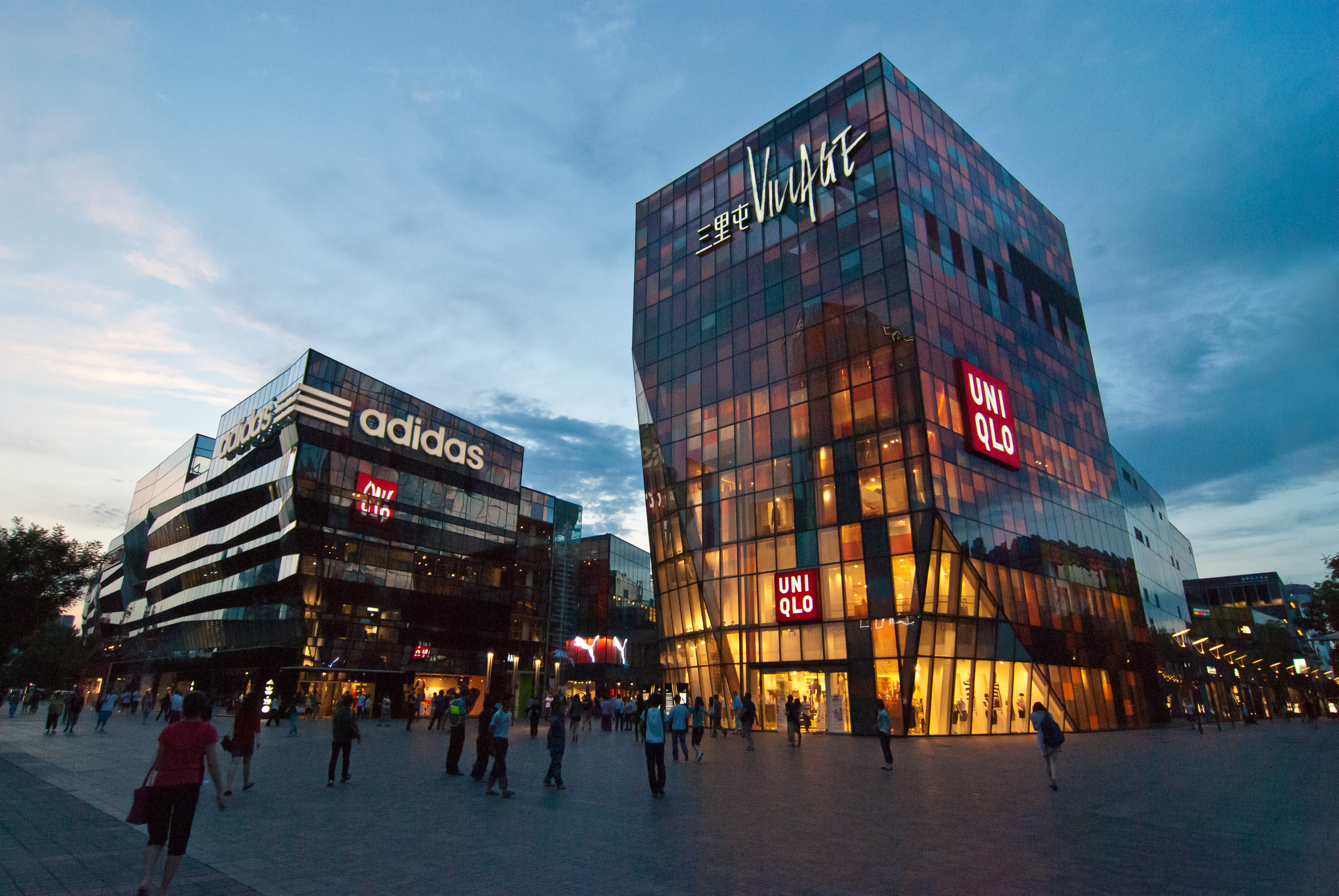
The Taikoo Li Sanlitun shopping arcade is a destination for locals and visitors.

The city has a post-industrial economy that is dominated by the tertiary sector (services), which generated 83.8% of output, followed by the secondary sector (manufacturing, construction) at 15.8% and the primary sector (agriculture, mining) at 0.26%. The services sector is broadly diversified with professional services, wholesale and retail, information technology, commercial real estate, scientific research, and residential real estate each contributing at least 6% to the city's economy in 2022.

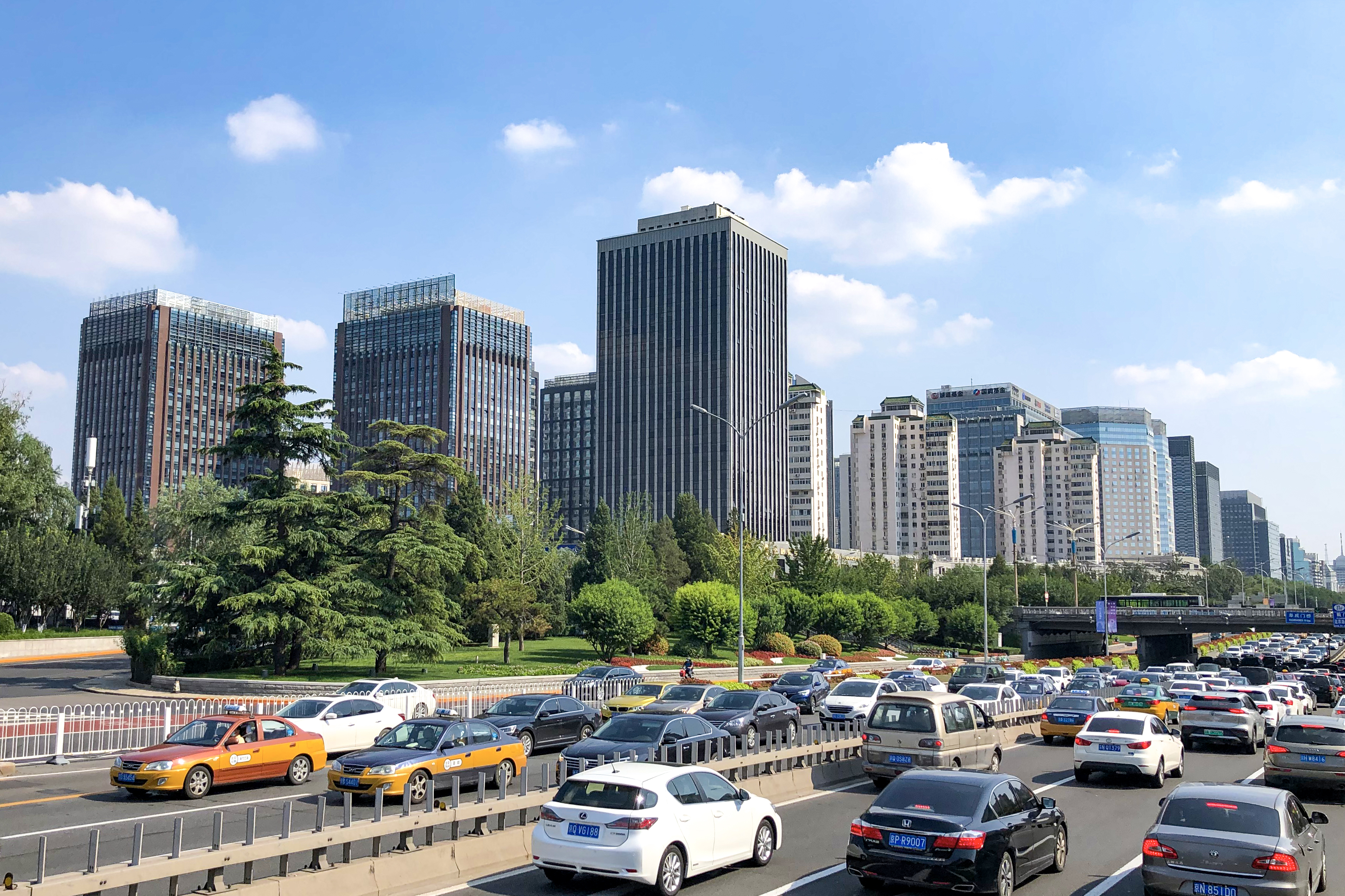
Beijing Financial Street from Fuchengmen

The single largest sub-sector remains industry, whose share of overall output has shrunk to 12.1% in 2022. The mix of industrial output has changed significantly since 2010 when the city announced that 140 highly-polluting, energy and water resource intensive enterprises would be relocated from the city in five years. The relocation of Capital Steel to neighboring Hebei province had begun in 2005. In 2013, output of automobiles, aerospace products, semiconductors, pharmaceuticals, and food processing all increased.

In the farmland around Beijing, vegetables and fruits have displaced grain as the primary crops under cultivation. In 2013, the tonnage of vegetable, edible fungus and fruit harvested was over three times that of grain. In 2013, overall acreage under cultivation shrank along with most categories of produce as more land was reforested for environmental reasons.

=== Economic zones ===
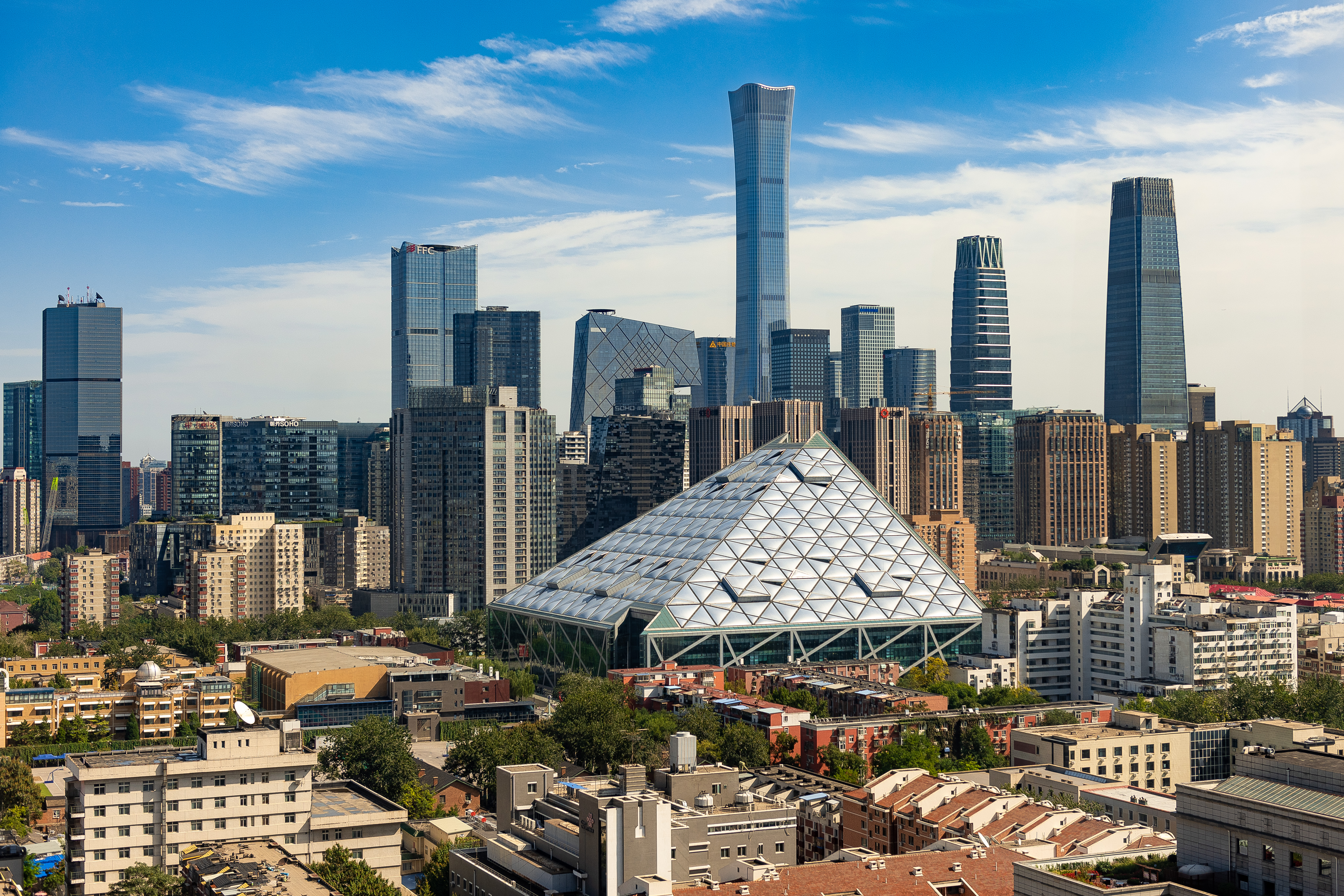
The skyline of Beijing CBD

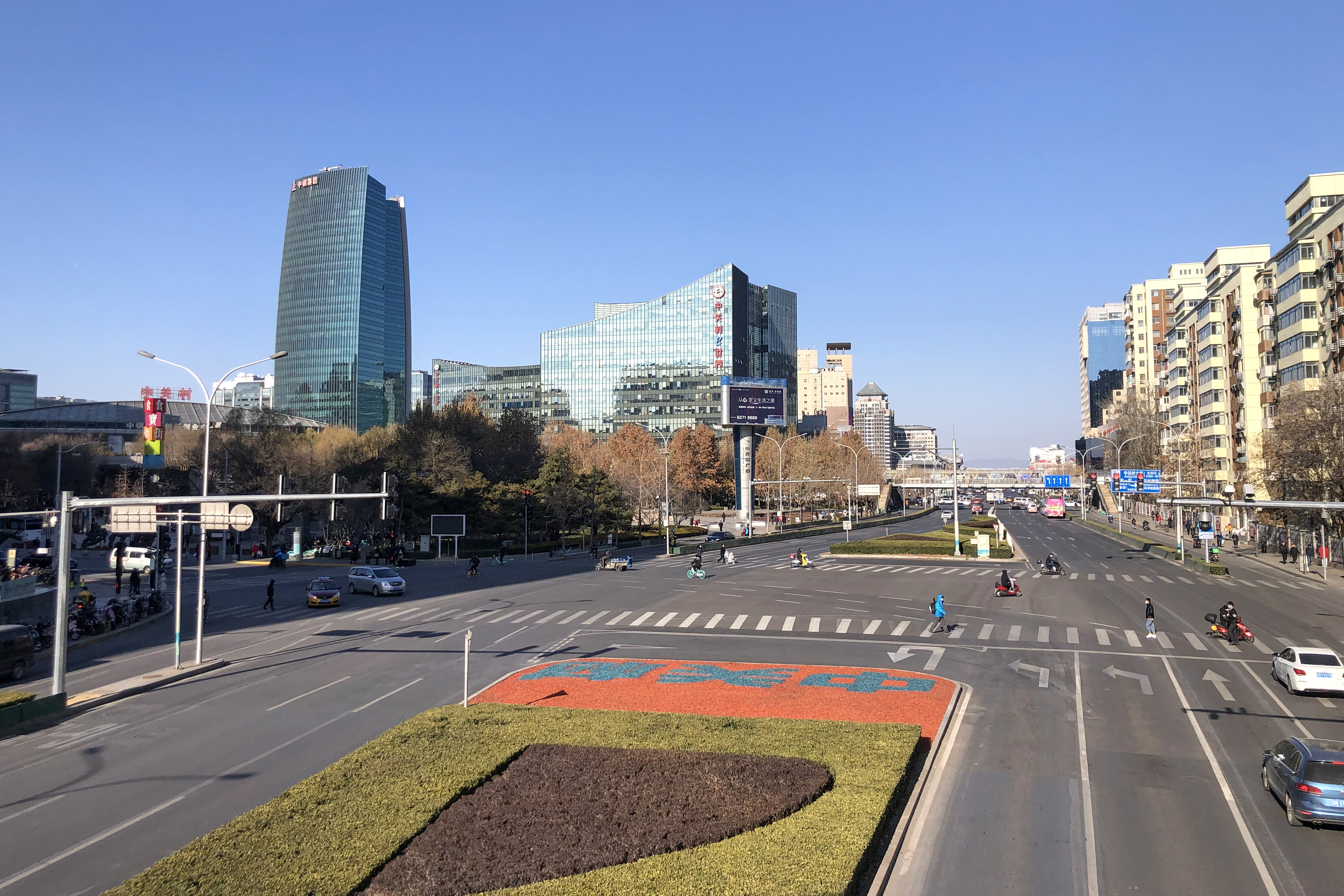
Zhongguancun is a technology hub in Haidian District.

In 2006, the city government identified six high-end economic output zones around Beijing as the primary engines for local economic growth. In 2012, the six zones produced 43.3% of the city's GDP, up from 36.5% in 2007. The six zones are:

1. Zhongguancun, China's silicon village in Haidian District northwest of the city, is home to both established and start-up tech companies. In the first two quarters of 2014, 9,895 companies registered in the six zones, among which 6,150 were based in Zhongguancun. Zhongguancun is also the center of Beijing-Tianjin-Shijiazhuang Hi-Tech Industrial Belt.
2. Beijing Financial Street, in Xicheng District on the west side of the city between Fuxingmen and Fuchengmen, is lined with headquarters of large state banks and insurance companies. The country's financial regulatory agencies including the central bank, bank regulator, securities regulator, and foreign exchange authority are located in the neighborhood.
3. Beijing Central Business District (CBD), is actually located to the east of downtown, near the embassies along the eastern Third Ring Road between Jianguomenwai and Chaoyangmenwai. The CBD is home to most of the city's skyscraper office buildings. Most of the city's foreign companies and professional service firms are based in the CBD.
4. Beijing Economic and Technological Development Area, better known as Yizhuang, is an industrial park the straddles the southern Fifth Ring Road in Daxing District. It has attracted pharmaceutical, information technology, and materials engineering companies.
5. Beijing Airport Economic Zone was created in 1993 and surrounds the Beijing Capital International Airport in Shunyi District northeast of the city. In addition to logistics, airline services, and trading firms, this zone is also home to Beijing's automobile assembly plants.
6. Beijing Olympic Center Zone surrounds the Olympic Green due north of downtown and is developing into an entertainment, sports, tourism and business convention center.

Shijingshan, on the western outskirts of the city, was a traditional heavy industrial base of the steel-maker Shougang Group. After production ceased in 2010, the site was transformed into a center for industrial culture, fairs, art exhibits and sports events, including a venue for the 2022 Winter Olympics. A former chemical industrial park in the far eastern suburbs has been converted into a forest park.

== Demographics ==
Historical population

Year	Pop.	±% p.a.
1953	2,768,149	—
1964	7,568,495	+9.57%
1982	9,230,687	+1.11%
1990	10,819,407	+2.00%

Year	Pop.	±% p.a.
2000	13,569,194	+2.29%
2010	19,612,368	+3.75%
2020	21,893,095	+1.11%

Population size may be affected by changes on administrative divisions.

In 2024, Beijing had a total population of 21.83 million within the municipality, of which 19.26 million (88.2 percent) resided in urban districts or suburban townships and 2.57 million (11.8) lived in rural villages. The encompassing metropolitan area was estimated by the OECD (Organisation for Economic Co-operation and Development) to have, as of 2010, a population of 24.9 million.

Within China, the city ranked second in urban population after Shanghai and the third in municipal population after Shanghai and Chongqing. Beijing also ranks among the most populous cities in the world, a distinction the city has held for much of the past 800 years, especially during the 15th to early 19th centuries when it was the largest city in the world.

About 13 million of the city's residents in 2013 had local hukou permits, which entitles them to permanent residence in Beijing. The remaining 8 million residents had hukou permits elsewhere and were not eligible to receive some social benefits provided by the Beijing municipal government.

The population increased in 2013 by 455,000 or about 7% from the previous year and continued a decade-long trend of rapid growth. The total population in 2004 was 14.213 million. The population gains are driven largely by migration. The population's rate of natural increase in 2013 was a mere 0.441%, based on a birth rate of 8.93 and a mortality rate of 4.52. The gender balance was 51.6% males and 48.4% females.

Working age people account for nearly 73.6% of the population. Compared to 2004, residents age 0–14 as a proportion of the population dropped from 9.95% to 9.92% in 2013, but again increased to 12.1% in 2021. Residents over the age of 65 declined from 11.12% to 8.58%, but increased to 14.2% in 2021. From 2002 to 2011, the percentage of city residents with at least some college education nearly doubled, from 20.4% to 37.3%, and further increased to 49.1% by 2021. About 66.4% have senior secondary school education and 88.2% had reached middle school.

According to the 2010 census, nearly 96% of Beijing's population are ethnic Han Chinese. Of the 800,000 ethnic minority population living in the capital, Manchu (336,000), Hui (249,000), Korean (77,000), Mongol (37,000) and Tujia (24,000) constitute the five largest groups. In addition, there were 8,045 Hong Kong residents, 500 Macau residents, and 7,772 Taiwan residents along with 91,128 registered foreigners living in Beijing. A study by the Beijing Academy of Sciences estimates that in 2010 there were on average 200,000 foreigners living in Beijing on any given day including students, business travellers and tourists that are not counted as registered residents.

In 2017 the Chinese government implemented population controls for Beijing and Shanghai to fight what it called the "big city disease" which includes congestion, pollution, and shortages of education and health care services. From this policy, Beijing's population declined by 20,000 from 2016 to 2017. Some low-income people are being forcibly removed from the city as both legal and illegal housing is being demolished in some high-density residential neighborhoods. The population is being redistributed to Jing-Jin-Ji and Xiong'an New Area, the transfer to the latter expected to include 300,000-500,000 people working in government research, universities, and corporate headquarters.

== Education and research ==
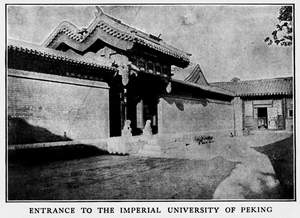
Entrance to the Imperial University of Peking, c. 1898-1900

Beijing is a world-leading center for scientific and technological innovation. It has been ranked the No. 1 city in the world with the largest scientific research output, as tracked by the Nature Index since the list's inception in 2016. When compared to countries, Beijing ranked above Germany, securing third place worldwide after China and the US, according to the Nature Index for 2025. For example, Beijing's share of the 2024 Nature Index is 5,501.45 with 11,915 counts, while Germany's share is 5,000.90 with 10,559 counts. The capital also leads the world with the highest share of articles published in chemistry, physical sciences, Earth & environmental sciences, and natural sciences, especially in the United Nations 17 Sustainable Development Goals (SDGs)-related output. As of 2024, it stands as the most prolific scientific research center in biological sciences and health science in the Asia-Pacific, ranking third and sixth in the world, respectively. According to the WIPO Innovation Cluster Ranking, in 2026 the Beijing area ranked 4th among the world's top 100 science and technology clusters.

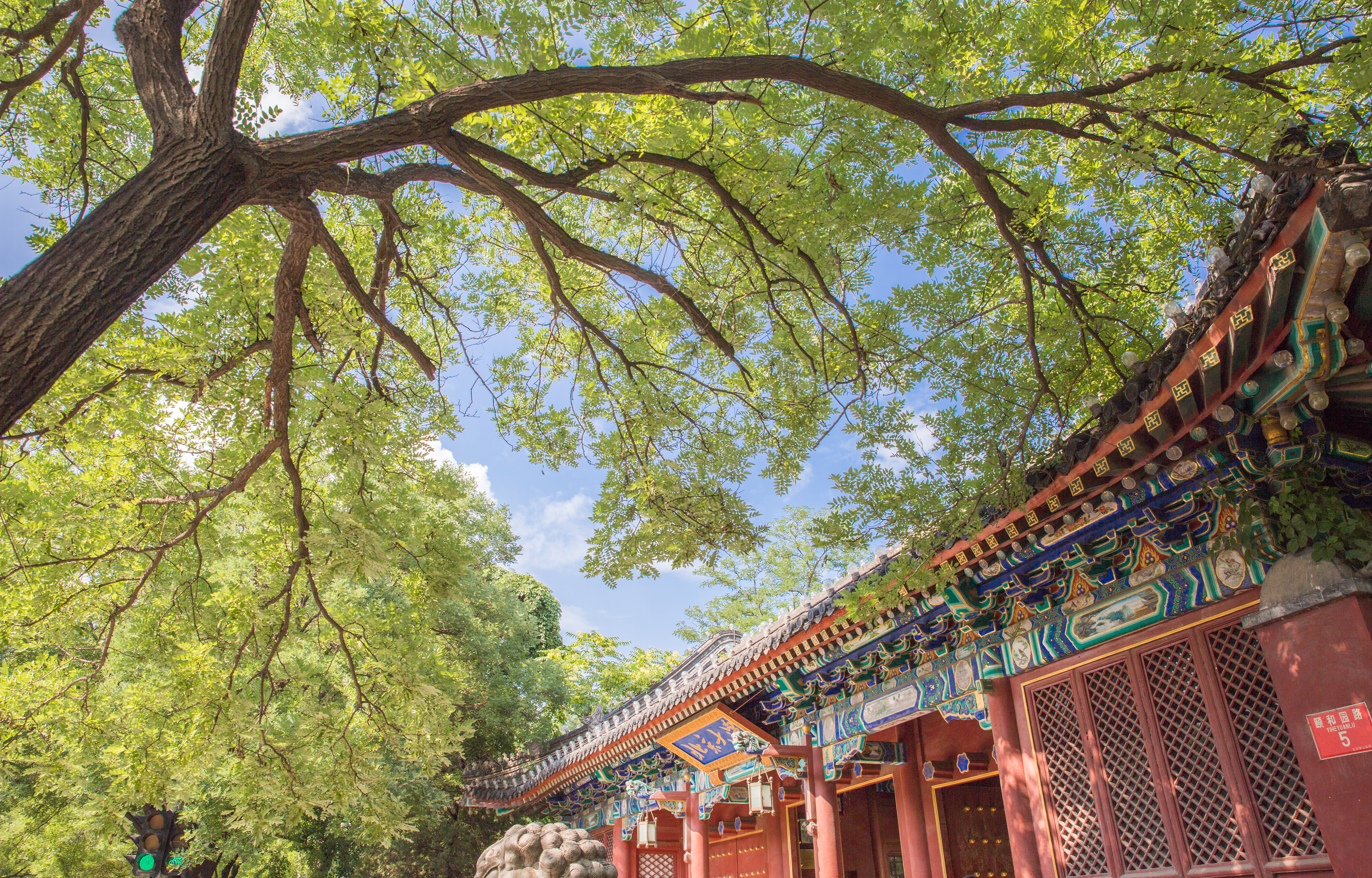
The West Gate of Peking University

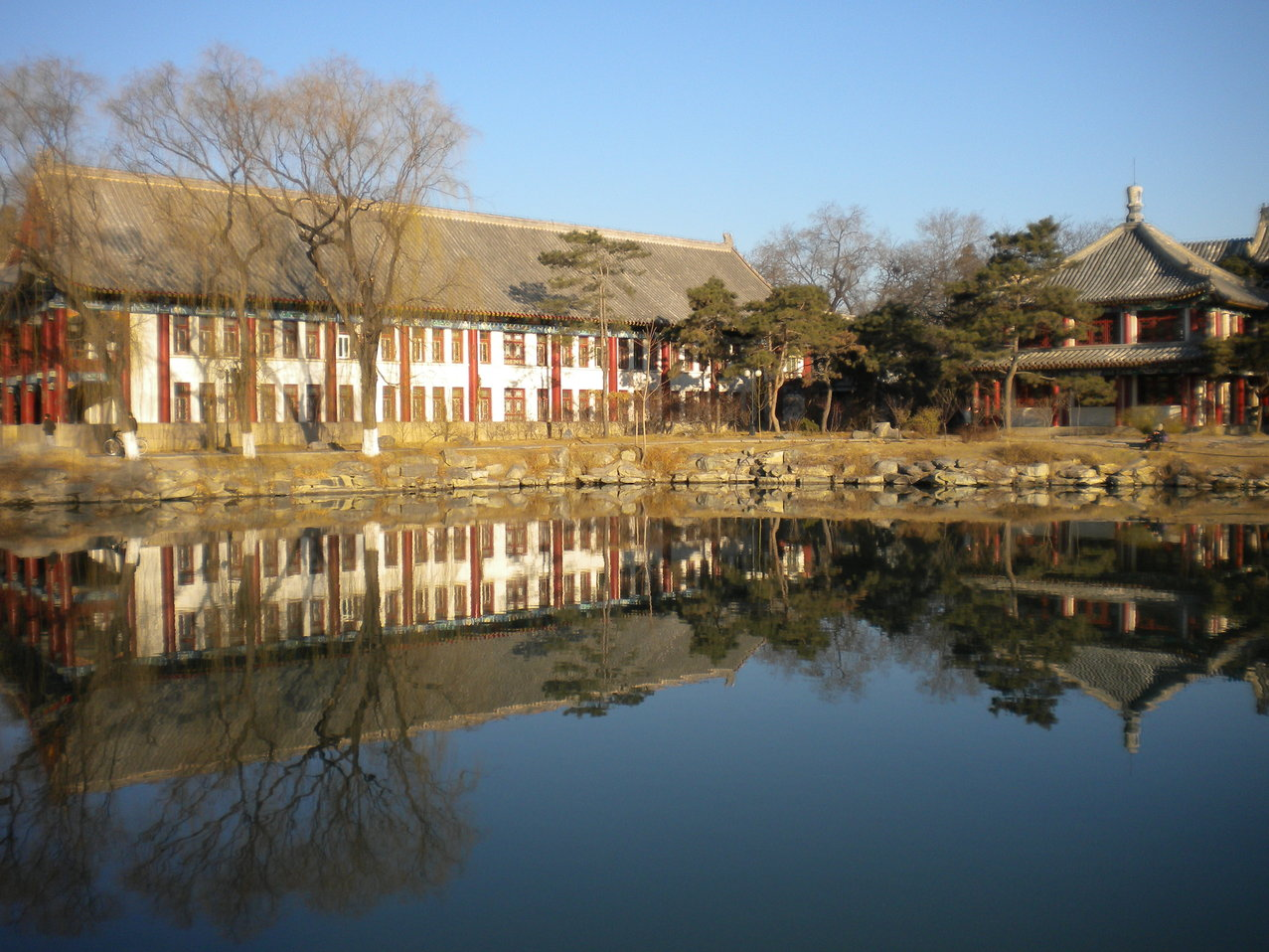
Campus of the Peking University

Beijing has over 90 public colleges and universities, making it the largest urban public university system in Asia and the first city in China with the most higher education institutions. It is also home to the two best universities (Tsinghua and Peking) in the whole of the Asia & Oceania region and emerging countries, with their rankings at #11 and #13 places in the world, respectively by the 2027 Times Higher Education World University Rankings. Both are members of the C9 League, an alliance of elite Chinese universities offering comprehensive and leading education. Beijing represents more than one-fifth of 147 Double First-Class Universities, a national plan to develop elite Chinese universities into world-class institutions by the end of 2050.

According to the U.S. News & World Report Best Global University Ranking for 2026–2027, Beijing has the highest number of universities among major cities in the world included in the ranking, totaling 31, with 2 universities in the top 20, 7 institutions in the top 200 and 12 institutions in the top 500. According to the Academic Ranking of World Universities (ARWU) for 2026, Beijing has 2 universities in the top 25, 5 institutions in the top 150, 11 institutions in the top 300, and 16 institutions in the top 500. A number of Beijing's most prestigious universities consistently rank among the best in the Asia-Pacific and the world, including Peking University, Tsinghua University, Renmin University of China, Beijing Normal University, University of Chinese Academy of Sciences, Beihang University, Beijing Institute of Technology, China Agricultural University, Minzu University of China, University of Science and Technology Beijing, Beijing University of Chemical Technology, University of International Business and Economics, University of Chinese Academy of Social Sciences and Central University of Finance and Economics. These universities were selected as "985 universities" or "211 universities" by the Chinese government in order to build world-class universities.

The city is a seat of the Chinese Academy of Sciences, which has been consistently ranked the No. 1 research institute in the world by Nature Index since the list's inception in 2014. The academy also runs the University of the Chinese Academy of Sciences, which is located in Beijing and ranked among the world's top five research institutions by the Nature Index. Beijing is also a site of the Chinese Academy of Engineering, the China Academy of Space Technology, the China Academy of Engineering Physics, the Chinese Academy of Social Sciences, the Chinese Academy of Agricultural Sciences, the Chinese Academy of Cultural Heritage, the Chinese Academy of Geological Sciences, the Chinese Academy of Fishery Sciences, the Chinese Academy for Environmental Planning, the China Academy of Chinese Medical Sciences and the National Natural Science Foundation of China.

Some of the national key universities in Beijing are:

- Beijing Forestry University
- Beijing Jiaotong University
- Beijing University of Technology
- Beijing University of Chinese Medicine
- Beijing University of Posts and Telecommunications
- Beijing Electronic Science and Technology Institute
- Beijing Foreign Studies University
- Beijing Language and Culture University
- Beijing Sport University
- Central Conservatory of Music
- Central Academy of Fine Arts
- Central Academy of Drama
- China University of Geosciences (Beijing)
- China University of Petroleum (Beijing)
- China University of Mining and Technology (Beijing)
- China University of Political Science and Law
- China Foreign Affairs University
- Chinese People's Public Security University
- China Women's University
- China Youth University for Political Sciences
- China Institute of Industrial Relations
- Communication University of China
- North China Electric Power University
- Peking Union Medical College
- University of International Relations

Beijing is also home to several religious institutions, Some of them are listed as follows:

- China Islamic Institute (中国伊斯兰教经学院)
- Beijing Islamic Institute (北京伊斯兰教经学院)
- The Buddhist Academy of China (中国佛学院)
- High-level Tibetan Buddhism College of China (中国藏语系高级佛学院)
- National Seminary of Catholic Church in China (中国天主教神哲学院)

The city's compulsory education system is among the best in the world: in 2018, 15-year-old students from Beijing (together with Shanghai, Zhejiang and Jiangsu) outperformed all of the other 78 participating countries in all categories (math, reading, and science) in the Program for International Student Assessment, a worldwide study of academic performance conducted by the OECD.

== Culture ==
People native to urban Beijing speak the Beijing dialect, which belongs to the Mandarin variety of spoken Chinese. This speech is the basis for putonghua, the standard spoken language used in mainland China and Taiwan, and one of the four official languages of Singapore. Rural areas of Beijing Municipality have their own dialects akin to those of Hebei province, which surrounds Beijing Municipality.

Younger residents of Beijing have become more attracted to the nightlife, which has flourished in recent decades, breaking prior cultural traditions that had practically restricted it to the upper class. Today, Houhai, Sanlitun and Wudaokou are Beijing's nightlife hotspots.

=== Art ===
Peking opera

Beijing or Peking opera is a traditional form of Chinese theater well known throughout the nation. Commonly lauded as one of the highest achievements of Chinese culture, Beijing opera is performed through a combination of song, spoken dialogue, and codified action sequences involving gestures, movement, fighting and acrobatics. Much of Beijing opera is carried out in an archaic stage dialect quite different from Modern Standard Chinese and from the modern Beijing dialect.

The cloisonné (or Jingtailan, literally "Blue of Jingtai") metalworking technique and tradition is a Beijing art speciality, and is one of the most revered traditional crafts in China. Cloisonné making requires elaborate and complicated processes which include base-hammering, copper-strip inlay, soldering, enamel-filling, enamel-firing, surface polishing and gilding. Beijing's lacquerware is also well known for its sophisticated and intricate patterns and images carved into its surface, and the various decoration techniques of lacquer include "carved lacquer" and "engraved gold".

In 2012 Beijing was named as City of Design and became part of the UNESCO Creative Cities Network.

=== Cuisine ===
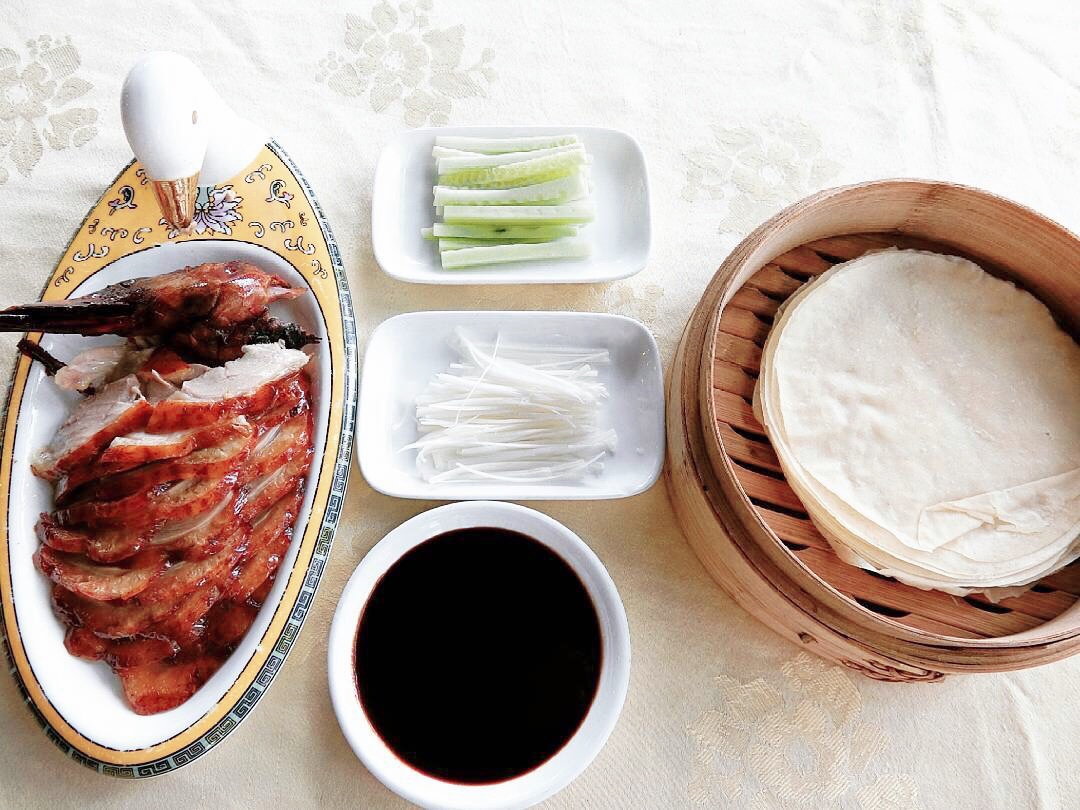
Sliced Peking duck served with traditional condiments

Beijing cuisine has been shaped by centuries of imperial court cooking, the culinary traditions of surrounding regions, and the influence of ethnic minorities including Manchu and Mongol peoples. As the imperial capital for over 500 years, Beijing attracted cooks and ingredients from across China, giving rise to a distinctive style that blends northern Chinese staples with court refinement.

Peking duck is perhaps the best known dish. Fuling jiabing, a traditional Beijing snack food, is a pancake (bing) resembling a flat disk with a filling made from fu ling, a fungus used in traditional Chinese medicine. Teahouses are also common in Beijing. Instant-boiled mutton, served in a traditional copper hot pot, is another iconic Beijing dish with origins dating to the Yuan dynasty.

=== Places of interest ===
According to the National Geographic:

...the city remains an epicenter of tradition with the treasures of nearly 2,000 years as the imperial capital still on view—in the famed Forbidden City and in the city's lush pavilions and gardens...

— National Geographic

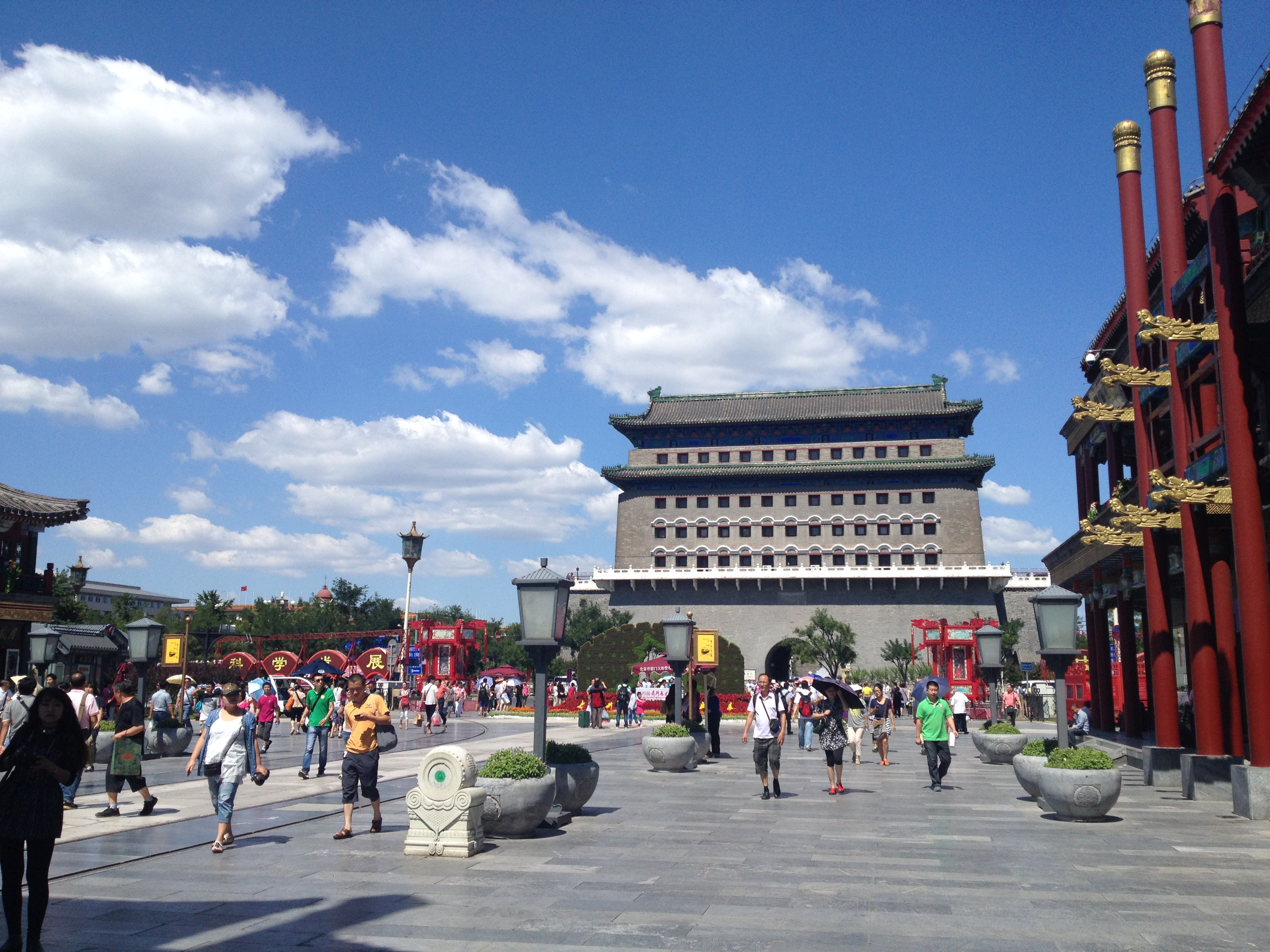
Qianmen Avenue is a traditional commercial street outside Qianmen Gate along the southern Central Axis.

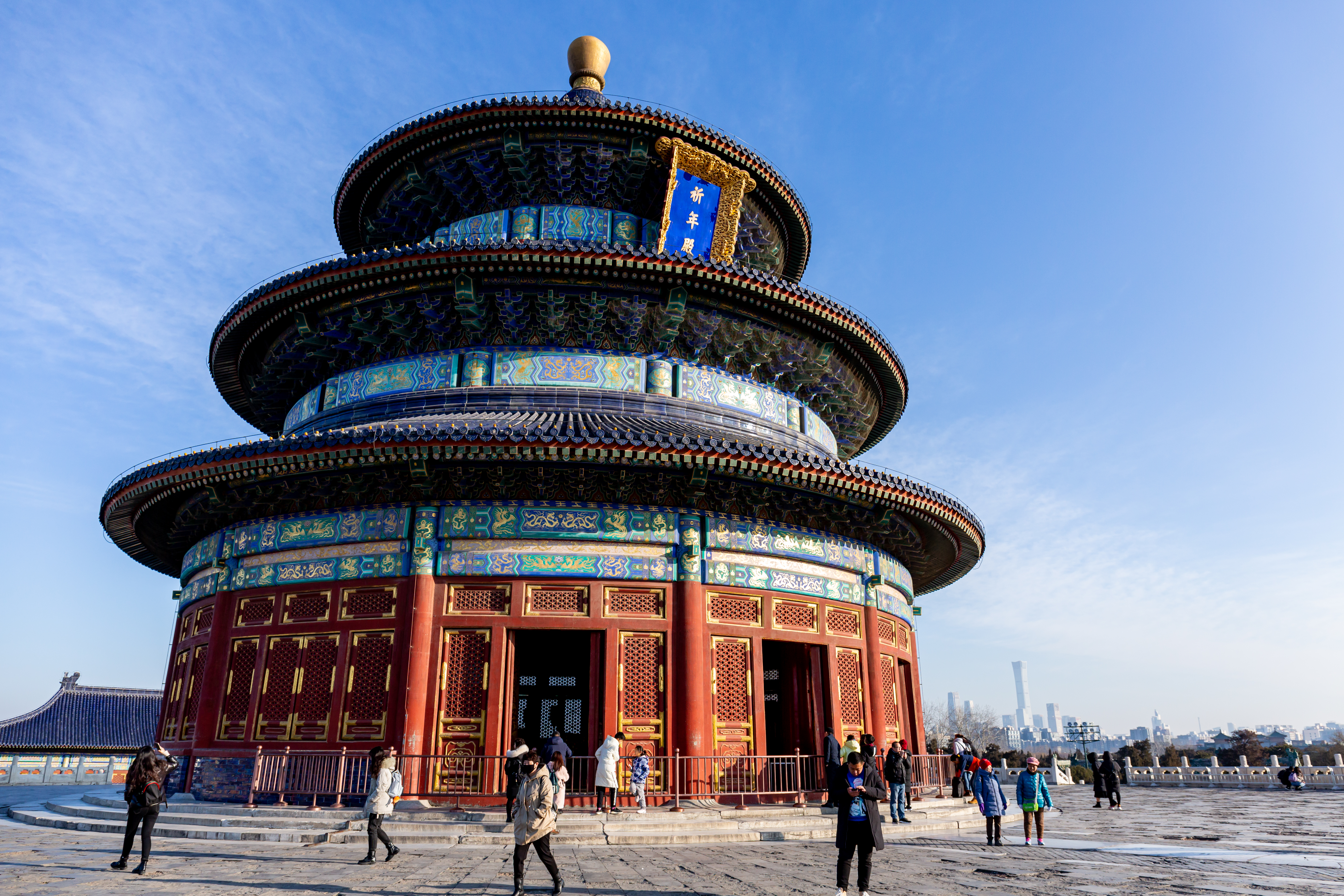
Temple of Heaven is one of the eight UNESCO World Heritage Sites in Beijing.

At the historical heart of Beijing lies the Forbidden City, the enormous palace compound that was the home of the emperors of the Ming and Qing dynasties; the Forbidden City hosts the Palace Museum, which contains imperial collections of Chinese art. Surrounding the Forbidden City are several former imperial gardens, parks and scenic areas, notably Beihai, Shichahai, Jingshan and Zhongshan Park. These places, particularly Beihai Park, are described as masterpieces of Chinese gardening art, and are tourist destinations of historical importance; in the modern era, Zhongnanhai has also been the political heart of various Chinese governments and regimes and is now the headquarters of the Chinese Communist Party and the State Council. From Tiananmen Square, right across from the Forbidden City, there are several notable sites, such as the Tian'anmen, Qianmen, the Great Hall of the People, the National Museum of China, the Monument to the People's Heroes, and the Mausoleum of Mao Zedong. The Summer Palace and the Old Summer Palace both lie at the western part of the city; the former, a UNESCO World Heritage Site, contains a comprehensive collection of imperial gardens and palaces that served as the summer retreats for the Qing imperial family.

Among the best known religious sites in the city is the Temple of Heaven (Tiantan), located in southeastern Beijing, also a UNESCO World Heritage Site, where emperors of the Ming and Qing dynasties made visits for annual ceremonies of prayers to Heaven for good harvest. In the north of the city is the Temple of Earth (Ditan), while the Temple of the Sun (Ritan) and the Temple of the Moon (Yuetan) lie in the eastern and western urban areas respectively. Other well-known temple sites include the Dongyue Temple, Tanzhe Temple, Miaoying Temple, White Cloud Temple, Yonghe Temple, Fayuan Temple, Wanshou Temple and Big Bell Temple. The city also has its own Confucius Temple, and a Guozijian or Imperial Academy. The Cathedral of the Immaculate Conception, built in 1605, is the oldest Catholic church in Beijing. The Niujie Mosque is the oldest mosque in Beijing, with a history stretching back over a thousand years.

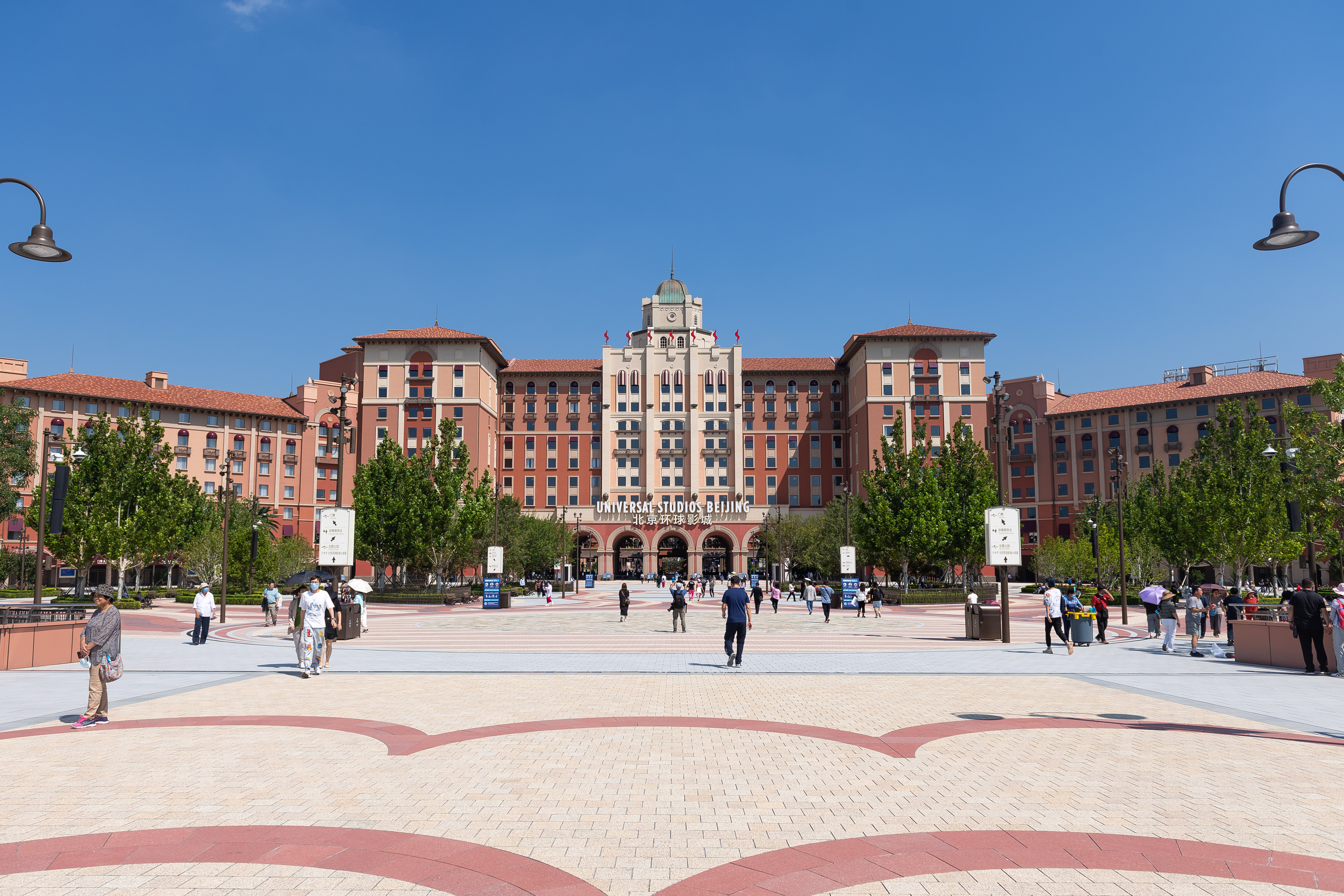
Universal Studios Beijing

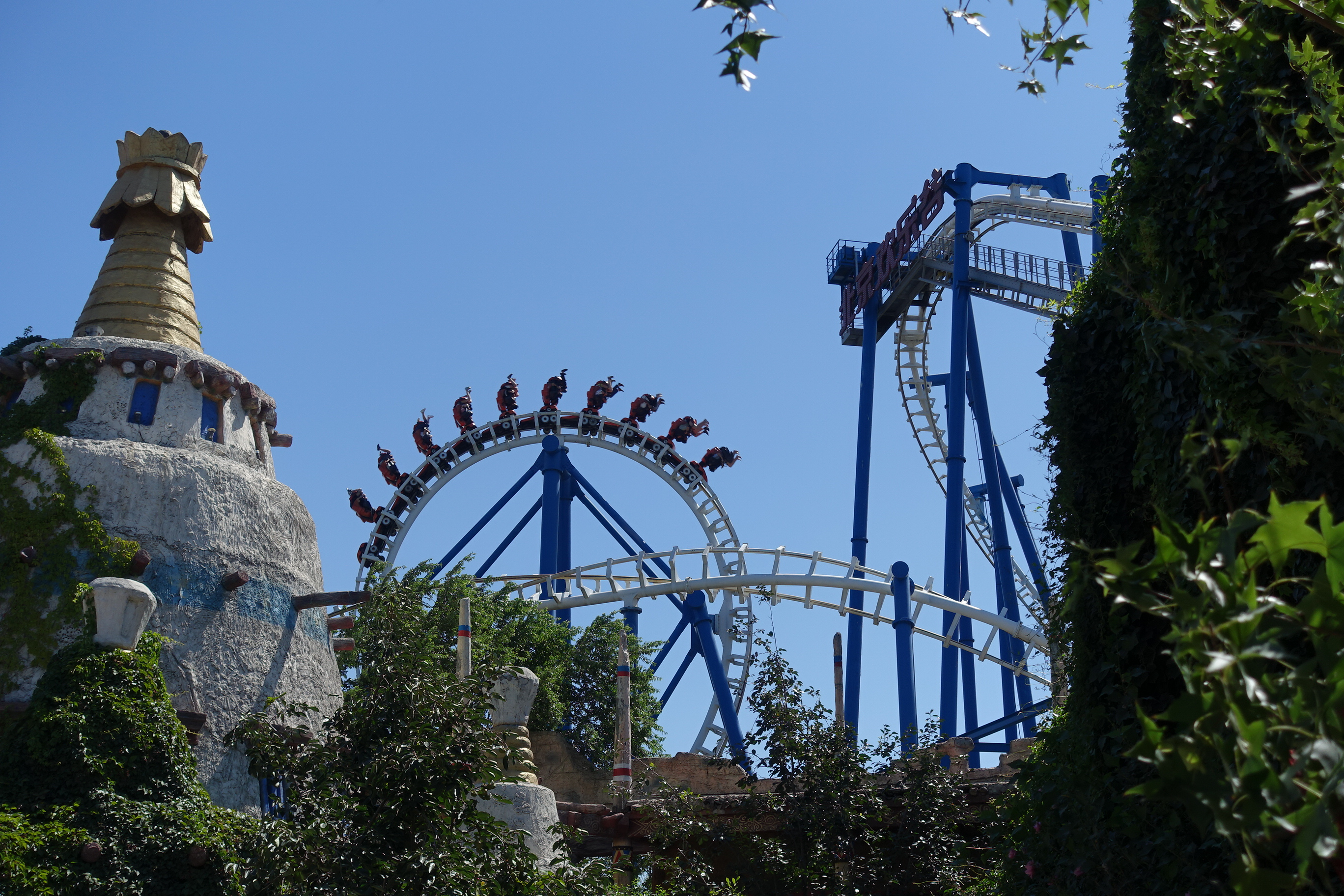
Happy Valley Beijing

Beijing contains several well-preserved pagodas and stone pagodas, such as the towering Pagoda of Tianning Temple, which was built during the Liao dynasty from 1100 to 1120, and the Pagoda of Cishou Temple, which was built in 1576 during the Ming dynasty. Historically noteworthy stone bridges include the 12th-century Lugou Bridge, the 17th-century Baliqiao bridge, and the 18th-century Jade Belt Bridge. The Beijing Ancient Observatory displays pre-telescopic spheres dating back to the Ming and Qing dynasties. The Fragrant Hills (Xiangshan) is a public park that consists of natural landscaped areas as well as traditional and cultural relics. The Beijing Botanical Garden exhibits over 6,000 species of plants, including a variety of trees, bushes and flowers, and an extensive peony garden. The Taoranting, Longtan, Chaoyang, Haidian, Milu Yuan and Zizhu Yuan parks are some of the notable recreational parks in the city. The Beijing Zoo is a center of zoological research that also contains rare animals from various continents, including the Chinese giant panda.

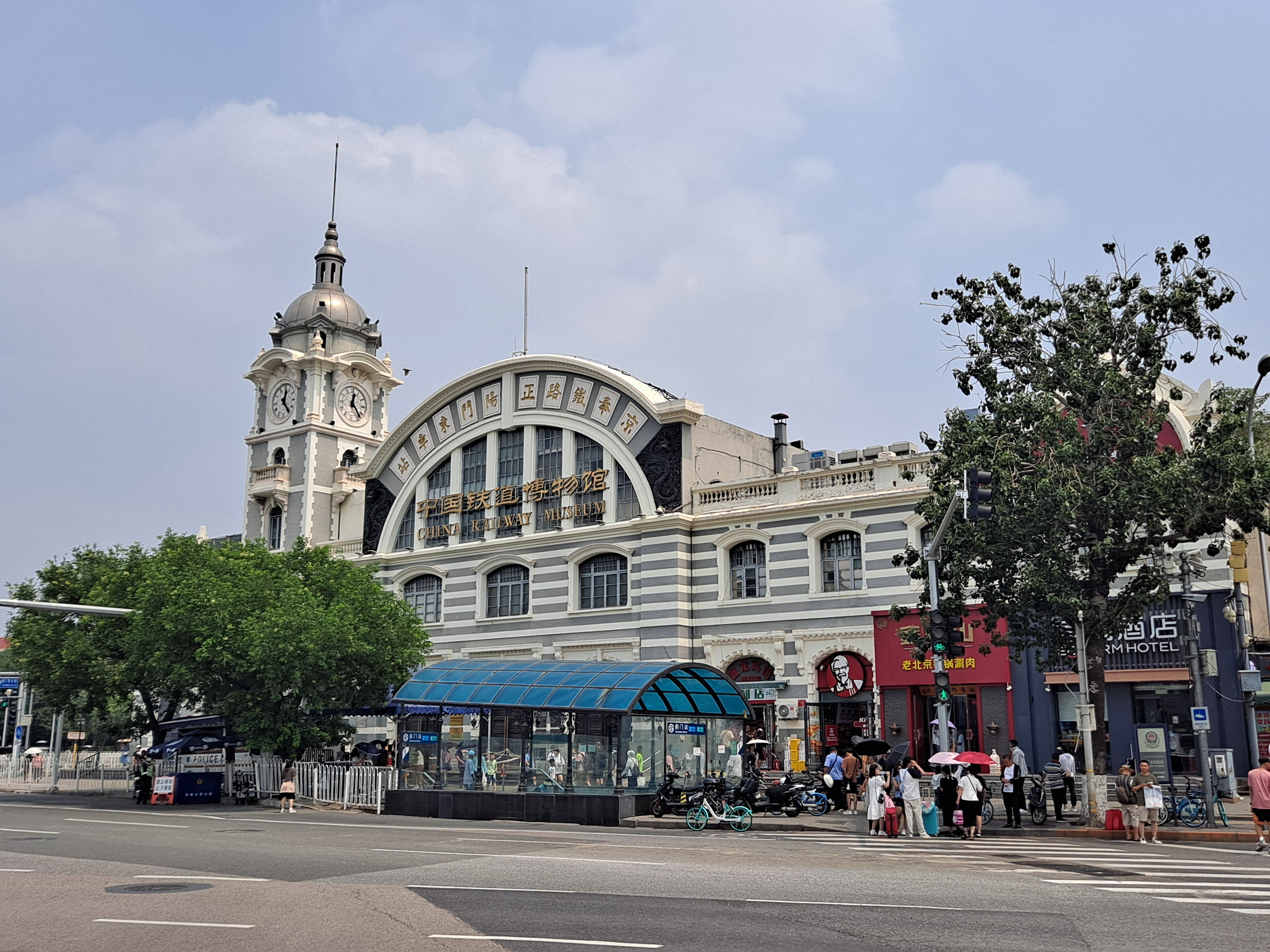
Beijing Railway Museum

There are 144 museums and galleries (as of June 2008) in the city. In addition to the Palace Museum in the Forbidden City and the National Museum of China, other major museums include the National Art Museum of China, the Capital Museum, the Beijing Art Museum, the Military Museum of the Chinese People's Revolution, the Geological Museum of China, the Beijing Museum of Natural History and the Paleozoological Museum of China.

Located at the outskirts of urban Beijing, but within its municipality are the Thirteen Tombs of the Ming dynasty, the lavish and elaborate burial sites of thirteen Ming emperors, which have been designated as part of the UNESCO World Heritage Site Imperial Tombs of the Ming and Qing Dynasties. The archaeological Peking Man site at Zhoukoudian is another World Heritage Site within the municipality, containing a wealth of discoveries, among them one of the first specimens of Homo erectus and an assemblage of bones of the gigantic hyena Pachycrocuta brevirostris. There are several sections of the UNESCO World Heritage Site Great Wall of China, most notably Badaling, Jinshanling, Simatai and Mutianyu. According to the World Travel & Tourism Council (WTTC), Beijing is the second highest earning tourist city in the world after Shanghai. Theme parks located within the city include Universal Studios Beijing and Happy Valley Beijing, both of which are among the most visited theme parks in Asia.

=== Intangible cultural heritage ===
The cultural heritage of Beijing is rich and diverse. Starting 2006, the Beijing government started the process of selecting and preserving cultural heritages. Five cultural heritage lists have been published over the years. 288 distinct practices are categorized as cultural heritage. These 288 cultural heritages are further divided into ten categories, namely folk music, folk dance, traditional opera, melodious art, juggling and game, folk art, traditional handicraft, traditional medicine, folk literature and folklore.

- Folk music
  - Zhihua Temple music
  - Tongzhou shanty
- Folk dance
  - Tongzhou Dragon dance
  - Miliangtun Stilts
- Traditional opera
  - Kunqu
  - Peking opera
- Melodious art
  - Xiangsheng
- Acrobatic Performance and game
  - Weiqi (Go)
  - Xiangqi
- Folk art
  - Ivory carving
- Traditional handicraft
  - Peking duck manufacturing techniques
  - Cloisonné manufacturing techniques
- Traditional medicine
  - Tong Ren Tang culture
- Folk literature
- Folklore
  - Miaohui
  - Lantern Festival

=== Religion ===
The religious heritage of Beijing is rich and diverse as Chinese folk religion, Taoism, Buddhism, Confucianism, Islam and Christianity all have significant historical presence in the city. As the national capital, the city also hosts the State Administration for Religious Affairs and various state-sponsored institutions of the leading religions. In recent decades, foreign residents have brought other religions to the city. According to Wang Zhiyun of the Chinese Academy of Social Sciences, in 2010 there were 2.2 million Buddhists in the city, equal to 11.2% of the total population. According to the Chinese General Social Survey of 2009, Christians constitute 0.78% of the city's population. According to a 2010 survey, Muslims constitute 1.76% of the population of Beijing.

==== Chinese folk religion and Taoism ====
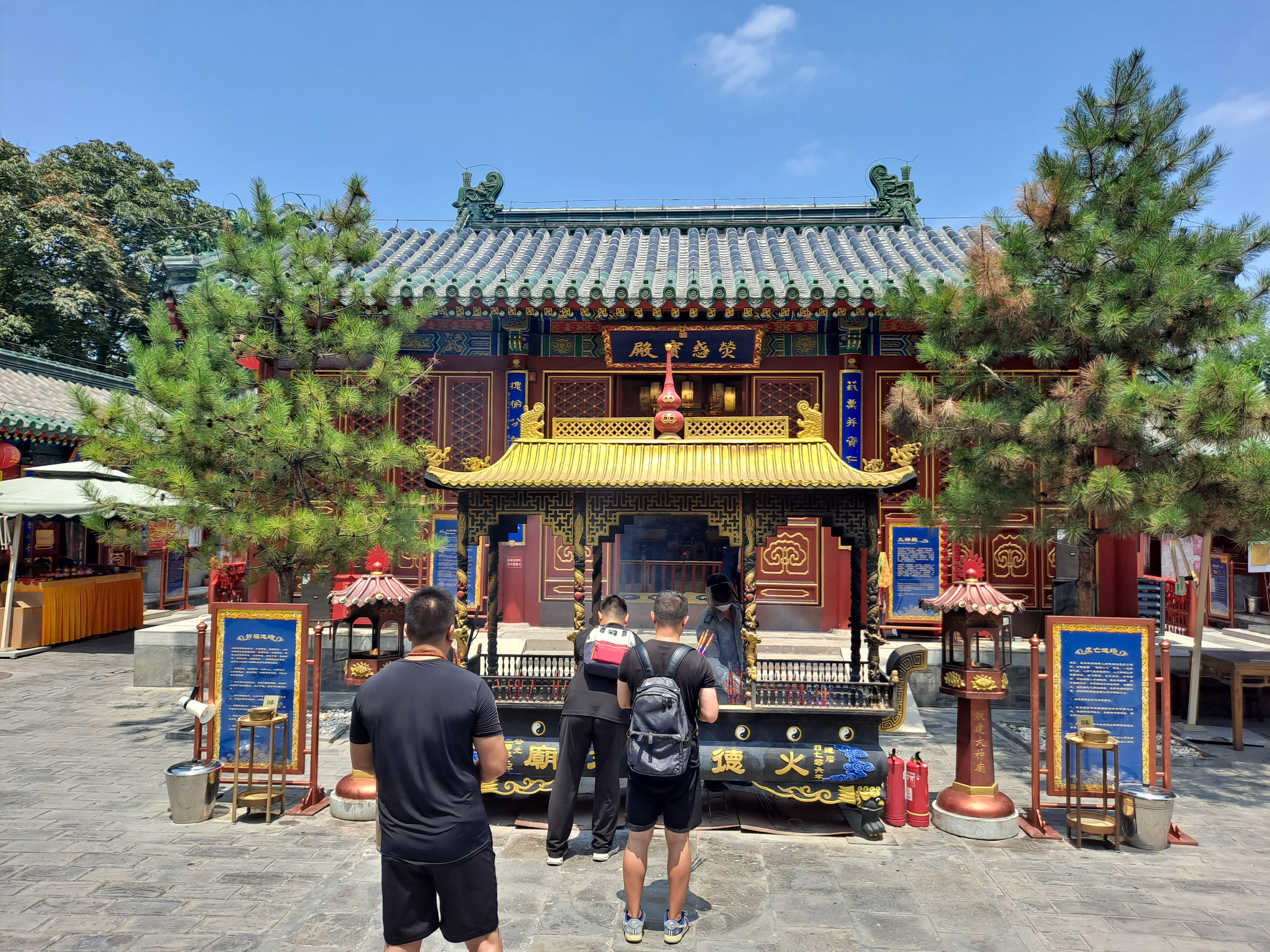
Fire God Temple near Di'anmen

Beijing has many temples dedicated to folk religious and communal deities, many of which are being reconstructed or refurbished in the 2000s and 2010s. Yearly sacrifices to the God of Heaven (祭天; jìtiān) at the Temple of Heaven have been resumed by Confucian groups in the 2010s.

There are temples for the worship of Taoist goddesses (娘娘; Niángniáng) in the city, including one primarily dedicated to Bixia Yuanjun near the Olympic Village. Mount Miaofeng is a major center of Taoist goddess worship. There are also many temples consecrated to the Dragon God, to the Medicine Master (药王; Yàowáng), to deified Guan Yu, to the Fire God (火神; Huǒshén), to the Wealth God, temples of the City God, and at least one temple consecrated to the Yellow Emperor (轩辕黄帝; Xuānyuán Huángdì) in Pinggu District. Many of these temples are governed by the Beijing Taoist Association, such as the Fire God Temple of the Shicha Lake, while many others are not and are governed by popular committees and locals.

The national Chinese Taoist Association and Chinese Taoist College have their headquarters at the White Cloud Temple of Quanzhen Taoism, which was founded in 741 and rebuilt numerous times. The Beijing Dongyue Temple outside Chaoyangmen is the largest temple of Zhengyi Taoism in the city. The local Beijing Taoist Association has its headquarters at the Lüzu Temple near Fuxingmen.

==== Buddhism ====
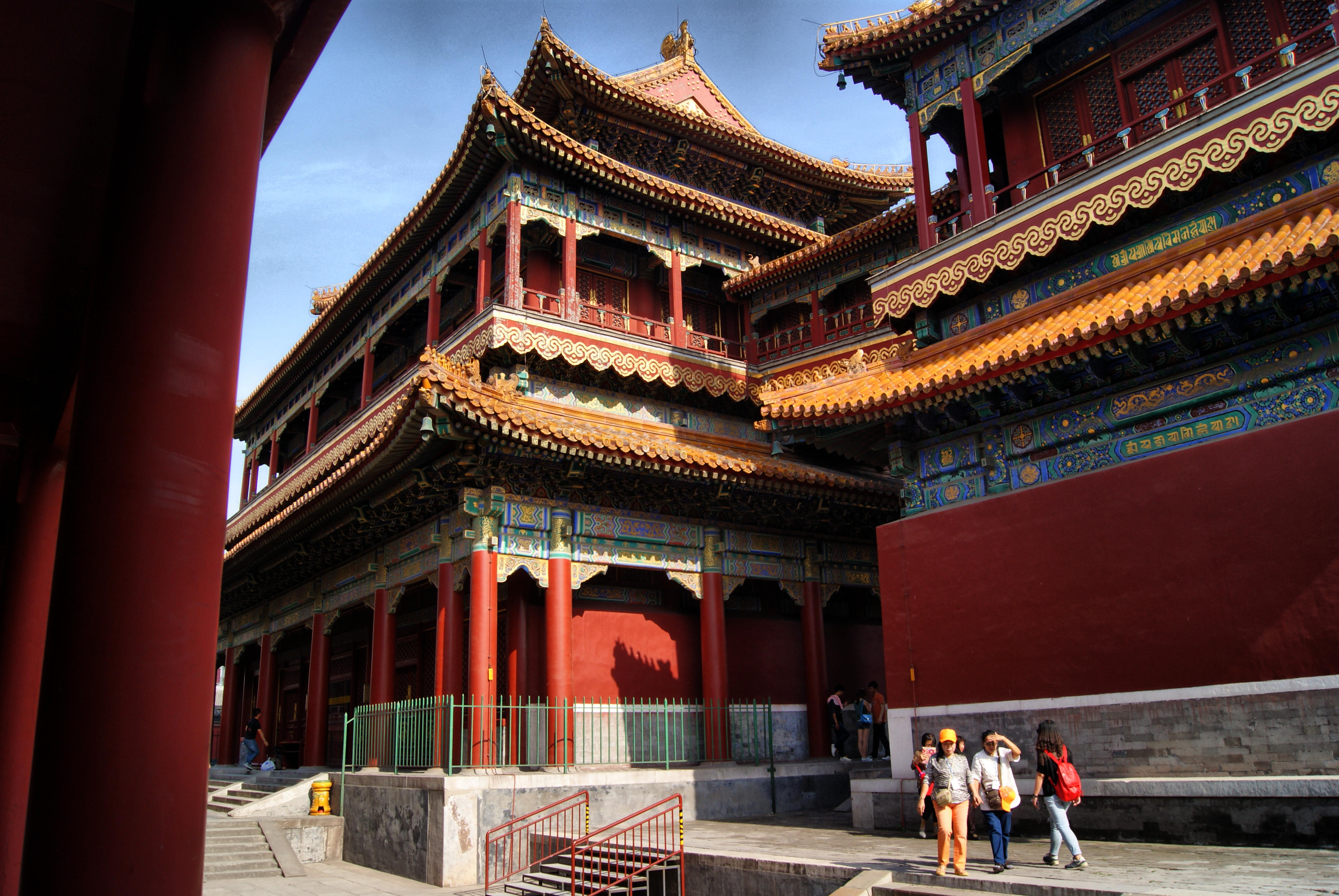
Yonghe Temple of Tibetan Buddhism

11% of the population of Beijing practices East Asian Buddhism. The Buddhist Association of China, the state's supervisory organ overseeing all Buddhist institutions in mainland China, is headquartered in the Guangji Temple, a temple founded over 800 years ago during the Jin dynasty (1115–1234) in what is now Fuchengmennei (阜成门内). The Beijing Buddhist Association along with the Buddhist Choir and Orchestra are based in the Guanghua Temple, which dates to the Yuan dynasty over 700 years ago. The Buddhist Academy of China and its library are housed in the Fayuan Temple near Caishikou. The Fayuan Temple, which dates to the Tang dynasty 1300 years ago, is the oldest temple in urban Beijing. The Tongjiao Temple inside Dongzhimen is the city's only Buddhist nunnery.

The Xihuang Temple originally dates to the Liao dynasty. In 1651, the temple was commissioned by the Qing Emperor Shunzhi to host the visit of the Fifth Dalai Lama to Beijing. Since then, this temple has hosted the 13th Dalai Lama as well as the Sixth, Ninth and Tenth Panchen Lamas.

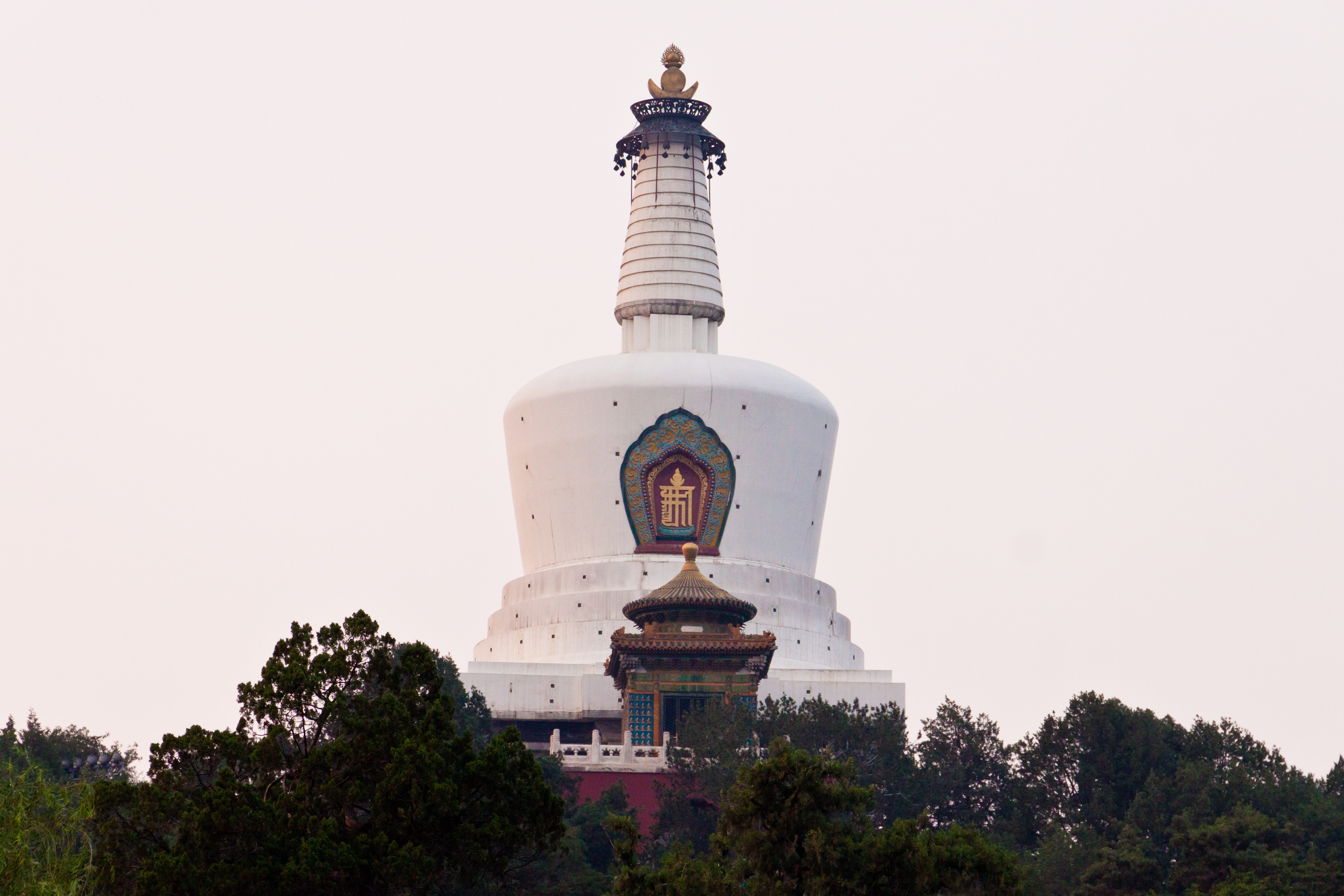
The White Pagoda of Miaoying Temple

The largest Tibetan Buddhist Temple in Beijing is the Yonghe Temple, which was decreed by the Qing Emperor Qianlong in 1744 to serve as the residence and research facility for his Buddhist preceptor of Rölpé Dorjé the third Changkya (or living Buddha of Inner Mongolia). The Yonghe Temple is so-named because it was the childhood residence of the Yongzheng Emperor, and retains the glazed tiles reserved for imperial palaces. While the "High-level Tibetan Buddhism College of China", China's highest institution college of Tibetan Buddhism, situated near the Yonghe Temple. The Lingguang Temple of Badachu in the Western Hills also dates to the Tang dynasty. The temple's Zhaoxian Pagoda (招仙塔) was first built in 1071 during the Liao dynasty to hold a tooth relic of the Buddha. The pagoda was destroyed during the Boxer Rebellion and the tooth was discovered from its foundation. A new pagoda was built in 1964. The six aforementioned temples: Guangji, Guanghua, Tongjiao, Xihuang, Yonghe and Lingguang have been designated National Key Buddhist Temples in Han Chinese Area.

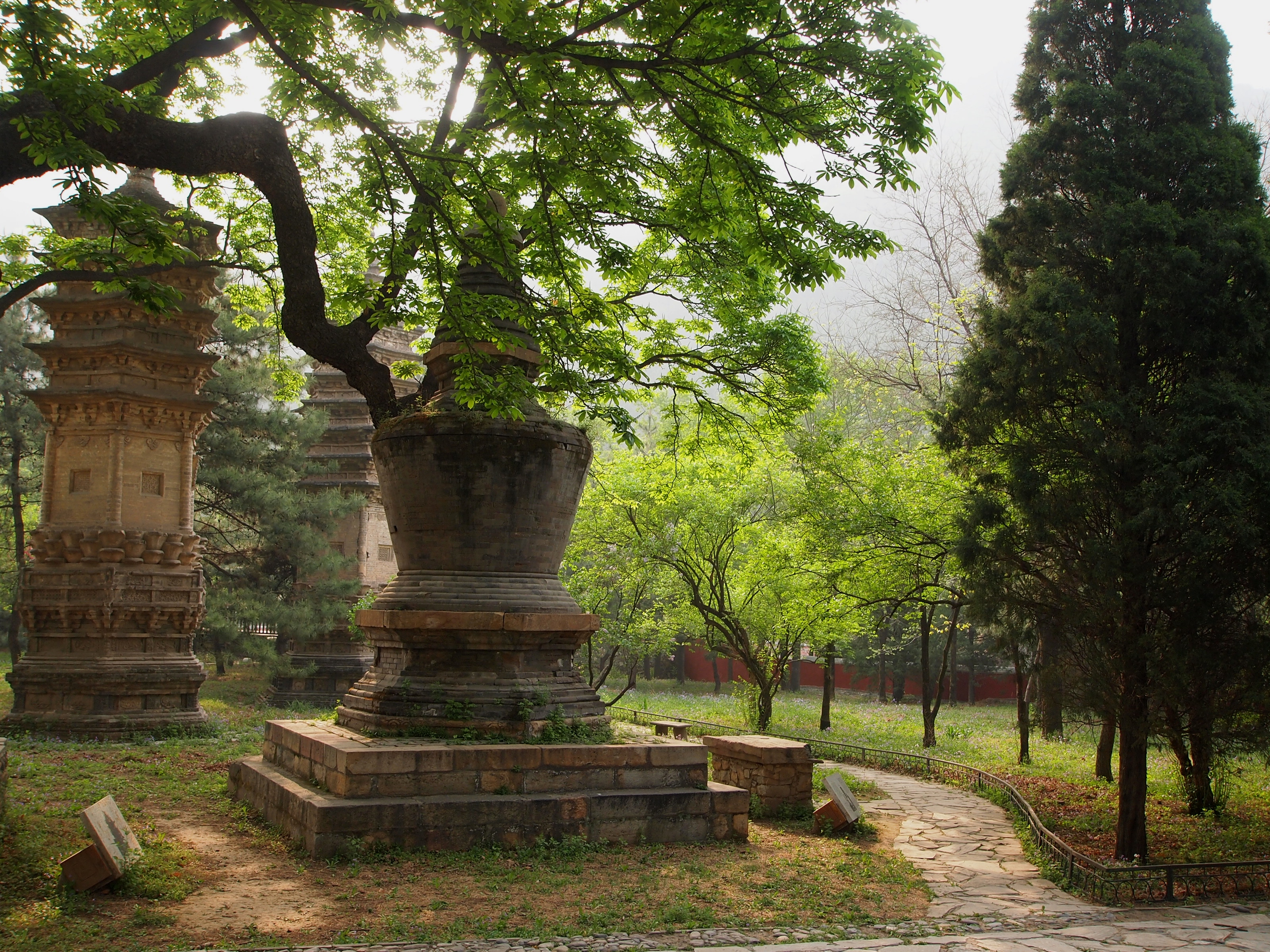
The tomb pagodas at Tanzhe Temple

In addition, other notable temples in Beijing include the Tanzhe Temple (founded in the Jin dynasty (266–420) is the oldest in the municipality), the Tianning Temple (oldest pagoda in the city), the Miaoying Temple (a Yuan-era white pagoda), the Wanshou Temple (home to the Beijing Art Museum) and the Big Bell Temple (Dazhong Temple).

==== Islam ====
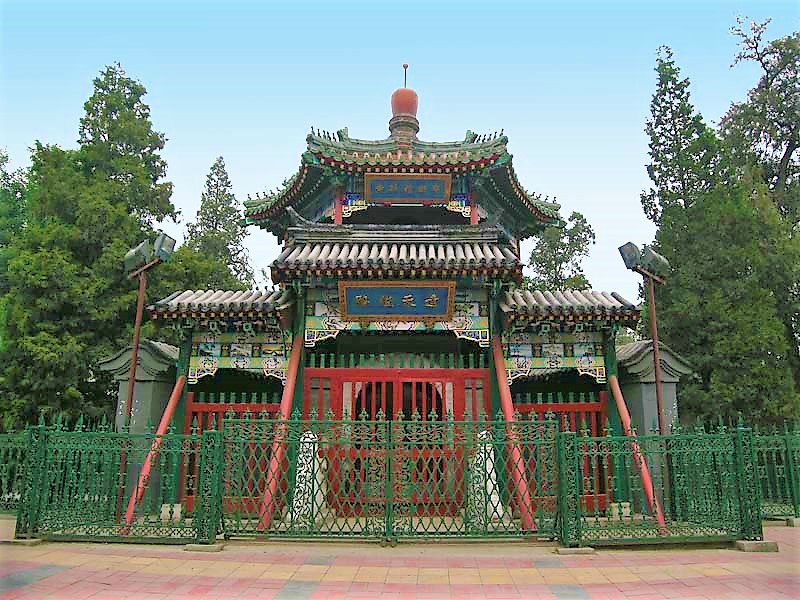
Niujie Mosque

Beijing has about 70 mosques recognized by the Islamic Association of China, whose headquarters are located next to the Niujie Mosque, the oldest mosque in the city. The Niujie Mosque was founded in 996 during the Liao dynasty and is frequently visited by Muslim dignitaries. The Chinese Muslim community reportedly celebrated Ramadan and made Eid prayers at the mosque in 2021.

The largest mosque in Beijing is Changying mosque, located in Chaoyang district, with an area of 8,400 square meters.

Other notable mosques in the old city include the Dongsi Mosque, founded in 1346; the Huashi Mosque, founded in 1415; Nan Douya Mosque, near Chaoyangmen; Jinshifang Street Mosque, in Xicheng District; and the Dongzhimen Mosque. There are large mosques in outlying Muslim communities in Haidian, Madian, Tongzhou, Changping, Changying, Shijingshan and Miyun. The China Islamic Institute is located in the Niujie neighborhood in Xicheng District.

==== Christianity ====
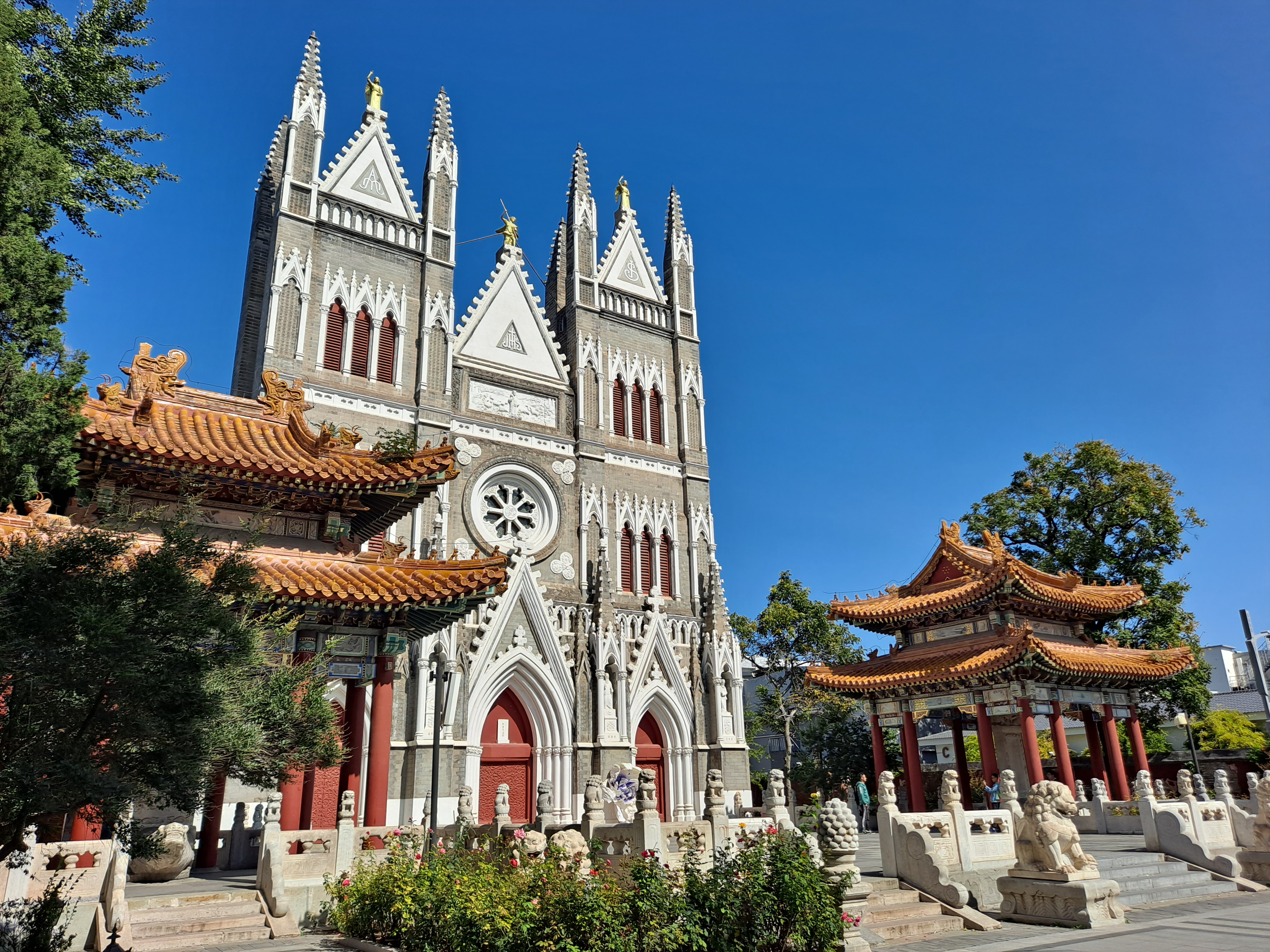
Church of the Saviour, also known as the Xishiku Church, built in 1703

===== Catholicism =====
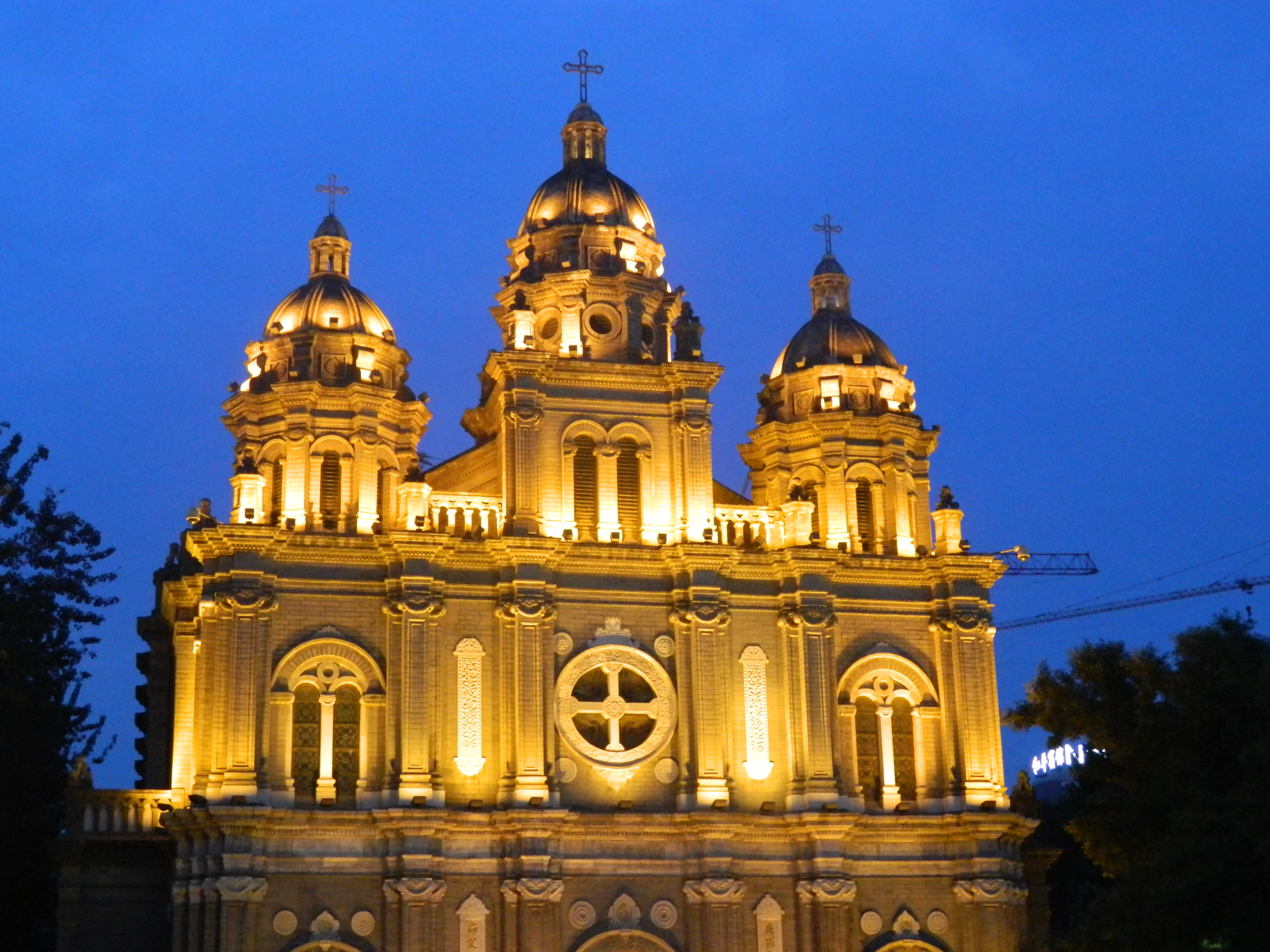
St. Joseph's Church

In 1289, John of Montecorvino came to Beijing as a Franciscan missionary with the order from the Pope. After meeting and receiving the support of Kublai Khan in 1293, he built the first Catholic church in Beijing in 1305. The Chinese Patriotic Catholic Association (CPCA), based in Houhai is the government oversight body for Catholics in mainland China. Notable Catholic churches in Beijing include:

- the Nantang or Cathedral of the Immaculate Conception also known as the Xuanwumen Church, which was founded in 1605 and whose current archbishop, Joseph Li Shan, is one of the few bishops in China to have the support of both the Vatican and the CPCA.
- the Dongtang or St. Joseph's Church, better known as the Wangfujing Church, founded in 1653.
- the Beitang or Church of the Saviour, also known as the Xishiku Church, founded in 1703.
- the Xitang or Church of Our Lady of Mount Carmel also known as the Xizhimen Church, founded in 1723.

The National Seminary of Catholic Church in China is located in Daxing District.

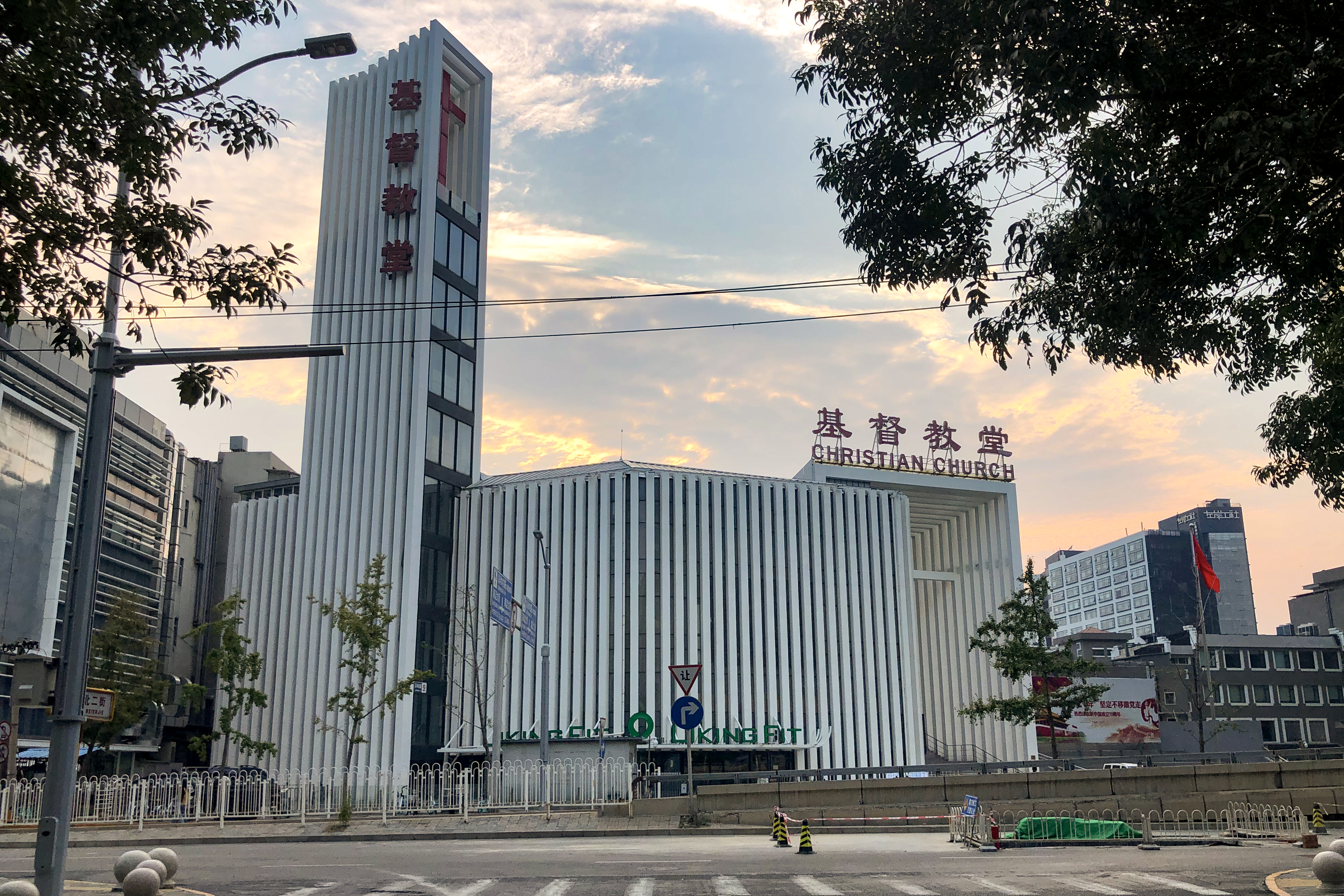
Haidian Christian Church

===== Protestantism =====
The earliest Protestant churches in Beijing were founded by British and American missionaries in the second half of the 19th century. Protestant missionaries also opened schools, universities and hospitals which have become important civic institutions. Most of Beijing's Protestant churches were destroyed during the Boxer Rebellion and afterwards rebuilt. In 1958, the 64 Protestant churches in the city are reorganized into four and overseen by the state through the Three-Self Patriotic Movement.

===== Eastern Orthodox =====
There was a significant amount of Orthodox Christians in Beijing. Orthodoxy came to Beijing with Russian prisoners from the Sino-Russian border conflicts of the 17th century. In 1956, Viktor, the bishop of Beijing returned to the Soviet Union, and the Soviet embassy took over the old cathedral and demolished it. In 2007, the Russian embassy built a new church in its garden to serve the Russian Orthodox Christians in Beijing.

=== Media ===
==== Television and radio ====
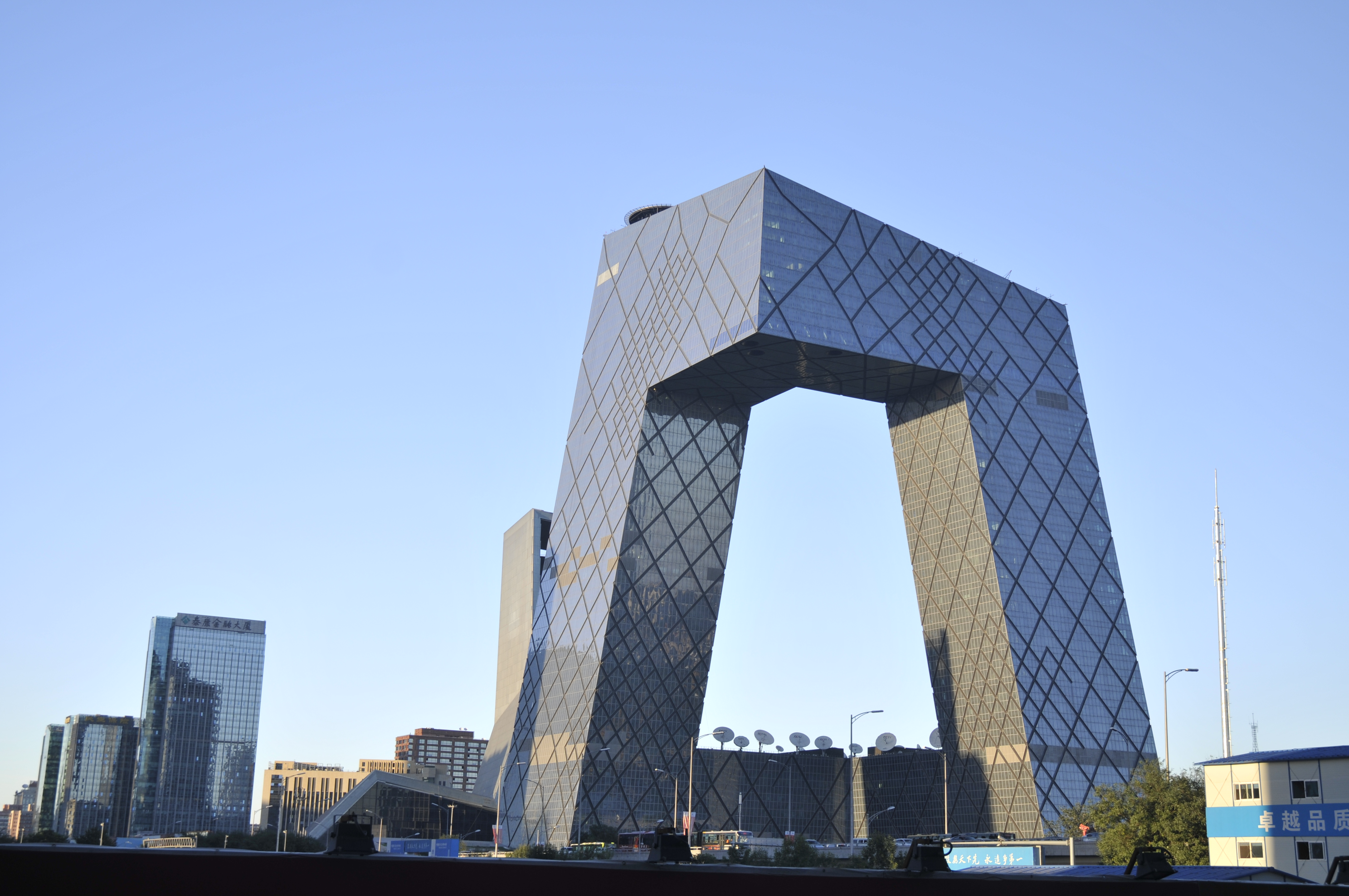
The China Central Television Headquarters building in the Beijing CBD

Beijing Television broadcasts on channels 1 through 10, and China Central Television, China's largest television network, maintains its headquarters in Beijing. Three radio stations feature programmes in English: Hit FM on FM 88.7, Easy FM by China Radio International on FM 91.5, and the newly launched Radio 774 on AM 774. Beijing Radio Stations is the family of radio stations serving the city.

==== Press ====
The well-known Beijing Evening News, covering news about Beijing in Chinese, is distributed every afternoon. Other newspapers include Beijing Daily, The Beijing News, the Beijing Star Daily, the Beijing Morning News, and the Beijing Youth Daily, as well as English-language weeklies Beijing Weekend and Beijing Today. The People's Daily, Global Times and the China Daily (English) are published in Beijing as well.

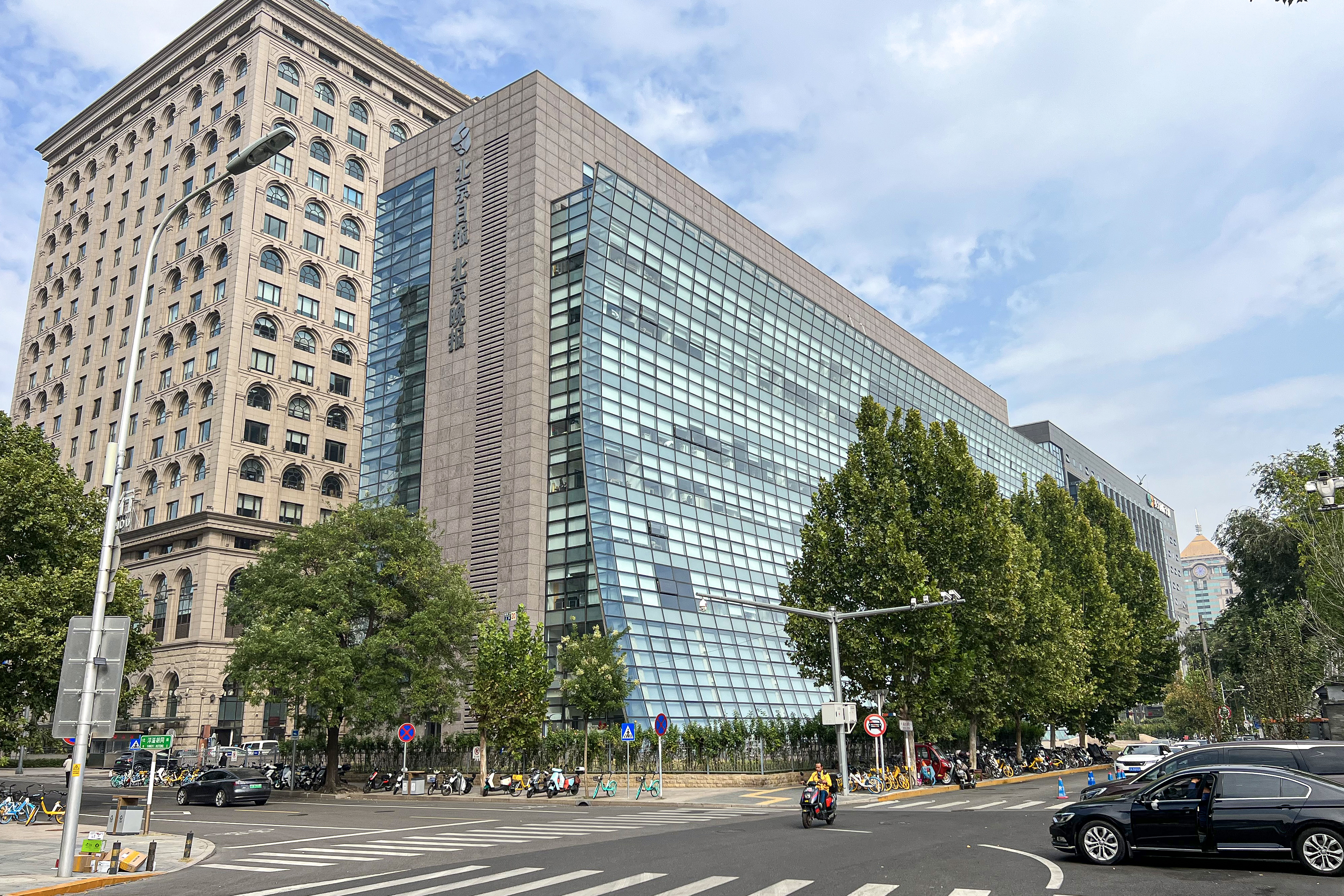
Beijing Daily headquarters

Publications primarily aimed at international visitors and the expatriate community include the English-language periodicals Time Out Beijing, Beijing This Month, Beijing Talk, That's Beijing, and The Beijinger.

==== Beijing rock ====
Beijing rock (Chinese: 北京摇滚) is a wide variety of rock and roll music made by rock bands and solo artists from Beijing. The first rock band in Beijing was Peking All-Stars, which was formed in 1979 by foreigners.

Rock bands and solo artists from Beijing include Cui Jian, Dou Wei, He Yong, Pu Shu, Tang Dynasty, Black Panther, The Flowers, 43 Baojia Street, etc.

== Sports ==
=== Events ===
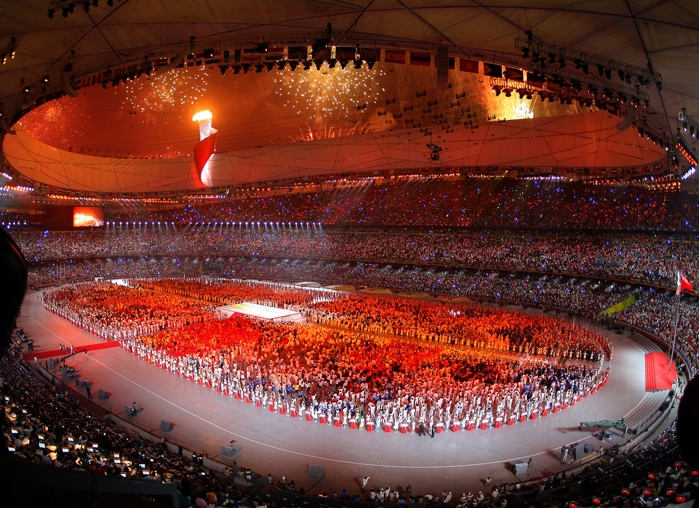
A scene from the opening ceremonies of the 2008 Summer Olympic Games

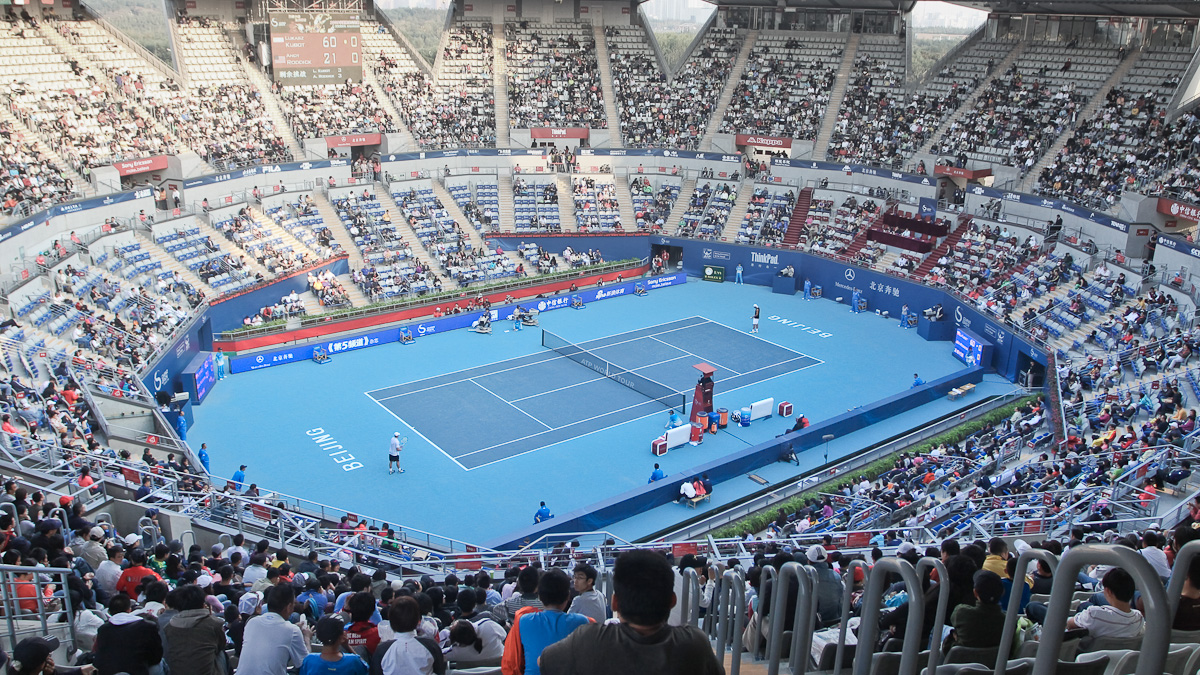
China Open in 2009

Beijing has hosted numerous international and national sporting events, the most notables was the 2008 Summer Olympic and Paralympic Games and the 2022 Winter Olympics and the Paralympics. Other multisport international events held in Beijing include the 2001 Summer Universiade and the 1990 Asian Games. Single-sport international competitions include the Beijing Marathon (annually since 1981), China Open of Tennis (1993–97, annually since 2004), ISU Grand Prix of Figure Skating Cup of China (2003, 2004, 2005, 2008, 2009 and 2010), World Professional Billiards and Snooker Association China Open for Snooker (annually since 2005), Union Cycliste Internationale Tour of Beijing (since 2011), 1961 World Table Tennis Championships, 1987 IBF Badminton World Championships, the 2004 AFC Asian Cup (football), and 2009 Barclays Asia Trophy (football). Beijing hosted the 2015 IAAF World Championships in Athletics.

Beijing's LeSports Center is one of the main venues for the 2019 FIBA Basketball World Cup.

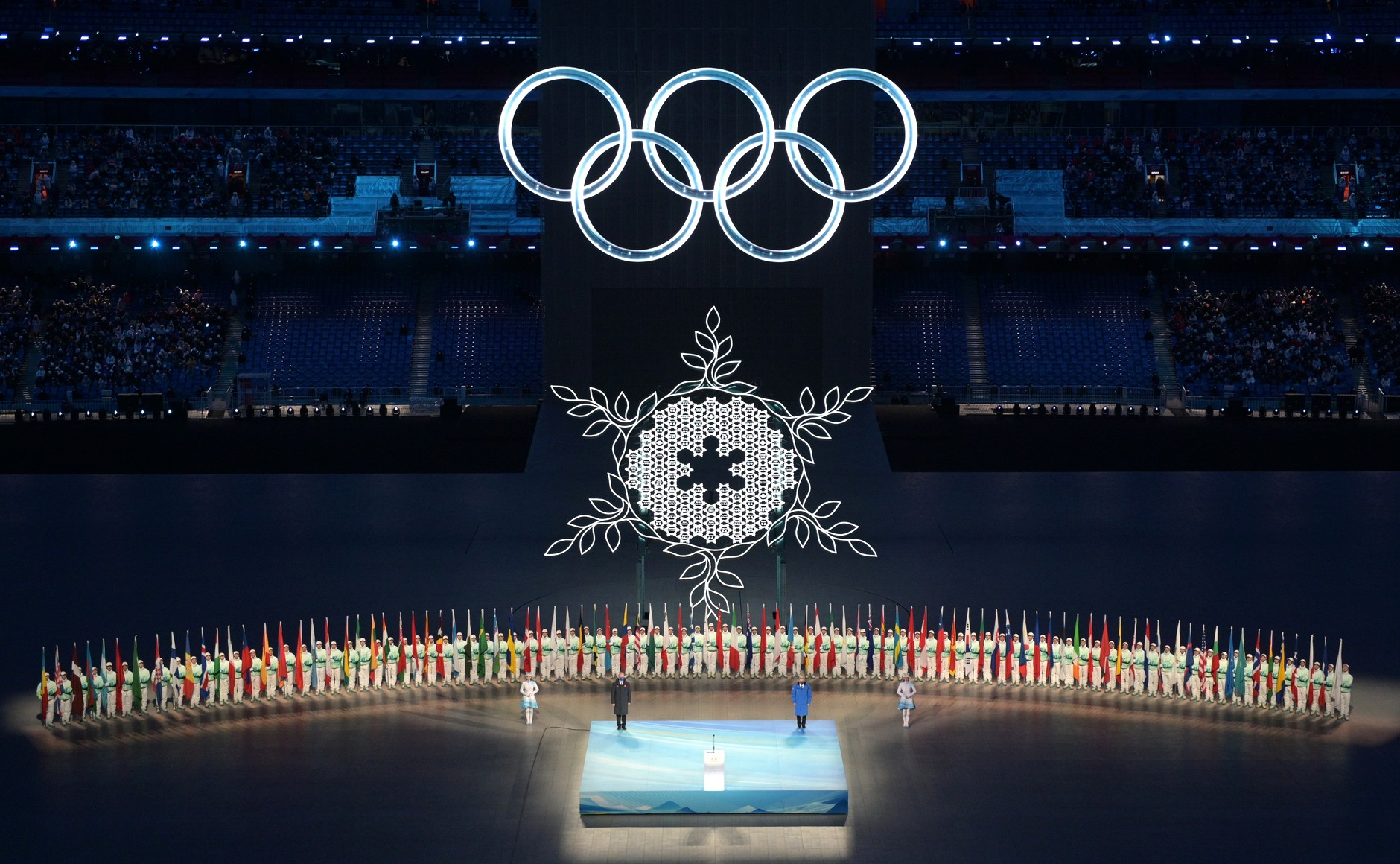
The opening ceremony of the 2022 Beijing Winter Olympics

The city hosted the second Chinese National Games in 1914 and the first four National Games of China in 1959, 1965, 1975, 1979, respectively, and co-hosted the 1993 National Games with Sichuan and Qingdao. Beijing also hosted the inaugural National Peasants' Games in 1988 and the sixth National Minority Games in 1999.

In November 2013, Beijing made a bid to host the 2022 Winter Olympics. On 31 July 2015, the International Olympic Committee awarded the 2022 Winter Olympics to the city becoming the first ever to host both Summer and Winter Olympics also for the 2022 Winter Paralympics becoming the first ever to host both Summer and Winter Paralympics.

=== Venues ===
Major sporting venues in the city include the MasterCard Center at Wukesong west of downtown; the Workers' Stadium and Workers' Arena in Sanlitun just east of downtown and the Capital Arena in Baishiqiao, northeast of downtown. In addition, many universities in the city have their own sport facilities. The Olympic Green is a stadium cluster centered on the National Stadium. It was originally developed for the 2008 Summer Olympics and modified for the 2022 Winter Olympics. The Big Air Shougang ski jump is in the western suburbs and was built for the 2022 Winter Olympics.

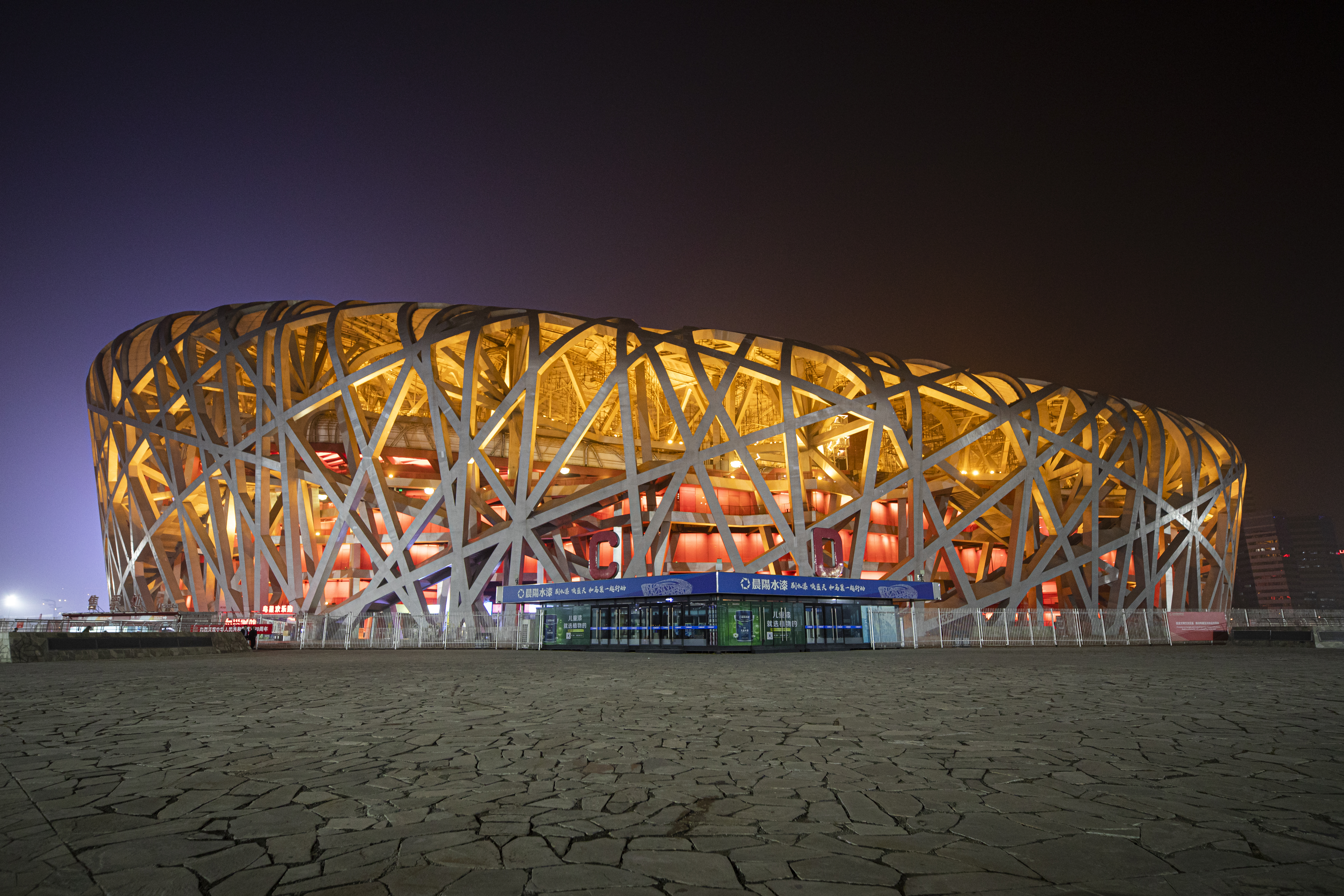
Beijing National Stadium "Bird's Nest"

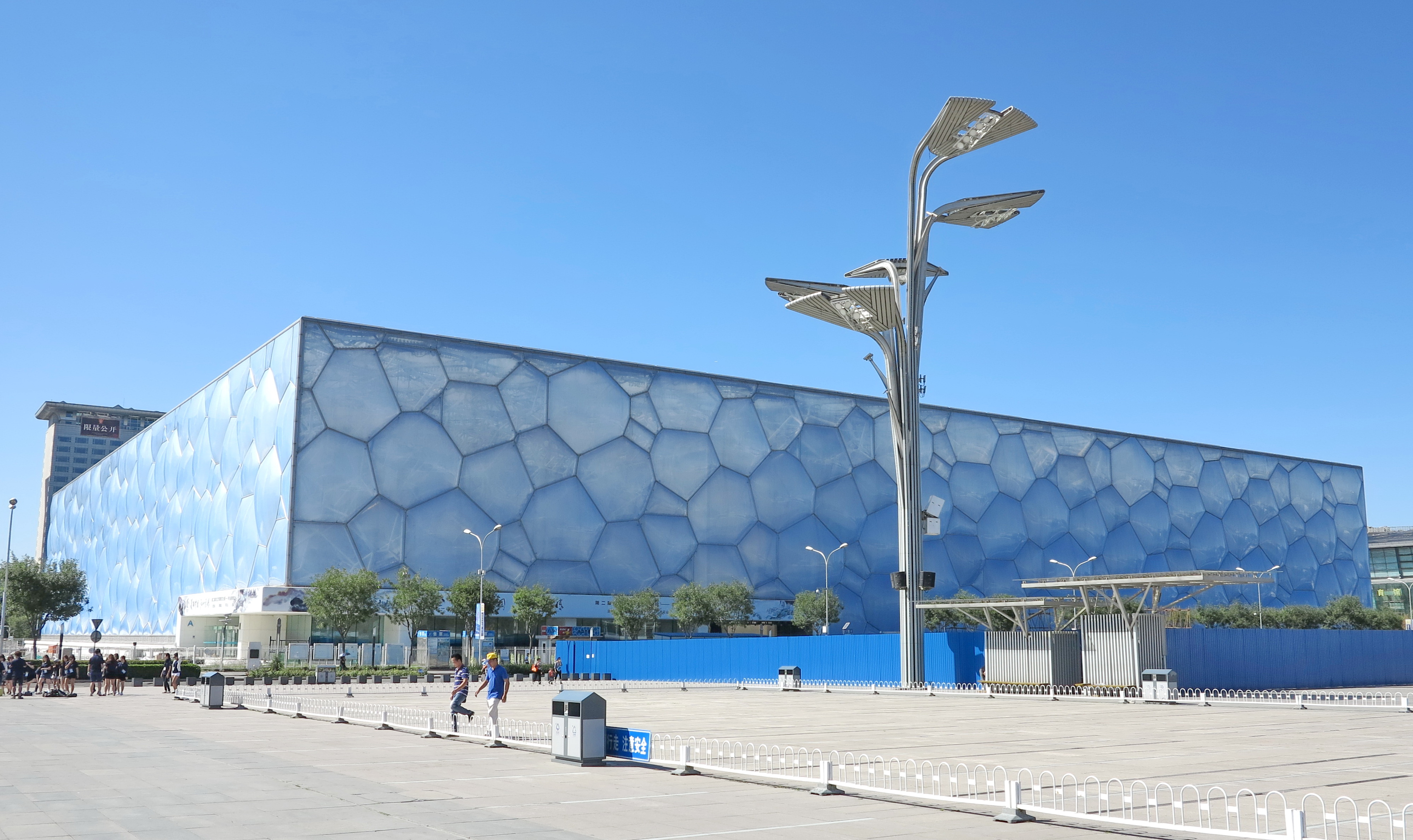
Water Cube

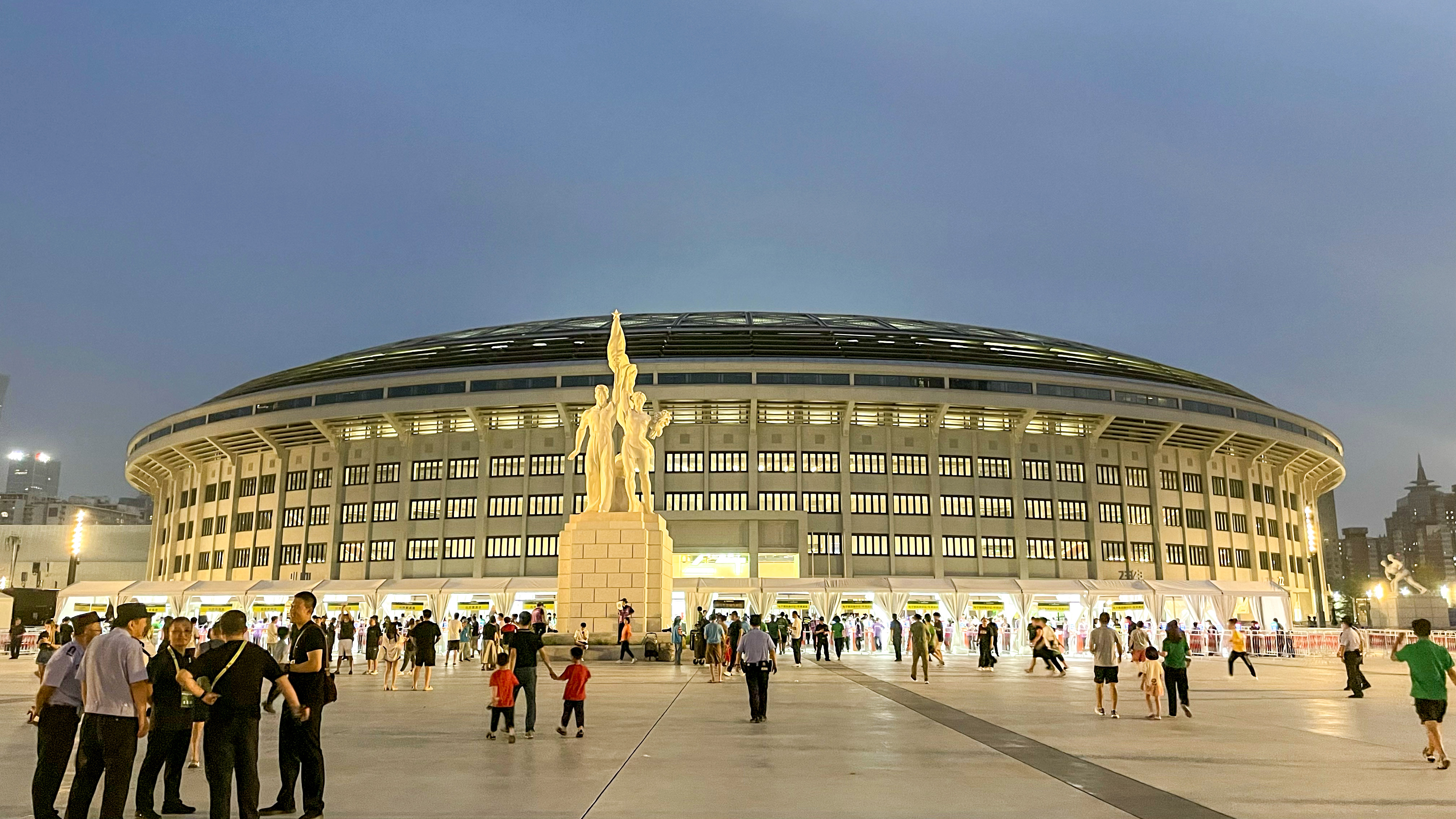
Beijing Workers' Stadium

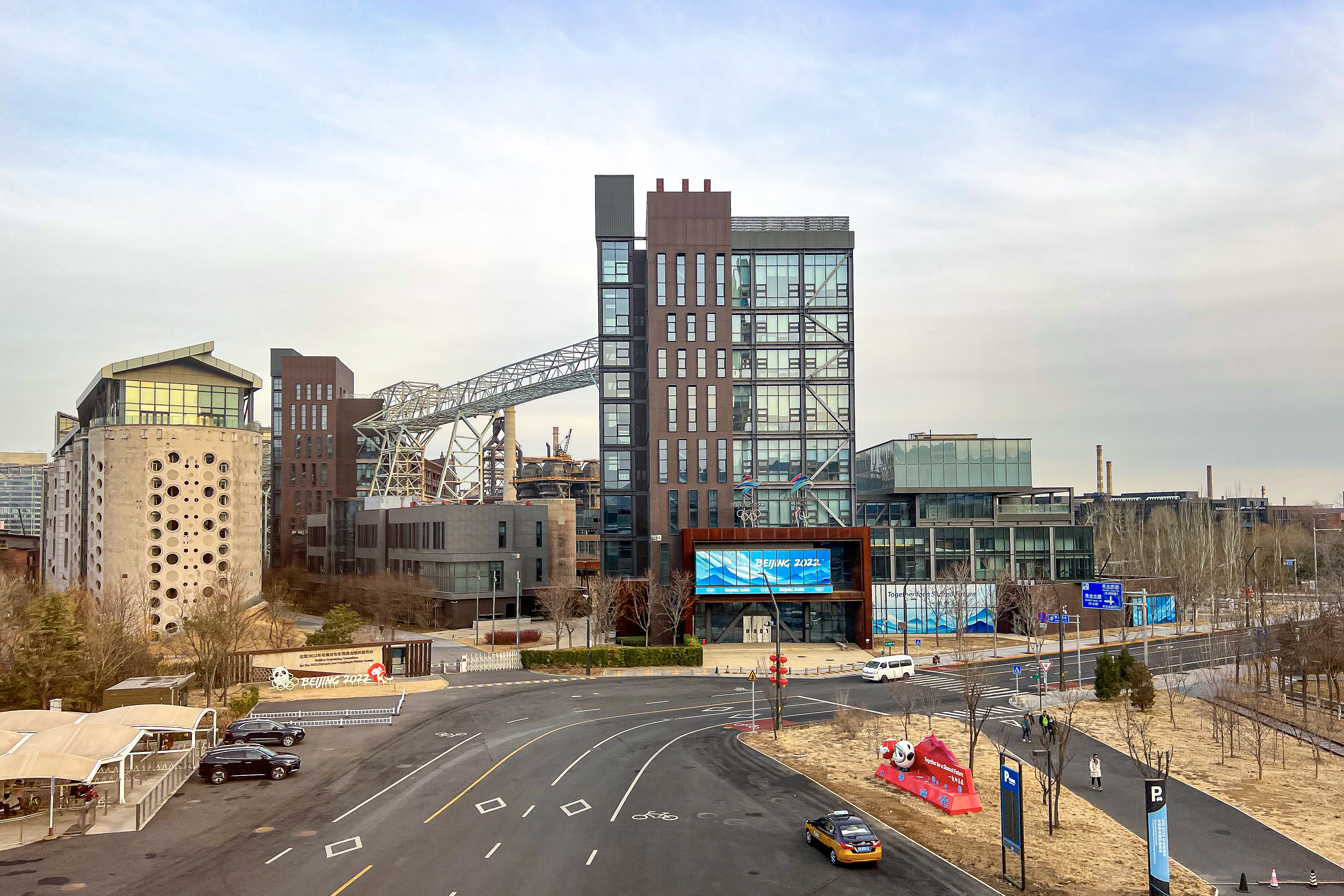
Beijing Organising Committee for the 2022 Winter Olympics

=== Clubs ===
Professional sports teams based in Beijing include:

- China Baseball League
  - Beijing Tigers
- Chinese Basketball Association
  - Beijing Ducks
  - Beijing Royal Fighters
- Women's Chinese Basketball Association
  - Beijing Shougang
- Kontinental Hockey League
  - HC Kunlun Red Star
- Chinese Super League
  - Beijing Guoan
- China League Two
  - Beijing BIT
- Chinese Women's National League
  - Beijing BG Phoenix

The Beijing Olympians of the American Basketball Association, formerly a Chinese Basketball Association team, kept their name and maintained a roster of primarily Chinese players after moving to Maywood, California in 2005.

China Bandy Federation is based in Beijing, one of several cities in which the potential for bandy development is explored.

== Transportation ==
Beijing is an important transport hub in North China with six ring roads, 1167 km (725 miles) of expressways, 15 National Highways, nine conventional railways, and six high-speed railways converging on the city.

=== Rail and high-speed rail ===
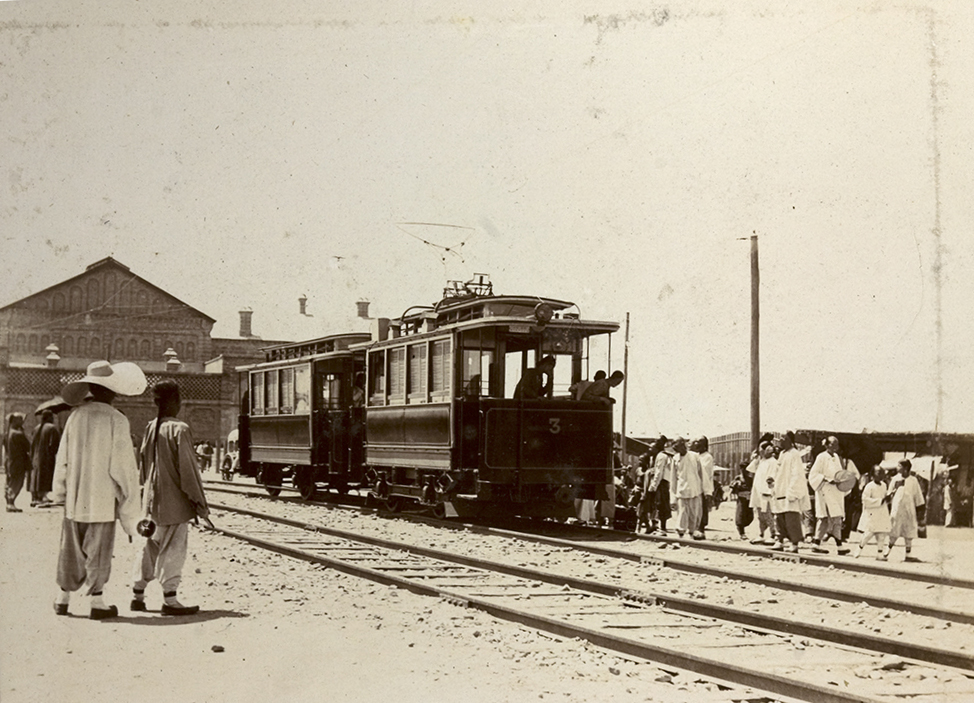
Tramway at Machiapu Station, 1900

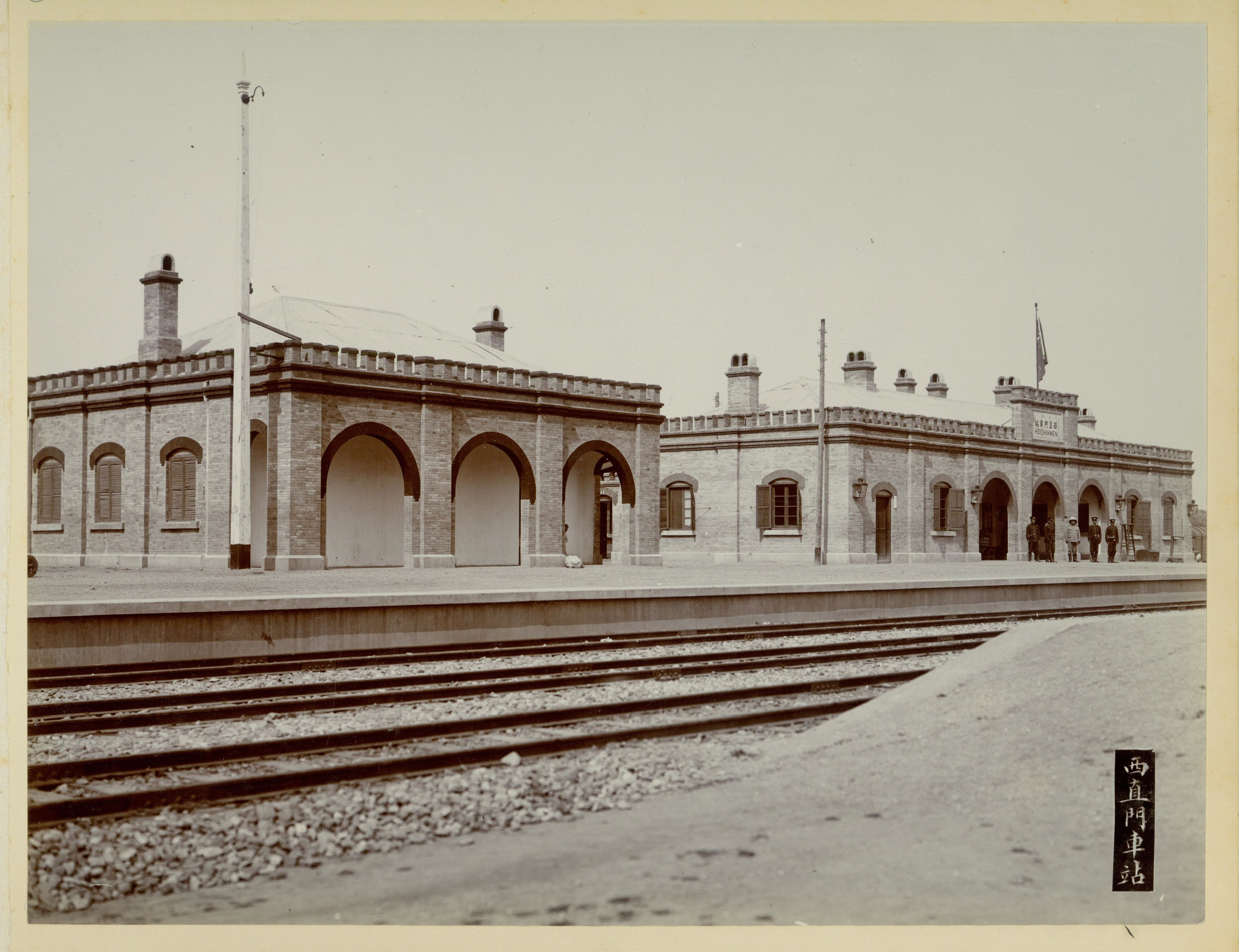
Xizhi Gate station of the Jingzhang Railway, c. 1909

Beijing serves as a large rail hub in China's railway network. Ten conventional rail lines radiate from the city to: Shanghai (Jinghu Line), Guangzhou (Jingguang Line), Kowloon (Jingjiu Line), Harbin (Jingha Line) (including Qinhuangdao (Jingqin Line)), Baotou (Jingbao Line), Chengde (Jingcheng Line), Tongliao, Inner Mongolia (Jingtong Line), Yuanping, Shanxi (Jingyuan Line) and Shacheng, Hebei (Fengsha Line). In addition, the Datong–Qinhuangdao railway passes through the municipality to the north of the city.

Beijing also has six high-speed rail lines: the Beijing–Tianjin intercity railway, which opened in 2008; the Beijing–Shanghai high-speed railway, which opened in 2011; the Beijing–Guangzhou high-speed railway, which opened in 2012; and the Beijing–Xiong'an intercity railway and the Beijing–Zhangjiakou intercity railway, both of which opened in 2019. The Beijing–Shenyang high-speed railway was completed in 2021.

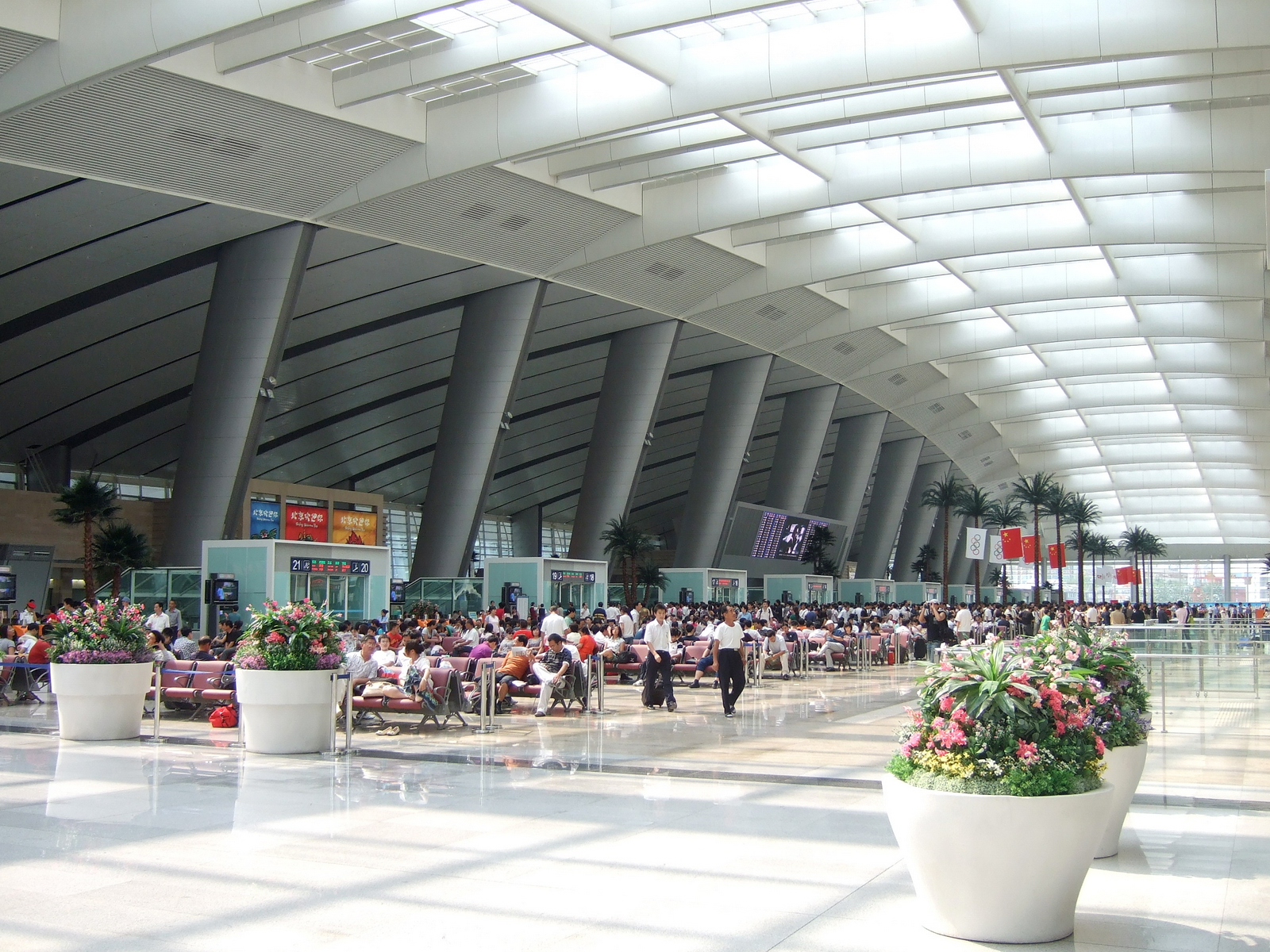
Beijing South railway station, one of several in the city

The city's main railway stations are the Beijing railway station, which opened in 1959; the Beijing West railway station, which opened in 1996; and the Beijing South railway station, which was rebuilt into the city's high-speed railway station in 2008; The Beijing North railway station, was first built in 1905 and expanded in 2009; The Qinghe railway station, was first built in 1905 and expanded in 2019; The Beijing Chaoyang railway station opened in 2021; The Beijing Fengtai railway station opened in 2022; and the Beijing Tongzhou railway station opened in 2025.

Smaller stations in the city including Beijing East railway station and Daxing Airport station handle mainly commuter passenger traffic. In outlying suburbs and counties of Beijing, there are over 40 railway stations.

From Beijing, direct passenger train service is available to most large cities in China. International train service is available to Mongolia, Russia, Vietnam and North Korea. Passenger trains in China are numbered according to their direction in relation to Beijing.

=== Roads and expressways ===
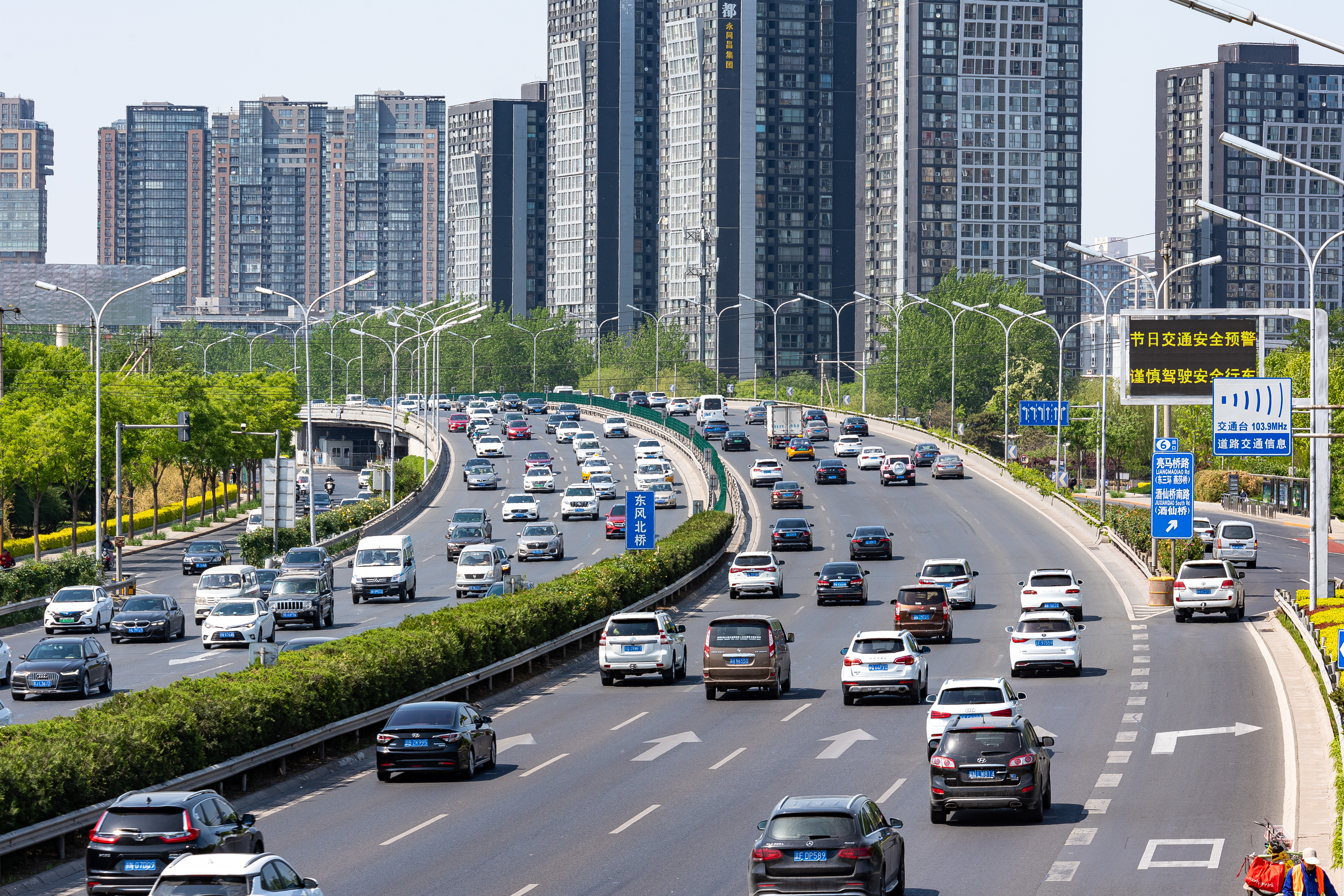
View of 4th Ring Road in Chaoyang District

Beijing is connected by road links to all parts of China as part of the National Trunk Road Network. Many expressways of China serve Beijing, as do 15 China National Highways. Beijing's urban transport is dependent upon the ring roads that concentrically surround the city, with the Forbidden City area marked as the geographical center for the ring roads. The ring roads appear more rectangular than ring-shaped. There is no official "1st Ring Road". The 2nd Ring Road is located in the inner city. Ring roads tend to resemble expressways progressively as they extend outwards, with the 5th and 6th Ring Roads being full-standard national expressways, linked to other roads only by interchanges. Expressways to other regions of China are generally accessible from the 3rd Ring Road outward. A final outer orbital, the Capital Area Loop Expressway (G95), was fully opened in 2018 and will extend into neighboring Tianjin and Hebei.

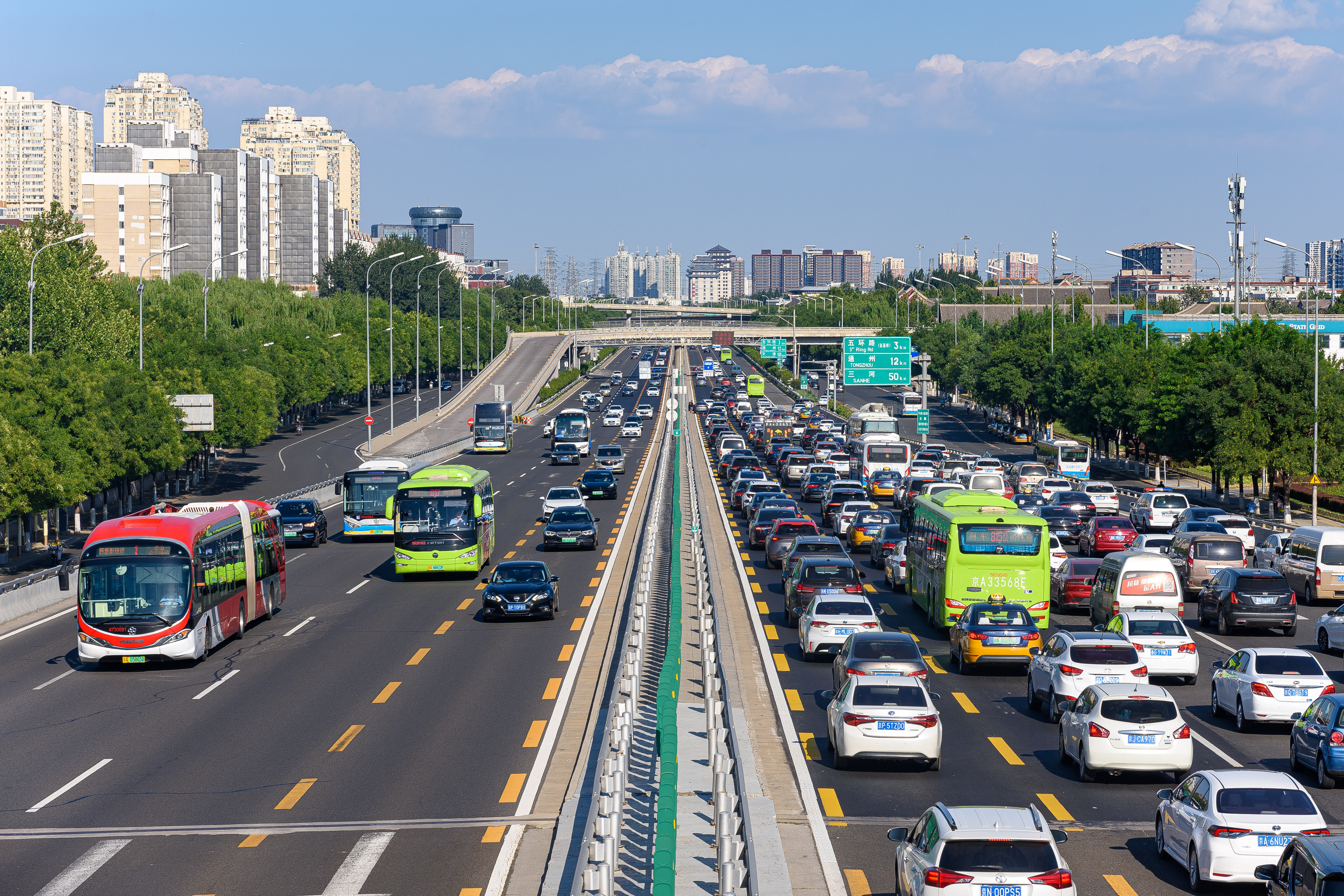
Beijing–Tongzhou Expressway

Within the urban core, city streets generally follow the checkerboard pattern of the ancient capital. Many of Beijing's boulevards and streets with "inner" and "outer" are still named in relation to gates in the city wall, though most gates no longer stand. Traffic jams are a major concern. Even outside of rush hour, several roads still remain clogged with traffic.

Beijing's urban design layout further exacerbates transportation problems. The authorities have introduced several bus lanes, which only public buses can use during rush hour. In the beginning of 2010, Beijing had 4 million registered automobiles. By the end of 2010, the government forecast 5 million. In 2010, new car registrations in Beijing averaged 15,500 per week.

Towards the end of 2010, the city government announced a series of drastic measures to tackle traffic jams, including limiting the number of new license plates issued to passenger cars to 20,000 a month and barring cars with non-Beijing plates from entering areas within the Fifth Ring Road during rush hour. More restrictive measures are also reserved during major events or heavily polluted weather.

To obtain a valid license plate, Beijing drivers must be selected in a lottery. As part of government policy support for the use of electric vehicles, Beijing drivers with fully electric cars have a much greater chance of being selected for a license plate. Additionally, fully electric vehicles are exempt from restrictions on which day of the week a driver may drive their vehicle.

Road signs began to be standardized with both Chinese and English names displayed, with location names using pinyin, in 2008.

=== Air ===
==== Beijing Capital International Airport ====
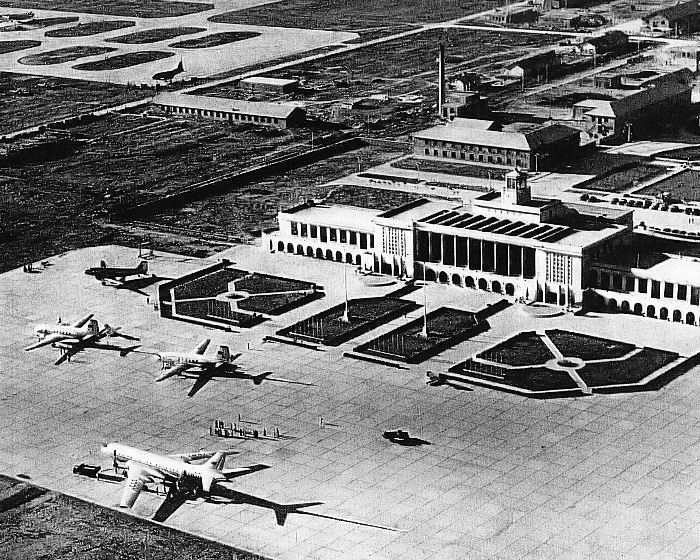
Beijing Capital International Airport in 1959

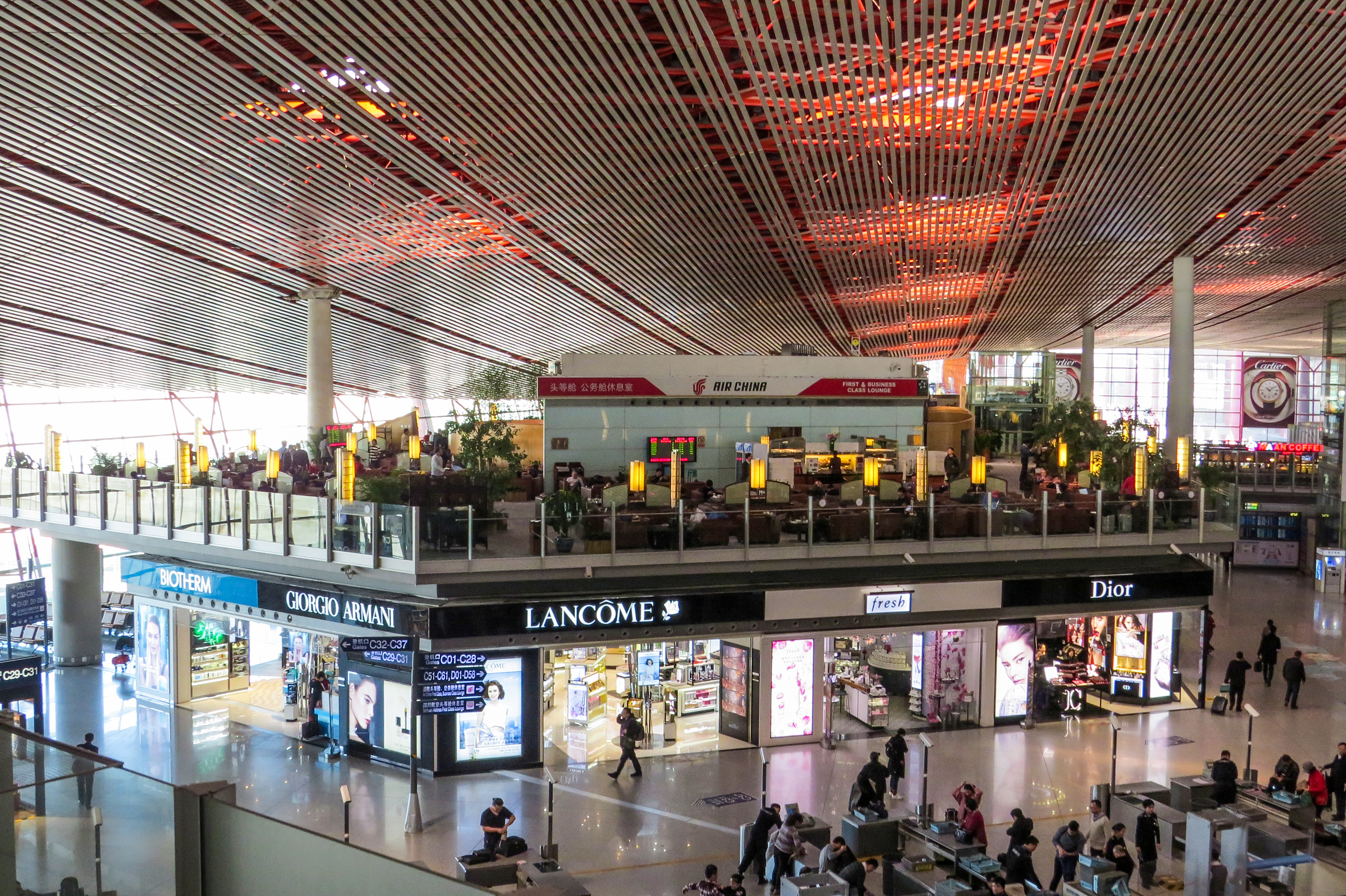
Terminal 3 of the Beijing Capital International Airport

Beijing has two of the world's largest airports. The Beijing Capital International Airport (IATA: PEK), located 32 kilometres (20 mi) northeast of central Beijing in Chaoyang District bordering Shunyi District, is the second busiest airport in the world after Atlanta's Hartsfield–Jackson International Airport. Capital Airport's Terminal 3, built during the expansion for the 2008 Olympics, is one of the largest in the world. Capital Airport is the main hub for Air China and Hainan Airlines. The Airport Expressway and Second Airport Expressway connects the airport to the northeast and east of the city center, respectively. Driving time from city center is about 40 minutes under normal traffic conditions. The Capital Airport Express line of Beijing Subway and the Capital Airport Bus serves the Beijing Capital International Airport.

==== Beijing Daxing International Airport ====
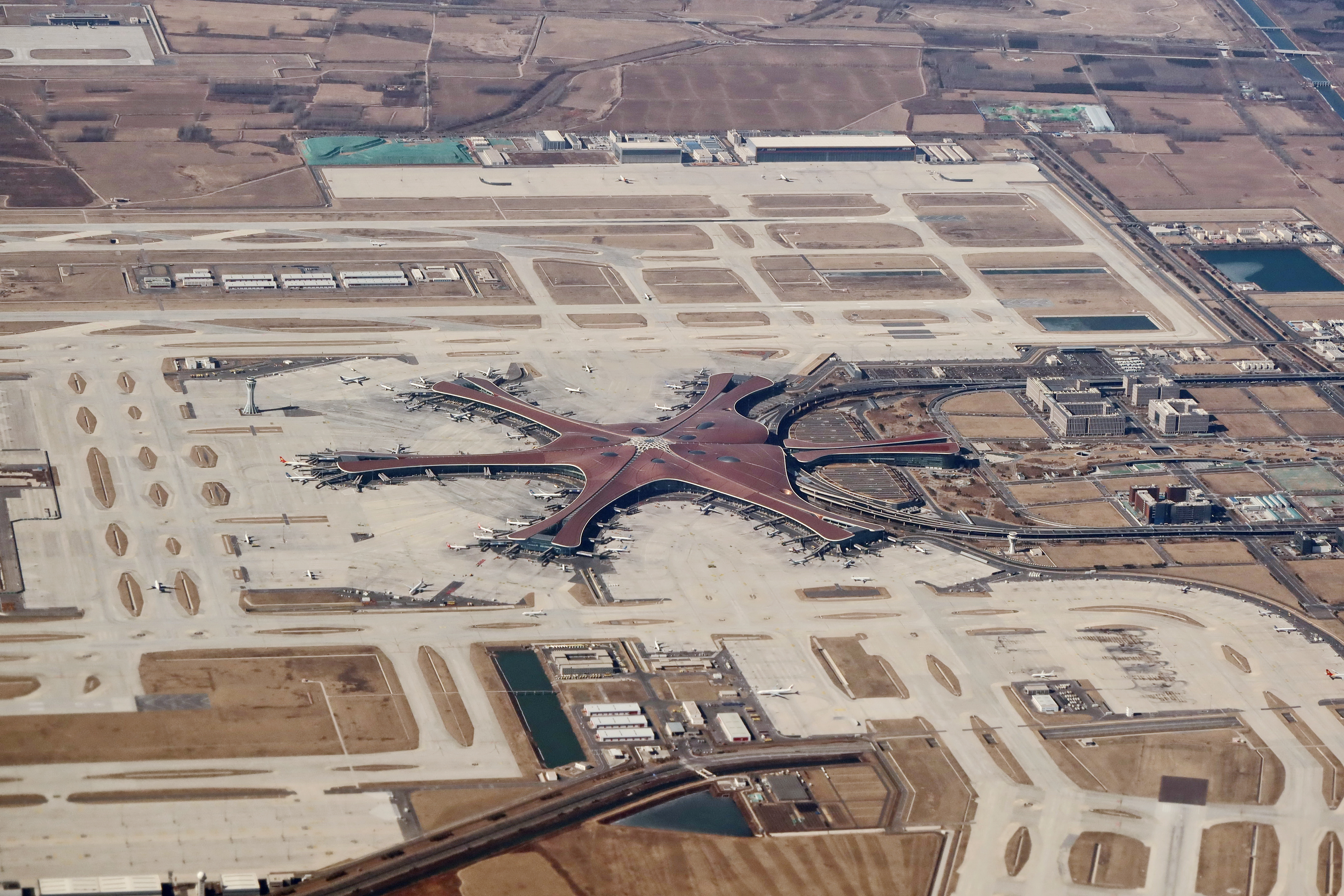
Beijing Daxing International Airport

The Beijing Daxing International Airport (IATA: PKX) located 46 kilometres (29 mi) south of the city in Daxing District bordering the city of Langfang, Hebei Province, opened on 25 September 2019. The Daxing Airport has one of the world's largest terminal buildings and is expected to be a major airport serving Beijing, Tianjin and northern Hebei Province. Daxing Airport is connected to the city via the Beijing–Xiong'an intercity railway, the Daxing Airport Express line of the Beijing Subway and two expressways.

==== Other airports ====
With the opening of the Daxing Airport in September 2019, the Beijing Nanyuan Airport (IATA: NAY), located 13 kilometres (8.1 mi) south of center in Fengtai District, has been closed to civilian airline service. Other airports in the city at Liangxiang, Xijiao, Shahe and Badaling are primarily for military use.

==== Visa requirements for air passengers ====
As of June 2026, visitors from 53 countries are permitted a 240-hour visa-free transit visit in Beijing, where the 240 hours is calculated from midnight of the day after entry and visitors are only permitted to stay within Beijing. Nationals from 50 countries are also permitted a 30-day visa-free stay in China.

=== Public transit ===
Map of Beijing Subway

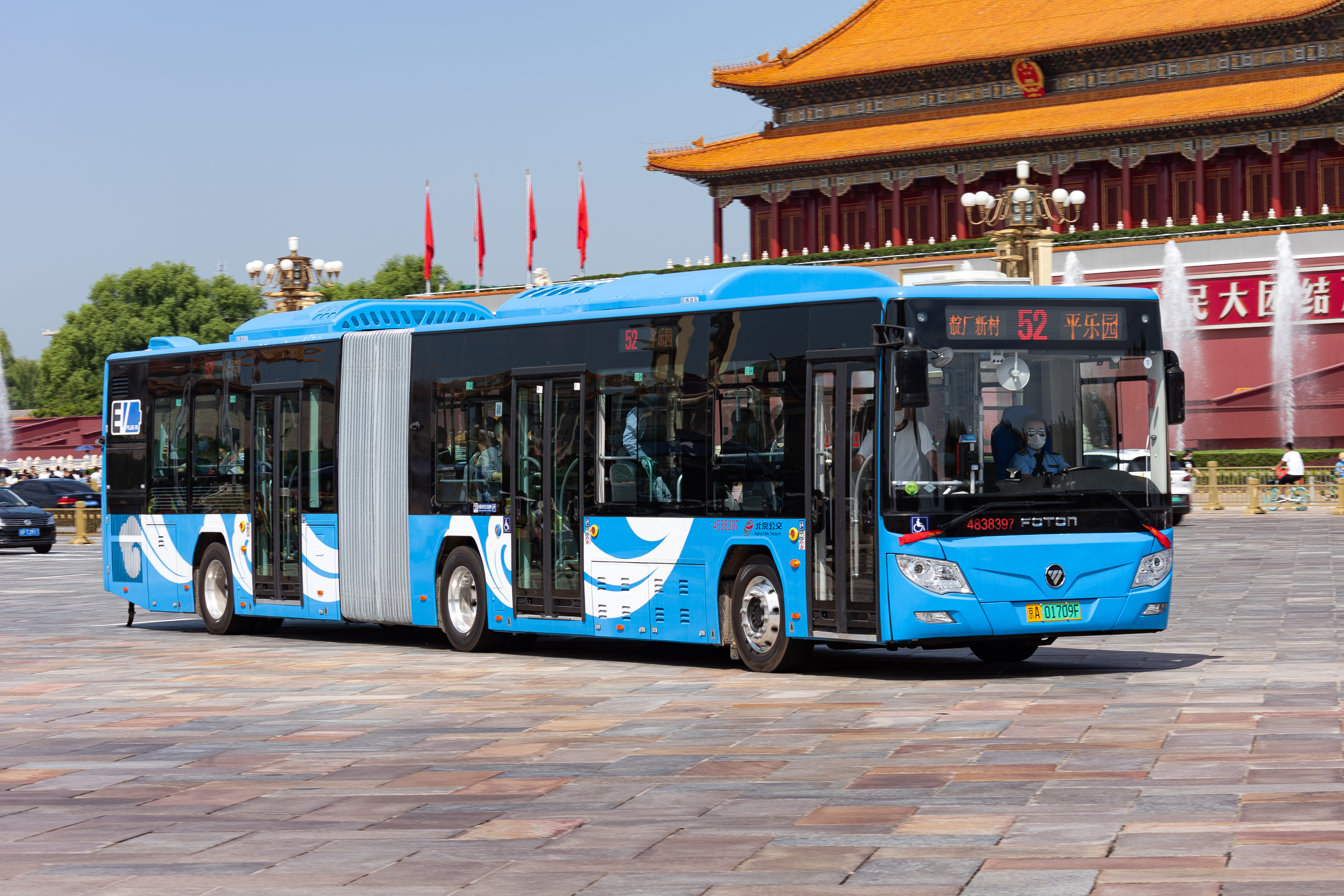
An articulated Beijing bus

The Beijing Subway, which began operating in 1969, now has 25 lines, 459 stations, and 783 km (487 mi) of lines. It is the longest subway system in the world and first in annual ridership with 3.66 billion rides delivered in 2016. In 2013, with a flat fare of ¥2.00 (US$0.31) per ride with unlimited transfers on all lines except the Airport Express, the subway was also the most affordable rapid transit system in China. The subway is undergoing rapid expansion and is expected to reach 30 lines, 450 stations, 1,050 kilometres (650 mi) in length by 2022. When fully implemented, 95% of residents inside the Fourth Ring Road will be able to walk to a station in 15 minutes. The Beijing Suburban Railway provides commuter rail service to outlying suburbs of the municipality.

As part of the urban re-development for the 2008 Olympics, Beijing's subway system was significantly expanded. On 28 December 2014, it switched to a distance-based fare system from a fixed fare for all lines except the Airport Express. Under the new system a trip under 6 km (3 1/2 mi) will cost ¥3.00(US$0.49), an additional ¥1.00 will be added for the next 6 km (3 1/2 mi) and the next 10 km (6 mi) until the distance for the trip reaches 32 km (20 mi). For every 20 kilometres (12 miles) after the original 32 kilometres (20 miles) an additional ¥1.00 is added. For example, a 50-kilometre (31-mile) trip would cost ¥ 8.00.

There are nearly 1,000 public bus and trolleybus lines in the city, including four bus rapid transit lines. Standard bus fares are as low as ¥1.00 when purchased with the Yikatong metrocard.

=== Taxi ===
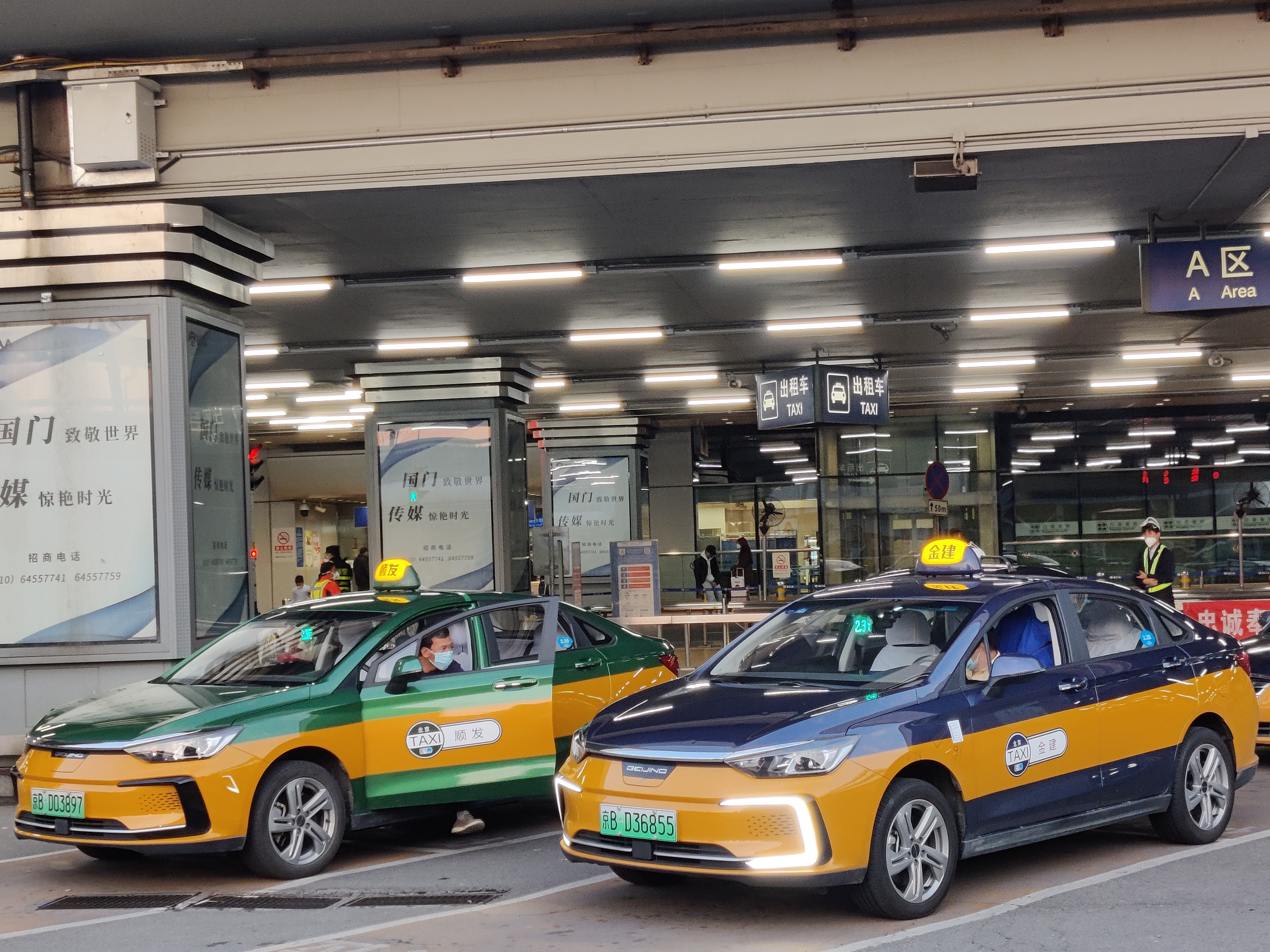
Beijing EU5 Taxi in Beijing

Metered taxi in Beijing start at ¥13 for the first 3 kilometres (1.9 mi), ¥2.3 Renminbi per additional 1 kilometre (0.62 mi) and ¥1 per ride fuel surcharge, not counting idling fees which are ¥2.3 (¥4.6 during rush hours of 7–9 am and 5–7 pm) per 5 minutes of standing or running at speeds lower than 12 kilometres per hour (7.5 mph). Most taxis are Hyundai Elantras, Hyundai Sonatas, Peugeots, Citroëns and Volkswagen Jettas. After 15 kilometres (9.3 mi), the base fare increases by 50% (but is only applied to the portion over that distance). Different companies have special colours combinations painted on their vehicles. Usually registered taxis have yellowish brown as basic hue, with another color of Prussian blue, hunter green, white, umber, tyrian purple, rufous, or sea green. Between 11 pm and 5 am, there is also a 20% fee increase. Rides over 15 km (9 mi) and between 23:00 and 06:00 incur both charges, for a total increase of 80%. Tolls during trip should be covered by customers and the costs of trips beyond Beijing city limits should be negotiated with the driver. The cost of unregistered taxis is also subject to negotiation with the driver.

=== Bicycles ===
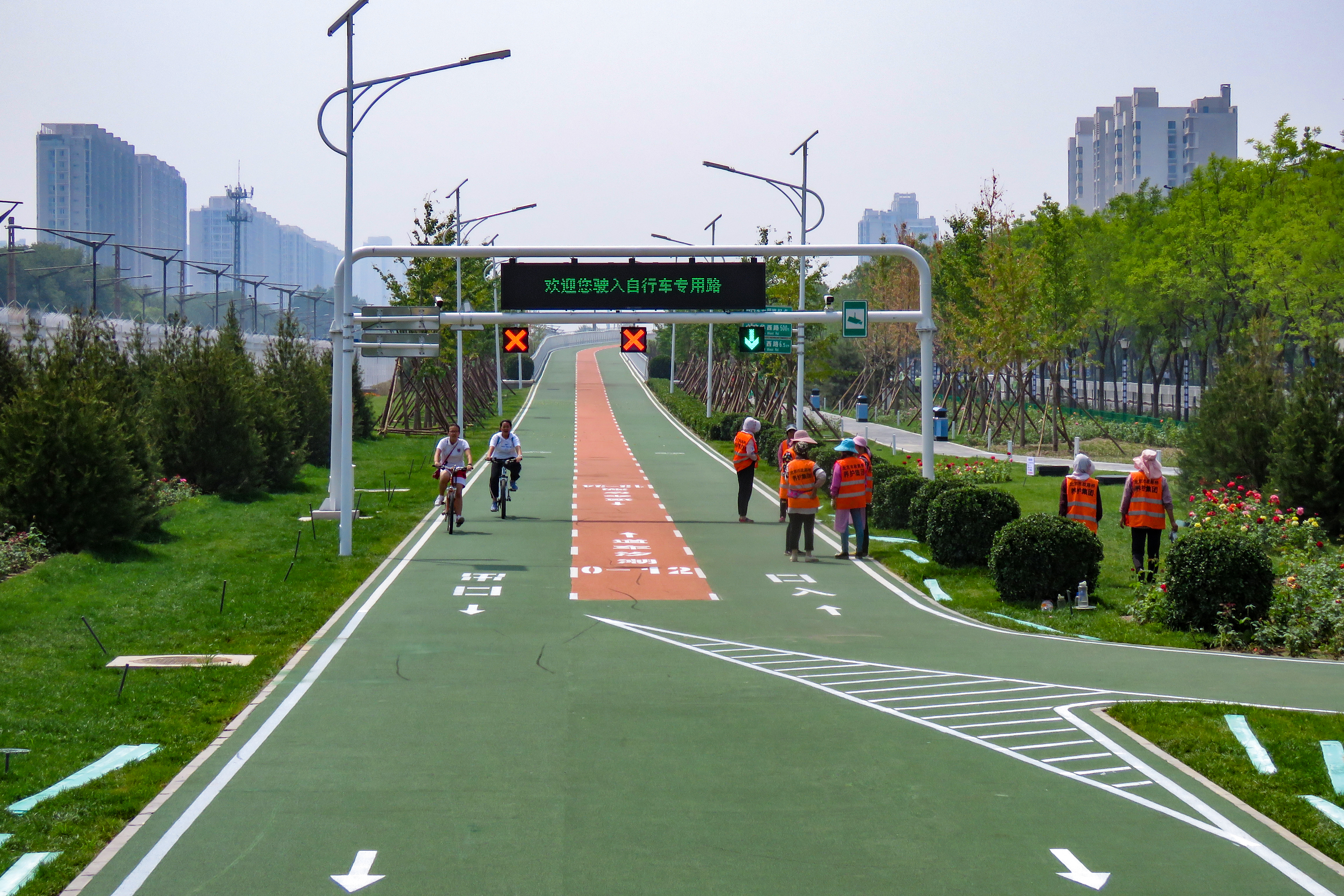
Huilongguan–Shangdi bicycle lane

Beijing has long been well known for the number of bicycles on its streets. Although the rise of motor traffic has created a great deal of congestion and bicycle use has declined, bicycles are still an important form of local transportation. Many cyclists can be seen on most roads in the city, and most of the main roads have dedicated bicycle lanes. Beijing is relatively flat, which makes cycling convenient. The rise of electric bicycles and electric scooters, which have similar speeds and use the same cycle lanes, may have brought about a revival in bicycle-speed two-wheeled transport. It is possible to cycle to most parts of the city. Because of the growing traffic congestion, the authorities have indicated more than once that they wish to encourage cycling, but it is not clear whether there is sufficient will to translate that into action on a significant scale. On 30 March 2019, a 6.5 km (4 mile) bicycle-dedicated lane was opened, easing the traffic congestion between Huilongguan and Shangdi where there are many high-tech companies. Cycling has seen a resurgence in popularity spurred by the emergence of a large number of dockless app based bikeshares such as Mobike, Bluegogo and Ofo since 2016.

== Defence and aerospace ==
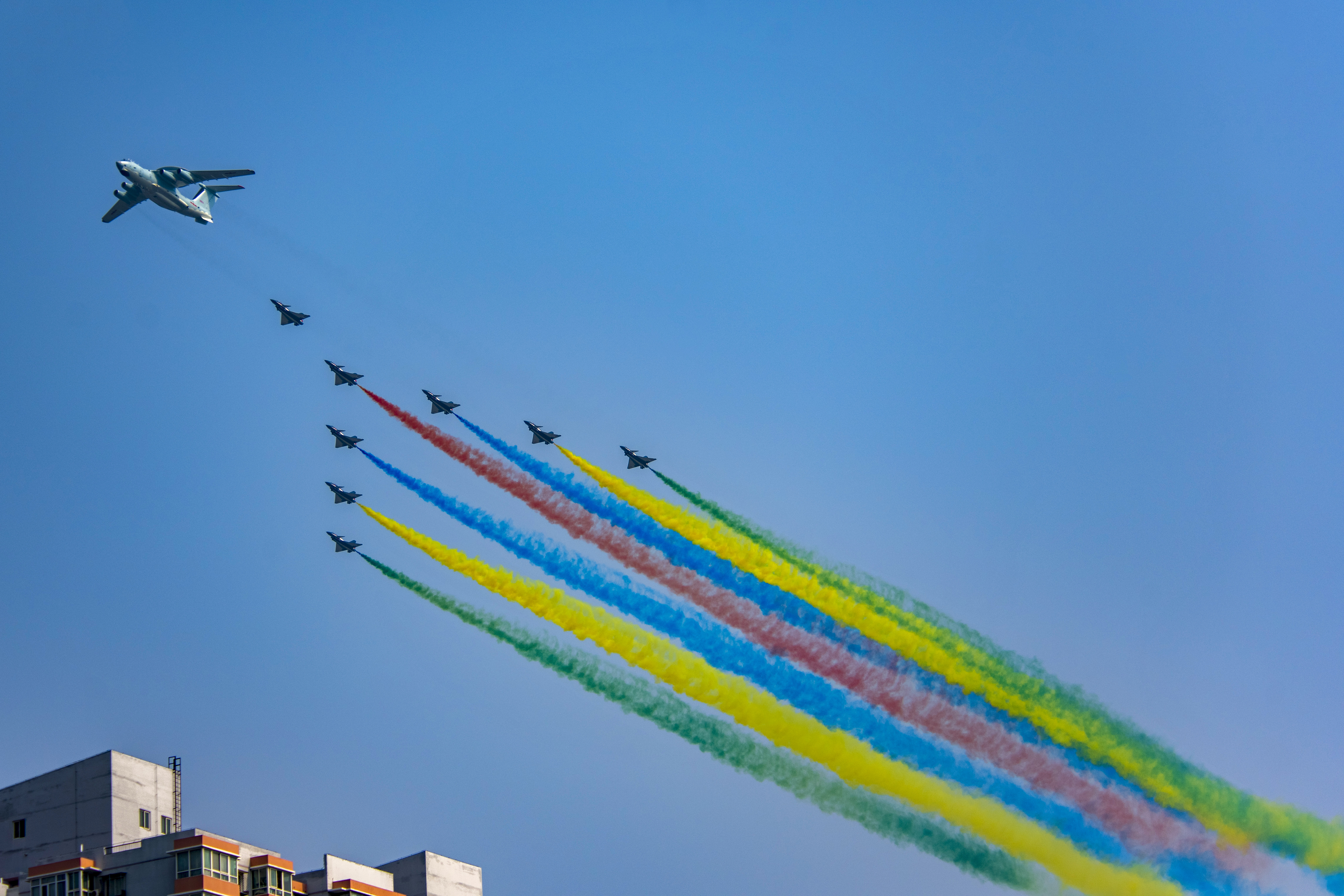
KJ-2000 and J-10s started the flypast formation for the 70th anniversary of the People's Republic of China.

The command headquarters of China's military forces are based in Beijing. The Central Military Commission, the political organ in charge of the military, is housed inside the Ministry of National Defense, located next to the Military Museum of the Chinese People's Revolution in western Beijing. The Rocket Force, which controls the country's strategic missile and nuclear weapons, has its command in Qinghe, Haidian District. The headquarters of the Central Theater Command, one of five nationally, is based further west in Gaojing. The CTR oversees the Beijing Capital Garrison as well as the 81st, 82nd and 83rd Armies, which are based in Hebei.

Military institutions in Beijing also include academies and think tanks such as the PLA National Defence University and Academy of Military Science, military hospitals such as the 301, 307 and the Academy of Military Medical Sciences, and army-affiliated cultural entities such as 1 August Film Studios and the PLA Song and Dance Troupe.

The China National Space Administration, which oversees country's space program, and several space-related state owned companies, such as CASTC and CASIC, are all based in Beijing. The Beijing Aerospace Command and Control Center, in Haidian District, tracks the country's crewed and uncrewed flight and other space exploration initiatives.

== Ecology ==
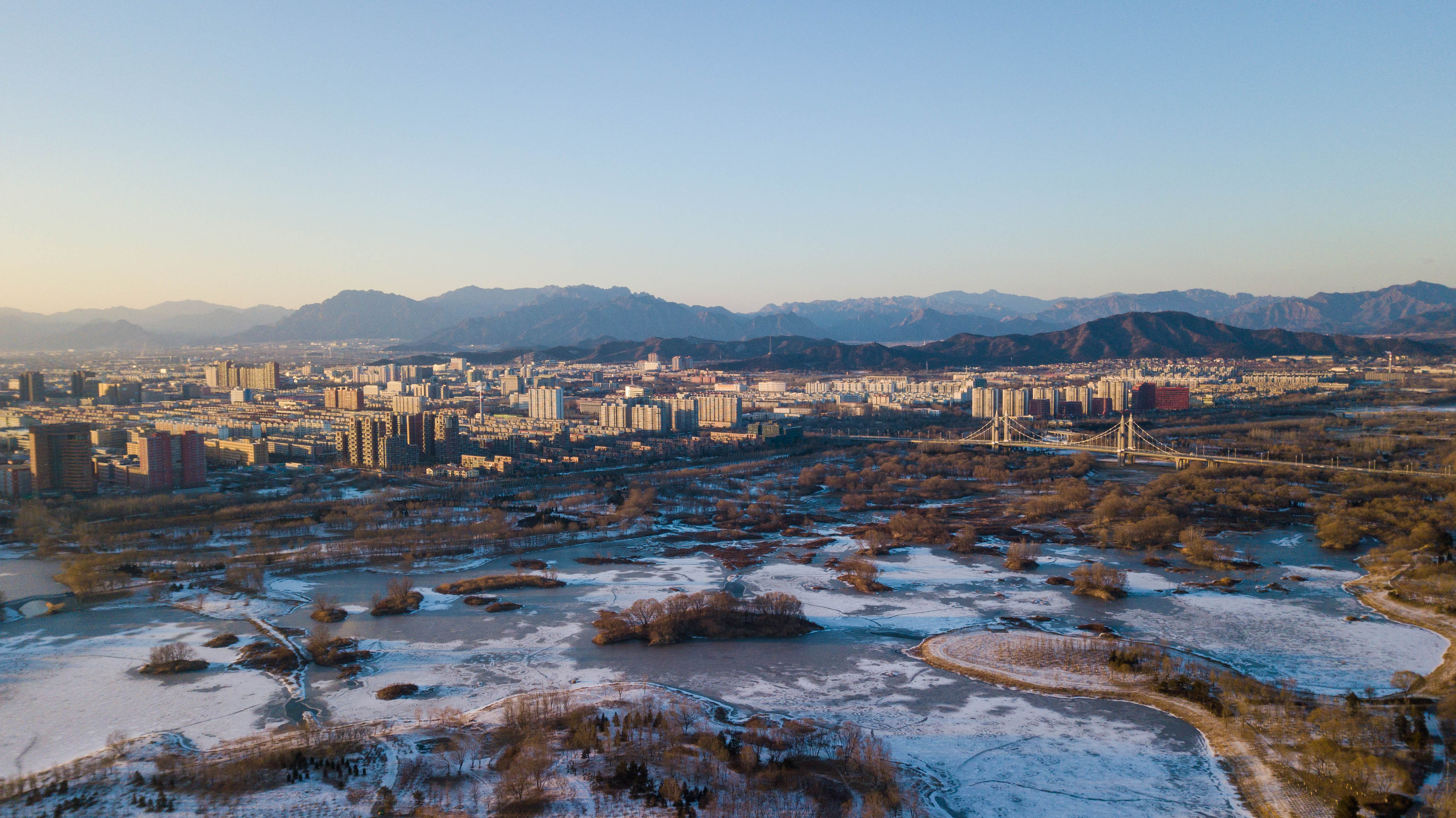
Wetland park in Changping District in winter

Beijing's municipal territory encompasses a diverse range of ecosystems, including montane forests in the west and north, plains, wetlands, and river valleys. As of 2022, the city had achieved a forest coverage rate of 44.8 percent and an urban green coverage rate of 49.3 percent. Forest coverage has expanded dramatically since 1949, when it stood at just 1.3 percent. A biodiversity survey conducted between 2020 and 2024 documented 7,121 species across multiple categories, including higher plants, vertebrates, insects, and macro fungi, within 151 natural and semi-natural ecosystem types. The city is home to 608 species of wild terrestrial vertebrates and 2,088 species of plants, and hosts 515 species of wild birds, an increase of nearly 100 species over the preceding decade. Among the capitals of G20 nations, Beijing ranks second in bird species diversity.

Beijing Municipality has 20 nature reserves, with a combined area of 1,339.7 km^{2} (517.3 sq mi). The mountains to the west and north of the city are home to a number of protected wildlife species including leopard, leopard cat, wolf, red fox, wild boar, masked palm civet, raccoon dog, hog badger, Siberian weasel, Amur hedgehog, roe deer, and mandarin rat snake. The Beijing Aquatic Wildlife Rescue and Conservation Center protects the Chinese giant salamander, Amur stickleback, and mandarin duck on the Huaijiu and Huaisha Rivers in Huairou District. To the south of the city, the Beijing Milu Park is home to one of the largest herds of Père David's deer, which are now extinct in the wild. Endemic to Beijing is the Beijing barbastelle, a species of vesper bat discovered in caves of Fangshan District in 2001 and identified as a distinct species in 2007. The mountains of Fangshan are also the natural habitat for the more common Beijing mouse-eared bat, large myotis, greater horseshoe bat, and Rickett's big-footed bat.

Each year, Beijing hosts 200–300 species of migratory birds including the common crane, black-headed gull, swan, mallard, common cuckoo, and the endangered yellow-breasted bunting. In May 2016, Common cuckoos nesting in the wetlands of Cuihu (Haidian), Hanshiqiao (Shunyi), Yeyahu (Yanqing) were tagged and have been traced as far as India, Kenya and Mozambique. In the fall of 2016, the Beijing Forest Police undertook a month-long campaign to crack down on illegal hunting and trapping of migratory birds for sale in local bird markets. Over 1,000 rescued birds of protected species including streptopelia, Eurasian siskin, crested myna, coal tit, and great tit were handed to the Beijing Wildlife Protection and Rescue Center for repatriation to the wild.

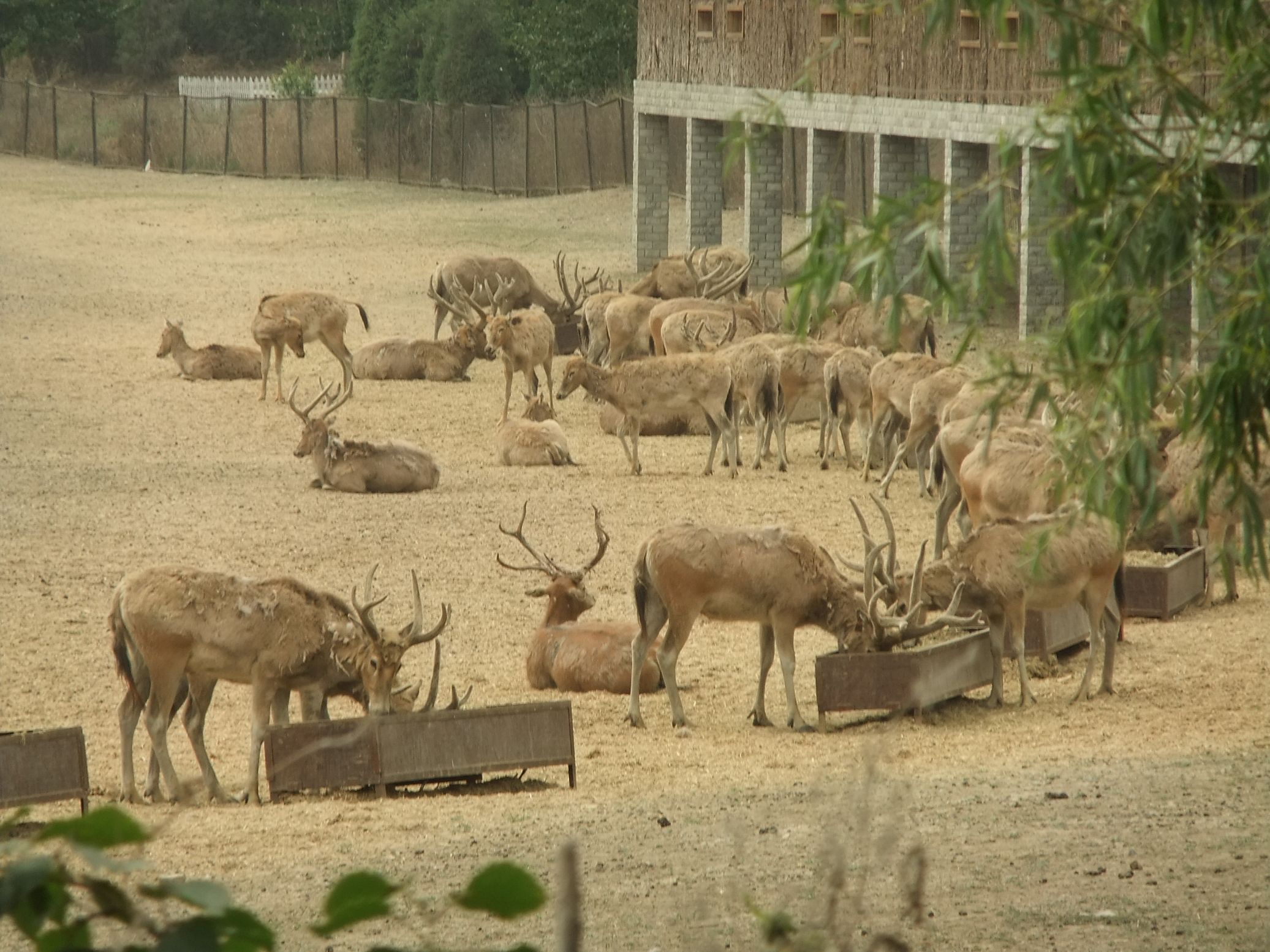
Père David's deer (Elaphurus davidianus) at Beijing Milu Park, Nanyuan.

Beijing has a particular historical association with Père David's deer (Elaphurus davidianus), a species known in Chinese as sibuxiang ("four-unlikes"), which survived extinction only because specimens from the imperial hunting park at Nanyuan were brought to Europe in the 19th century; the species was reintroduced to Beijing in 1985 after becoming extinct in China during the Boxer Rebellion of 1900.

The city flowers are the Chinese rose and chrysanthemum. The city trees are the Chinese arborvitae (an evergreen in the cypress family) and the pagoda tree (a deciduous tree in the bean family, also called the Chinese scholar tree). The oldest scholar tree in the city was planted in what is now Beihai Park during the Tang dynasty.

== International relations ==
The capital is the home of the Asian Infrastructure Investment Bank, a multilateral development bank that aims to improve economic and social outcomes in Asia and the Silk Road Fund, an investment fund of the Chinese government to foster increased investment and provide financial supports in countries along the One Belt, One Road. Beijing is also home to the headquarters of the Shanghai Cooperation Organisation (SCO), making it an important city for international diplomacy.

=== Twin towns and sister cities ===
Beijing is twinned with the following regions, cities, and counties:

- Addis Ababa, Ethiopia
- Ankara, Turkey
- Astana, Kazakhstan
- Athens, Greece
- Bangkok, Thailand
- Berlin, Germany
- Brussels, Belgium
- Bucharest, Romania
- Budapest, Hungary
- Buenos Aires, Argentina
- Cairo, Egypt
- Canberra, Australia
- Cologne, Germany
- Copenhagen, Denmark
- Delhi, India
- Doha, Qatar
- Dublin, Ireland
- Hanoi, Vietnam
- Havana, Cuba
- Helsinki, Finland
- Île-de-France, France
- Islamabad, Pakistan
- Jakarta, Indonesia
- Johannesburg, South Africa
- Kyiv, Ukraine
- Lima, Peru
- London, England, United Kingdom
- Manila, Philippines
- Minsk, Belarus
- Mexico City, Mexico
- Moscow, Russia
- New York City, United States
- Ottawa, Canada
- Phnom Penh, Cambodia
- Riga, Latvia
- Rio de Janeiro, Brazil
- San José, Costa Rica
- Santiago, Chile
- Seoul, South Korea
- Tallinn, Estonia
- Tehran, Iran
- Tel Aviv, Israel
- Tirana, Albania
- Tokyo, Japan
- Ulaanbaatar, Mongolia
- Vientiane, Laos
- Washington, D.C., United States
- Wellington, New Zealand

=== Foreign embassies and consulates ===
In 2019, China had the largest diplomatic network in the world. China hosts a large diplomatic community in its capital city of Beijing; as of 2020, the Chinese capital hosts 173 embassies, one consulate and three representatives, excluding the trade offices of Hong Kong and Macau.

- Afghanistan
- Albania
- Algeria
- Angola
- Antigua and Barbuda
- Argentina
- Armenia
- Australia
- Austria
- Azerbaijan
- Bahamas
- Bahrain
- Bangladesh
- Barbados
- Belarus
- Belgium
- Benin
- Bolivia
- Bosnia and Herzegovina
- Botswana
- Brazil
- Brunei
- Bulgaria
- Burkina Faso
- Burundi
- Cambodia
- Cameroon
- Canada
- Cape Verde
- Central African Republic
- Chad
- Chile
- Colombia
- Comoros
- Republic of the Congo
- Democratic Republic of the Congo
- Costa Rica
- Croatia
- Cuba
- Cyprus
- Czech Republic
- Denmark
- Djibouti
- Dominica
- Dominican Republic
- East Timor
- Ecuador
- Egypt
- El Salvador
- Equatorial Guinea
- Eritrea
- Estonia
- Ethiopia
- Fiji
- Finland
- France
- Gabon
- Gambia
- Georgia
- Germany
- Ghana
- Greece
- Grenada
- Guinea
- Guinea-Bissau
- Guyana
- Honduras
- Hungary
- Iceland
- India
- Indonesia
- Iran
- Iraq
- Ireland
- Israel
- Italy
- Ivory Coast
- Jamaica
- Japan
- Jordan
- Kazakhstan
- Kenya
- Kuwait
- Kyrgyzstan
- Laos
- Latvia
- Lebanon
- Lesotho
- Liberia
- Libya
- Lithuania
- Luxembourg
- Madagascar
- Malawi
- Malaysia
- Maldives
- Mali
- Malta
- Mauritania
- Mauritius
- Mexico
- Micronesia
- Moldova
- Mongolia
- Monaco (consulate)
- Montenegro
- Morocco
- Mozambique
- Myanmar
- Namibia
- Nepal
- Netherlands
- New Zealand
- Nicaragua
- Niger
- Nigeria
- North Korea
- North Macedonia
- Norway
- Oman
- Pakistan
- Palestine
- Panama
- Papua New Guinea
- Peru
- Philippines
- Poland
- Portugal
- Qatar
- Romania
- Russia
- Rwanda
- Samoa
- São Tomé and Príncipe
- Saudi Arabia
- Senegal
- Serbia
- Seychelles
- Sierra Leone
- Singapore
- Slovakia
- Slovenia
- Solomon Islands
- Somalia
- South Africa
- South Korea
- South Sudan
- Spain
- Sri Lanka
- Sudan
- Suriname
- Sweden
- Switzerland
- Syria
- Tajikistan
- Tanzania
- Thailand
- Togo
- Tonga
- Trinidad and Tobago
- Tunisia
- Turkey
- Turkmenistan
- Uganda
- Ukraine
- United Arab Emirates
- United Kingdom
- United States
- Uruguay
- Uzbekistan
- Vanuatu
- Venezuela
- Vietnam
- Yemen
- Zambia
- Zimbabwe

=== Representative offices and delegations ===
- Haiti (Representative Office)
- Faroe Islands (Representative Office)
- European Union (Delegation of the European Union to China)

== See also ==
- Beijing city fortifications
- Historical capitals of China
- List of hospitals in Beijing
- List of diplomatic missions in China
- Politics of Beijing
- First‑tier city

== Notes ==
Preceded by Lin'an (Song dynasty)	Capital of China (as Dadu of Yuan); 1264–1368	Succeeded by Nanjing (Ming dynasty)
Preceded by Nanjing (Ming dynasty)	Capital of China; 1420–1928	Succeeded by Nanjing (ROC)
Preceded by Nanjing (ROC); Guangzhou (ROC, until October 1)	Capital of the People's Republic of China; 1949–present	Succeeded by present capital
