= Gaomidian Subdistrict =

Gaomidian Subdistrict 高米店街道
- Subdistrict
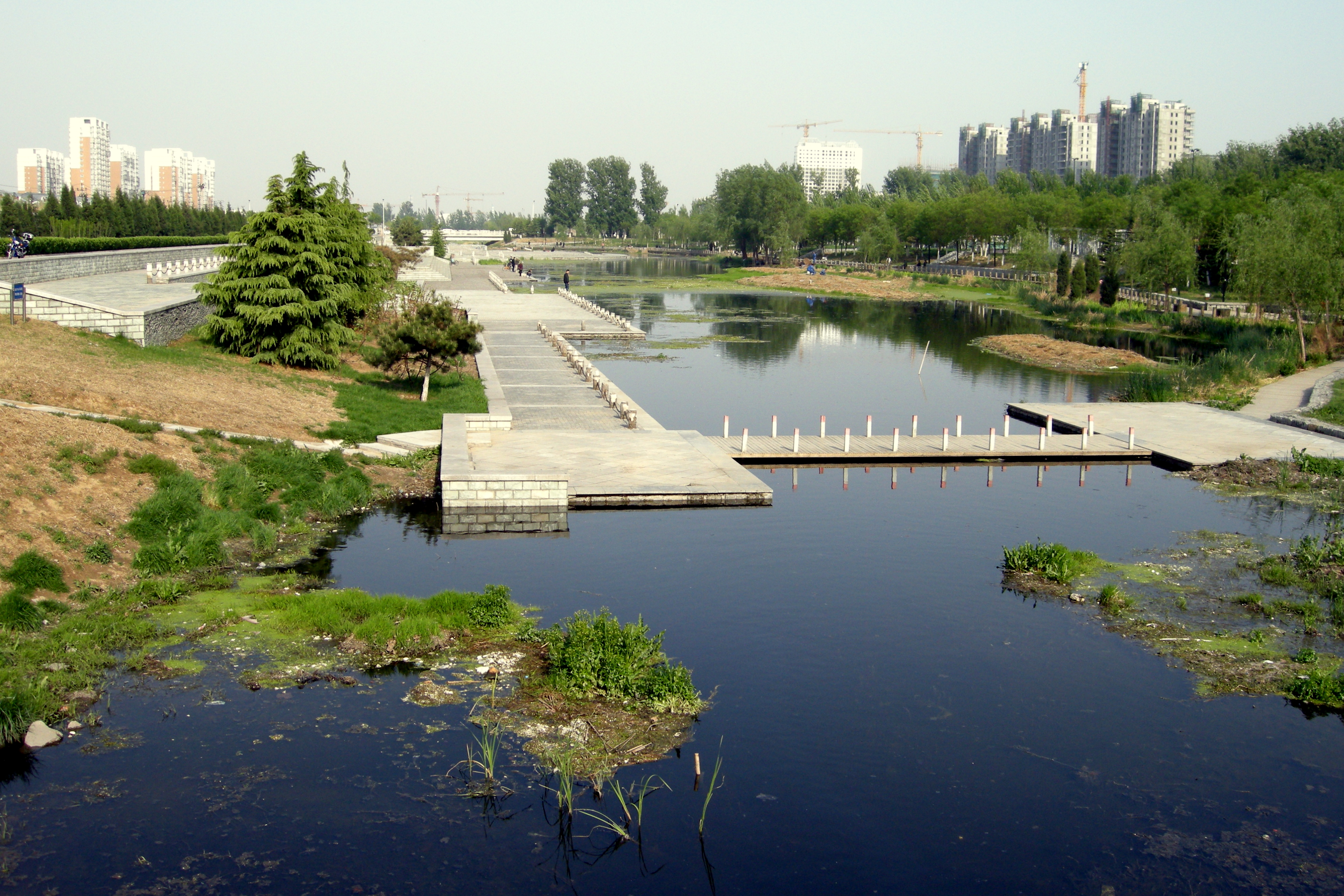
- Binhe Park within the subdistrict, 2012

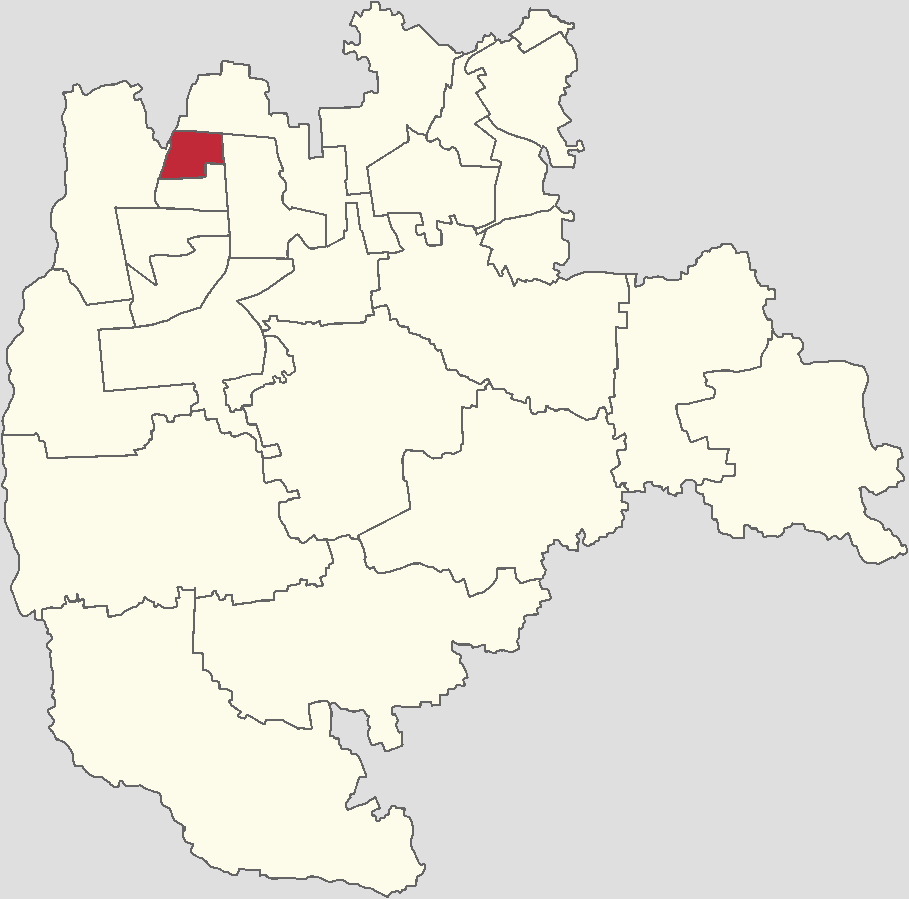
- Location in Daxing District

- Location within Beijing Location within China
- Coordinates: 39°45′51″N 116°18′38″E
- Country: China
- Municipality: Beijing
- District: Daxing
- Village-level Divisions: 19 communities

Area
  - Total: 5.59 km^{2} (2.16 sq mi)
- Elevation: 45 m (148 ft)

Population (2020)
  - Total: 99,959
  - Density: 17,900/km^{2} (46,300/sq mi)
- Time zone: UTC+8 (China Standard)
- Postal code: 102612
- Area code: 010

Gaomidian Subdistrict (Chinese: 高米店街道; pinyin: Gāomǐdiàn Jiēdào) is a subdistrict situated on the northern side of Daxing District, Beijing, China. It borders Xihongmen Town to its north, Guanyinsi Subdistrict to its east, Qingyuan Subdistrict to its south, as well as Huangcun Town and Huaxiang Subdistrict to its west. It was home to 99,959 people as of 2020.

The subdistrict was created from the northern section of Qingyuan Subdistrict in 2014.

== Administrative divisions ==
At the end of 2021, Gaomidian Subdistrict was composed of the following 19 communities:

Administrative division code	Subdivision names	Name transliteration
110115011001	康盛园	Kangshengyuan
110115011002	康和园	Kangheyuan
110115011003	康隆园	Kanglongyuan
110115011004	兴涛	Xingtao
110115011005	兴盛园	Xingshengyuan
110115011006	香海园	Xianghaiyuan
110115011007	香留园	Xiangliuyuan
110115011008	金惠园二区	Jinhuiyuan Erqu
110115011009	金惠园三区	Jinhuiyuan Sanqu
110115011010	郁花园	Yuhuayuan
110115011011	郁花园二里	Yuhuayuan Erli
110115011012	茉莉	Moli
110115011013	绿地	Lüdi
110115011014	香旺园	Xiangwangyuan
110115011015	康邑园	Kangyiyuan
110115011016	康泰园	Kangtaiyuan
110115011017	双高花园	Shuanggao Huayuan
110115011018	郁花园三里	Yuhuayuan Sanli
110115011019	香乐园	Xiangleyuan

== See also ==
- List of township-level divisions of Beijing
