= Linxiaolu Subdistrict =

Linxiaolu Subdistrict 林校路街道
- Subdistrict
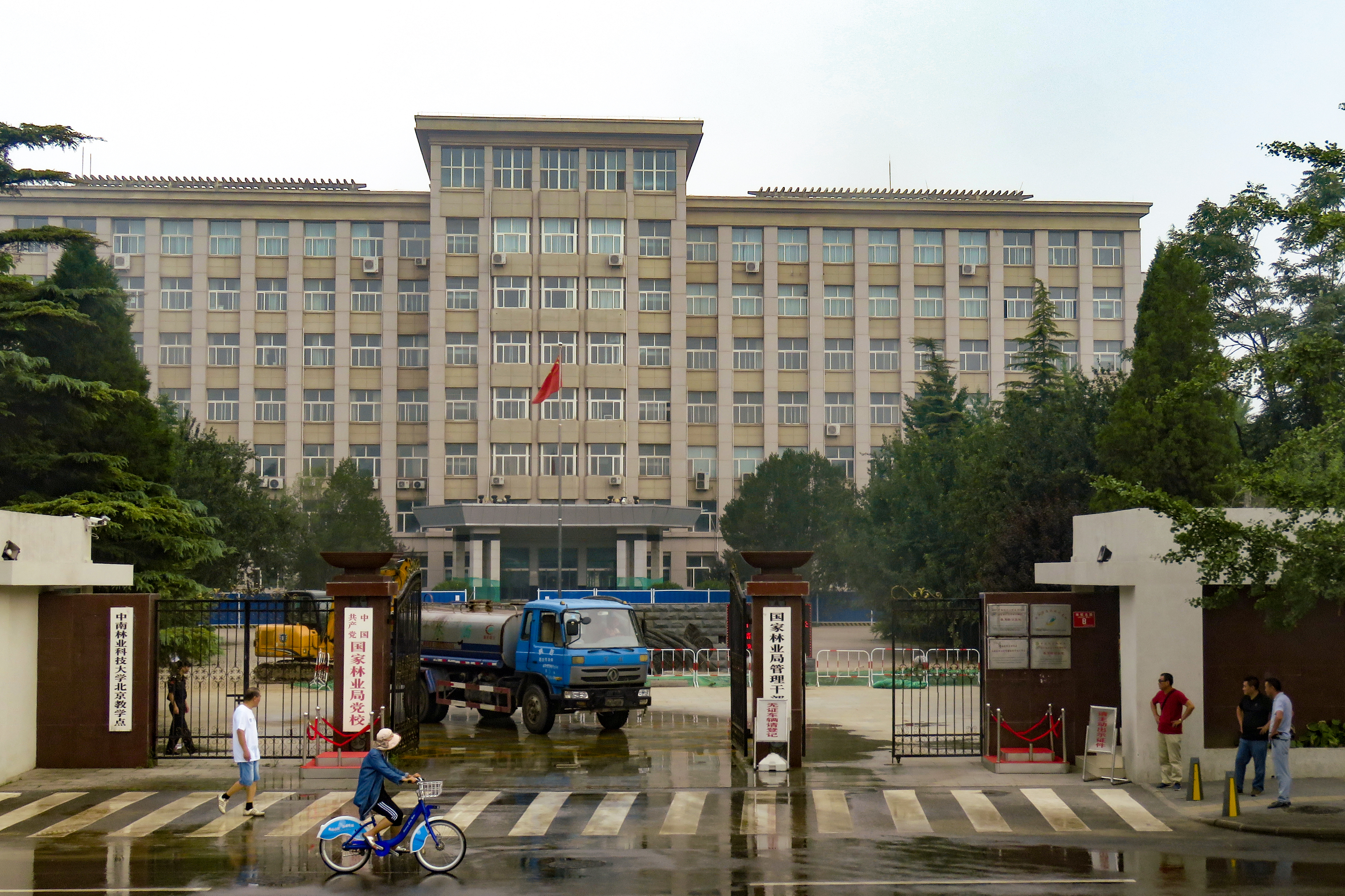
- State Academy of Forestry Administration within the subdistrict, 2018

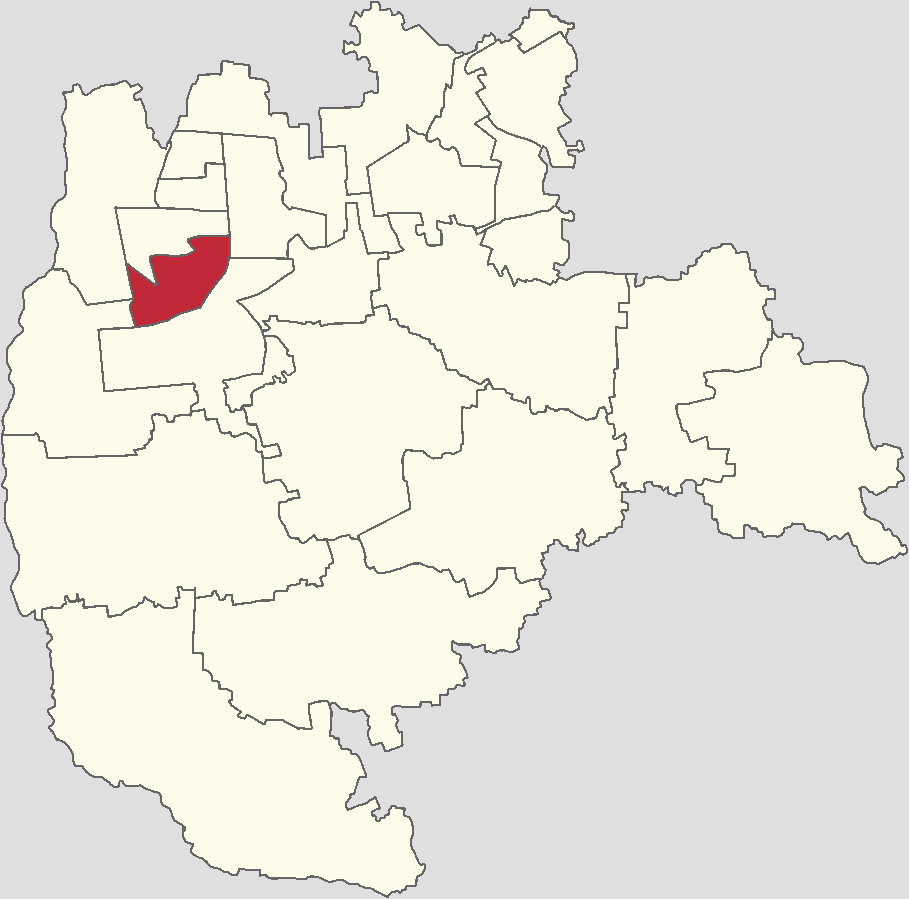
- Location of Linxiaolu Subdistrict in Daxing District

- Location within Beijing Location within China
- Coordinates: 39°43′16″N 116°19′42″E
- Country: China
- Municipality: Beijing
- District: Daxing
- Village-level Divisions: 23 communities

Area
  - Total: 13.02 km^{2} (5.03 sq mi)
- Elevation: 42 m (138 ft)

Population (2020)
  - Total: 81,389
  - Density: 6,251/km^{2} (16,190/sq mi)
- Time zone: UTC+8 (China Standard)
- Postal code: 102600
- Area code: 010

Linxiaolu Subdistrict (Chinese: 林校路街道; pinyin: Línxiàolù Jiēdào) is a subdistrict in northwestern Daxing District, Beijing, China. It borders Xingfeng Subdistrict to its north, Guanyinsi Subdistrict to its east, Tiangongyuan Subdistrict to its south, as well as Beizangcun and Huangcun Towns to its west. In 2020, it was home to 81,389 residents.

The subdistrict was named after Linxiao Road (Chinese: 林校路; lit. 'Forest School Road'), which in turn gets into name from the State Academy of Forest Administration.

== History ==
History of Linxiaolu Subdistrict
Year	Status	Under
1912 - 1928		Daxing County, Capital Area
1928 - 1937		3rd Prefecture, Hebei
1937 - 1949		5th Prefecture, Hebei
1949 - 1958		Tong County, Hebei
1958 - 1981		Daxing County, Beijing
1981 - 2001	Part of Huangcun Town	Daxing County, Beijing
2001–present	Linxiaolu Subdistrict	Daxing District

== Administrative divisions ==
In the year 2021, Linxiaolu Subdistrict was formed by the following 23 communities:

Administrative division code	Subdivision names	Name transliteration
110115002001	车站南里	Chezhan Nanli
110115002002	车站中里	Chezhan Zhongli
110115002004	义和庄东里	Yihezhuang Dongli
110115002009	义和庄南里	Yihezhuang Nanli
110115002010	饮马井	Yinmajing
110115002011	铁路	Tielu
110115002013	兴水	Xingshui
110115002015	永华南里	Yonghua Nanli
110115002016	兴政西里	Xingzheng Xili
110115002017	兴政东里	Xingzheng Dongli
110115002018	林校北里	Linxiao Beili
110115002019	车站北里	Chezhan Beili
110115002020	建兴	Jianxing
110115002021	永华北里	Yonghua Beili
110115002022	兴华南里	Xinghua Nanli
110115002023	火神庙	Huoshenmiao
110115002024	兴政中里	Xingzheng Zhongli
110115002025	罗奇营一区	Luoqiying Yiqu
110115002026	罗奇营二区	Luoqiying Erqu
110115002027	义和庄北里	Yihezhuang Beili
110115002028	新源西里	Xinyuan Xili
110115002400	新源大街26号院	Xinyuan Dajie 26 Haoyuan
110115002401	新源大街27号院	Xinyuan Dajie 27 Haoyuan

== Gallery ==
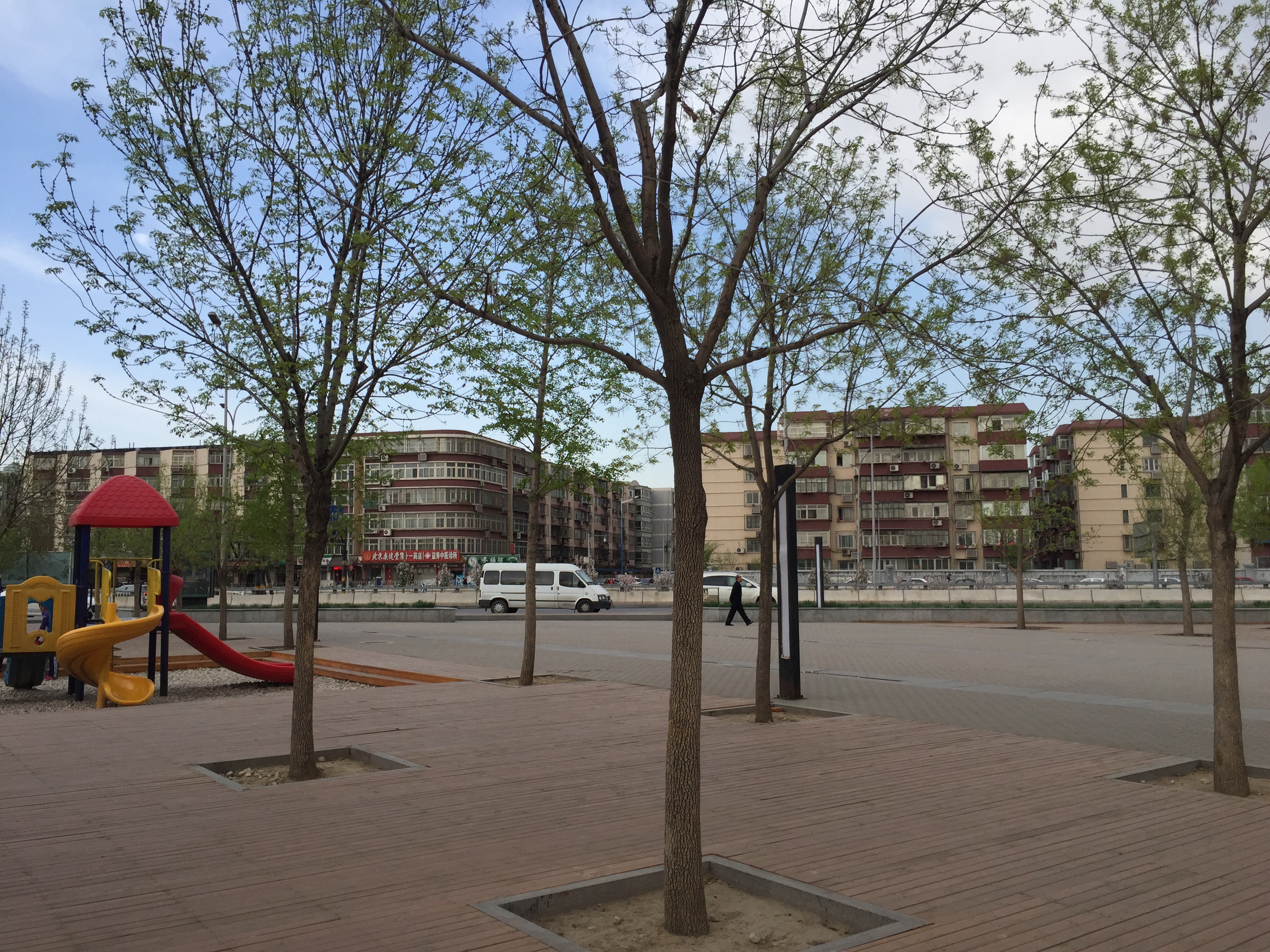
Front square of Huangcun Railway Station, 2016

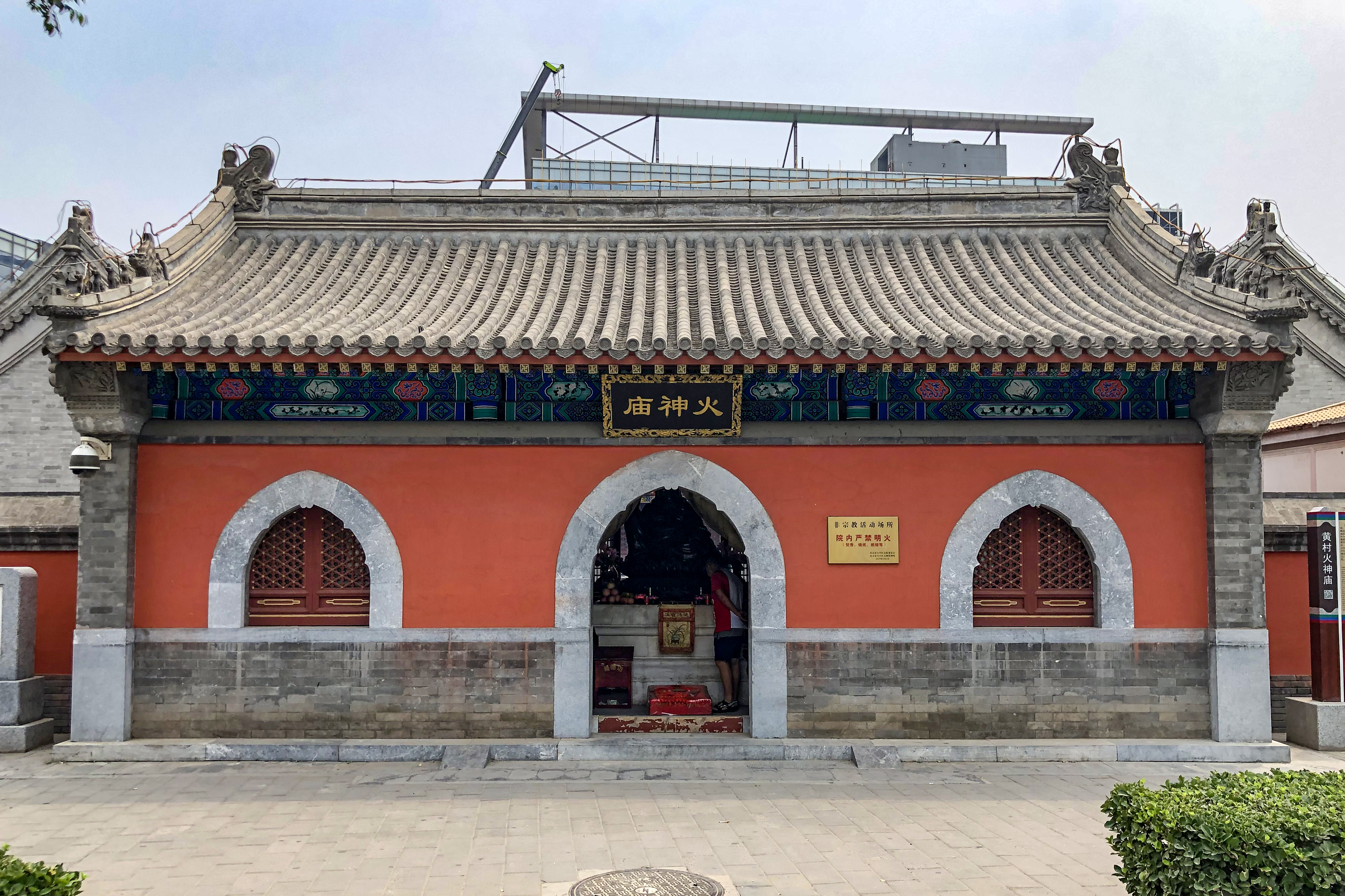
Huangcun Fire God Temple, 2018

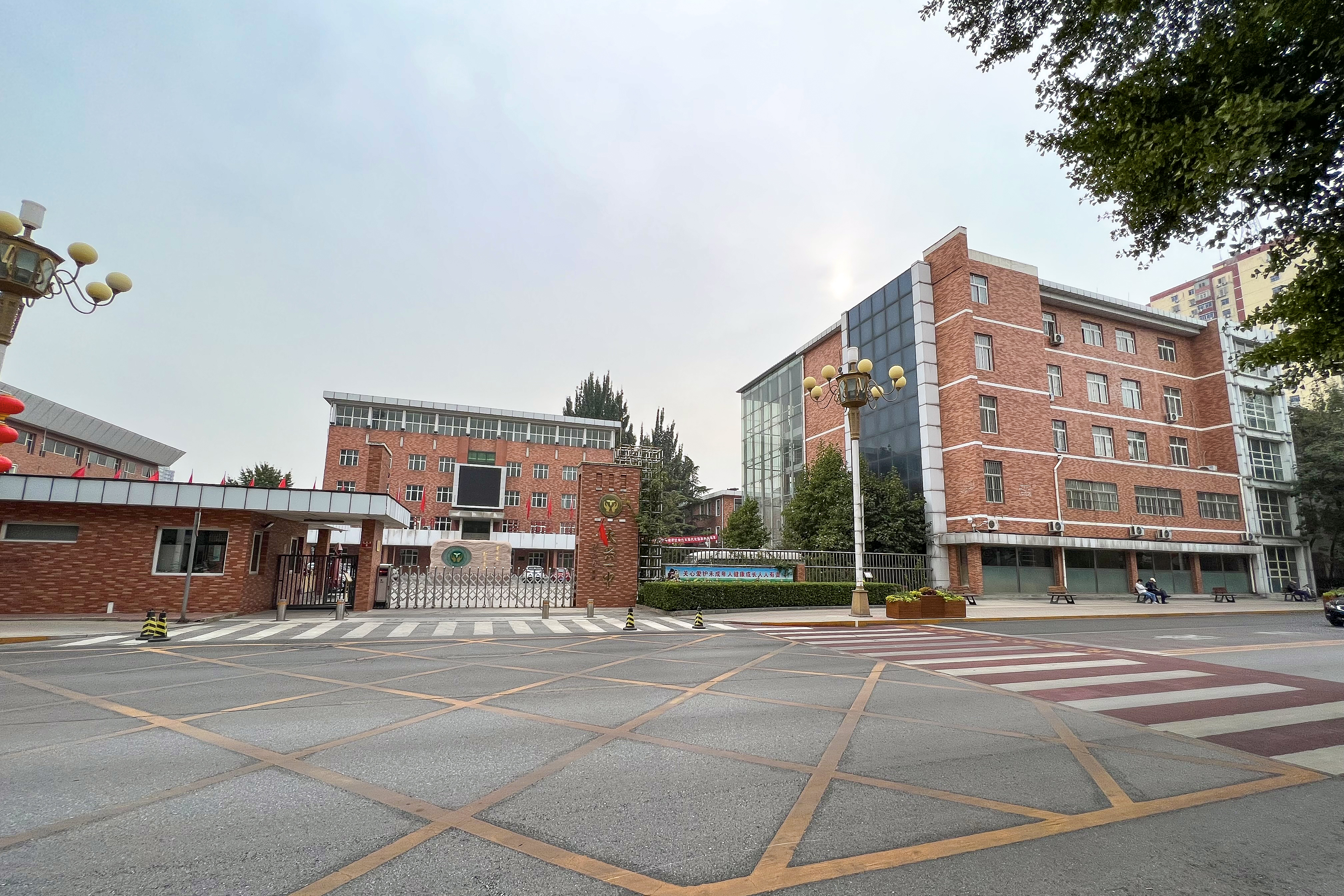
Daxing No.1 Middle School

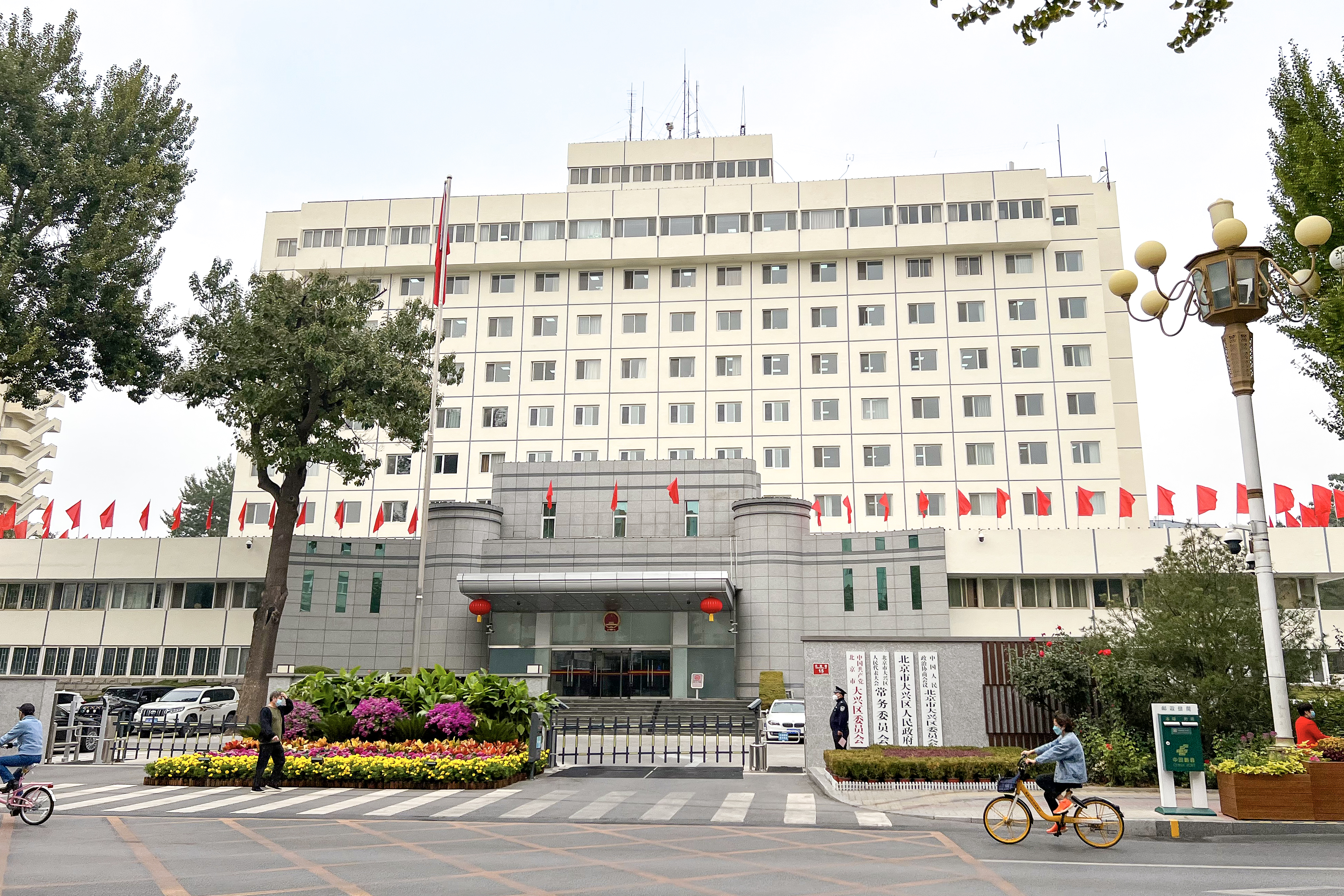
Building of Daxing District People's Government, 2022

== See also ==
- List of township-level divisions of Beijing
