= Lixian, Beijing =

Town located in Beijing, China

Lixian Town 礼贤镇
- Town
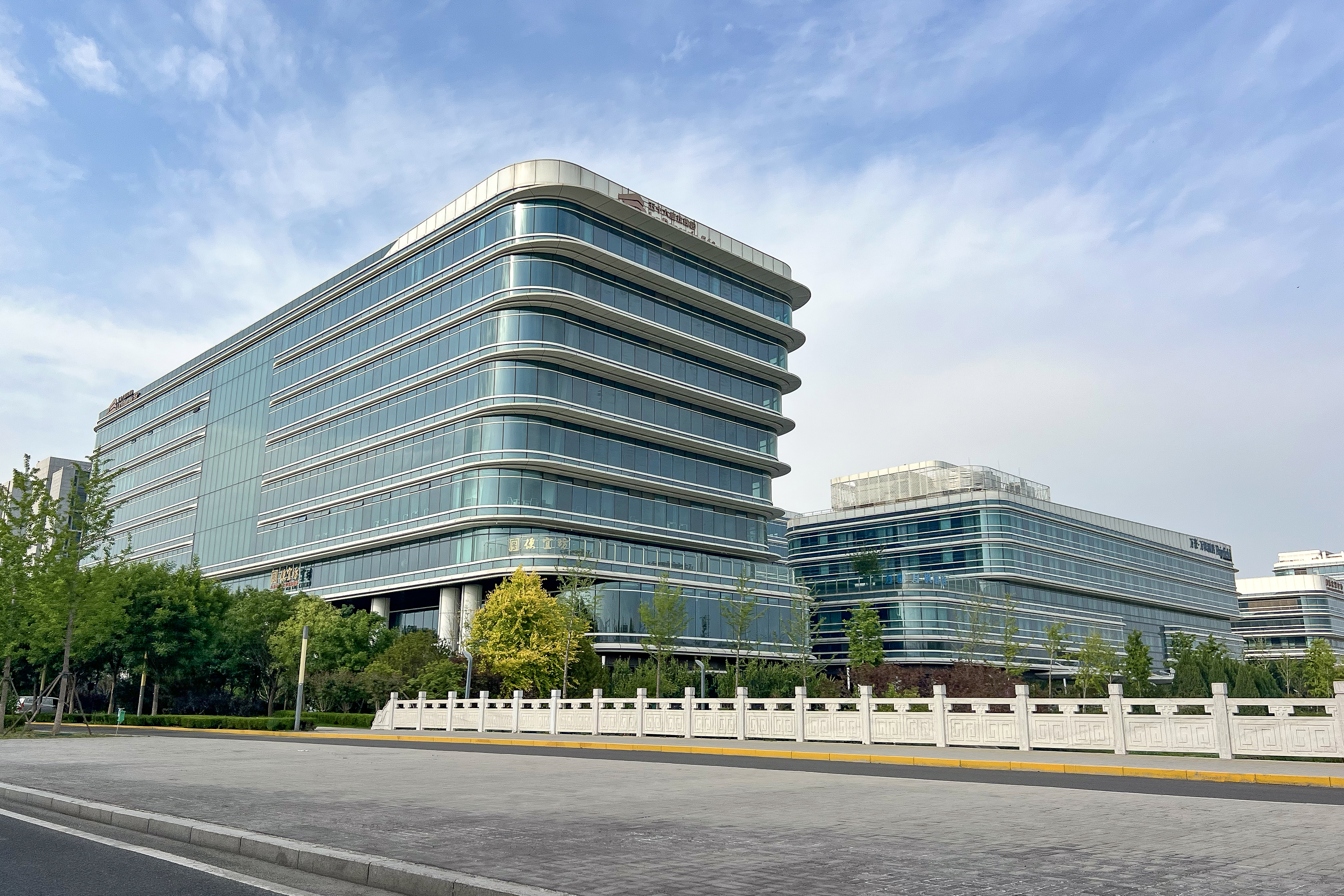
- La Roseraie 56° within the town, 2025

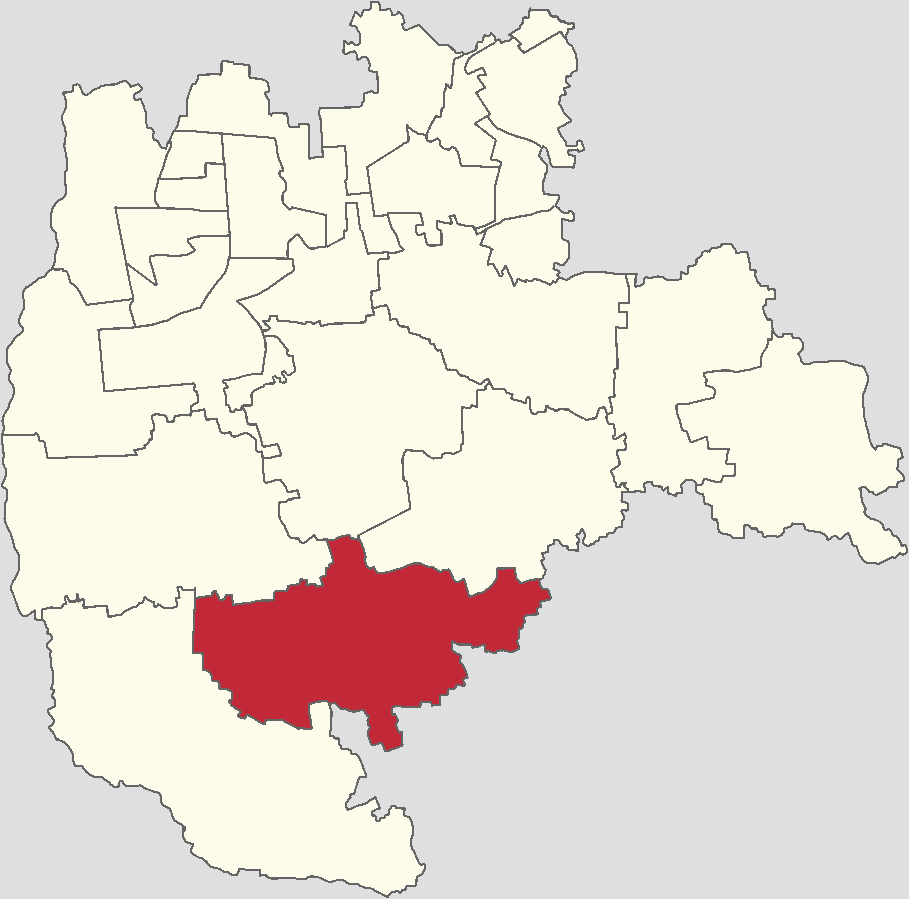
- Location of Lixian Town in Daxing District

- Location within Beijing Location within China
- Coordinates: 39°33′20″N 116°25′45″E
- Country: China
- Municipality: Beijing
- District: Daxing
- Village-level Divisions: 2 communities 42 villages

Area
  - Total: 93.47 km^{2} (36.09 sq mi)
- Elevation: 29 m (95 ft)

Population (2020)
  - Total: 40,930
  - Density: 437.9/km^{2} (1,134/sq mi)
- Time zone: UTC+8 (China Standard)
- Postal code: 102604
- Area code: 010

Lixian Town (simplified Chinese: 礼贤镇; traditional Chinese: 禮賢鎮; pinyin: Lǐxián Zhèn) is a town in the southeastern side of Daxing District, Beijing, China. It shares border with Weishanzhuang and Anding Towns in the north, Wanzhuang and Jiuzhou Towns in the east, Yufa Town in the southwest, and Panggezhuang Town in the northwest. In 2020, it had a total population of 40,930.

The name of this town corresponds to Lixianguan (Chinese: 礼贤馆; lit. 'Rites and Talents Accommodation'), which was built in the area by King Zhao of Yan during Spring and Autumn period.

== History ==
Timeline of Lixian's History
Year	Status	Under
1949 - 1953	1st District	Daxing County
1953 - 1958	Lixian Township Daxinzhuang Township	Daxing County
1958 - 1961	(Lixian) Administered by Anding People's Commune (Daxinzhuang) Administered by Yubao People's Commune	Daxing County
1961 - 1983	Lixian People's Commune Daxinzhuang People's Commune	Daxing County
1983 - 1990	Lixian Township Daxinzhuang Township	Daxing County
1990 - 2000	Lixian Town Daxinzhuang Township	Daxing County
2000 - 2001	Lixian Town	Daxing County
2001–present	Lixian Town	Daxing District

== Administrative divisions ==
In the year 2021, Lixian Town administered 44 subdivisions within its borders, with 2 communities, and 42 villages:

Administrative division code	Subdivision names	Name transliterations	Type
110115106001	庆贤南里	Qinghe Nanli	Community
110115106002	庆贤北里	Qinghe Beili	Community
110115106200	龙头村	Longtou Cun	Village
110115106201	王庄村	Wangzhuang Cun	Village
110115106202	西段家务村	Xi Duanjiawu Cun	Village
110115106203	东段家务村	Dong Duanjiawu Cun	Village
110115106204	平地村	Pingdi Cun	Village
110115106205	河北头村	Hebeitou Cun	Village
110115106206	小刘各庄村	Xiao Liugezhuang Cun	Village
110115106207	伍各庄村	Wugezhuang Cun	Village
110115106208	内官庄村	Neiguanzhuang Cun	Village
110115106209	佃子村	Dianzi Cun	Village
110115106210	孙家营村	Sunjiaying Cun	Village
110115106211	赵家园村	Zhaojiayuan Cun	Village
110115106212	紫各庄村	Zigezhuang Cun	Village
110115106213	小马坊村	Xiaomafang Cun	Village
110115106214	礼贤一村	Lixian Yicun	Village
110115106215	礼贤二村	Lixian Ercun	Village
110115106216	礼贤三村	Lixian Sancun	Village
110115106217	田家营村	Tianjiaying Cun	Village
110115106218	西里河村	Xilihe Cun	Village
110115106219	祁各庄村	Qigezhuang Cun	Village
110115106220	李各庄村	Ligezhuang Cun	Village
110115106221	荆家务村	Jingjiawu Cun	Village
110115106222	柏树庄村	Boshuzhuang Cun	Village
110115106223	王化庄村	Wanghuazhuang Cun	Village
110115106226	东黄垡村	Donghuangfa Cun	Village
110115106227	贺北村	Hebei Cun	Village
110115106228	西白疃村	Xi Baituan Cun	Village
110115106229	东白疃村	Dong Baituan Cun	Village
110115106230	苑南村	Yuannan Cun	Village
110115106231	后杨各庄村	Hou Yanggezhuang Cun	Village
110115106232	前杨各庄村	Qian Yanggezhuang Cun	Village
110115106233	黎明村	Liming Cun	Village
110115106234	宏升村	Hongsheng Cun	Village
110115106235	中心村	Zhongxin Cun	Village
110115106236	昕升村	Xinsheng Cun	Village
110115106237	东安村	Dong'an Cun	Village
110115106238	西郏河村	Xi Jiahe Cun	Village
110115106239	东郏河村	Dong Jiahe Cun	Village
110115106240	石柱子村	Shizhuzi Cun	Village
110115106241	董各庄村	Donggezhuang Cun	Village
110115106242	西梁各庄村	Xi Lianggezhuang Cun	Village
110115106243	东梁各庄村	Dong Lianggezhuang Cun	Village

== See also ==
- List of township-level divisions of Beijing
