= YGQ =

YGQ may refer to:

- Geraldton (Greenstone Regional) Airport, Ontario, Canada, IATA airport code YGQ
- Yang Guang Qing School of Beijing, China
