= Zhangziying =

Zhangziying Town 长子营镇
- Town
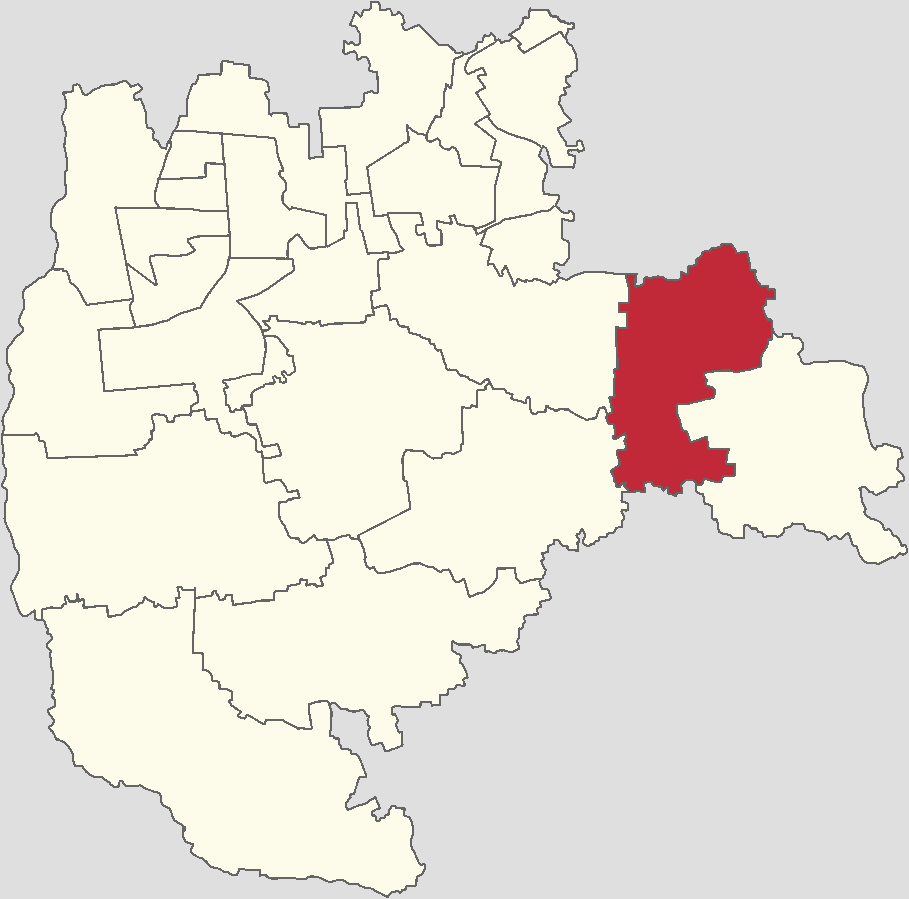
- Location in Daxing District

- Location within Beijing Location within China
- Coordinates: 39°41′03″N 116°35′24″E
- Country: China
- Municipality: Beijing
- District: Daxing
- Village-level Divisions: 42 villages 1 industry park

Area
  - Total: 59.78 km^{2} (23.08 sq mi)
- Elevation: 23 m (75 ft)

Population (2020)
  - Total: 34,588
  - Density: 578.6/km^{2} (1,499/sq mi)
- Time zone: UTC+8 (China Standard)
- Postal code: 102615
- Area code: 010

Zhangziying Town (simplified Chinese: 长子营镇; traditional Chinese: 長子營鎮; pinyin: Zhǎngzǐyíng Zhèn) is a town located on the eastern portion of Daxing District, Beijing, China. It borders Majuqiao Town in its north, Caiyu Town in its east, Wanzhuang Town in its south, as well as Anding and Qingyundian Towns in its west. It had a total population of 34,588 as of 2020.

The name Zhangziying is taken from Zhangzi County on southern Shanxi, where many of the original settlers of Zhangziying were from.

== History ==
Timeline of Zhangziying's History
| Year | Status | Under |
|---|---|---|
| 1949 - 1953 | 5th District | Daxing County, Hebei |
| 1953 - 1958 | Zhangziying Township | Daxing County, Hebei |
| 1958 - 1960 | Administered by Caiyu People's Commune | Daxing District, Beijing |
| 1960 - 1961 | Administered by Caiyu People's Commune | Daxing County, Beijing |
| 1961 - 1983 | Zhangziying People's Commune | Daxing County, Beijing |
| 1983 - 2 Cun | Zhangziying Township | Daxing County, Beijing |
| 2 Cun - 2001 | Zhangziying Town (Merged with Zhuzhuang Township in 2 villages) | Daxing County, Beijing |
| 2001–present | Zhangziying Town (Merged with Zhuzhuang Township in 2 villages) | Daxing District, Beijing |

== Administrative divisions ==
As of 2021, Zhangziying Town wcovereds 43 subdivisions, composed of 42 villages and 1 industry park:

| Administrative division code | Subdivision names | Name transliterations | Type |
|---|---|---|---|
| 110115111200 | 牛坊村 | Niufang Cun | Village |
| 110115111201 | 朱脑村 | Zhunao Cun | Village |
| 110115111202 | 李家务村 | Lijiawu Cun | Village |
| 110115111203 | 北辛庄村 | Beixinzhuang Cun | Village |
| 110115111204 | 留民营村 | Liuminying Cun | Village |
| 110115111205 | 赵县营村 | Zhaoxianying Cun | Village |
| 110115111206 | 窦营村 | Douying Cun | Village |
| 110115111207 | 靳七营村 | Jinqiying Cun | Village |
| 110115111208 | 北泗上村 | Beisishang Cun | Village |
| 110115111209 | 郑二营村 | Zheng'erying Cun | Village |
| 110115111210 | 沁水营村 | Qinshuiying Cun | Village |
| 110115111211 | 上长子营村 | Shang Zhangziying Cun | Village |
| 110115111212 | 下长子营村 | Xia Zhangziying Cun | Village |
| 110115111213 | 河津营村 | Hejinying Cun | Village |
| 110115111214 | 安场村 | Anchang Cun | Village |
| 110115111215 | 小黑垡村 | Xiaoheifa Cun | Village |
| 110115111216 | 白庙村 | Baimiao Cun | Village |
| 110115111217 | 上黎城村 | Shanglicheng Cun | Village |
| 110115111218 | 孙庄村 | Sunzhuang Cun | Village |
| 110115111219 | 北蒲洲营村 | Bei Puzhouying Cun | Village |
| 110115111220 | 潞城营一村 | Luchengying Yicun | Village |
| 110115111221 | 潞城营二村 | Luchengying Ercun | Village |
| 110115111222 | 潞城营三村 | Luchengying Sancun | Village |
| 110115111223 | 潞城营四村 | Luchengying Sicun | Village |
| 110115111224 | 佟庄村 | Tongzhuang Cun | Village |
| 110115111225 | 永和庄村 | Yonghezhuang Cun | Village |
| 110115111226 | 南蒲洲营村 | Nan Puzhouying Cun | Village |
| 110115111227 | 车固营一村 | Cheguying Yicun | Village |
| 110115111228 | 车固营二村 | Cheguying Ercun | Village |
| 110115111229 | 周营村 | Zhouying Cun | Village |
| 110115111230 | 公和庄村 | Gonghezhuang Cun | Village |
| 110115111231 | 罗庄一村 | Luozhuang Yicun | Village |
| 110115111232 | 罗庄二村 | Luozhuang Ercun | Village |
| 110115111233 | 罗庄三村 | Luozhuang Sancun | Village |
| 110115111234 | 朱庄村 | Zhuzhuang Cun | Village |
| 110115111235 | 和顺场村 | Heshunchang Cun | Village |
| 110115111236 | 西北台村 | Xi Beitai Cun | Village |
| 110115111237 | 东北台村 | Dong Beitai Cun | Village |
| 110115111238 | 再城营一村 | Zaichengying Yicun | Village |
| 110115111239 | 再城营二村 | Zaichengying Ercun | Village |
| 110115111240 | 赤鲁村 | Chilu Cun | Village |
| 110115111241 | 李堡村 | Libao Cun | Village |
| 110115111401 | 军民结合 | Junmin Jiehe | Industry Park |

== See also ==
- List of township-level divisions of Beijing
