= Daxing, Beijing =

Daxing 大兴区
- District
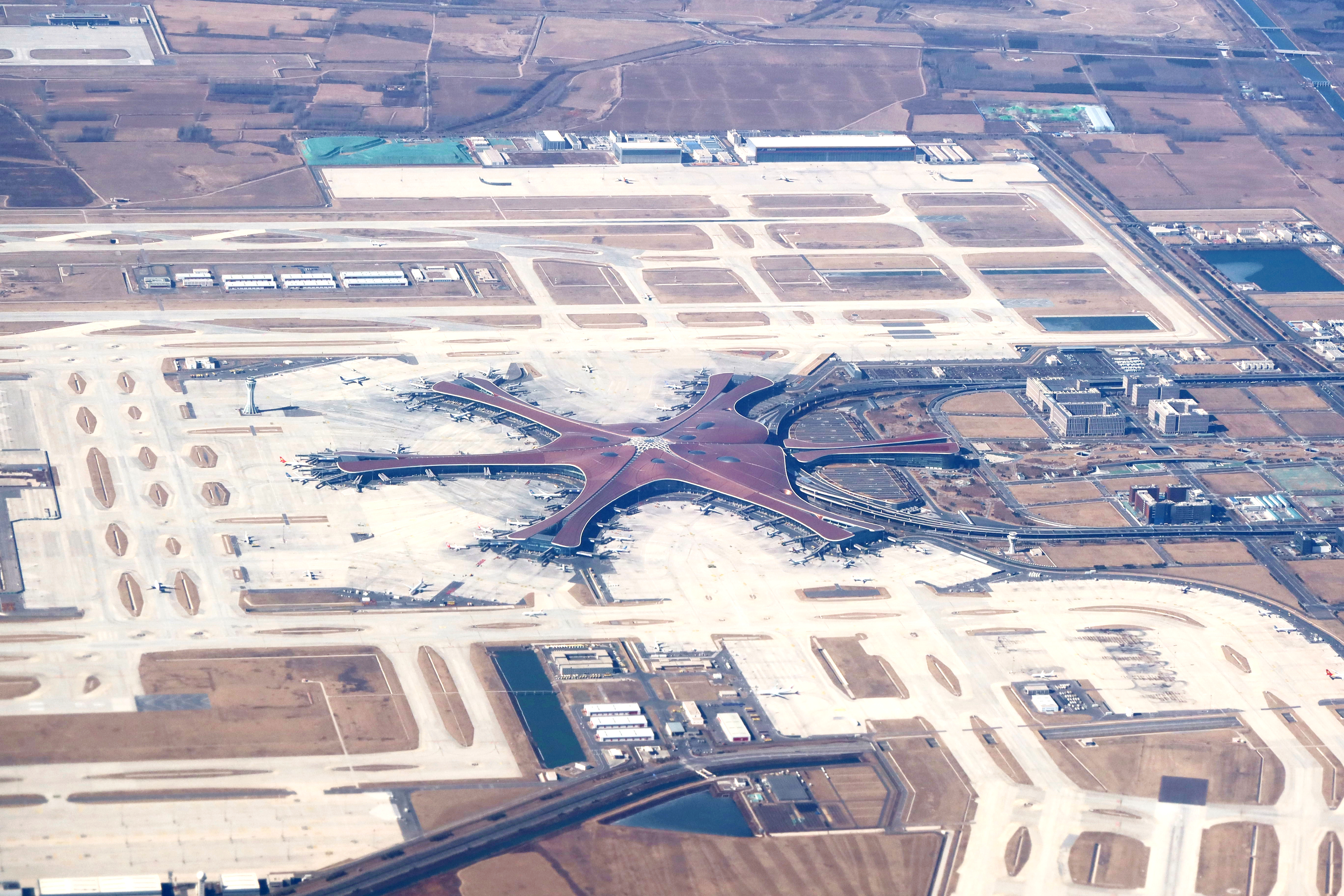
- Beijing Daxing International Airport
- Interactive map of Daxing
- Coordinates: 39°43′37″N 116°20′29″E
- Country: People's Republic of China
- Municipality: Beijing
- Township-level divisions: 10 subdistricts 9 towns
- District seat: Xingfeng Subdistrict (兴丰街道)

Area
  - Total: 1,012 km^{2} (391 sq mi)

Population (2020)
  - Total: 1,993,591
  - Density: 1,970/km^{2} (5,102/sq mi)
- Time zone: UTC+8 (China Standard)
- Area code: 0010

Daxing District (Chinese: 大兴区; pinyin: Dàxīng Qū) is a district of Beijing, covering the southern suburbs of the city. It borders the Beijing districts of Tongzhou to the east/northeast, Fangshan to the west, Fengtai to the northwest, Chaoyang to the northeast, and the Hebei province to the south.

== History ==
The Daxing Massacre of August 27-31, 1966 during the Cultural Revolution resulted in the deaths of at least 325 people, ranging in age from 38 days to 80 years.

Daxing District was upgraded from a county to a district with the approval from the State Council on April 30, 2001. Covering an area of 1,012 square kilometres (391 sq mi) with a population of 671,444, Panggezhuang in Daxing is famous for its watermelons.

== Culture ==
Located in the south of Beijing, the area is not as affluent as those that most visitors to Beijing are familiar with, such as Xidan and Guomao. Much of the industry in Daxing is related to distribution of food and consumer goods to service Beijing. There are many self-built communities casually created by the residents themselves, mostly of whom have moved in from the countryside.

== Government and infrastructure ==
The Beijing Municipal Administration of Prisons operates the following correctional facilities in the district:

- Beijing Municipal Prison
- Beijing Women's Prison

== Economy ==
Additionally Okay Airways, and Xiabu Xiabu have their headquarters in Daxing District.

== Education ==
There are two major universities located in Daxing District, the Beijing Institute of Petrochemical Technology and the Beijing Institute of Graphic Communication. Both of them are headquartered in Qingyuan Subdistrict (清源), and have its branch in Kangzhuang (康庄). Qingyuan and Kangzhuang are planned as a university town in Daxing District. The Yang Guang Qing School of Beijing is also located in the district.

The National Seminary of Catholic Church in China is in Daxing District.

== Transportation ==
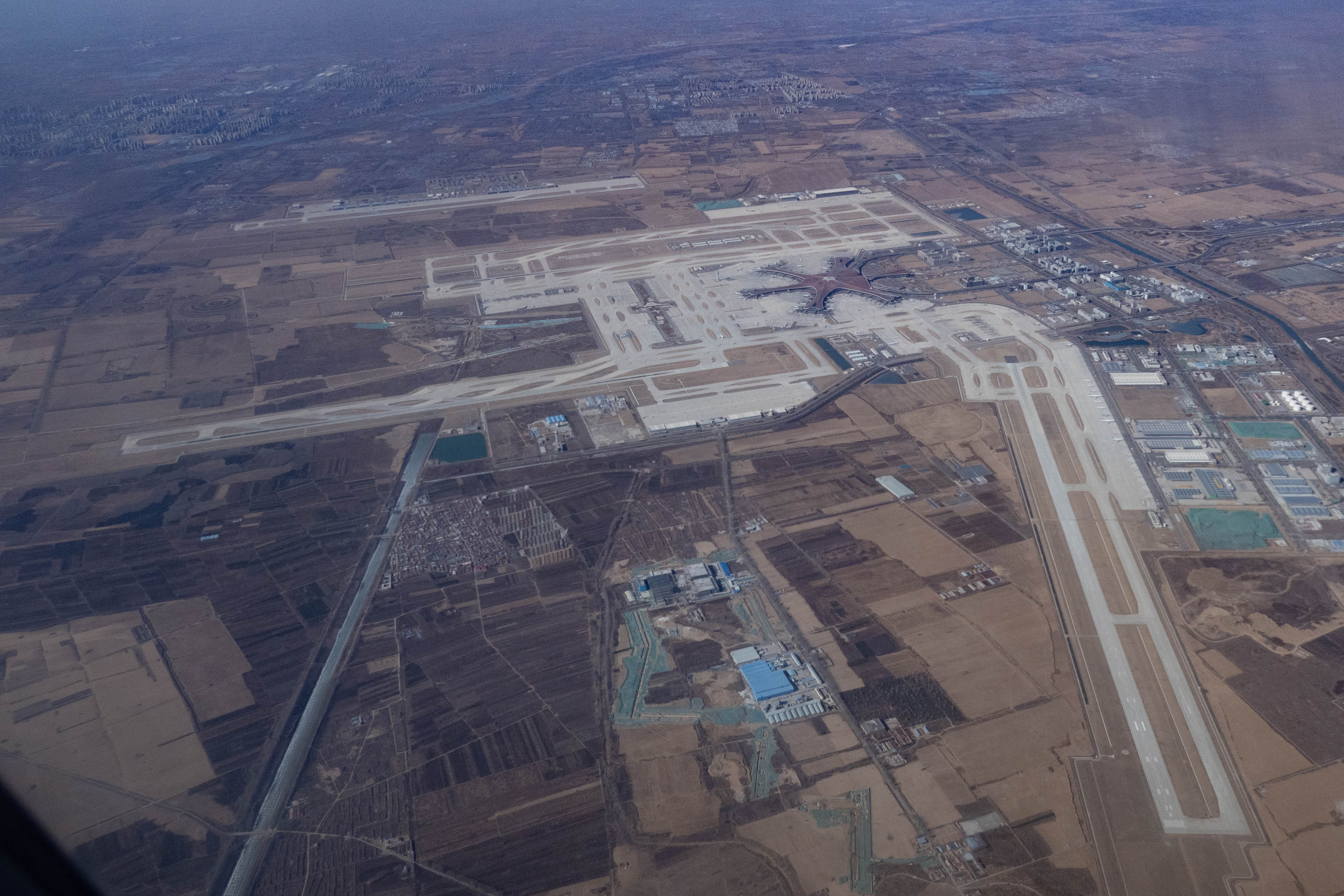
Beijing Daxing International Airport

It was decided in 2009 that Daxing would be the location of the Beijing Daxing International Airport. It was constructed in the southern part of Daxing District of Beijing and along the border of Beijing and Hebei Province. The airport was opened in September 2019.

=== Metro ===
Daxing is currently served by five metro lines of the Beijing Subway:

- Line 8 - Wufutang, Demao, Yinghai
- Daxing line - Xihongmen, Gaomidian North, Gaomidian South, Zaoyuan, Qingyuanlu, Huangcun Xidajie, Huangcun Railway Station, Yihezhuang, Biomedical Base, Tiangongyuan
- Yizhuang line - Jiugong, Yizhuangqiao, Yizhuang Culture Park, Wanyuanjie, Rongjingdongjie, Rongchangdongjie Yizhuang T1
- Daxing Airport Express - Daxing Xincheng
- Yizhuang T1 line - Quzhuang, Rongxing Jie, Ruihezhuang, Taiheqiaobei, Sihaizhuang, Jiuhaocun, Taihe Lu, Lujuandong, Yizhuang Tongren, Rongchang Dongjie Yizhuang , Beijing Etrong Int'l Exhibition & Convention Center

== Administrative divisions ==
As of 2025, there are 8 subdistricts and 14 towns in Daxing.

Name	Chinese (S)	Hanyu Pinyin	Population (2020)	Area (km^{2})
Xingfeng Subdistrict	兴丰街道	Xìngfēng Jiēdào	79,851	9.66
Linxiaolu Subdistrict	林校路街道	Línxiàolù Jiēdào	81.389	12.65
Qingyuan Subdistrict	清源街道	Qīngyuán Jiēdào	147,810	5.58
Guanyinsi Subdistrict	观音寺街道	Guānyīnsì Jiēdào	111,225	16.40
Tiangongyuan Subdistrict	天宫院街道	Tiāngōngyuàn Jiēdào	87,415	33.30
Gaomidian Subdistrict	高米店街道	Gāomǐdiàn Jiēdào	99,959	5.59
Yizhuang town	亦庄镇	Yìzhuāng Zhèn	108,255	39.63
Ronghua Subdistrict	荣华街道	Rónghuá Jiēdào	108,255	39.63
Boxing Subdistrict	博兴街道	Bóxīng Jiēdào	108,255	39.63
Huangcun town	黄村镇	Huángcūn Zhèn	176,890	35.00
Jiugong town	旧宫镇	Jiùgōng Zhèn	189,300	29.73
Xihongmen town	西红门镇	Xīhóngmén Zhèn	179,974	31.20
Yinghai town	瀛海镇	Yínghǎi Zhèn Dìqū	102,463	36.79
Qingyundian town	青云店镇	Qīngyúndiàn Zhèn	69,612	70.00
Caiyu town	采育镇	Cǎiyù Zhèn	54,690	71.6
Anding town	安定镇	Āndìng Zhèn	30,764	78.00
Lixian town	礼贤镇	Lǐxián Zhèn	40,930	92.06
Yufa town	榆垡镇	Yúfá Zhèn	71,812	136.00
Panggezhuang town	庞各庄镇	Pánggèzhuāng Zhèn	74,912	109.30
Beizangcun town	北臧村镇	Běizāngcūn Zhèn	35,391	60.00
Weishanzhuang town	魏善庄镇	Wèishànzhuāng Zhèn	46,661	81.5
Zhangziying town	长子营镇	Zhǎngzǐyíng Zhèn	34,588	63.00
Xihongmen town	西红门镇	Xīhóngmén Zhèn	179,974	29.37

== Climate ==
Daxing has a humid continental climate (Köppen climate classification Dwa). The average annual temperature in Daxing is 12.9 °C (55.2 °F). The average annual rainfall is 533.5 mm (21.00 in) with July as the wettest month. The temperatures are highest on average in July, at around 26.8 °C (80.2 °F), and lowest in January, at around −3.2 °C (26.2 °F).

Climate data for Daxing District, elevation 38 m (125 ft), (1991–2020 normals, extremes 1981–present)
Month	Jan	Feb	Mar	Apr	May	Jun	Jul	Aug	Sep	Oct	Nov	Dec	Year
Record high °C (°F)	14.6 (58.3)	19.8 (67.6)	29.8 (85.6)	33.5 (92.3)	38.7 (101.7)	40.2 (104.4)	41.4 (106.5)	38.1 (100.6)	35.3 (95.5)	30.5 (86.9)	21.8 (71.2)	16.4 (61.5)	41.4 (106.5)
Mean daily maximum °C (°F)	2.3 (36.1)	6.2 (43.2)	13.3 (55.9)	21.2 (70.2)	27.2 (81.0)	30.8 (87.4)	31.7 (89.1)	30.6 (87.1)	26.5 (79.7)	19.4 (66.9)	10.3 (50.5)	3.7 (38.7)	18.6 (65.5)
Daily mean °C (°F)	−3.2 (26.2)	0.3 (32.5)	7.3 (45.1)	15.0 (59.0)	21.1 (70.0)	25.0 (77.0)	26.8 (80.2)	25.7 (78.3)	20.7 (69.3)	13.2 (55.8)	4.7 (40.5)	−1.5 (29.3)	12.9 (55.3)
Mean daily minimum °C (°F)	−7.8 (18.0)	−4.7 (23.5)	1.5 (34.7)	8.6 (47.5)	14.5 (58.1)	19.4 (66.9)	22.5 (72.5)	21.4 (70.5)	15.5 (59.9)	7.9 (46.2)	0.0 (32.0)	−5.7 (21.7)	7.8 (46.0)
Record low °C (°F)	−19.6 (−3.3)	−17.8 (0.0)	−11.3 (11.7)	−2.2 (28.0)	1.8 (35.2)	8.3 (46.9)	14.8 (58.6)	13.4 (56.1)	4.0 (39.2)	−4.2 (24.4)	−11.4 (11.5)	−18.8 (−1.8)	−19.6 (−3.3)
Average precipitation mm (inches)	2.1 (0.08)	5.8 (0.23)	8.3 (0.33)	22.3 (0.88)	36.3 (1.43)	71.0 (2.80)	171.5 (6.75)	109.3 (4.30)	62.2 (2.45)	29.3 (1.15)	13.4 (0.53)	2.0 (0.08)	533.5 (21.01)
Average precipitation days (≥ 0.1 mm)	1.4	2.0	3.0	4.5	6.4	10.2	12.0	10.1	7.1	4.8	3.0	1.4	65.9
Average snowy days	2.6	2.3	1.0	0.1	0	0	0	0	0	0	1.6	2.4	10
Average relative humidity (%)	48	45	42	45	50	61	73	75	69	63	58	50	57
Mean monthly sunshine hours	179.3	181.7	224.2	236.5	263.0	219.1	186.9	199.5	201.6	190.6	161.3	166.4	2,410.1
Percentage possible sunshine	59	60	60	59	59	49	41	48	55	56	54	57	55
Source: China Meteorological AdministrationAll-time June low

New record: On May 1, 2021, the meteorological station of Daxing District observed the lowest temperature of 1.8°C.
