= Qingyuan Subdistrict, Beijing =

Subdistrict located in Beijing, China

Qingyuan Subdistrict 清源街道
- Subdistrict
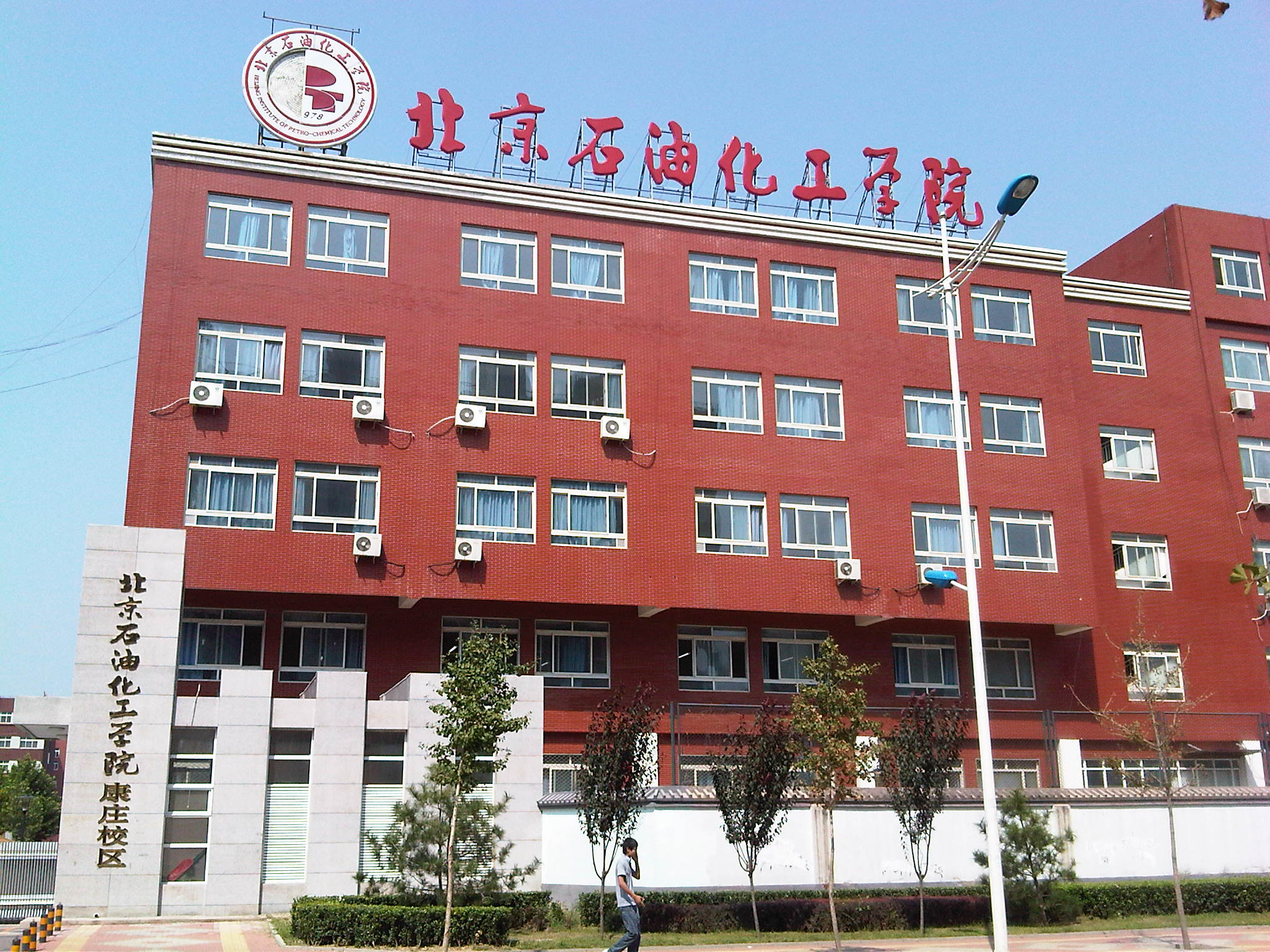
- Beijing Institute of Petrochemical Technology on the west of Qingyuan, 2011

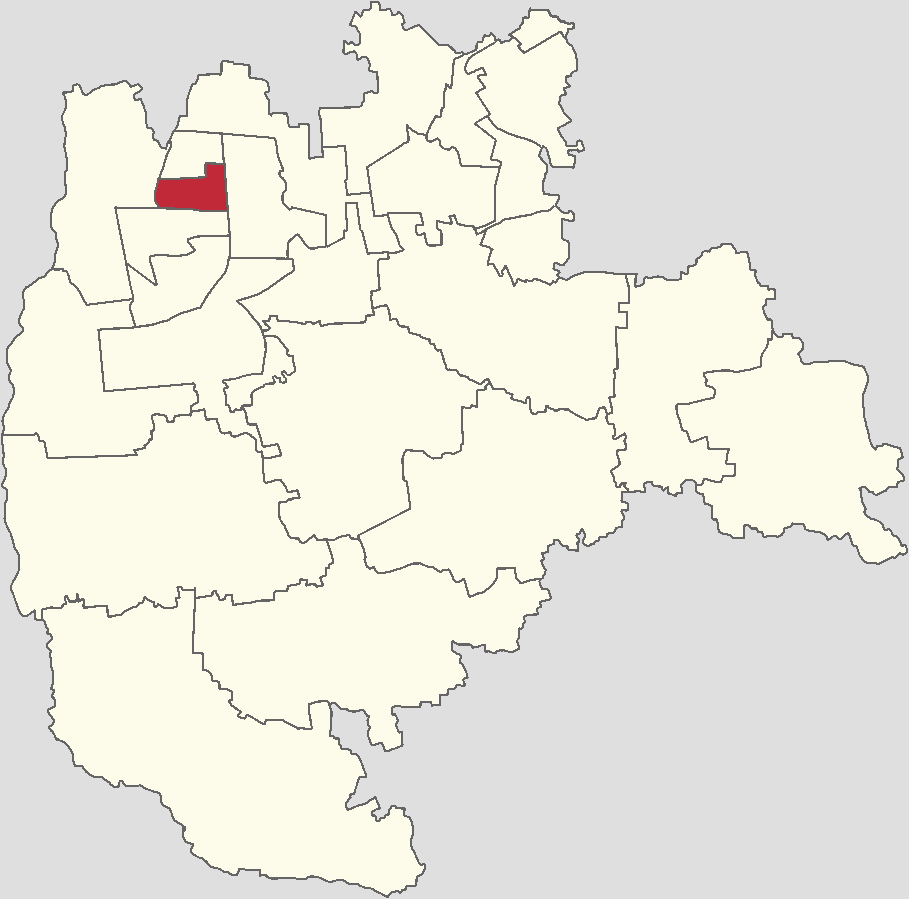
- Location within Daxing District

- Location within Beijing Location within China
- Coordinates: 39°45′01″N 116°20′05″E
- Country: China
- Municipality: Beijing
- District: Daxing
- Village-level Divisions: 24 communities

Area
  - Total: 5.96 km^{2} (2.30 sq mi)
- Elevation: 44 m (144 ft)

Population (2020)
  - Total: 147,810
  - Density: 24,800/km^{2} (64,200/sq mi)
- Time zone: UTC+8 (China Standard)
- Postal code: 102627
- Area code: 010

Qingyuan Subdistrict (Chinese: 清源街道; pinyin: Qīngyuán Jiēdào) is a subdistrict situated within Daxing District, Beijing, China. It is located at the south of Gaomidian Subdistrict, west of Guanyinsi Subdistrict, north of Xingfeng Subdistrict, and east of Huangcun Town. As of 2020, there were a total of 147,810 people residing within the subdistrict.

Its name came from Qingyuan Road on the south of the subdistrict.

== History ==
Timetable of Qingyuan Subdistrict
| Year | Status | Belonged to |
|---|---|---|
| 1912 - 1928 | | Daxing County, Capital Area |
| 1928 - 1937 | | 3rd Prefecture, Hebei |
| 1937 - 1949 | | 5th Prefecture, Hebei |
| 1949 - 1958 | | Tong County, Hebei |
| 1958 - 1996 | | Daxing County, Beijing |
| 1996 - 2001 | Huangcun Residents' Office | Daxing County, Beijing |
| 2001–present | Qingyuan Subdistrict (4 communities on the east were transferred to Guanyinsi Subdistrict in 2009) | Daxing District |

== Administrative divisions ==
As of 2021, Qingyuan Subdistrict was divided into 24 communities:

| Administrative division code | Subdivision names | Name transliteration |
|---|---|---|
| 110115003001 | 滨河西里南区 | Binhe Xili Nanqu |
| 110115003002 | 滨河西里北区 | Binhe Xili Beiqu |
| 110115003003 | 清源西里 | Qingyuan Xili |
| 110115003006 | 丽园 | Liyuan |
| 110115003007 | 兴华园 | Xinghuayuan |
| 110115003008 | 枣园 | Zaoyuan |
| 110115003009 | 枣园东里 | Zaoyuan Dongli |
| 110115003014 | 康顺园 | Kangshunyuan |
| 110115003015 | 滨河东里 | Binhe Dongli |
| 110115003020 | 滨河北里 | Binhe Beili |
| 110115003024 | 枣园东里北区 | Zaoyuan Dongli Beiqu |
| 110115003027 | 丽园南区 | Liyuan Nanqu |
| 110115003028 | 学院 | Xueyuan |
| 110115003029 | 彩虹新城 | Caihong Xincheng |
| 110115003030 | 兴康家园 | Xingkang Jiayuan |
| 110115003033 | 康秀园 | Kangxiuyuan |
| 110115003034 | 康馨园 | Kangxinyuan |
| 110115003037 | 枣园北里 | Zaoyuan Beili |
| 110115003038 | 枣园尚城 | Zaoyuan Shangcheng |
| 110115003039 | 国际港 | Guojigang |
| 110115003040 | 康庄路五十号院 | Kangzhuanglu Wushi Haoyuan |
| 110115003041 | 兴盛街187号院 | Xingshenglu 187 Haoyuan |
| 110115003042 | 兴盛街189号院 | Xingshenglu 189 Haoyuan |
| 110115003043 | 康宜园 | Kangyiyuan |

== See also ==
- List of township-level divisions of Beijing
