= Yufa =

Town located in Beijing, China

Yufa Town 榆垡镇
- Town
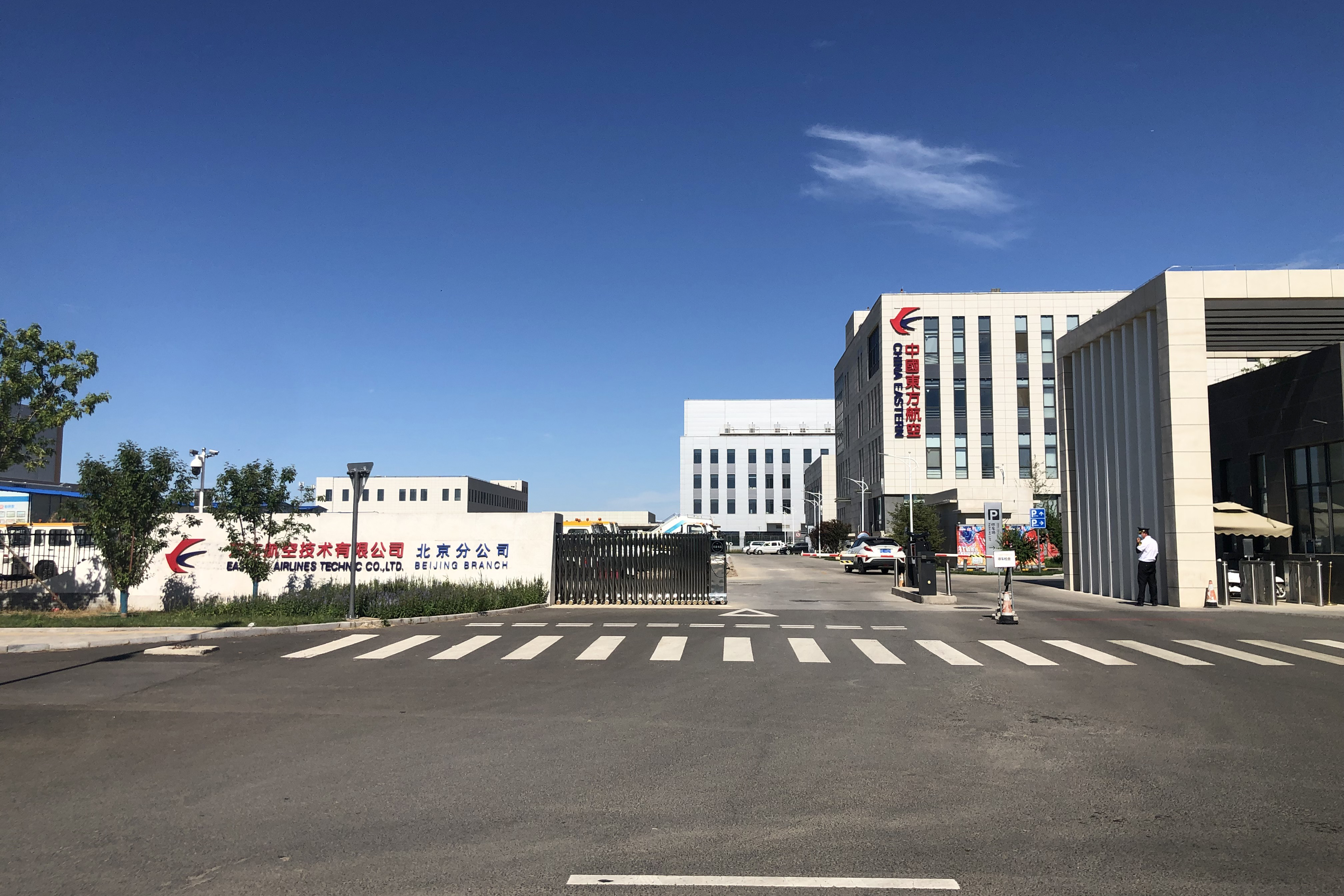
- Eastern Airlines Technic Beijing Branch, 2021

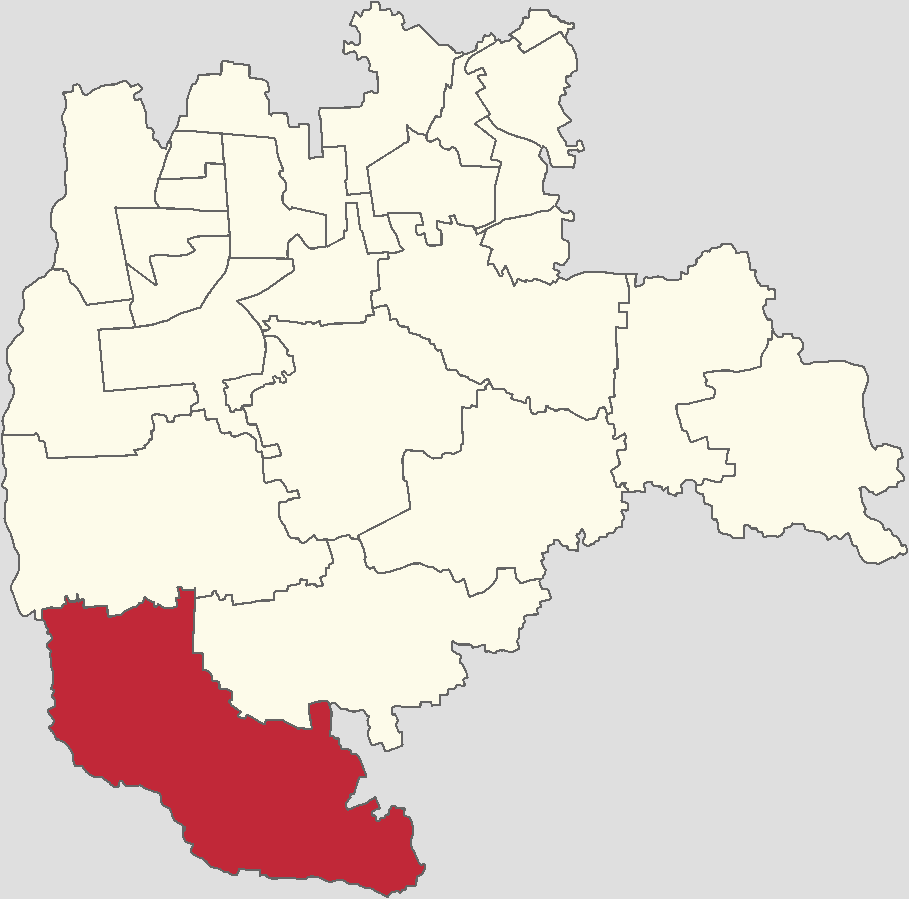
- Location of Yufa Town within Daxing District

- Location within Beijing Location within China
- Coordinates: 39°30′34″N 116°18′34″E
- Country: China
- Municipality: Beijing
- District: Daxing
- Village-level Divisions: 9 communities 47 villages 1 industrial area

Area
  - Total: 134.2 km^{2} (51.8 sq mi)
- Elevation: 31 m (102 ft)

Population (2020)
  - Total: 71,812
  - Density: 535.1/km^{2} (1,386/sq mi)
- Time zone: UTC+8 (China Standard)
- Postal code: 102602
- Area code: 010

Yufa Town (simplified Chinese: 榆垡镇; traditional Chinese: 榆垡鎮; pinyin: Yúfá Zhèn) is a town within Daxing District, Beijing, China. It shares border with Panggezhuang Town in its north, Lixian and Jiuzhou Towns in its east, Gu'an County in its south, and Zhuozhou City in its west. Its population was 71,812 in 2020.

The name Yufa literally translates to "Elm Plough".

== History ==
Timeline of Yufa's History
Year	Status	Belonged to
1949 - 1950	3rd District	Daxing County
1950 - 1953	2nd District	Daxing County
1953 - 1955	6th District (Yufa District)	Daxing County
1955 - 1958	Yufa Township	Daxing County
1958 - 1961	Yufa People's Commune	Daxing County
1961 - 1962	Yufa People's Commune Zhujiawu People's Commune	Daxing County
1962 - 1963	Yufa People's Commune Xiaoheifa People's Commune	Daxing County
1963 - 1983	Yufa People's Commune Nangezhuang People's Commune	Daxing County
1983 - 1990	Yufa Township Nangezhuang Township	Daxing County
1990 - 2000	Yufa Town Nangezhuang Township	Daxing County
2000 - 2001	Yufa Town	Daxing County
2001–present	Yufa Town	Daxing District

== Administrative divisions ==
In the year 2021, 57 subdivisions constituted Yufa Town, where 9 of them were communities, 47 were villages, and 1 was an industrial area:

Administrative division code	Subdivision names	Name transliterations	Type
110115107001	榆垡新城嘉园北里	Yufa Xincheng Jiayuan Beili	Community
110115107002	榆垡新城嘉园南里	Yufa Xincheng Jiayuan Nanli	Community
110115107003	榆垡椿荷墅	Yufa Chunheshu	Community
110115107004	榆垡空港新苑一里	Yufa Konggang Xinyuan Yili	Community
110115107005	榆垡空港新苑二里	Yufa Konggang Xinyuan Erli	Community
110115107006	榆垡空港新苑三里	Yufa Konggang Xinyuan Sanli	Community
110115107007	榆垡空港新苑四里	Yufa Konggang Xinyuan Sili	Community
110115107008	榆垡空港新苑五里	Yufa Konggang Xinyuan Wuli	Community
110115107009	榆垡空港新苑六里	Yufa Konggang Xinyuan Liuli	Community
110115107200	石垡村	Shifa Cun	Village
110115107201	西黄垡村	Xi Huangfa Cun	Village
110115107202	留士庄村	Liushizhuang Cun	Village
110115107203	小黄垡村	Xiao Huangfa Cun	Village
110115107204	履磕村	Lüke Cun	Village
110115107205	刘家铺村	Liujiapu Cun	Village
110115107206	闫家场村	Yanjiachang Cun	Village
110115107207	西麻各庄村	Xi Magezhuang Cun	Village
110115107208	东麻各庄村	Dong Magezhuang Cun	Village
110115107209	邓家屯村	Dengjiatun Cun	Village
110115107210	魏各庄村	Weigezhuang Cun	Village
110115107211	西瓮各庄村	Xi Wenggezhuang Cun	Village
110115107212	东瓮各庄村	Dong Wenggezhuang Cun	Village
110115107213	新桥村	Xinqiao Cun	Village
110115107214	孙各庄村	Sungezhuang Cun	Village
110115107215	景家场村	Jingjiachang Cun	Village
110115107216	辛庄村	Xinzhuang Cun	Village
110115107217	大练庄村	Dalianzhuang Cun	Village
110115107218	黄各庄村	Huanggezhuang Cun	Village
110115107219	榆垡村	Yufa Cun	Village
110115107220	求贤村	Qiuxian Cun	Village
110115107221	太子务村	Taiziwu Cun	Village
110115107222	东庄营村	Dongzhuangying Cun	Village
110115107223	訚家铺村	Yinjiapu Cun	Village
110115107224	西胡林村	Xi Hulin Cun	Village
110115107225	东胡林村	Dong Hulin Cun	Village
110115107226	张家务村	Zhangjiawu Cun	Village
110115107227	十里铺村	Shilipu Cun	Village
110115107234	西张华村	Xi Zhanghua Cun	Village
110115107235	东张华村	Dong Zhanghua Cun	Village
110115107236	南张华村	Nan Zhanghua Cun	Village
110115107237	康张华村	Kang Zhanghua Cun	Village
110115107240	小店村	Xiaodian Cun	Village
110115107242	刘各庄村	Liugezhuang Cun	Village
110115107243	小押堤村	Xiaoyadi Cun	Village
110115107246	辛安庄村	Xin'anzhuang Cun	Village
110115107247	王家屯村	Wangjiatun Cun	Village
110115107248	曹辛庄村	Caoxinzhuang Cun	Village
110115107249	香营村	Xiangying Cun	Village
110115107250	曹各庄村	Caogezhuang Cun	Village
110115107251	辛村	Xin Cun	Village
110115107252	马家屯村	Majiatun Cun	Village
110115107253	西押堤村	Xi Yadi Cun	Village
110115107254	东押堤村	Dong Yadi Cun	Village
110115107255	石佛寺村	Shifosi Cun	Village
110115107256	贾屯村	Jiatun Cun	Village
110115107257	崔指挥营村	Cuizhihuiying Cun	Village
110115107401	榆垡镇	Yufazhen	Industrial Area

== Gallery ==
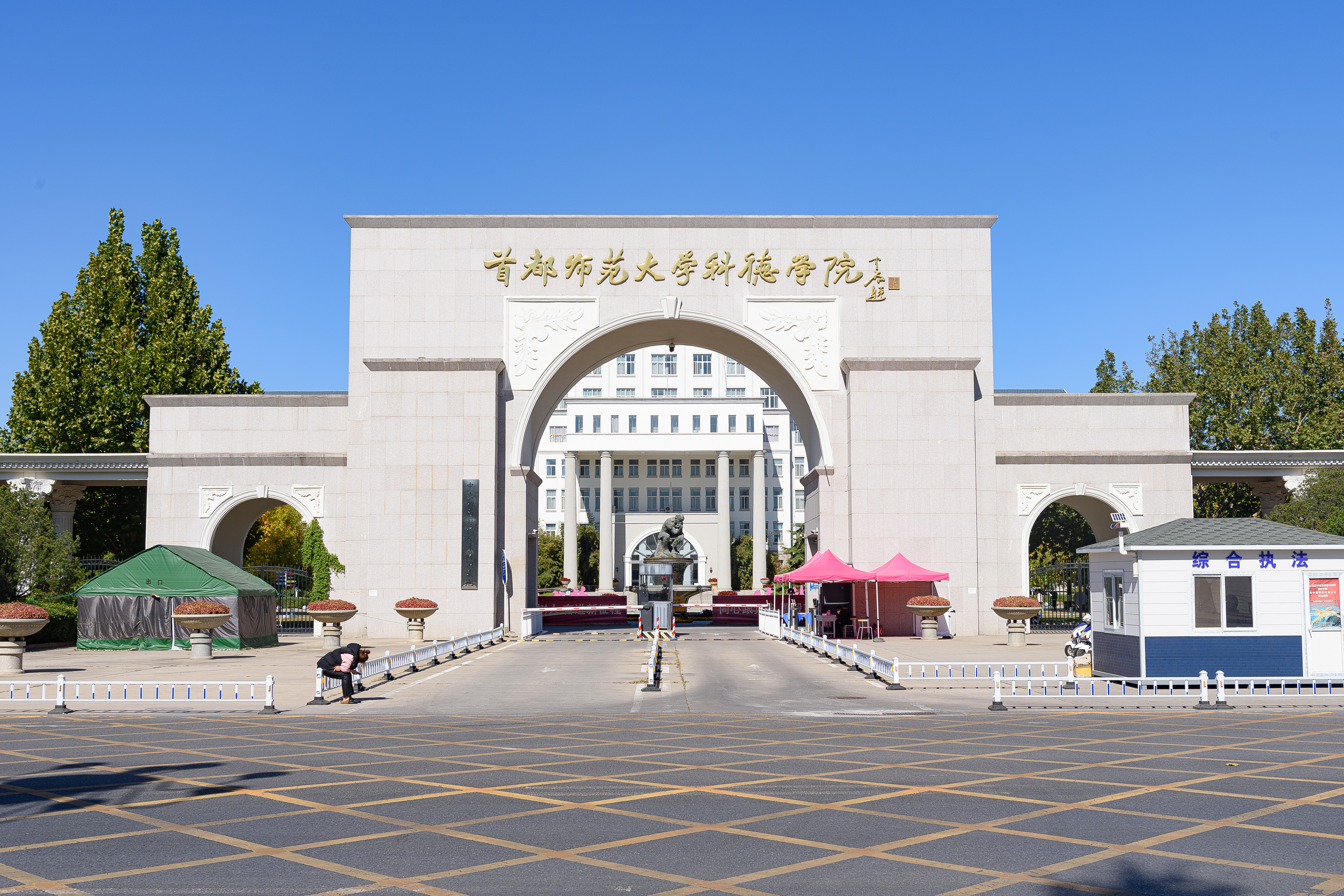
Kede College of Capital Normal University, 2022

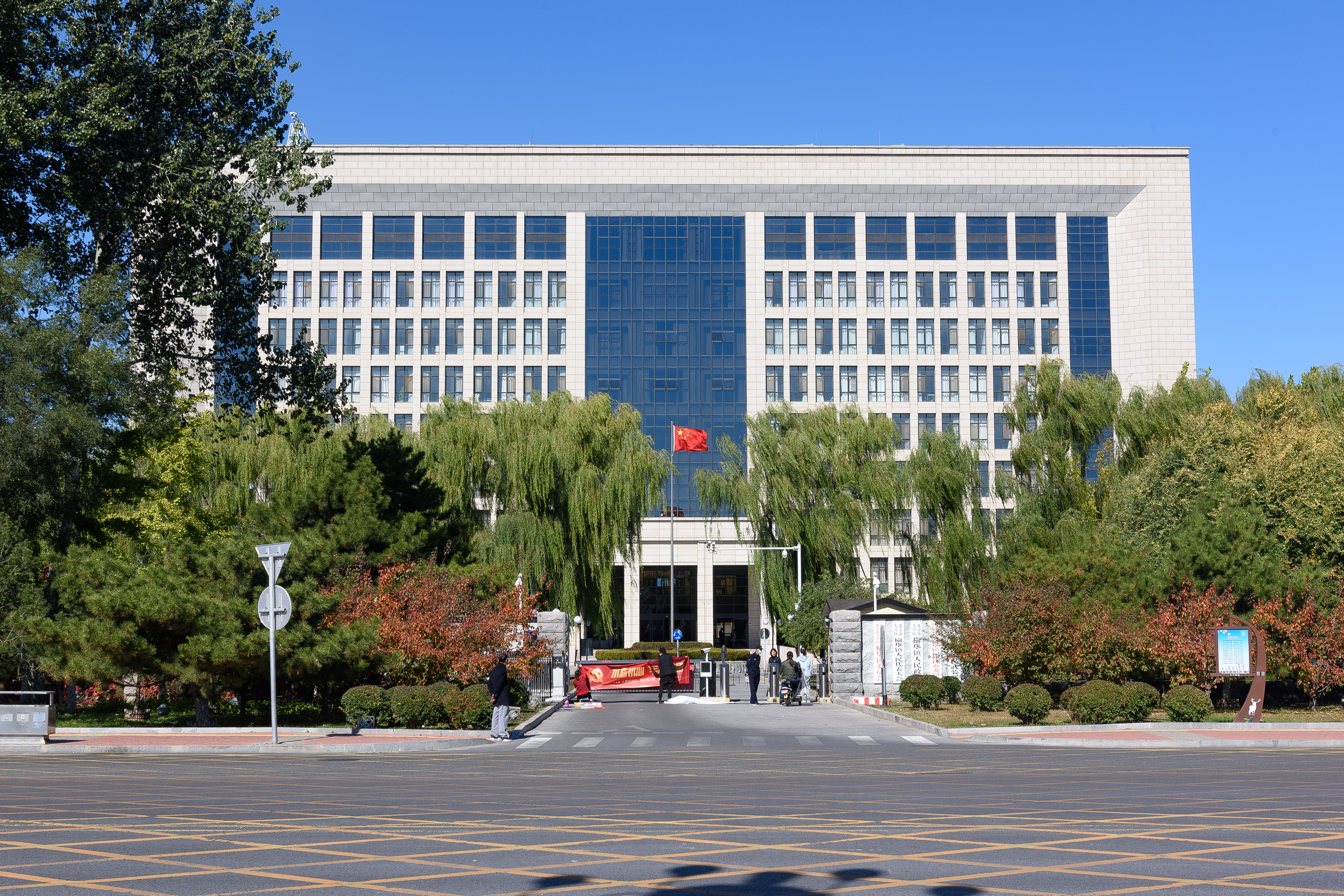
Government of Yufa Town, 2022

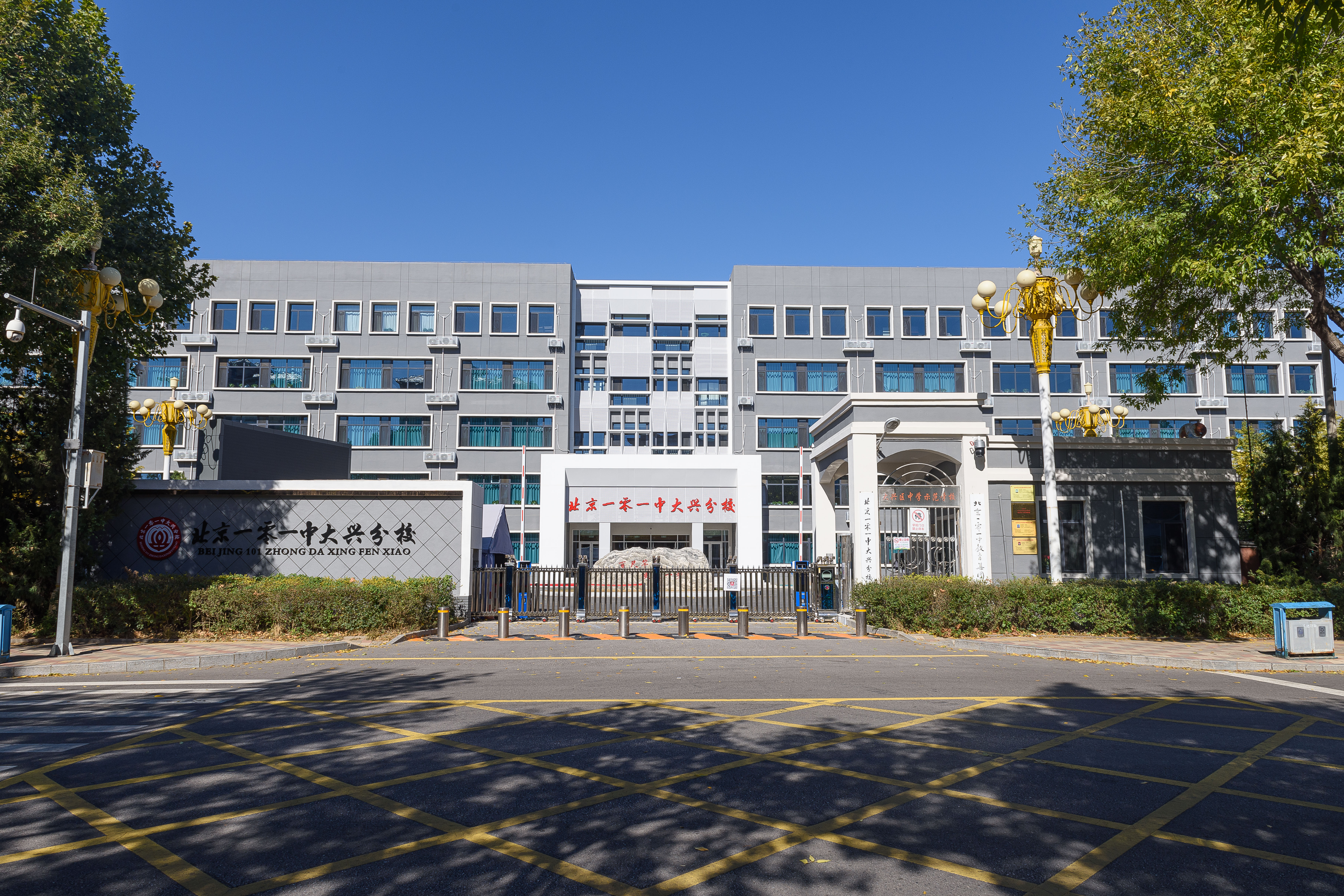
Beijing 101 Middle School Daxing Branch, 2022

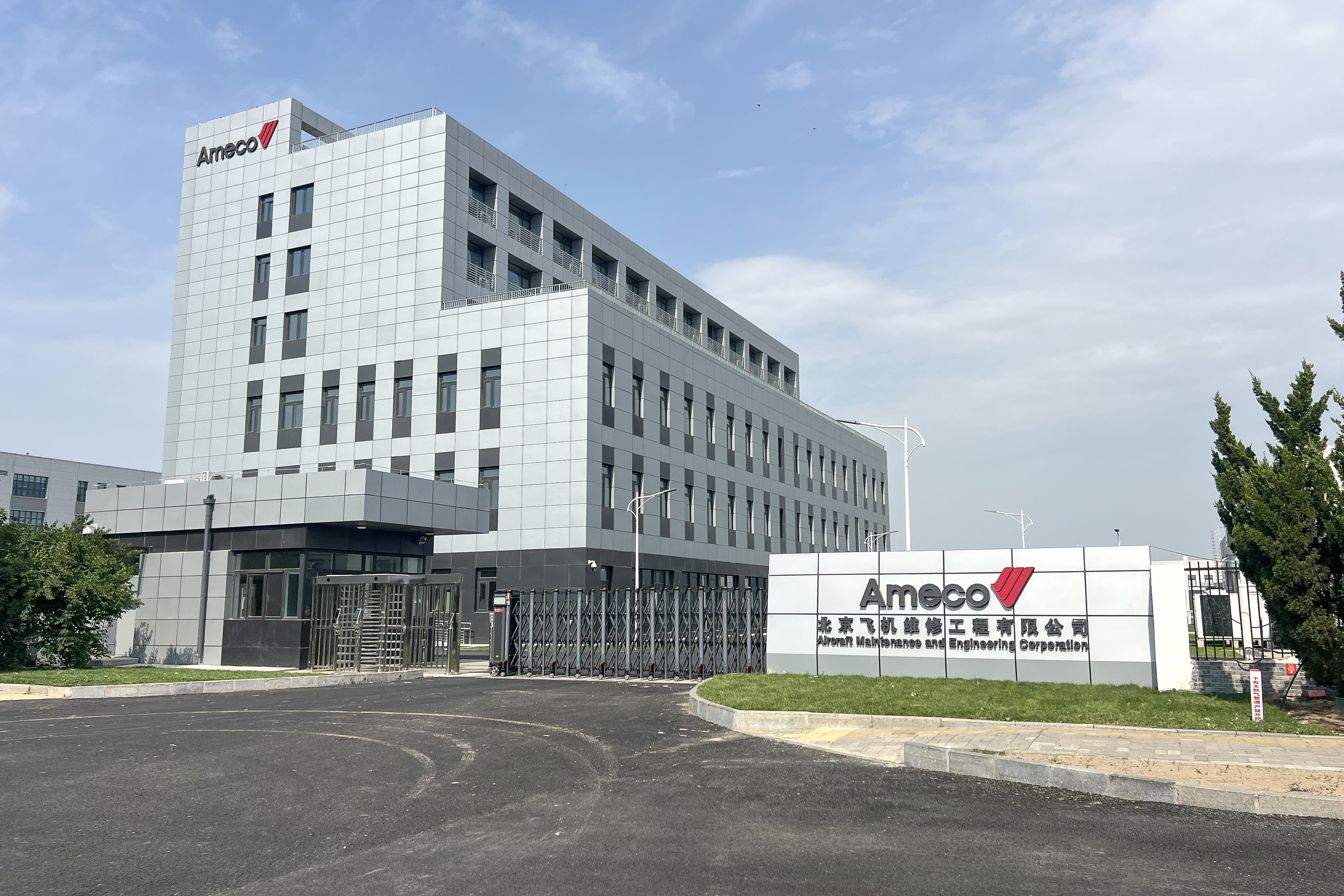
Ameco Beijing Daxing branch, 2025

== See also ==
- List of township-level divisions of Beijing
