= Yang Guang Qing School of Beijing =

High school in Beijing, China

- 北京市阳光情（国际）学校

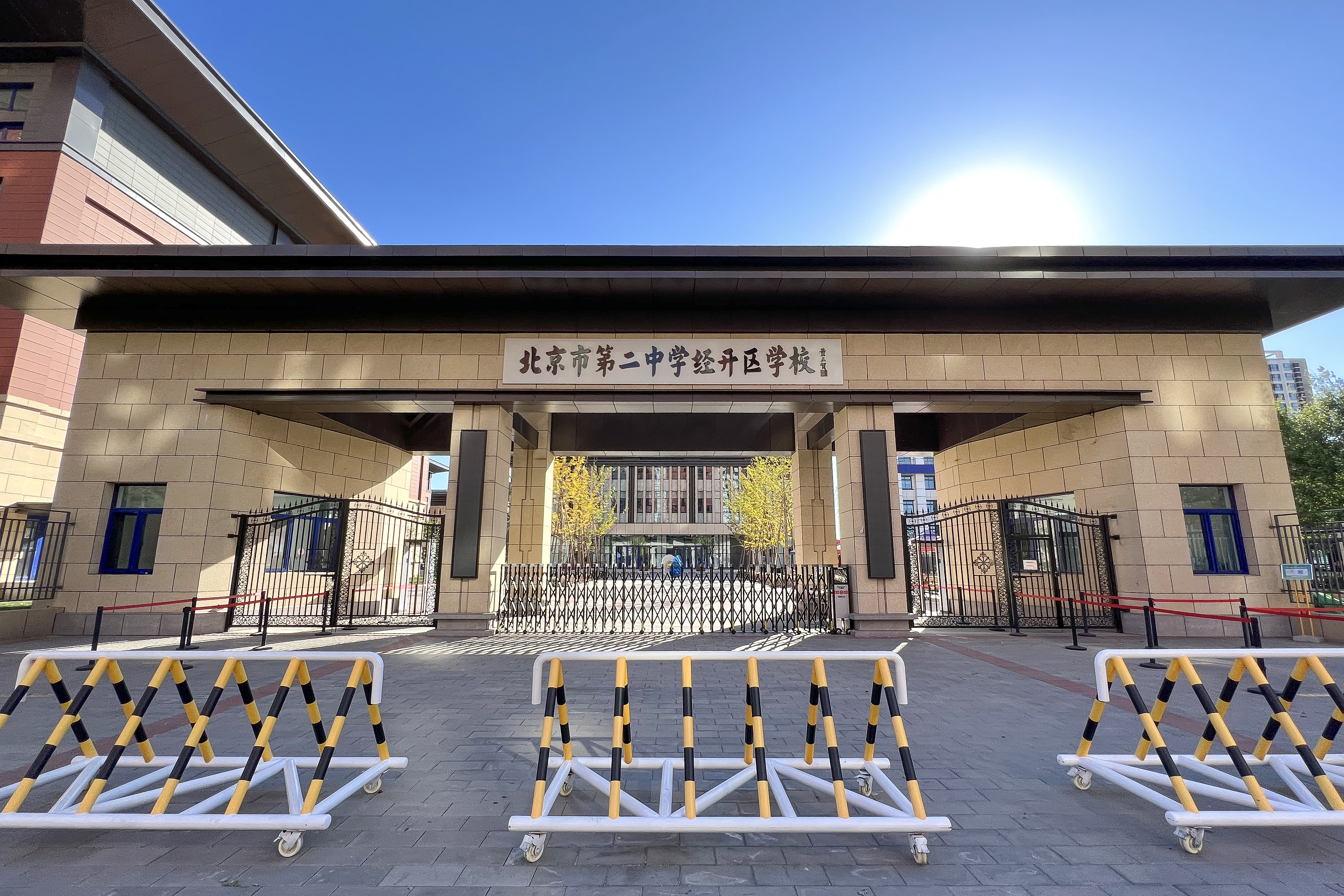

Location
- Intersection of Taihe 2nd St and Boxing 7th Rd, Daxing District, Beijing; China
- Coordinates: 39.7544°N 116.4968°E

Information
- Type: Independent boarding high school
- Founded: 1999; 27 years ago
- Principal: Derrick Berry
- Website: www.ygqschool.com

Yang Guang Qing School of Beijing
- Simplified Chinese: 北京市阳光情（国际）学校
- Traditional Chinese: 北京市陽光情（國際）學校
- Literal meaning: Beijing City Yang Guang Qing (International) School
Transcriptions
Standard Mandarin
- Hanyu Pinyin: Běijīng Shì Yángguāngqíng Guójì Xuéxiào

The Yang Guang Qing School of Beijing, abbreviated to YGQ, is an independent international high school in Beijing, China.

YGQ follows the high school curriculum of Manitoba, Canada to around 130 full-time students who board on site. It is accredited by the Ministry of Education in Manitoba and has a partnership with the Great Lakes College of Toronto. The school teaches a number of subjects, including social studies, humanities, English, maths, science, IT, fine and performing arts, physical education and health.
