= Xingfeng Subdistrict =

Xingfeng Subdistrict 兴丰街道
- Subdistrict
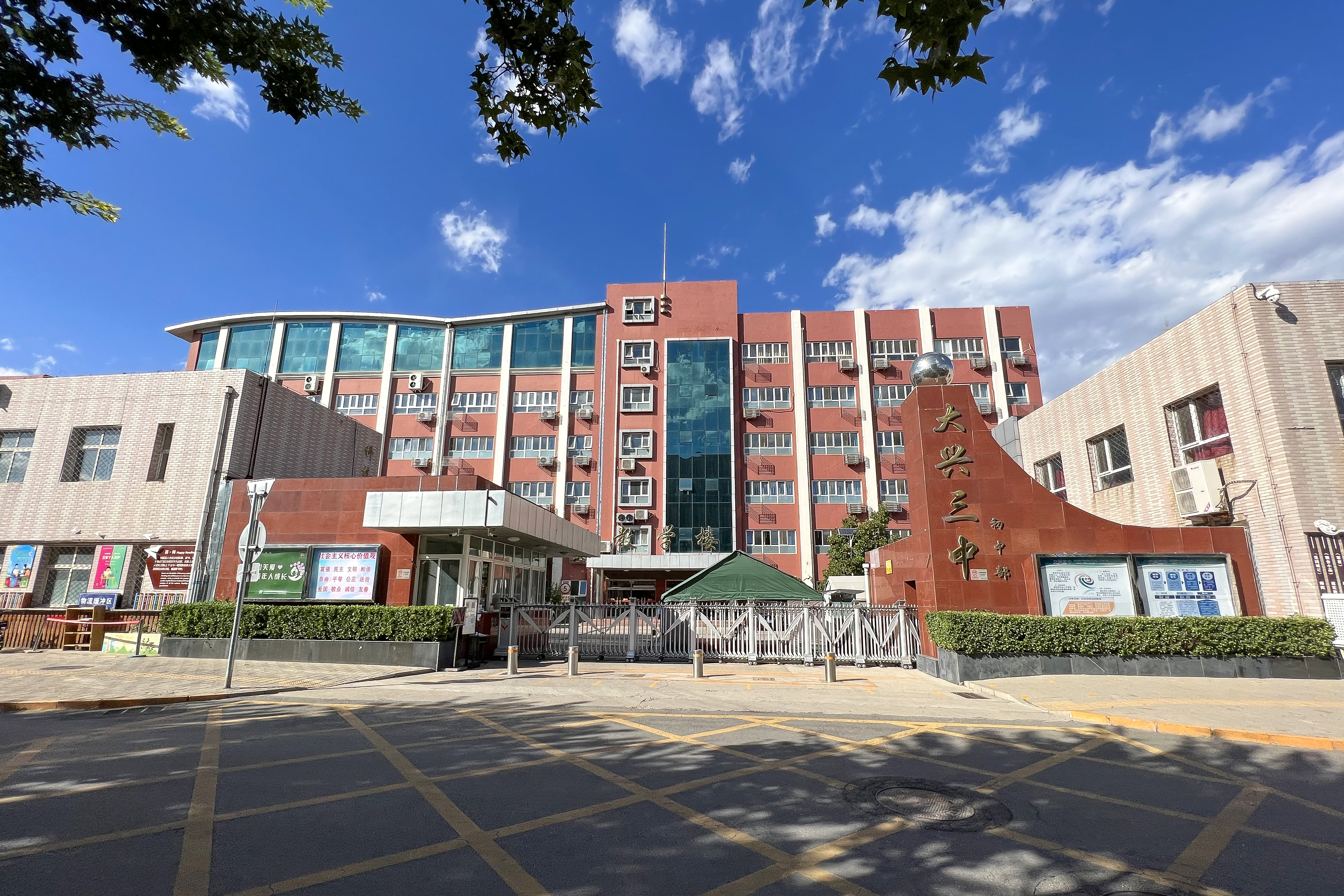
- Junior division of Daxing No.3 Middle School

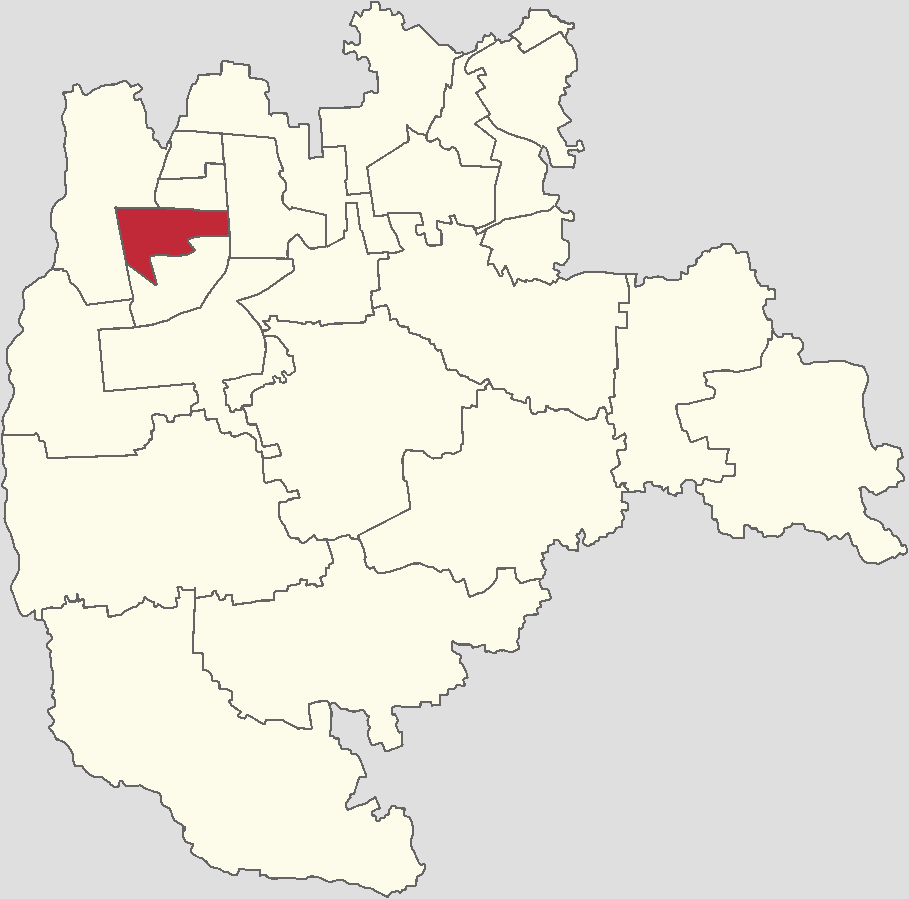
- Location within Daxing District

- Location within Beijing Location within China
- Coordinates: 39°43′50″N 116°19′43″E
- Country: China
- Municipality: Beijing
- District: Daxing
- Village-level Divisions: 17 communities

Area
  - Total: 10.98 km^{2} (4.24 sq mi)
- Elevation: 43 m (141 ft)

Population (2020)
  - Total: 79,851
  - Density: 7,272/km^{2} (18,840/sq mi)
- Time zone: UTC+8 (China Standard)
- Postal code: 102600
- Area code: 010

Xingfeng Subdistrict (simplified Chinese: 兴丰街道; traditional Chinese: 興豐街道; pinyin: Xìngfēng Jiēdào) is a subdistrict in the northwestern portion of Daxing District, Beijing, China. It borders Qingyuan Subdistrict in its north, Guanyinsi Subdistrict in its east, Linxiao Road Subdistrict in its south, and Huangcun Town in its west and north. As of 2020, its population was 79,851.

The name Xingfeng (Chinese: 兴丰; lit. 'Flourish Abundance') came from Xingfeng Avenue, the most prosperous street within the area.

== History ==
Timeline of Xingfeng Subdistrict
Year	Status	Within
1912 - 1928		Daxing County, Capital Area
1928 - 1937		3rd Prefecture, Hebei
1937 - 1949		5th Prefecture, Hebei
1949 - 1958		Tong County, Hebei
1958 - 1996		Daxing County, Beijing
1996 - 2001	Huangcun Residents' Office	Daxing County, Beijing
2001–present	Xingfeng Subdistrict	Daxing District

== Administrative divisions ==
By 2021, Xingfeng Subdistrict covered the following 17 communities:

Administrative division code	Subdivision names	Name transliteration
110115001001	富强西里	Fuqiang Xili
110115001002	富强东里	Fuqiang Dongli
110115001003	黄村西里	Huangcun Xili
110115001004	黄村中里	Huangcun Zhongli
110115001009	兴华中里	Xinghua Zhongli
110115001011	兴华东里	Xinghua Dongli
110115001012	富强南里	Fuqiang Nanli
110115001020	康居	Kangju
110115001022	三合南里	Sanhe Nanli
110115001025	瑞康家园	Ruikang Jiayuan
110115001026	黄村东里	Huangcun Dongli
110115001028	清城北区	Qingcheng Beiqu
110115001029	清城南区	Qingcheng Nanqu
110115001030	三合北里	Sanhe Beili
110115001031	三合中里	Sanhe Zhongli
110115001032	佟馨家园南里	Tongxin Jiayuan Nanli
110115001033	佟馨家园北里	Tongxin Jiayuan Beili

== Gallery ==
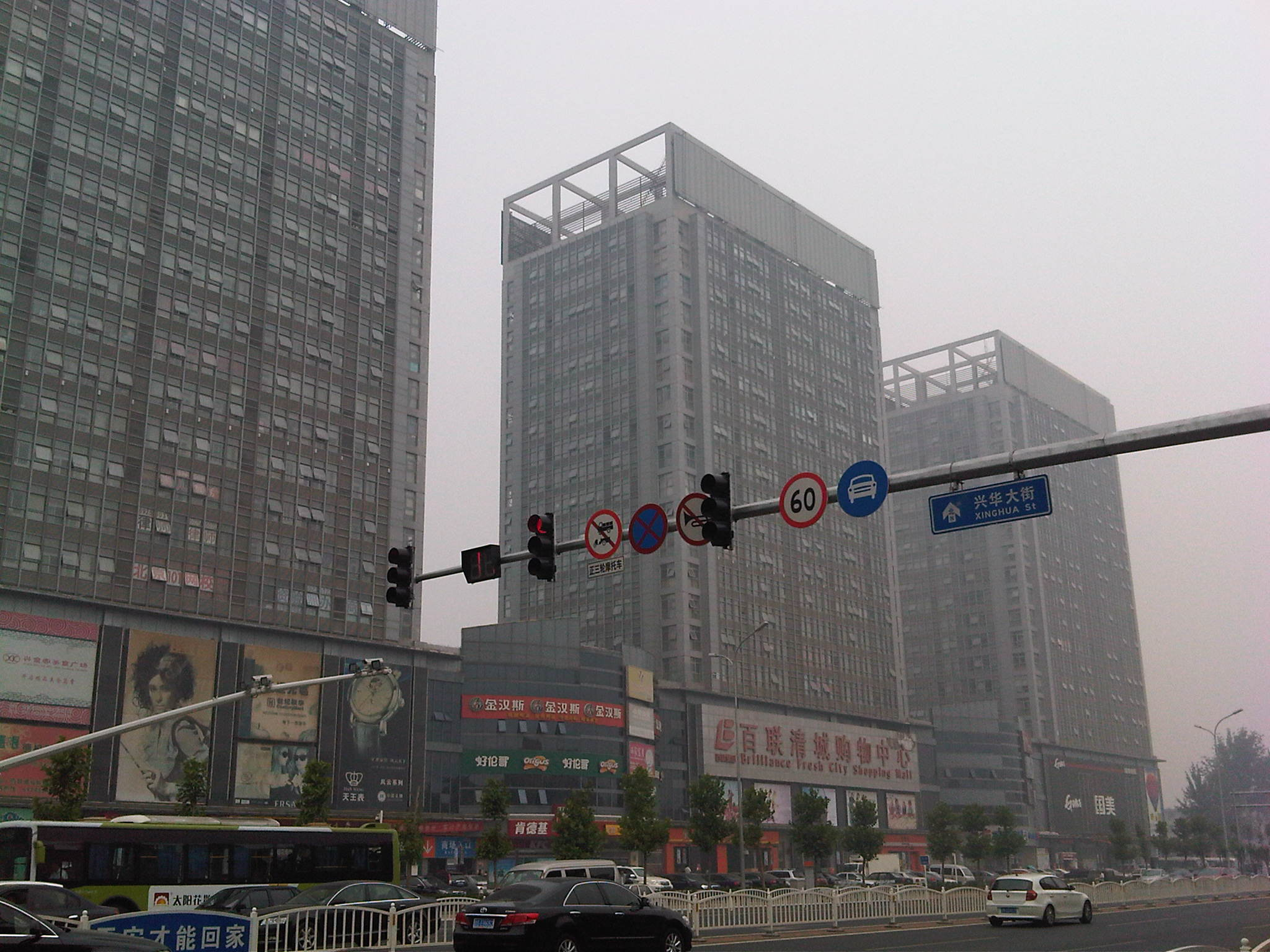
Bailian Qingcheng Mall within the subdistrict, 2011

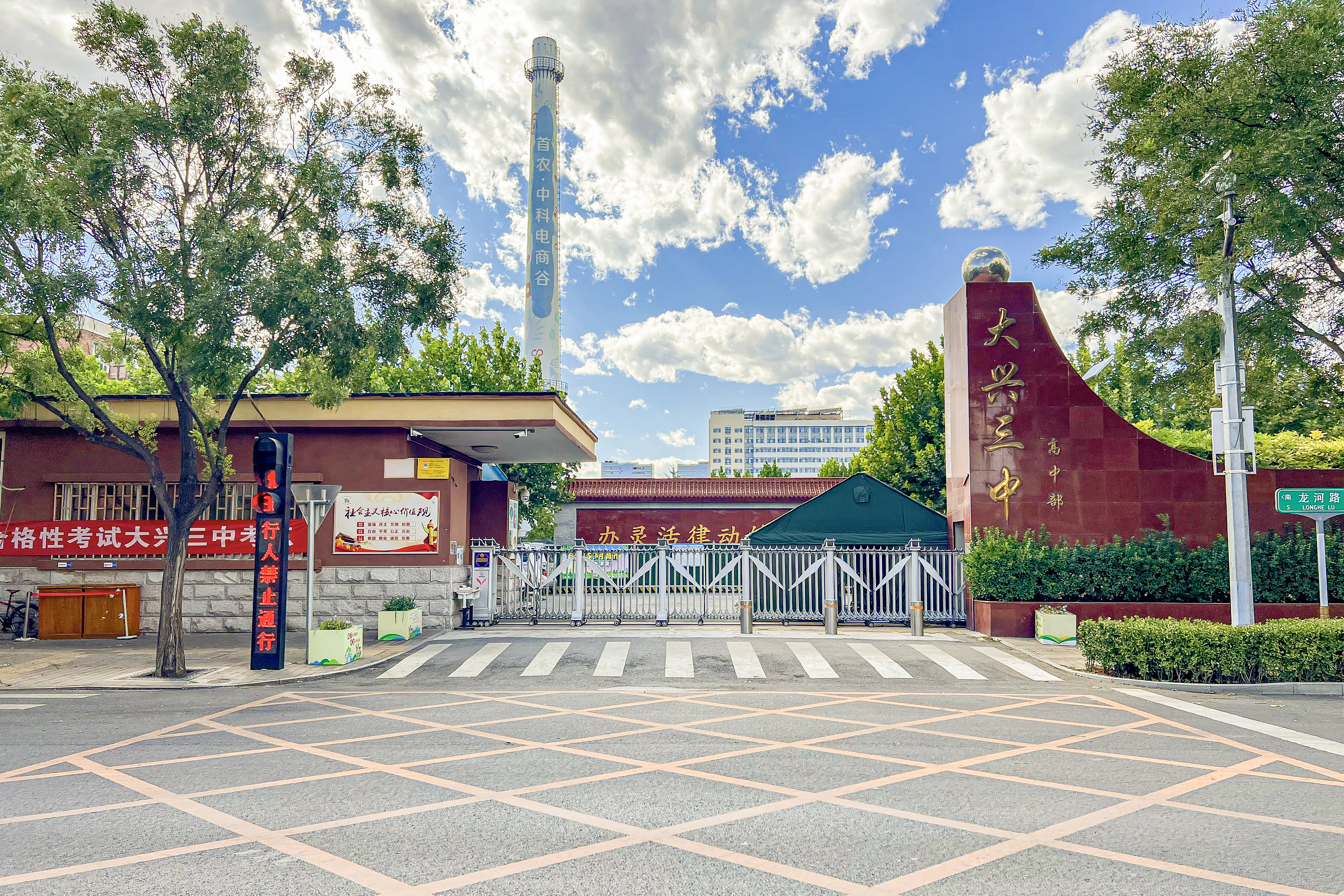
Senior division of Daxing No.3 Middle School, 2022

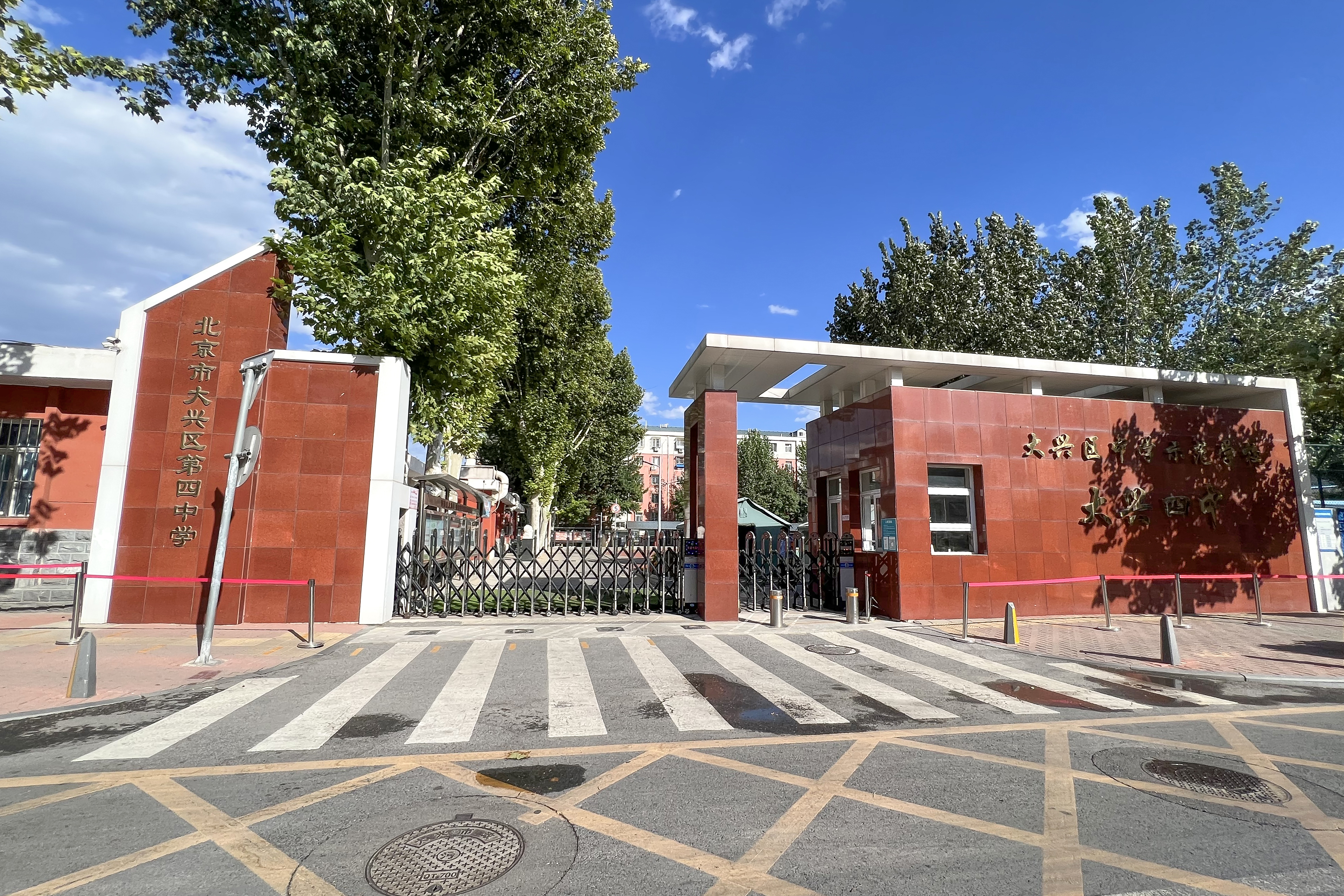
Daxing No. 4 Middle School, 2022

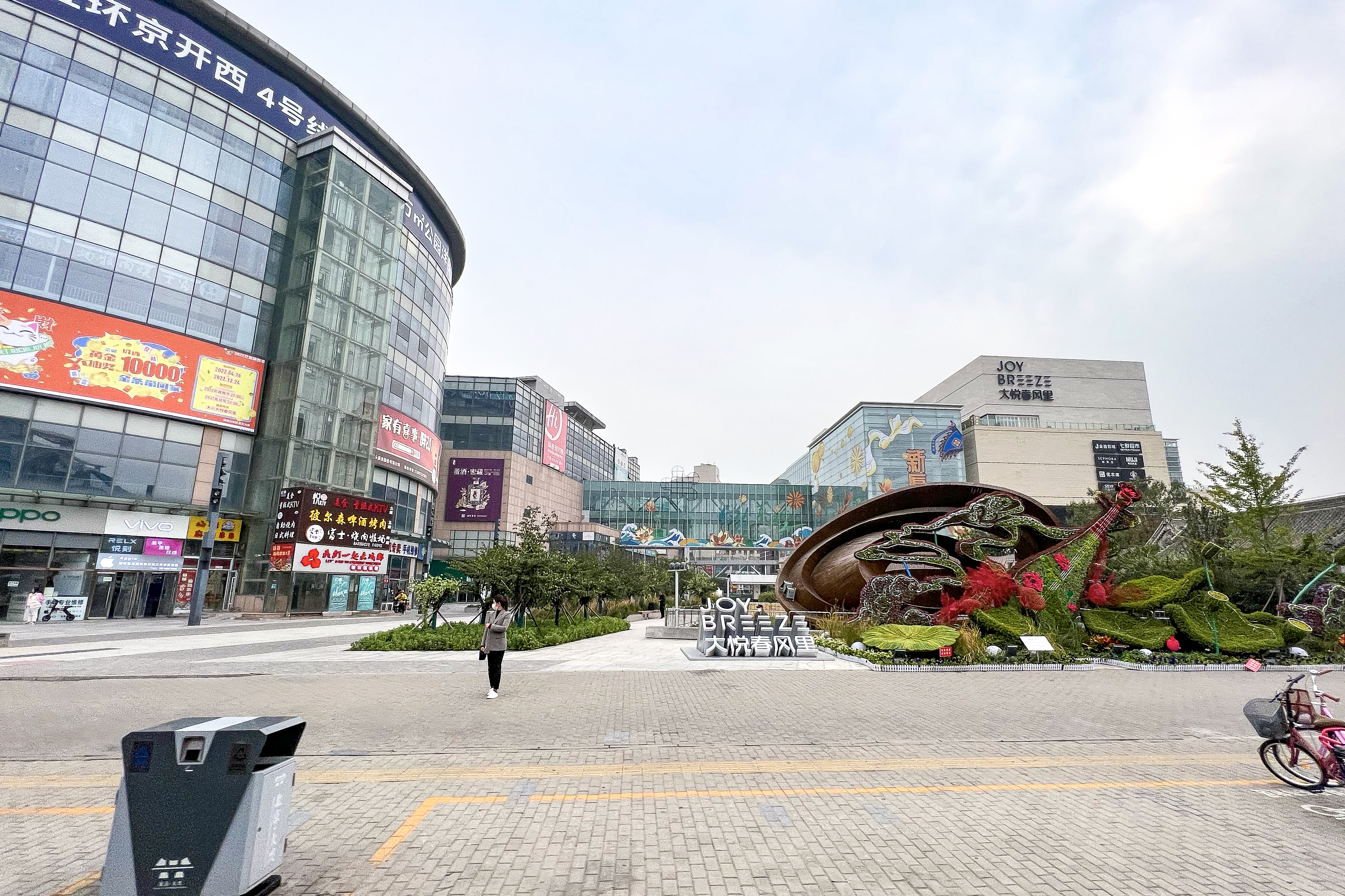
Plaza on the southeast of Xingfeng, 2022

== See also ==
- List of township-level divisions of Beijing
