= Anding, Beijing =

Anding Town 安定镇
- Town
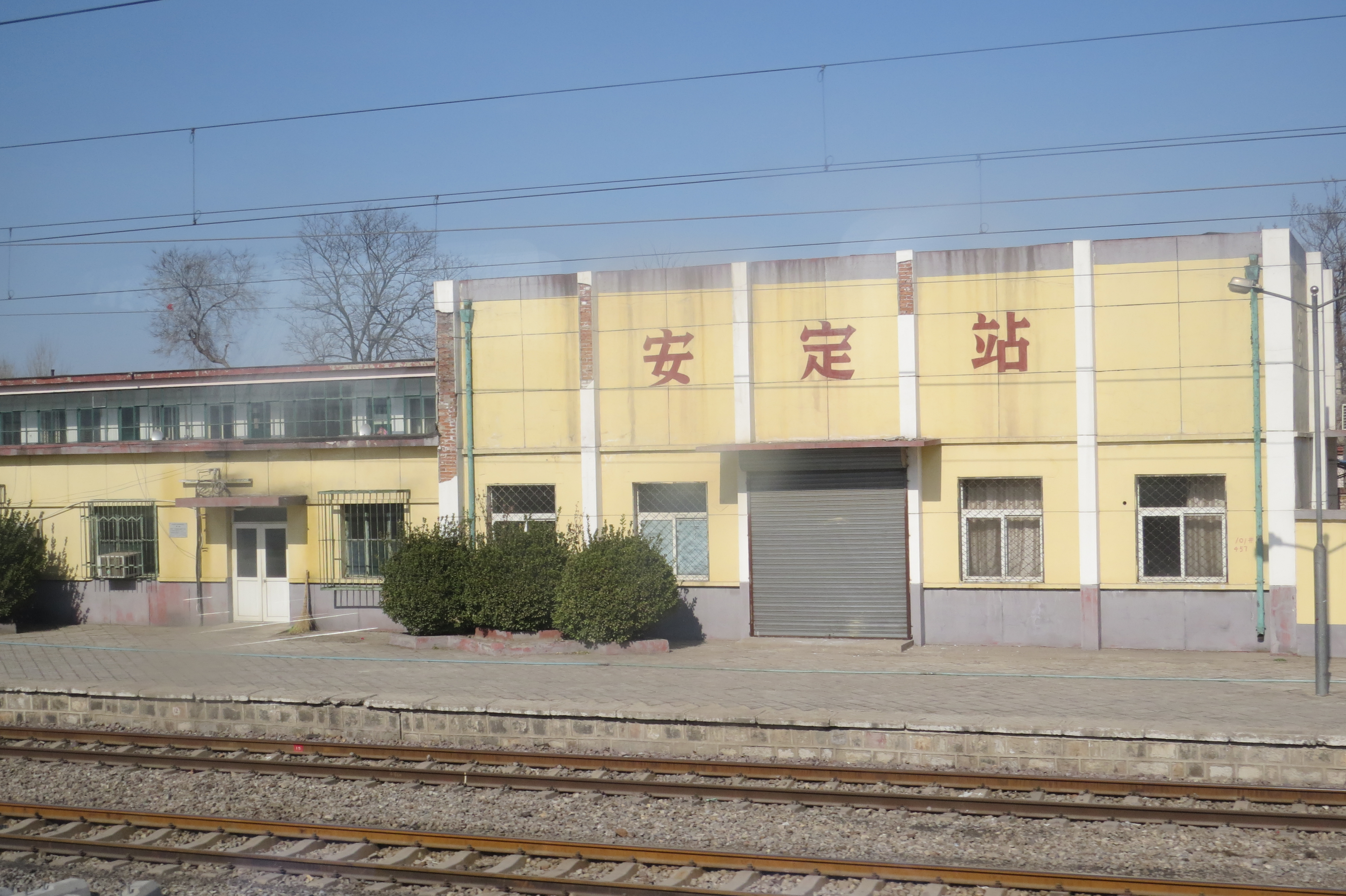
- Anding Railway Station, 2016

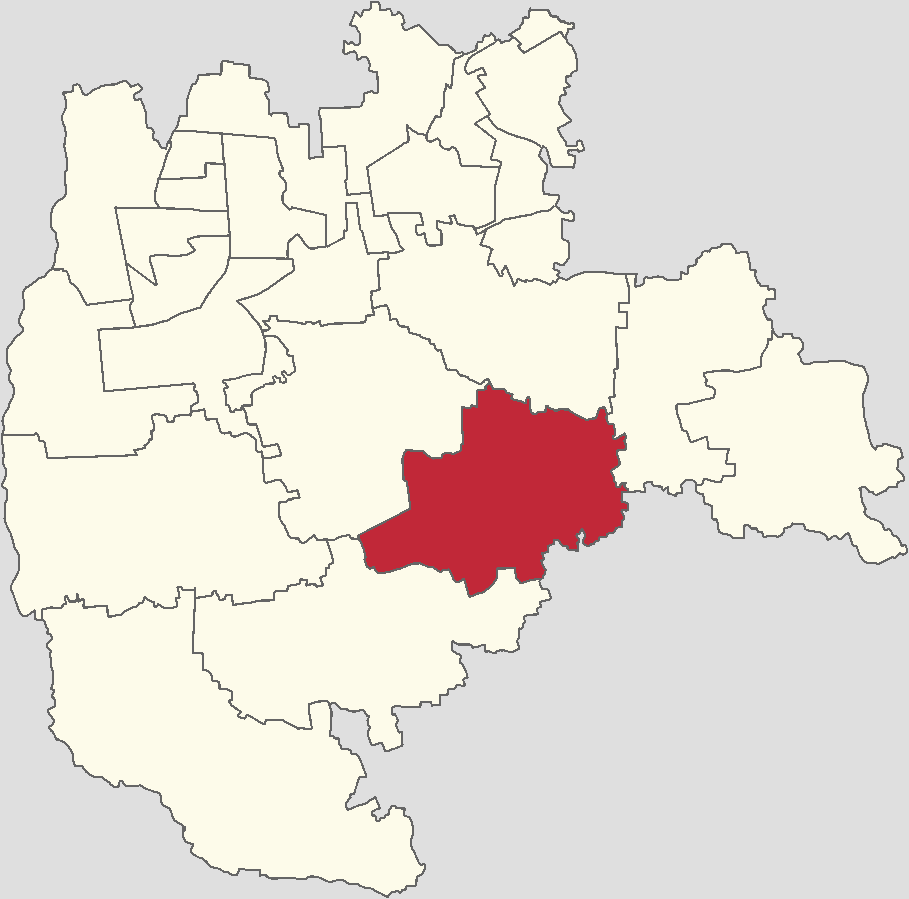
- Location within Daxing District

- Location within Beijing Location within China
- Coordinates: 39°37′02″N 116°29′40″E
- Country: China
- Municipality: Beijing
- District: Daxing
- Village-level Divisions: 33 villages

Area
  - Total: 77.82 km^{2} (30.05 sq mi)
- Elevation: 28 m (92 ft)

Population (2020)
  - Total: 30,764
  - Density: 395.3/km^{2} (1,024/sq mi)
- Time zone: UTC+8 (China Standard)
- Postal code: 102607
- Area code: 010

Anding Town (simplified Chinese: 安定镇; traditional Chinese: 安定鎮; pinyin: Āndìng Zhèn) is a town situated in the southeastern side of Daxing District, Beijing, China. It shares border with Qingyundian Town in the north, Zhangziying and Wanzhuang Towns in the east, Lixian Town in the south, and Weishanzhuang Town in the west. In 2020, it had a population of 30,764.

This town's name literally translates to "Stability", and it was given by the original settlers who were mostly from Shanxi.

== History ==
Timeline of Anding Town
Time	Status	Belonged to
Song and Yuan dynasty	Nanyang Station	
Ming and Qing dynasty	Lixian Inspection Division	Daxing County, Shuntian Prefecture
1948 - 1956	1st District 4th District	Daxing County, Beijing
1956 - 1958	Baita Township Xiaoying Township Dudiantun Township	Daxing County, Beijing
1958 - 1983	Anding People's Commune (Lixian and Weishanzhuang were separated away in 1961)	Daxing County, Beijing
1983 - 1989	Anding Township	Daxing County, Beijing
1989 - 2001	Anding Town	Daxing County, Beijing
2001–present	Anding Town	Daxing District, Beijing

== Administrative divisions ==
As of 2021, Anding Town is formed from the following 33 villages:

Administrative division code	Subdivision names	Name transliterations
110115105200	堡林庄村	Baolinzhuang Cun
110115105201	后安定村	Hou Anding Cun
110115105202	前安定村	Qian Anding Cun
110115105203	沙河村	Shahe Cun
110115105204	站上村	Zhanshang Cun
110115105205	高店村	Gaodian Cun
110115105206	后野厂村	Hou Yechang Cun
110115105207	前野厂村	Qian Yechang Cun
110115105208	杜庄屯村	Duzhuangtun Cun
110115105209	洪士庄村	Hongshizhuang Cun
110115105210	潘家马房村	Panjia Mafang Cun
110115105211	郑福庄村	Zhengfuzhuang Cun
110115105212	驴房村	Lüfang Cun
110115105213	兴安营村	Xing'anying Cun
110115105214	善台子村	Shantaizi Cun
110115105215	西芦各庄村	Xi Lugezhuang Cun
110115105216	东芦各庄村	Dong Lugezhuang Cun
110115105217	车站村	Chezhan Cun
110115105218	汤营村	Tangying Cun
110115105219	伙达营村	Huodaying Cun
110115105220	通洲马坊村	Tongzhou Mafang Cun
110115105221	于家务村	Yujiawu Cun
110115105222	后辛房村	Hou Xinfang Cun
110115105223	前辛房村	Qian Xinfang Cun
110115105224	西白塔村	Xi Baita Cun
110115105225	东白塔村	Dong Baita Cun
110115105226	周园子村	Zhouyuanzi Cun
110115105227	徐柏村	Xubo Cun
110115105228	皋营村	Gaoying Cun
110115105229	马各庄村	Magezhuang Cun
110115105230	佟家务村	Tongjiawu Cun
110115105231	大渠村	Daqu Cun
110115105232	佟营村	Tongying Cun

== Gallery ==
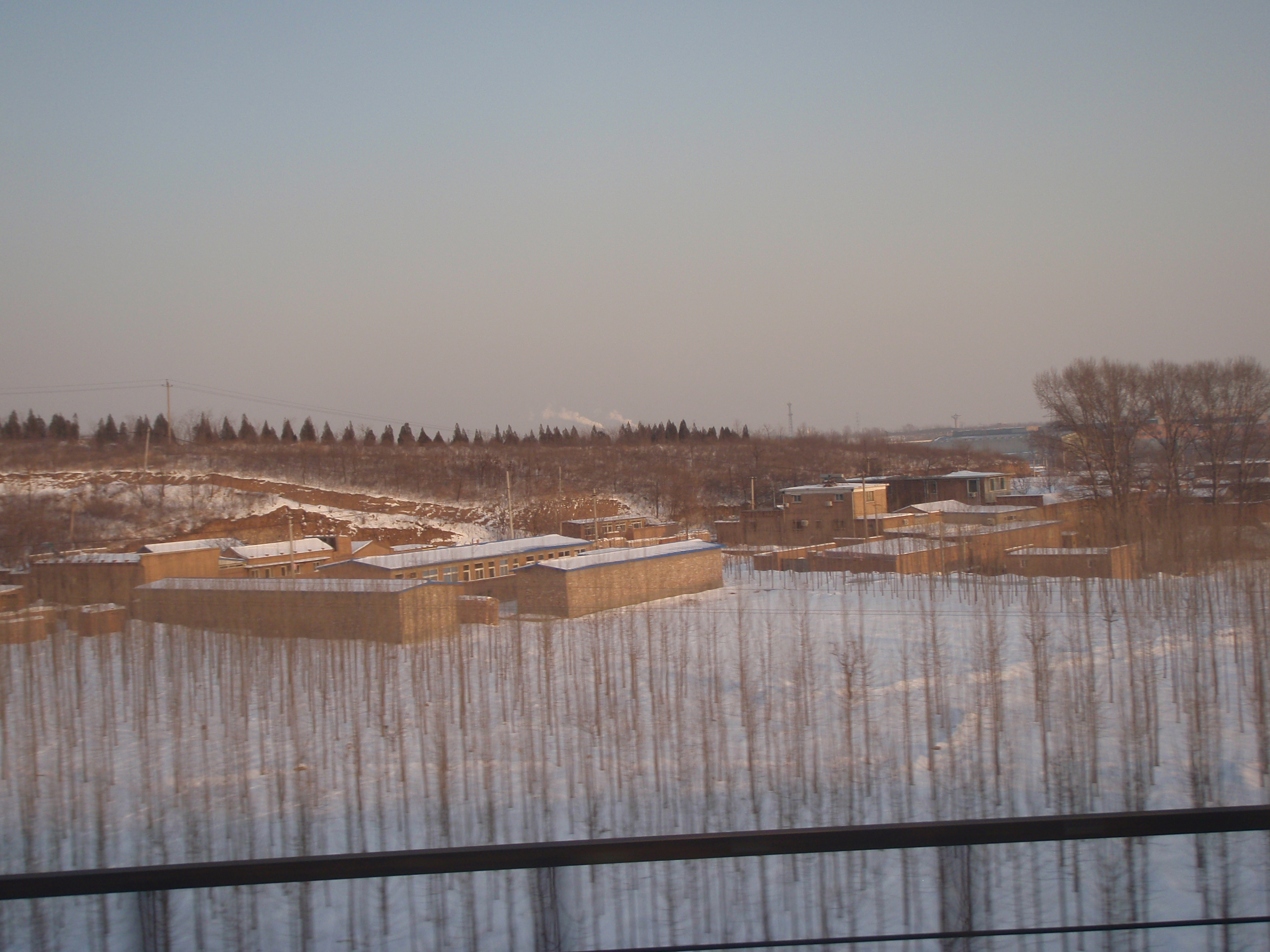
Field of snow southwest of Lüfang Village, 2010

== See also ==
- List of township-level divisions of Beijing
