= National New Media Industry Base =

National New Media Industry Base 国家新媒体产业基地
- Analogous Township-level Units
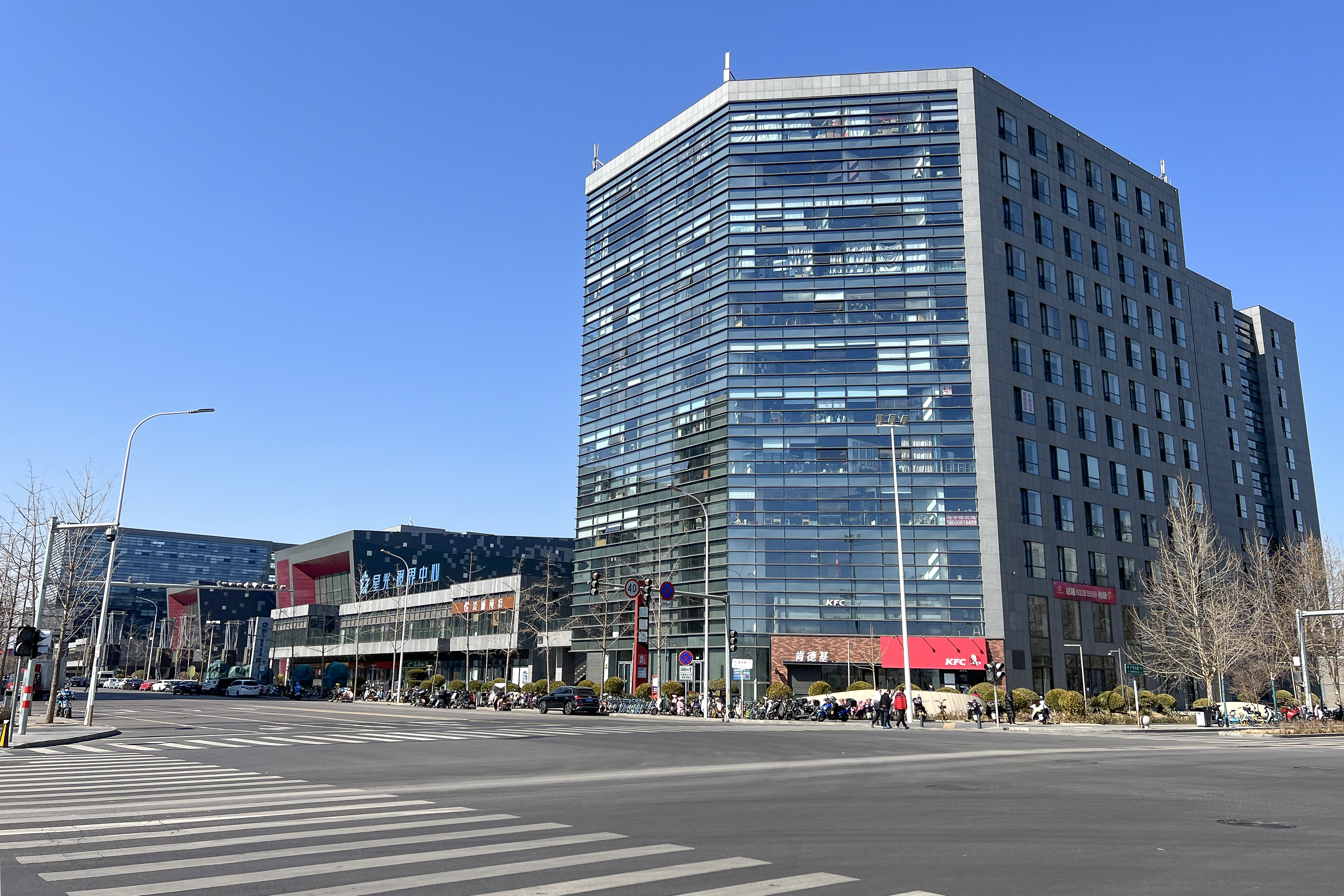

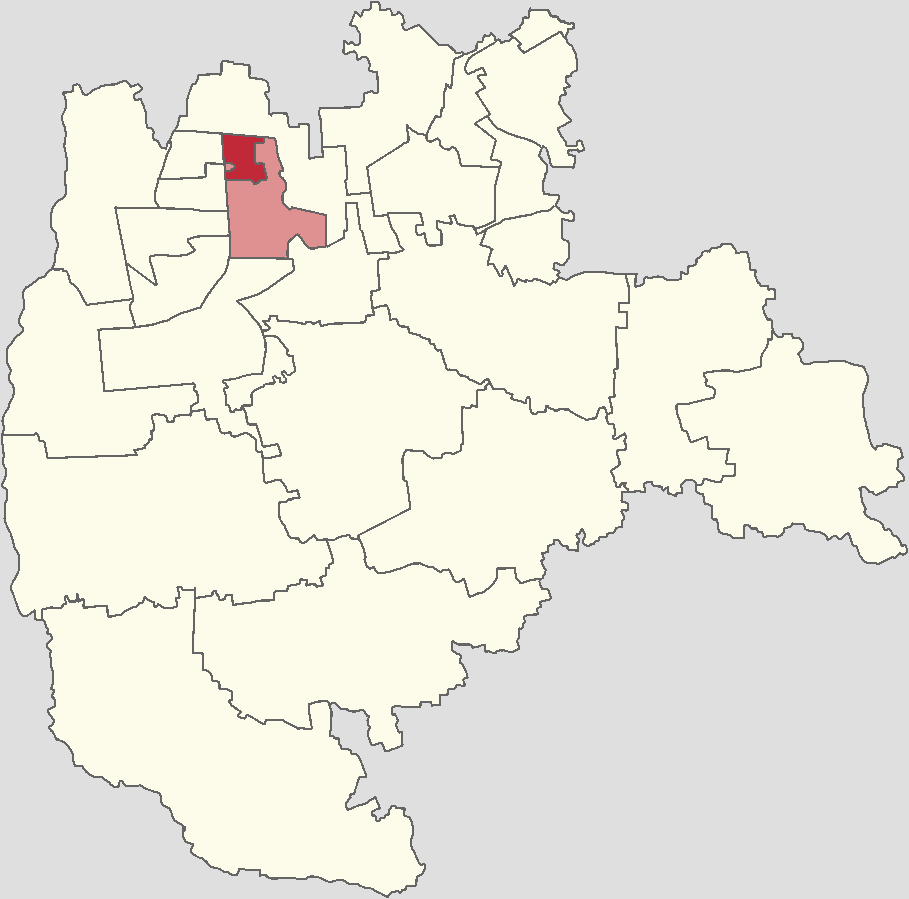
- Location of National New Media Industry Base (red) within Guanyinsi Subdistrict (light red), inside of Daxing District

- Location within Beijing Location within China
- Coordinates: 39°45′49″N 116°19′04″E
- Country: China
- Municipality: Beijing
- District: Daxing

Area
  - Total: 6.83 km^{2} (2.64 sq mi)

Population (2020)
  - Total: 10,201
  - Density: 1,490/km^{2} (3,870/sq mi)
- Time zone: UTC+8 (China Standard)
- Area code: 010

National New Media Industry Base (simplified Chinese: 国家新媒体产业基地; traditional Chinese: 國家新媒體產業基地; pinyin: Guójiā Xīn Méitǐ Chǎnyè Jīdì), is a state-level cultural and technological development zone inside of Guanyinsi Subdistrict, Daxing District, Beijing, China. As of 2020, its census population was 9,827.
