= Xihongmen =

Xihongmen may refer to:

- Xihongmen Station, Beijing Subway, China
- Xihongmen, Beijing, in Daxing District, Beijing, China
