= Xihongmen, Beijing =

Xihongmen Area 西红门地区 Xihongmen Town（西红门镇）
- Area & Town
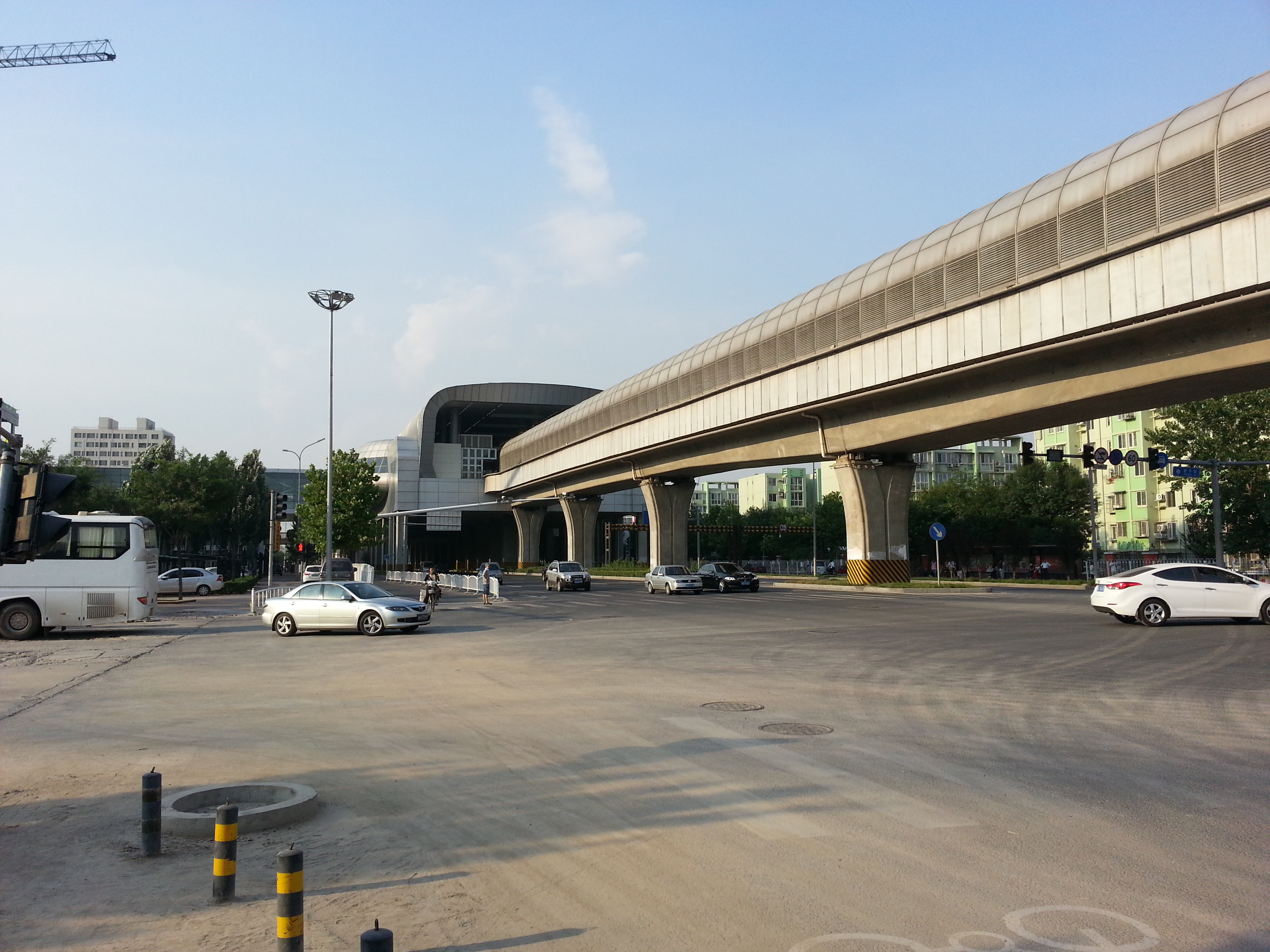
- Xihongmen Station of Beijing Subway, 2013

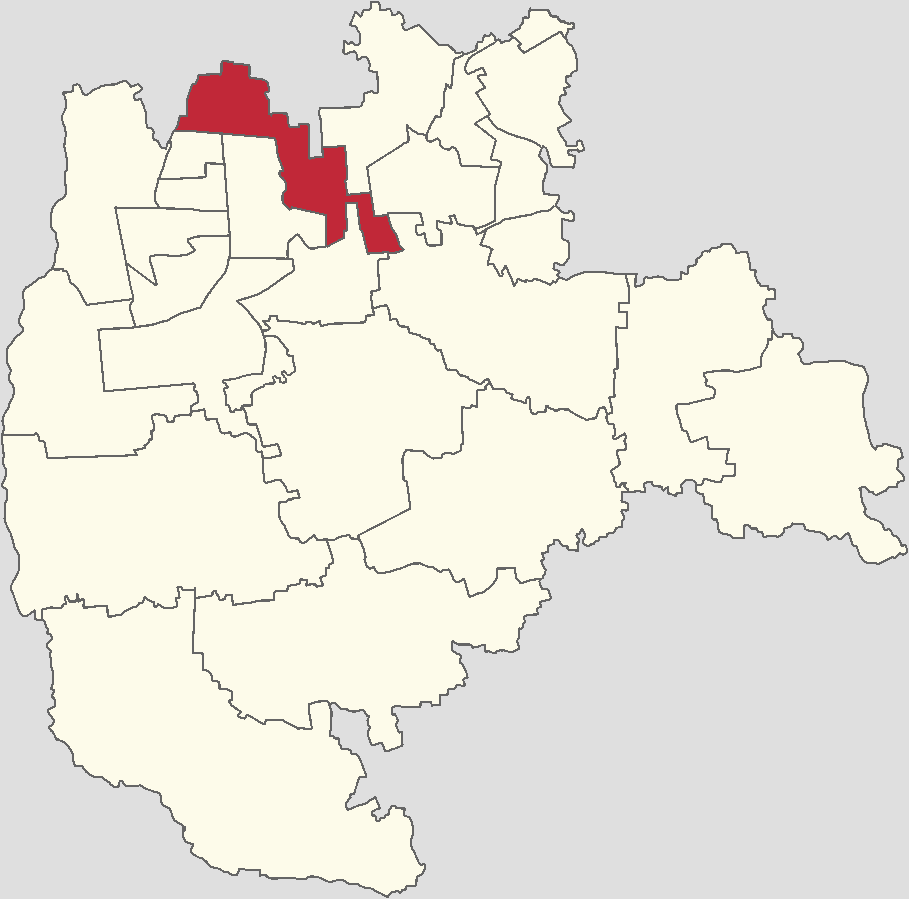
- Location of Xihongmen Area in Daxing District

- Location within Beijing Location within China
- Coordinates: 39°47′21″N 116°20′40″E
- Country: China
- Municipality: Beijing
- District: Daxing
- Village-level Divisions: 20 communities 2 villages 1 industrial area

Area
  - Total: 29.37 km^{2} (11.34 sq mi)
- Elevation: 45 m (148 ft)

Population (2020)
  - Total: 179,974
  - Density: 6,128/km^{2} (15,870/sq mi)
- Time zone: UTC+8 (China Standard)
- Postal code: 102600
- Area code: 010

Xihongmen Area (simplified Chinese: 西红门地区; traditional Chinese: 西紅門地區; pinyin: Xīhóngmén Dìqū) is an area and a town situated on northern Daxing District, Beijing, China. It borders Huaxiang and Nanyuan Subdistricts in its north, Jiugong and Yinghai Towns in its east, Qingyundian and Huangcun Towns in its southeast, as well as Guanyinsi and Gaomidian Subdistricts in its southwest. It was home to 179,974 residents as of 2020.

The region was called Xihongmen (Chinese: 西红门; lit. 'West Red Gate') because of the west gate of Imperial Southern Garden that used to exist within the area during Ming and Qing dynasties.

== History ==
Timeline of Xihongmen Area
Time	Status	Under
Ming and Qing dynasties		Daxing County, Shuntian Prefecture
1946 - 1948		Nanyuan District, Peiping
1948 - 1953		11th District, Peiping (Beijing)
1953 - 1958	Xihongmen Township	Nanyuan District
1958 - 1972	Xihongmen Production Team, a part of Hongxing People's Commune	Nanyuan District
1972 - 1984	Xihongmen Management Area, a part of Hongxing People's Commune	Nanyuan District
1984 - 1990	Xihongmen Township	Nanyuan District
1990 - 1998	Xihongmen Town (Jinxing Township was added in 2000)	Nanyuan District
1998 - 2001	Xihongmen Town (Jinxing Township was added in 2000)	Daxing County
2001 - 2005	Xihongmen Town (Jinxing Township was added in 2000)	Daxing District
2005–present	Xihongmen Area (Xihongmen Town)	Daxing District

== Administrative divisions ==
By the end of 2021, Xihongmen Area comprised 23 subdivisions, of which 20 were residential communities, 2 were villages and 1 was an industrial area:

Administrative division code	Subdivision names	Name transliteration	Type
110115007002	星光	Xingguang	Community
110115007003	九龙	Jiulong	Community
110115007004	福盛	Fusheng	Community
110115007005	福星花园	Fuxing Huayuan	Community
110115007006	绿林苑	Fulinyuan	Community
110115007007	金华园	Jinhuayuan	Community
110115007008	瑞海北区	Ruihai Beiqu	Community
110115007009	瑞海南区	Ruihai Nanqu	Community
110115007010	宏大园	Hongdayuan	Community
110115007011	兴月苑	Xingyueyuan	Community
110115007012	兴日苑	Xingriyuan	Community
110115007013	博苑	Boyuan	Community
110115007014	礼域北区	Liyu Beiqu	Community
110115007015	礼域南区	Liyu Nanqu	Community
110115007016	都市公寓	Dushi Gongyu	Community
110115007017	欣荣	Xinrong	Community
110115007018	欣清	Xinqing	Community
110115007019	宏业东区	Hongye Dongqu	Community
110115007020	宏业西区	Hongye Xiqu	Community
110115007021	同兴	Tongxing	Community
110115007200	西红门一村	Xihongmen Yicun	Village
110115007201	西红门二村	Xihongmen Ercun	Village
110115007202	西红门三村	Xihongmen Sancun	Village
110115007203	西红门四村	Xihongmen Sicun	Village
110115007204	西红门六村	Xihongmen Liucun	Village
110115007205	西红门七村	Xihongmen Qicun	Village
110115007206	西红门八村	Xihongmen Bacun	Village
110115007207	西红门十村	Xihongmen Shicun	Village
110115007208	西红门十一村	Xihongmen Shiyicun	Village
110115007209	西红门十二村	Xihongmen Shi'ercun	Village
110115007210	新三余庄村	Xin Sanyuzhuang Cun	Village
110115007211	老三余庄村	Lao Sanyuzhuang Cun	Village
110115007212	寿保庄村	Shoubaozhuang Cun	Village
110115007213	大白楼村	Dabailou Cun	Village
110115007214	大生庄村	Dashengzhuang Cun	Village
110115007215	金星庄村	Jinxingzhuang Cun	Village
110115007216	志远庄村	Zhiyuanzhuang Cun	Village
110115007217	建新庄村	Jianxinzhuang Cun	Village
110115007218	团河北村	Tuanhebei Cun	Village
110115007219	团河南村	Tuanhenan Cun	Village
110115007220	振亚庄村	Zhenyazhuang Cun	Village
110115007225	小白楼村	Xiaobailou Cun	Village
110115007401	西红门镇新建	Xihongmenzhen Xinjian	Industrial Area

== Gallery ==
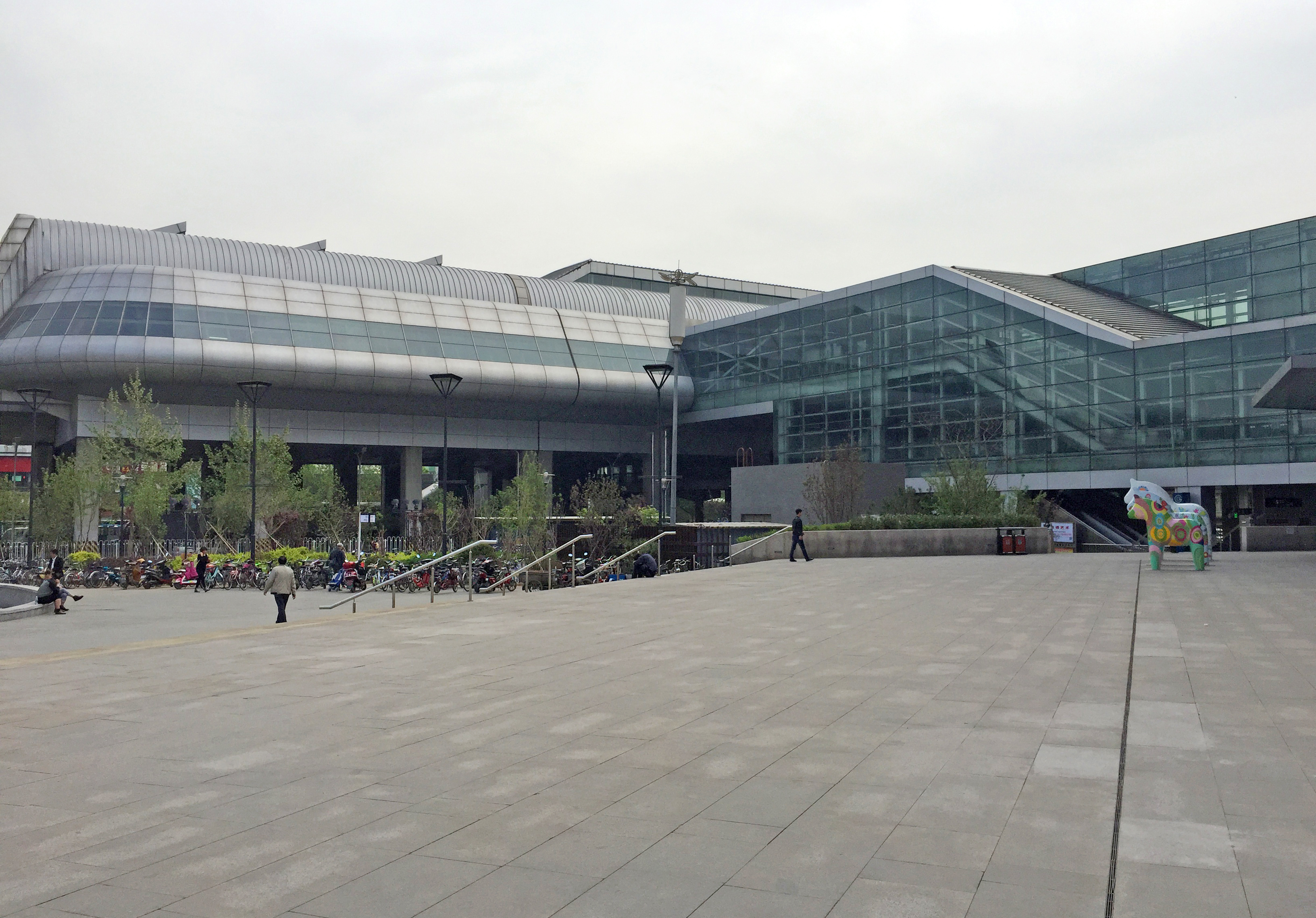
Xihongmen Station of Beijing Subway, 2015

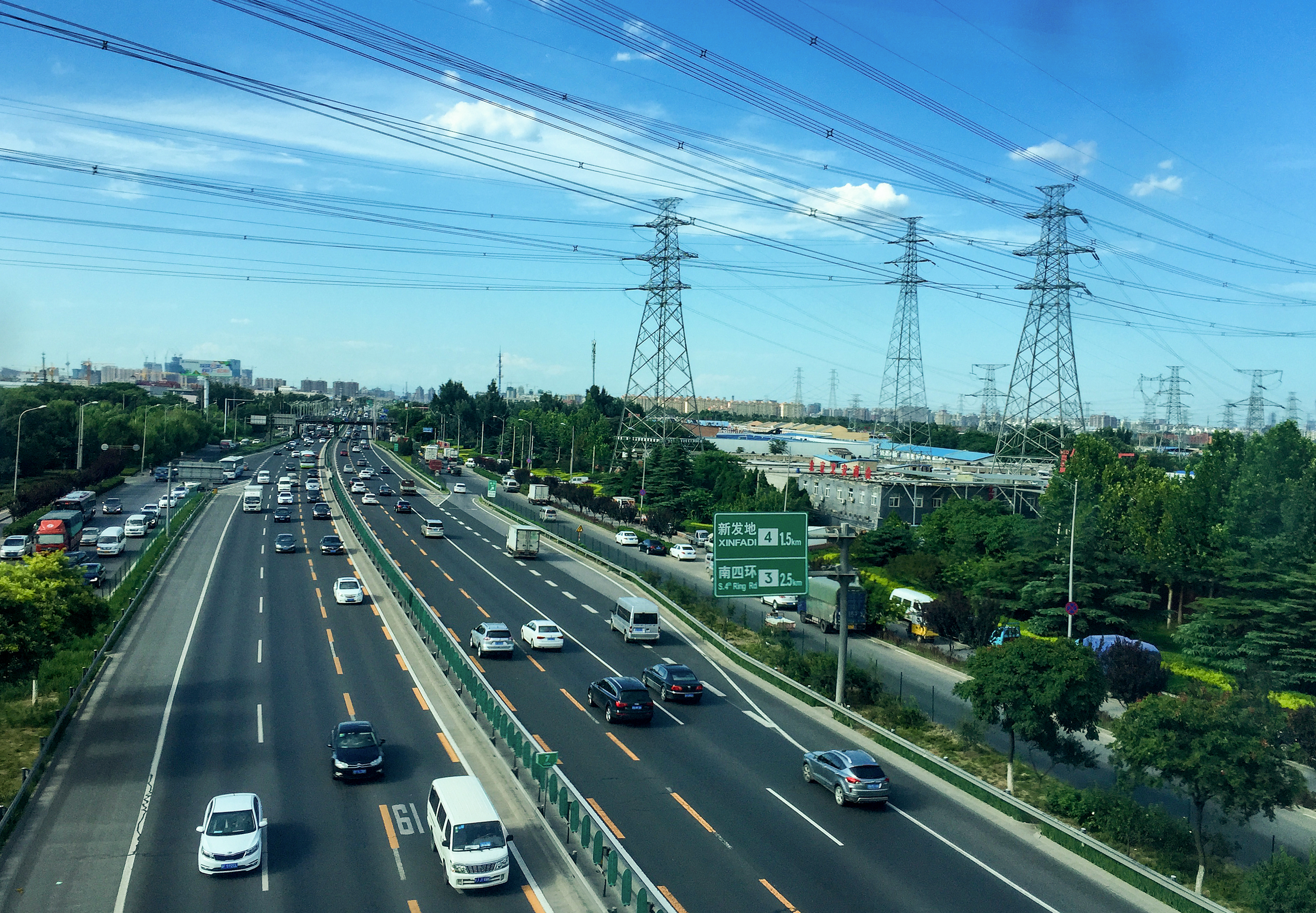
Jingkai Expressway on the east of the area, 2017

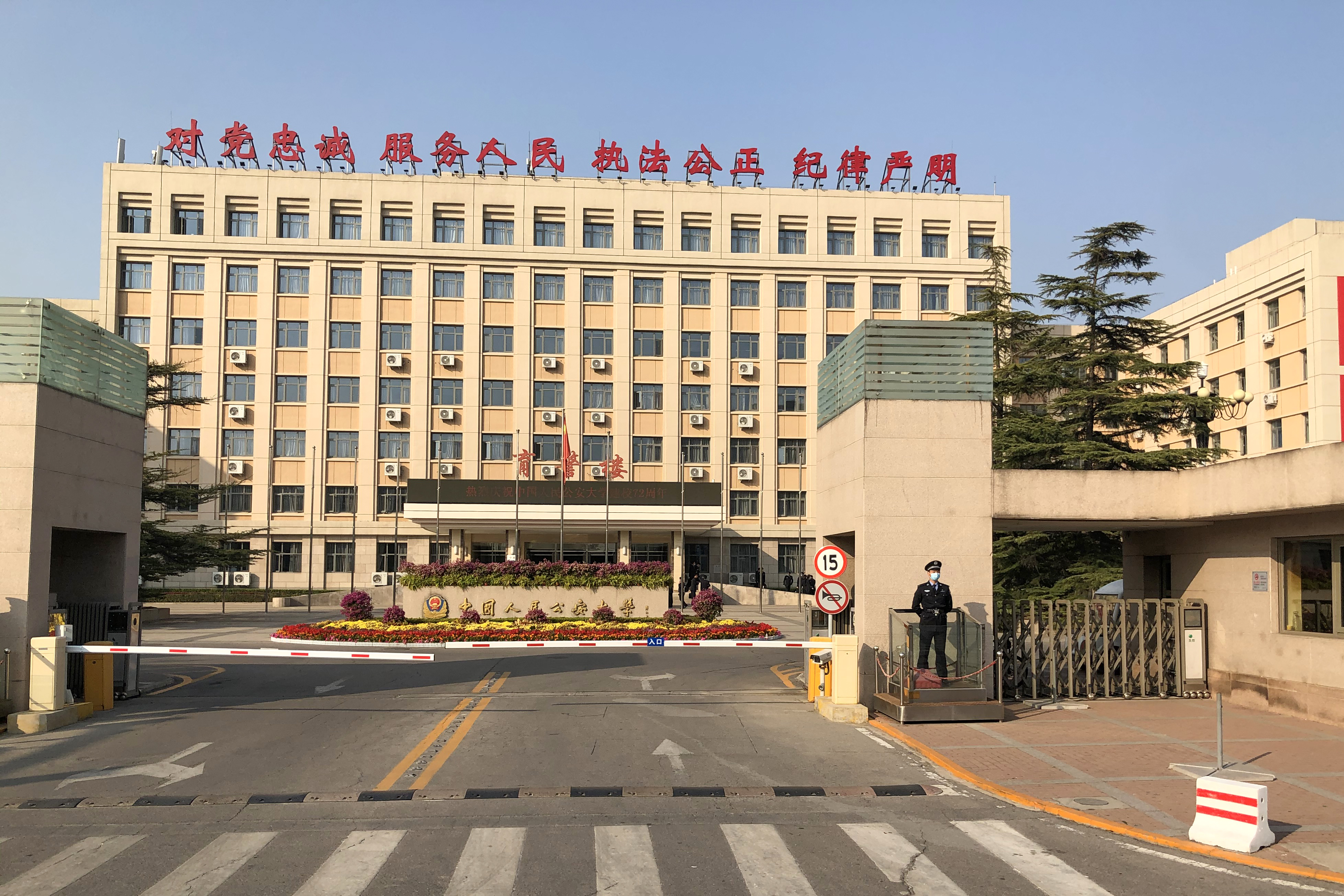
Tuanhe Campus of People's Public Security University of China, 2020

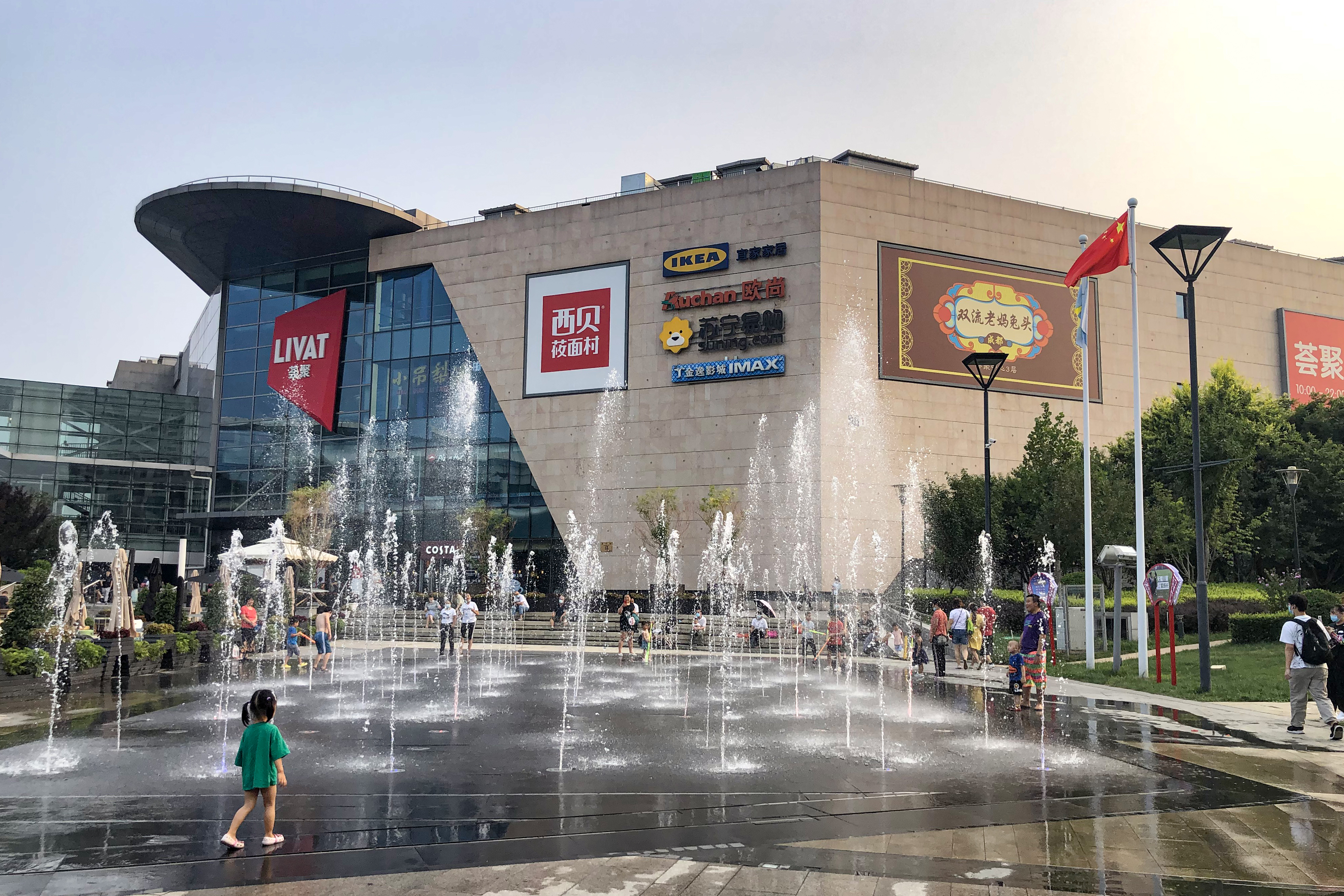
LIVAT Shopping Center, 2020

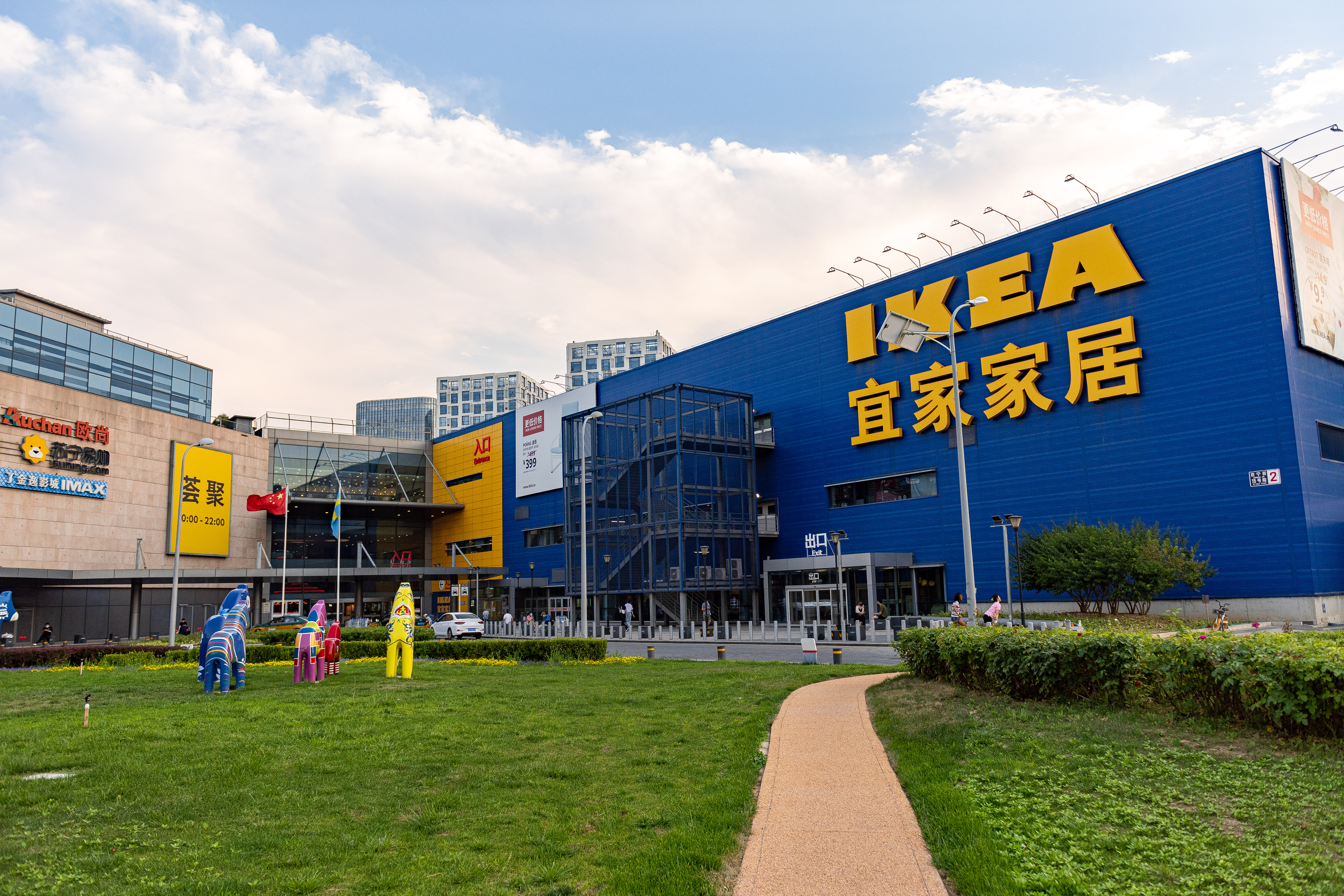
IKEA Beijing Xihongmen Store, 2021

== See also ==
- List of township-level divisions of Beijing
