= Guanyinsi Subdistrict =

Guanyinsi Subdistrict 观音寺街道
- Subdistrict
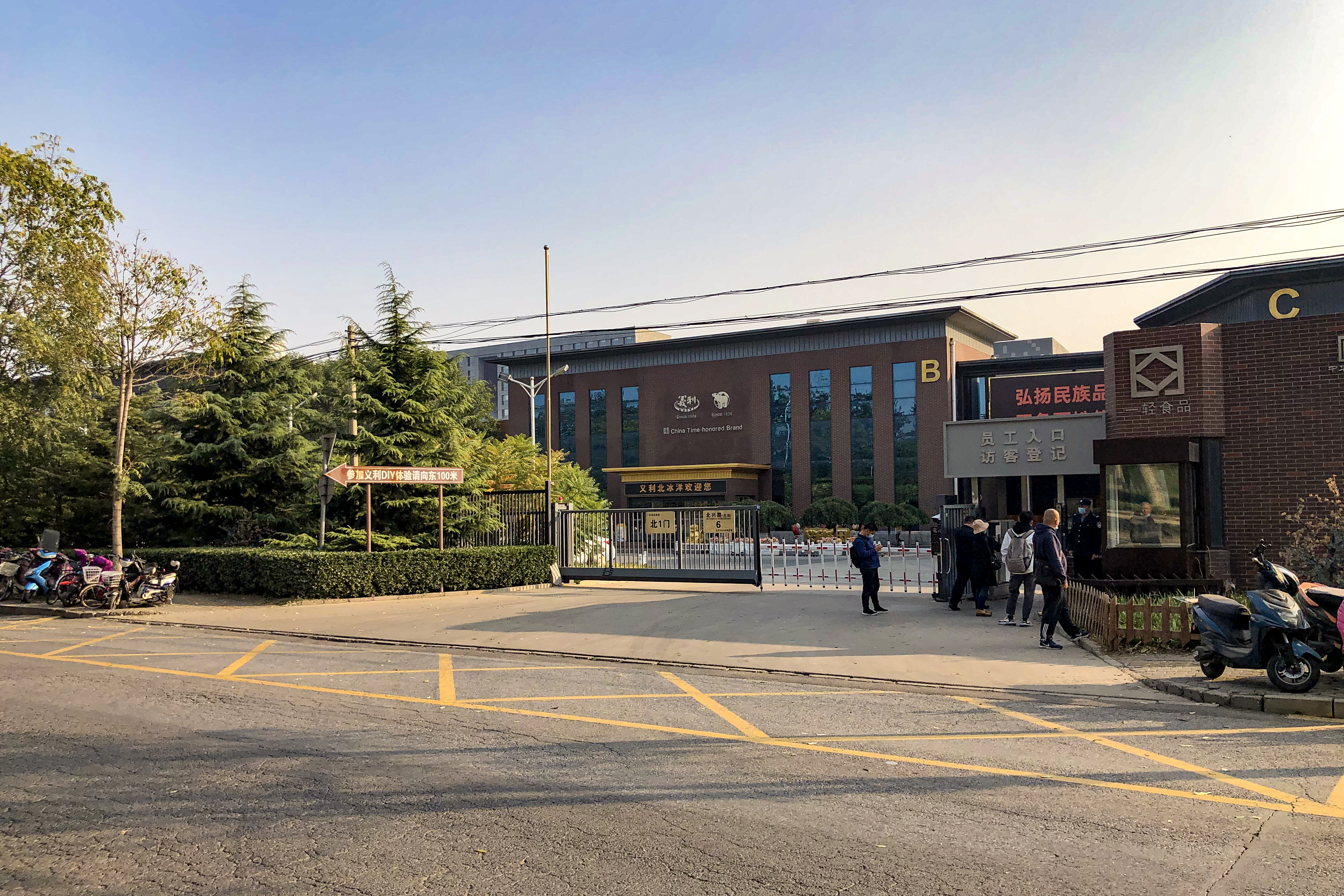
- Headquarters of Yili Bread and Arctic Ocean Company, 2020

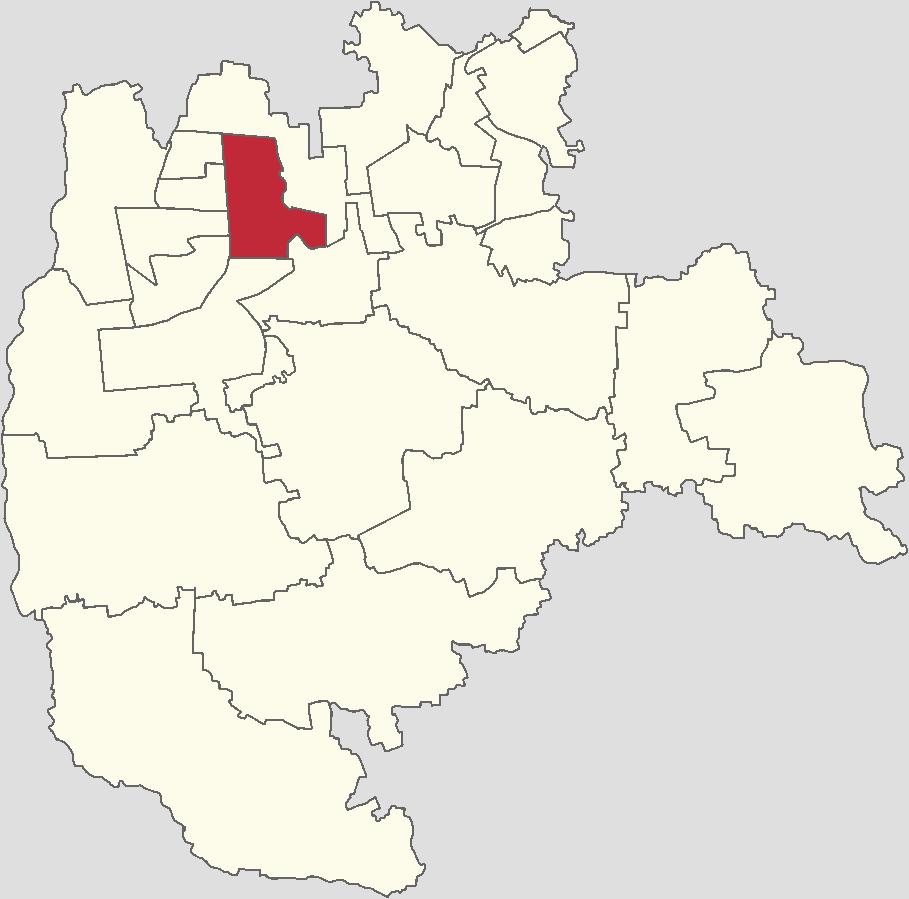
- Location within Daxing District

- Location within Beijing Location within China
- Coordinates: 39°44′32″N 116°20′46″E
- Country: China
- Municipality: Beijing
- District: Daxing
- Village-level Divisions: 21 communities

Area
  - Total: 14.32 km^{2} (5.53 sq mi)
- Elevation: 43 m (141 ft)

Population (2020)
  - Total: 111,225
  - Density: 7,767/km^{2} (20,120/sq mi)
- Time zone: UTC+8 (China Standard)
- Postal code: 102617
- Area code: 010

Guanyinsi Subdistrict (simplified Chinese: 观音寺街道; traditional Chinese: 觀音寺街道; pinyin: Guānyīnsì Jiēdào) is a subdistrict in the northern portion of Daxing District, Beijing, China. It is located at the south and west of Xihongmen Town, north of Tiangongyuan Subdistrict and Huangcun Town, northeast of Xingfeng and Linxiaolu Subdistricts, and east of Qingyuan and Gaomidian Subdistricts. In the year 2020, it had a total population of 111,225.

The name of this subdistrict is referring to a temple dedicated to Guanyin within its borders.

== History ==
Timeline of Guanyinsi Subdistrict
Year	Status	Within
1912 - 1928		Daxing County, Capital Area
1928 - 1937		3rd Prefecture, Hebei
1937 - 1949		5th Prefecture, Hebei
1949 - 1958		Tong County, Hebei
1958 - 1981		Daxing County, Beijing
1981 - 2001	Part of Huangcun Town	Daxing County, Beijing
2001 - 2009	Part of Qingyuan Subdistrict and Xingfeng Subdistrict	Daxing District
2009–present	Guanyinsi Subdistrict	Daxing District

== Administrative divisions ==
In 2021, Guanyinsi Subdistrict comprised 21 communities:

Administrative division code	Subdivision names	Name transliteration
110115009001	双河北里	Shuanghe Beili
110115009002	新安里	Xin'anli
110115009003	团河	Tuanhe
110115009004	南湖园	Nanhuyuan
110115009005	观音寺南里	Guanyinsi Nanli
110115009006	观音寺	Guanyinsi
110115009007	双河南里	Shuanghe Nanli
110115009008	新居里	Xinjuli
110115009009	盛春坊	Shengchunfang
110115009010	金华里	Jinhuali
110115009011	开发区	Kaifaqu
110115009012	泰中花园	Taizhong Huayuan
110115009013	观音寺北里	Guanyinsi Beili
110115009014	首座御园一里	Shouzuo Yuyuan Yili
110115009015	盛嘉华苑	Shengjia Huayuan
110115009016	首座御园二里	Shouzuo Yuyuan Erli
110115009017	首座御园三里	Shouzuo Yuyuan Sanli
110115009018	首座御园四里	Shouzuo Yuyuan Sili
110115009019	双河北里尚城	Shuanghe Beili Shangcheng
110115009020	美澜湾西区	Meilanwan Xiqu
110115009021	美澜湾东区	Meilanwan Dongqu

== See also ==
- List of township-level divisions of Beijing
