= Miaofengshan =

Miaofengshan Town 妙峰山镇
- Town
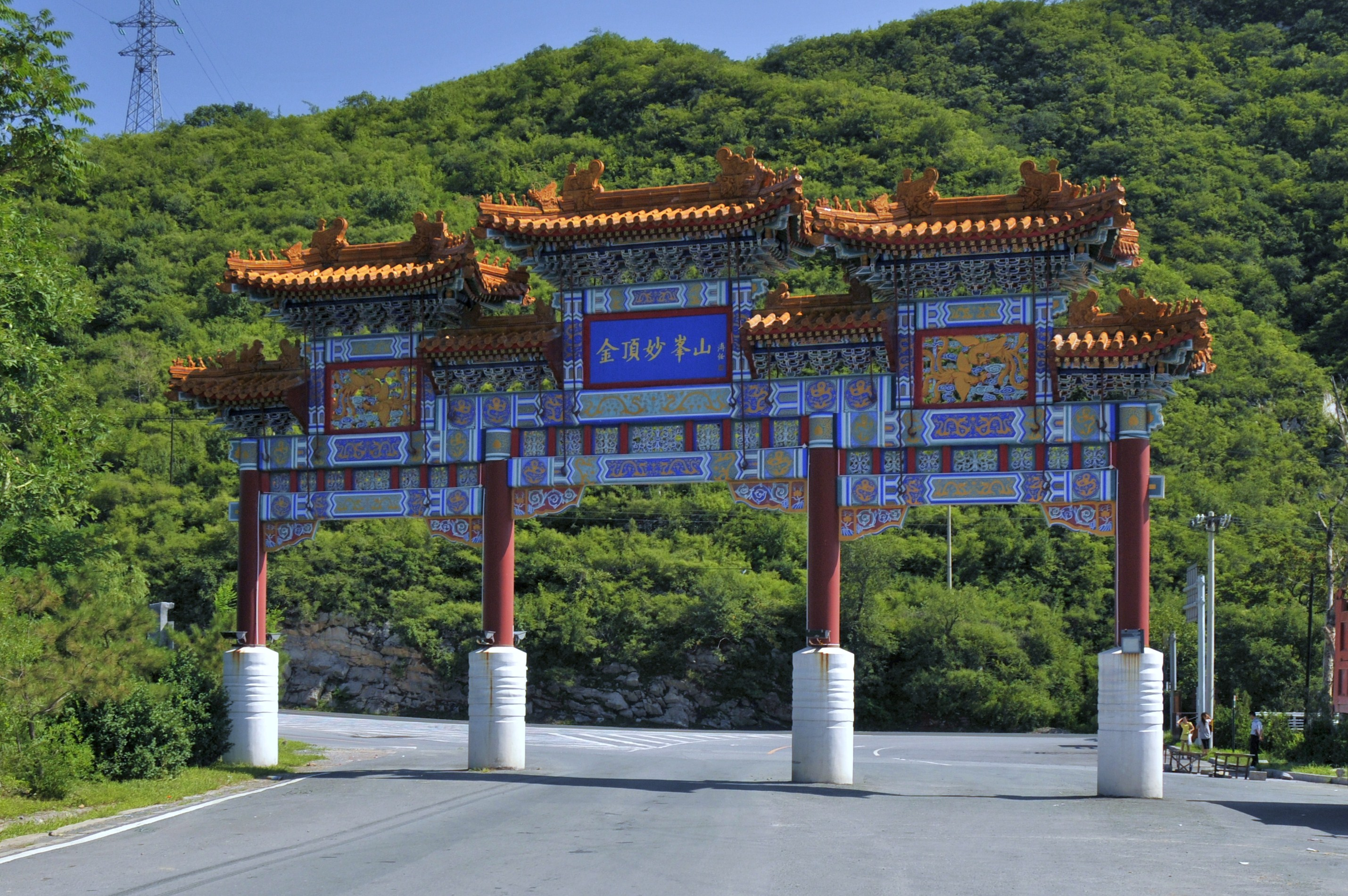
- Entrance gate of Miaofeng Mountain Trail, 2010

- Location within Beijing Location within China
- Coordinates: 39°58′28″N 116°02′39″E
- Country: China
- Municipality: Beijing
- District: Mentougou
- Village-level Divisions: 17 villages

Area
  - Total: 111.6 km^{2} (43.1 sq mi)

Population (2020)
  - Total: 10,012
  - Density: 89.71/km^{2} (232.4/sq mi)
- Time zone: UTC+8 (China Standard)
- Postal code: 102399
- Area code: 010

Miaofengshan (Chinese: 妙峰山; pinyin: Miàofēngshān), named after the mountain with the same name, is a town in Mentougou District, in the eastern edge of the Western Hills of Beijing. It borders Liucun Town to its north, Sujiatuo, Longquan and Junzhuang Towns to its east, Datai Subdistrict and Wangping Town to its south, and Yanchi Town to its west. In 2020, the census counted a total of 10,012 residents living within the town.

== History ==
Timeline of Miaofengshan Town
Time	Status
Ming and Qing dynasties	Part of Wanping County
1949	Part of the 5th District of Wanping County
1950	Part of the 3rd District of Wanping
1952	Transferred to Datai Microdistrict, Jingxi Mining District
1958	Part of Datai People's Commune
1982	Changed to Miaofengshan Township
2000	Merged with Shangweidian Township to create Miaofengshan Town

== Administrative divisions ==
At the end of 2021, Miaofengshan Town comprised 17 villages, all of which are listed below:

Administrative division code	Subdivision names	Name transliterations
110109108201	陇驾庄	Longjiazhuang
110109108202	丁家滩	Dingjiatan
110109108203	水峪嘴	Shuiyuzui
110109108204	斜河涧	Xiehejian
110109108205	陈家庄	Chenjiazhuang
110109108206	担礼	Danli
110109108207	下苇甸	Xiaweidian
110109108208	桃园	Taoyuan
110109108209	南庄	Nanzhuang
110109108210	樱桃沟	Yingtaogou
110109108211	涧沟	Jiangou
110109108212	上苇甸	Shangweidian
110109108213	炭厂	Tanchang
110109108214	大沟	Dagou
110109108215	禅房	Shanfang
110109108216	黄台	Huangtai
110109108217	岭角	Lingjiao

== See also ==
- List of township-level divisions of Beijing
