= Wangping =

Wangping may refer to:

- Wangping Township (王坪乡), a township in Ruyang County, Henan, China
- Wangping, Beijing (王平), a town-level division in Mentougou District, Beijing, China

== See also ==
- Wang Ping (disambiguation) — for a list of people
- Wanping (disambiguation)
