= Tanzhesi =

Tanzhesi Town 潭柘寺镇
- Town
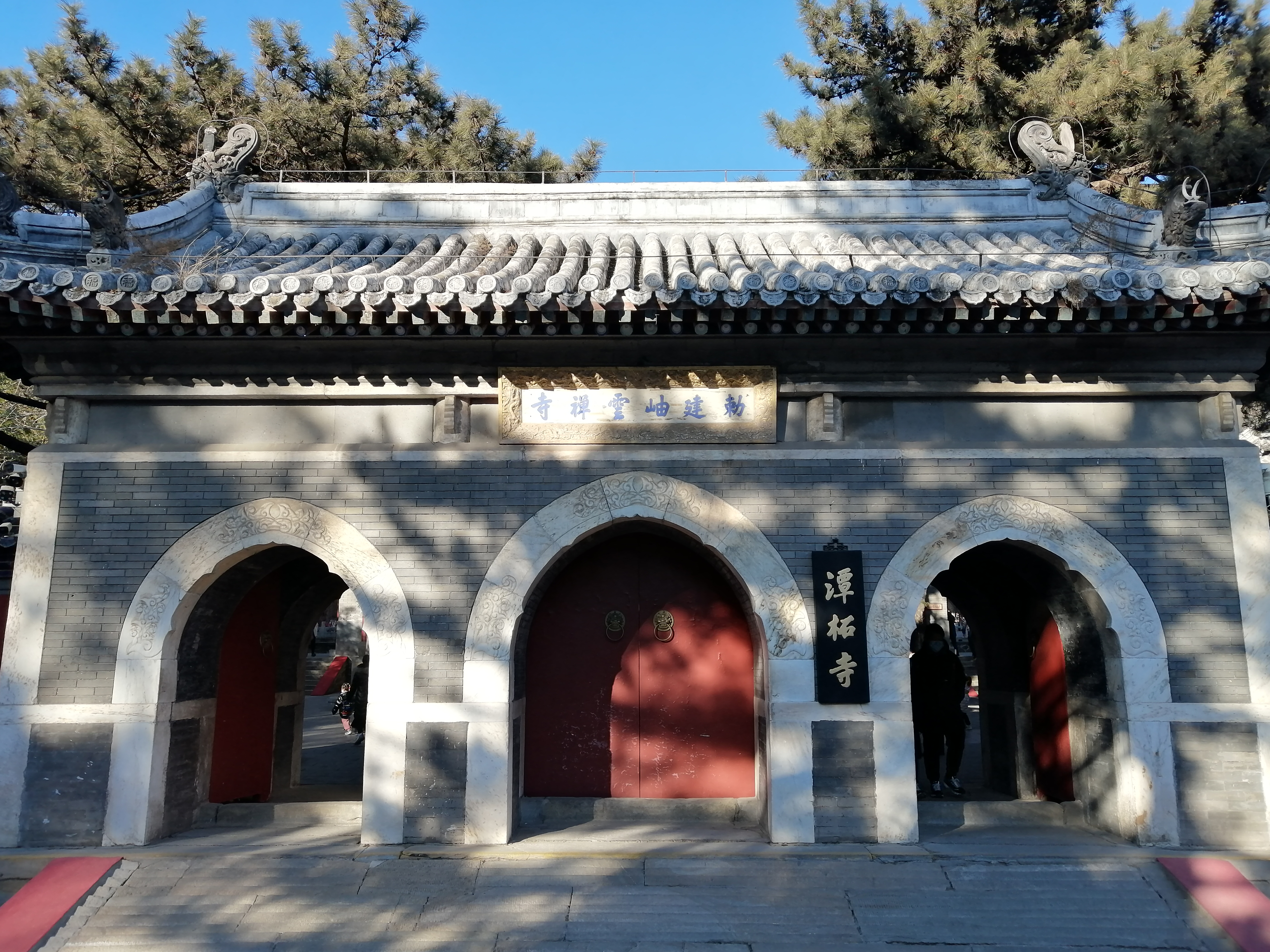
- Tanzhe Temple within the town, 2007

- Location within Beijing Location within China
- Coordinates: 39°52′39″N 116°01′26″E
- Country: China
- Municipality: Beijing
- District: Mentougou
- Village-level Divisions: 3 communities 12 villages

Area
  - Total: 79.86 km^{2} (30.83 sq mi)

Population (2020)
  - Total: 11,053
  - Density: 138.4/km^{2} (358.5/sq mi)
- Time zone: UTC+8 (China Standard)
- Postal code: 102308
- Area code: 010

Tanzhesi Town (Chinese: 潭柘寺镇; pinyin: Tánzhèsì Zhèn) is a town located in southeastern Mentougou District, Beijing, China. It borders Dongxinfang Subdistrict, Yongding and Longquan Towns in the north, Yongding and Wangzuo Towns in the east, Qinglonghu and Hebei Towns in the south, and Fozizhuang Township in the west. Its population was 11,053 in 2020.

The name Tanzhesi refers to Tanzhe Temple that is located inside the town.

== History ==
Timeline of Tanzhesi Town's History
Year	Status
1949	Established as Tanzhesi Township
1958	Part of Mentougou People's Commune
1962	Formed its own commune
1984	Restored as a township
1994	Reorganized into a town

== Administrative Divisions ==
As of 2021, Tanzhesi Town was divided into 15 subdivisions, including 3 communities and 12 villages. They are listed in the table below:

Administrative division code	Subdivision names	Name transliteration	Type
110109101001	潭柘新二区	Tanzhe Xin'erqu	Community
110109101002	潭柘新一区	Tanzhe Xinyiqu	Community
110109101003	檀香嘉园	Tanxiang Jiayuan	Community
110109101201	北村	Beicun	Village
110109101202	东村	Dongcun	Village
110109101203	南村	Nancun	Village
110109101204	鲁家滩	Lujiatan	Village
110109101205	南辛房	Nanxinfang	Village
110109101206	桑峪	Sangyu	Village
110109101207	平原	Pingyuan	Village
110109101208	王坡	Wangpo	Village
110109101209	贾沟	Jiagou	Village
110109101210	草甸水	Caodianshui	Village
110109101211	赵家台	Zhaojiatai	Village
110109101212	阳坡元	Yangpoyuan	Village

== See also ==
- List of township-level divisions of Beijing
