= Yanchi, Beijing =

Yanchi Town 雁翅镇
- Town
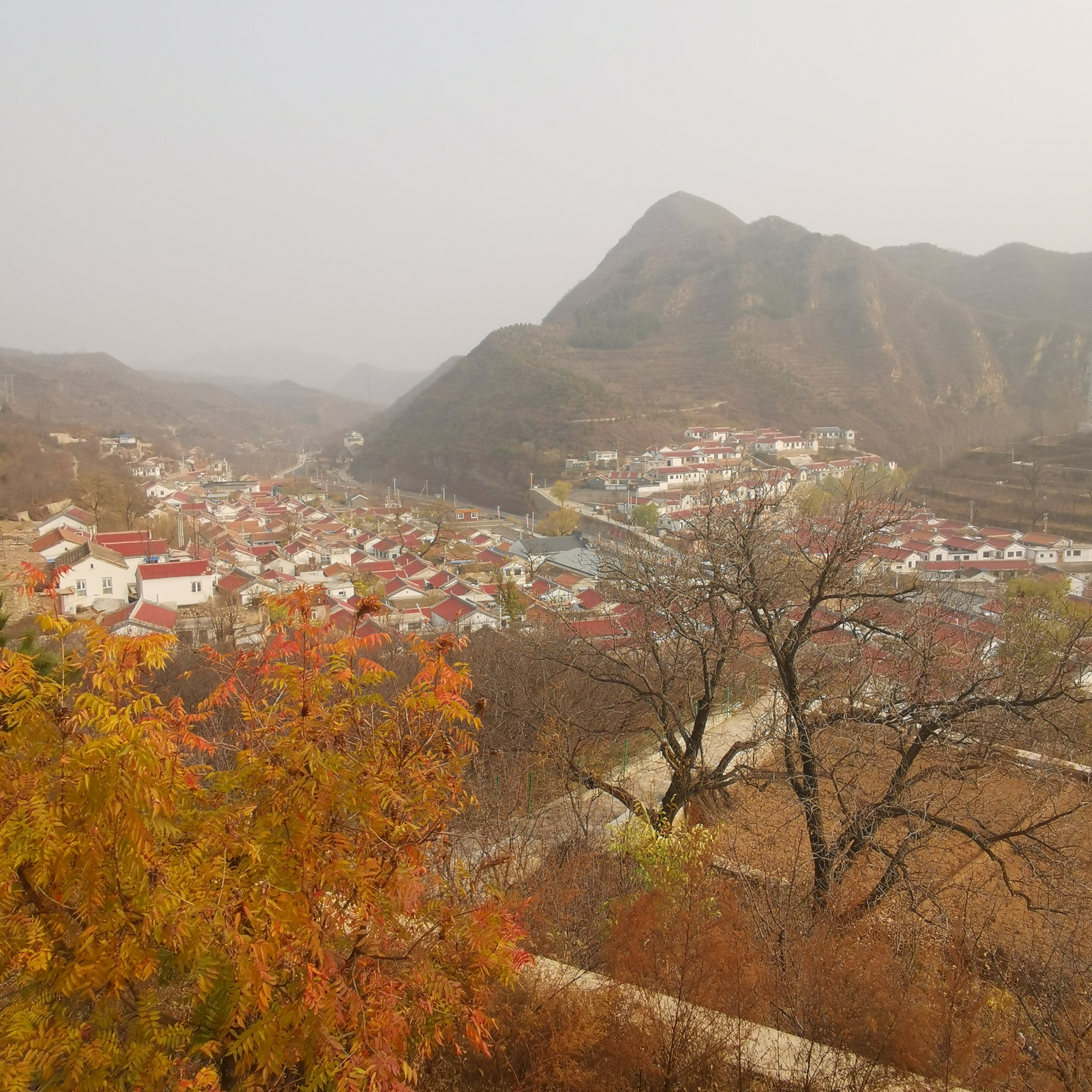
- Tianzhuang Village within the Town, 2019

- Location within Beijing Location within China
- Coordinates: 40°01′17″N 115°50′02″E
- Country: China
- Municipality: Beijing
- District: Mentougou
- Village-level Divisions: 1 communities 23 villages

Area
  - Total: 263.4 km^{2} (101.7 sq mi)

Population (2020)
  - Total: 5,160
  - Density: 19.6/km^{2} (50.7/sq mi)
- Time zone: UTC+8 (China Standard)
- Postal code: 102305
- Area code: 010

Yanchi Town (Chinese: 雁翅镇; pinyin: Yànchì Zhèn) is a town located at the northern part of Mentougou District, Beijing, China. It borders Liucun Town and Huailai County to its north, Miaofengshan and Wangping Towns to its east, Datai Subdistrict to its south, and Zhaitang Town to its west. It was home to 5,160 people in 2020.

The name Yanchi (Chinese: 雁翅; lit. 'Wild Goose's Wings') originated in the Yuan dynasty, and was named after a local mountain which shaped like wild goose's wings.

== History ==
Timetable of changes in the status of Yanchi Town
Time	Status
Ming and Qing dynasty	Yanchi village
1958	Qingbaikou People's Commune was established
1984	Changed to Qingbaikou Township
1994	Combined with Tianzhuang Township to create Yanchi Town

== Administrative Divisions ==
As of 2021, Yanchi Town consisted of 24 subdivisions, where 1 was a residential community and the rest were villages:

Administrative division code	Subdivision names	Name transliteration	Type
110109105001	雁翅	Yanchi	Community
110109105201	河南台	Henantai	Village
110109105202	雁翅	Yanchi	Village
110109105203	芹峪	Qinyu	Village
110109105204	下马岭	Xiamaling	Village
110109105205	饮马鞍	Yingma'an	Village
110109105206	太子墓	Taizimu	Village
110109105207	付家台	Fujiatai	Village
110109105208	青白口	Qingbaikou	Village
110109105209	珠窝	Zhuwo	Village
110109105210	碣石	Jieshi	Village
110109105211	黄土贵	Huangtugui	Village
110109105212	泗家水	Sijiashui	Village
110109105213	淤白	Yubai	Village
110109105214	高台	Gaotai	Village
110109105215	松树	Songshu	Village
110109105216	田庄	Tianzhuag	Village
110109105217	苇子水	Weizishui	Village
110109105218	大村	Dacun	Village
110109105219	房良	Fangliang	Village
110109105220	杨村	Yangcun	Village
110109105221	马套	Matao	Village
110109105222	山神庙	Shanshenmiao	Village
110109105223	跃进	Yuejin	Village

== See also ==
- List of township-level divisions of Beijing
