= Ping Wang =

Ping Wang may refer to:

- Pingwang (disambiguation), a list of places
- Wang Ping (disambiguation), a list of people with the surname Wang
- King Ping (disambiguation), also known as Ping Wang

== See also ==
- Bing Wang (disambiguation), the pinyin equivalent of "Ping Wang" in Wade–Giles
