= Qingshui, Beijing =

Qingshui Town 清水镇
- Town
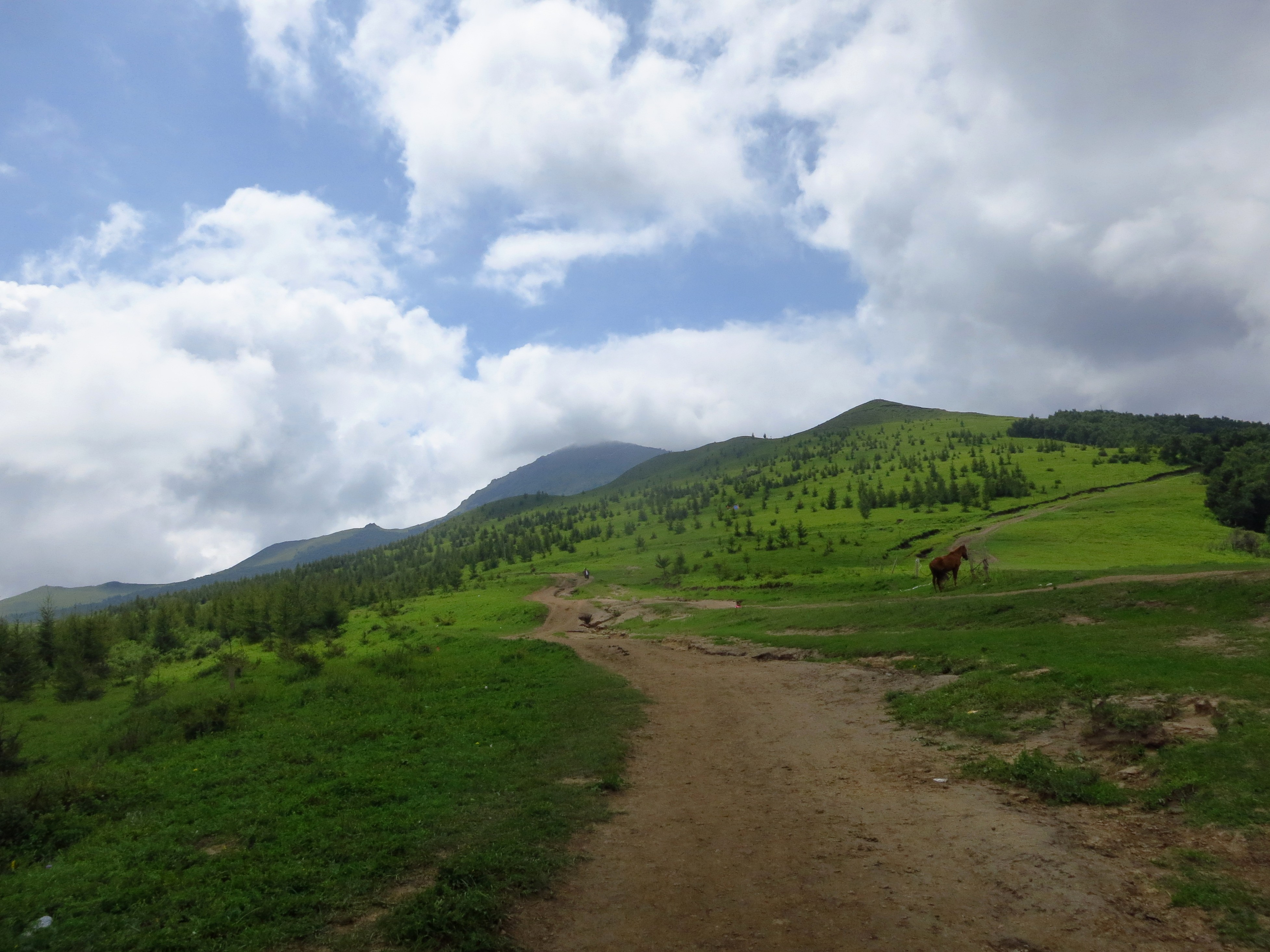
- Dongling Mountain on the border with Hebei, 2016

- Location within Beijing Location within China
- Coordinates: 39°56′34″N 115°37′11″E
- Country: China
- Municipality: Beijing
- District: Mentougou
- Village-level Divisions: 32 villages

Area
  - Total: 335.6 km^{2} (129.6 sq mi)

Population (2020)
  - Total: 6,025
  - Density: 17.95/km^{2} (46.50/sq mi)
- Time zone: UTC+8 (China Standard)
- Postal code: 102311
- Area code: 010

Qingshui Town (Chinese: 清水镇; pinyin: Qīngshuǐ Zhèn) is a town located on the western end of Mentougou District, Beijing, China. It shares border with Zhuolu and Huailai Counties in the north, Zhaitang Town in the east, Shijiaying and Xiayunling Townships in the south, and Laishui County in the west. The population of Qingshui was 6,025 as of 2020.

The town takes its name Qingshui (Chinese: 清水; lit. 'Clean Water') from the Qingshui River, which is originated from this town.

== History ==
History of Qingshui Town
Year	Status
1949	Part of JIngxi Mining District
1956	13 local townships merged into Qingshui, Huangta, Yanjiatai and Jijiazhuang Townships
1960	The 4 townships merged to form Zhaitang Township
1963	Zhaitang was divided into 3 People's Commune: Qingshui, Huangta and Jijiazhuang
1984	The 3 communes reformed into townships
1994	The 3 township were combined to form Qingshui Town

== Administrative Divisions ==
As of 2021, Qingshui Town was made up of 32 villages:

Administrative division code	Subdivision names	Name transliteration
110109107201	燕家台	Yanjiatai
110109107202	李家庄	Lijiazhuang
110109107203	梁家庄	Liangjiazhuang
110109107204	台上	Taishang
110109107205	上清水	Shang Qingshui
110109107206	下清水	Xia Qingshui
110109107207	田寺	Tiansi
110109107208	西达么	Si Dame
110109107209	洪水峪	Hongshuiyu
110109107210	上达么	Shang Dame
110109107211	达么庄	Damezhuang
110109107212	椴木沟	Duanmugou
110109107213	梁家铺	Liangjiapu
110109107214	塔河	Tahe
110109107215	黄安	Huang'an
110109107216	龙王	Longwang
110109107217	黄安坨	Huang'antuo
110109107218	黄塔	Huangta
110109107219	八亩堰	Bamuyan
110109107220	简昌	Jianchang
110109107221	艾峪	Aiyu
110109107222	双涧子	Shuangjianzi
110109107223	张家铺	Zhangjiapu
110109107224	杜家庄	Dujiazhuang
110109107225	张家庄	Zhangjiazhuang
110109107226	齐家庄	Jijiazhuang
110109107227	双塘涧	Shuangtangjian
110109107228	天河水	Tianheshui
110109107229	胜利	Shengli
110109107230	小龙门	Xiaolongmen
110109107231	洪水口	Hongshuikou
110109107232	江水河	Jiangshuihe

== See also ==
- List of township-level divisions of Beijing
