= Pingwang =

Pingwang may refer to the following places in China:

- Pingwang, Jiangsu (平望), a town in Suzhou, Jiangsu
- Pingwang Township, Hebei (平王乡), a township in Rongcheng County, Hebei
- Pingwang Township, Shanxi (平旺乡), a township in Datong, Shanxi

== See also ==
- King Ping (disambiguation), also known as Pingwang
- Ping Wang (disambiguation)
