= Qinglonghu =

Qinglonghu Town 青龙湖镇
- Town
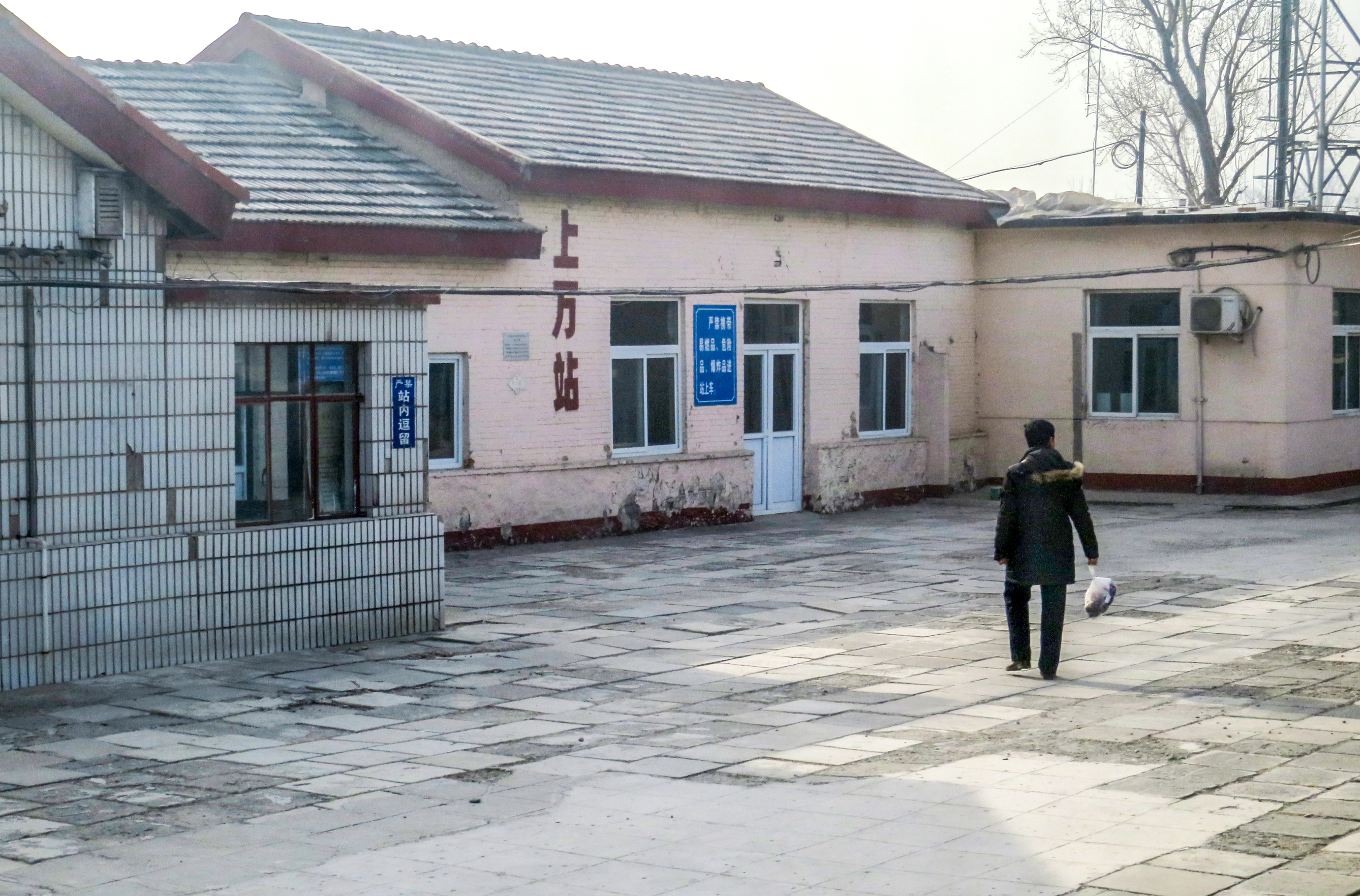
- Shangwan railway station of Beijing–Yuanping railway within the town, 2015

- Location within Beijing Location within China
- Coordinates: 39°46′30″N 116°02′00″E
- Country: China
- Municipality: Beijing
- District: Fangshan
- Village-level Divisions: 3 communities 32 villages

Area
  - Total: 96.17 km^{2} (37.13 sq mi)

Population (2020)
  - Total: 52,319
  - Density: 544.0/km^{2} (1,409/sq mi)
- Time zone: UTC+8 (China Standard)
- Postal code: 102447
- Area code: 010

Qinglonghu Town (Chinese: 青龙湖镇; pinyin: Qīnglónghú Zhèn) is a town located in northeastern Fangshan District, Beijing, China. It shares border with Tanzhesi Town in the north, Wangzuo Town and Xilu Subdistrict in the east, Yancun Town, Xinzhen and Chengguan Subdistricts in the south, Dongfeng Subdistrict and Hebei Town in the west. Its population was 52,319 as of 2020.

The town was named after Qinglong Lake (Chinese: 青龙湖; pinyin: Qīnglóng Hú; lit. 'Azure Dragon Lake') that is located within it.

== History ==
Timetable of Qinglonghu Town
Year	Status	Part of
1916 - 1949	4th District (四区)	Fangshan County (房山县)
1949 - 1950	8th District (八区)	Fangshan County (房山县)
1950 - 1954	5th District (五区)	Fangshan County (房山县)
1954 - 1958	Chonggezhuang Township (崇各庄乡)	Liangxiang County (良乡县)
1954 - 1958	Dayuan Township (大苑乡)	Fangshan County
1954 - 1958	Tuoli Township (坨里乡)	Jingxi Mining Area (京西矿区)
1958 - 1961	Chonggezhuang Township Dougezhuang Township (豆各庄乡) Changlesi Township(常乐寺乡)	Liangxiang County
1958 - 1961	Dayuan Township	Fangshan County
1958 - 1961	Tuoli Township	Jingxi Mining Area
1961 - 1983	Chonggezhuang People's Commune (崇各庄人民公社) Tuoli People's Commune (坨里人民公社)	Fangshan County
1983 - 1986	Chonggezhuang Township Tuoli Township	Fangshan County
1986 - 1995	Chonggezhuang Township Tuoli Township	Fangshan District
1995 - 2000	Chonggezhuang Township Tuoli Town (坨里镇)	Fangshan District
2000 - 2001	Qinglonghu Town Tuoli Town	Fangshan District
2001–present	Qinglonghu Town	Fangshan District

== Administrative Divisions ==
At the end of 2021, Qinglonghu Town had 35 subdivisions, consisted of 3 communities and 32 villages:

Administrative division code	Subdivision names	Name transliteration	Type
110111112001	京煤集团化工厂	Jingmei Jituan Huagongchang	Community
110111112002	北京昊煜京强水泥厂	Beijing Haoyu Jingqiang Shuinichang	Community
110111112003	宜青街	Yiqing Jie	Community
110111112200	晓幼营	Xiaoyouying	Village
110111112201	西石府	Xishifu	Village
110111112202	常乐寺	Changlesi	Village
110111112203	北四位	Bei Siwei	Village
110111112204	南四位	Nan Siwei	Village
110111112205	焦各庄	Jiaogezhuang	Village
110111112206	小苑上	Xiaoyuanshang	Village
110111112207	青龙头	Qinglongtou	Village
110111112208	崇各庄	Chonggezhuang	Village
110111112209	豆各庄	Dougezhuang	Village
110111112210	庙耳岗	Miao'ergang	Village
110111112211	辛庄	Xinzhuang	Village
110111112212	芦上坟	Lushangfen	Village
110111112213	大苑	Dayuan	Village
110111112214	北刘庄	Beiliuzhuang	Village
110111112215	大马	Dama	Village
110111112216	小马	Xiaoma	Village
110111112217	果各庄	Guogezhuang	Village
110111112218	西庄户	Xizhuanghu	Village
110111112219	岗上	Gangshang	Village
110111112220	坨里	Tuoli	Village
110111112221	上万	Shangwan	Village
110111112222	北车营	Beicheying	Village
110111112223	辛开口	Xinkaikou	Village
110111112224	漫水河	Manshuihe	Village
110111112225	南观	Nanguan	Village
110111112226	口头	Koutou	Village
110111112227	沙窝	Shawo	Village
110111112228	大苑上	Dayuanshang	Village
110111112229	马家沟	Majiagou	Village
110111112230	水峪	Shuiyu	Village
110111112231	石梯	Shiti	Village

== Gallery ==
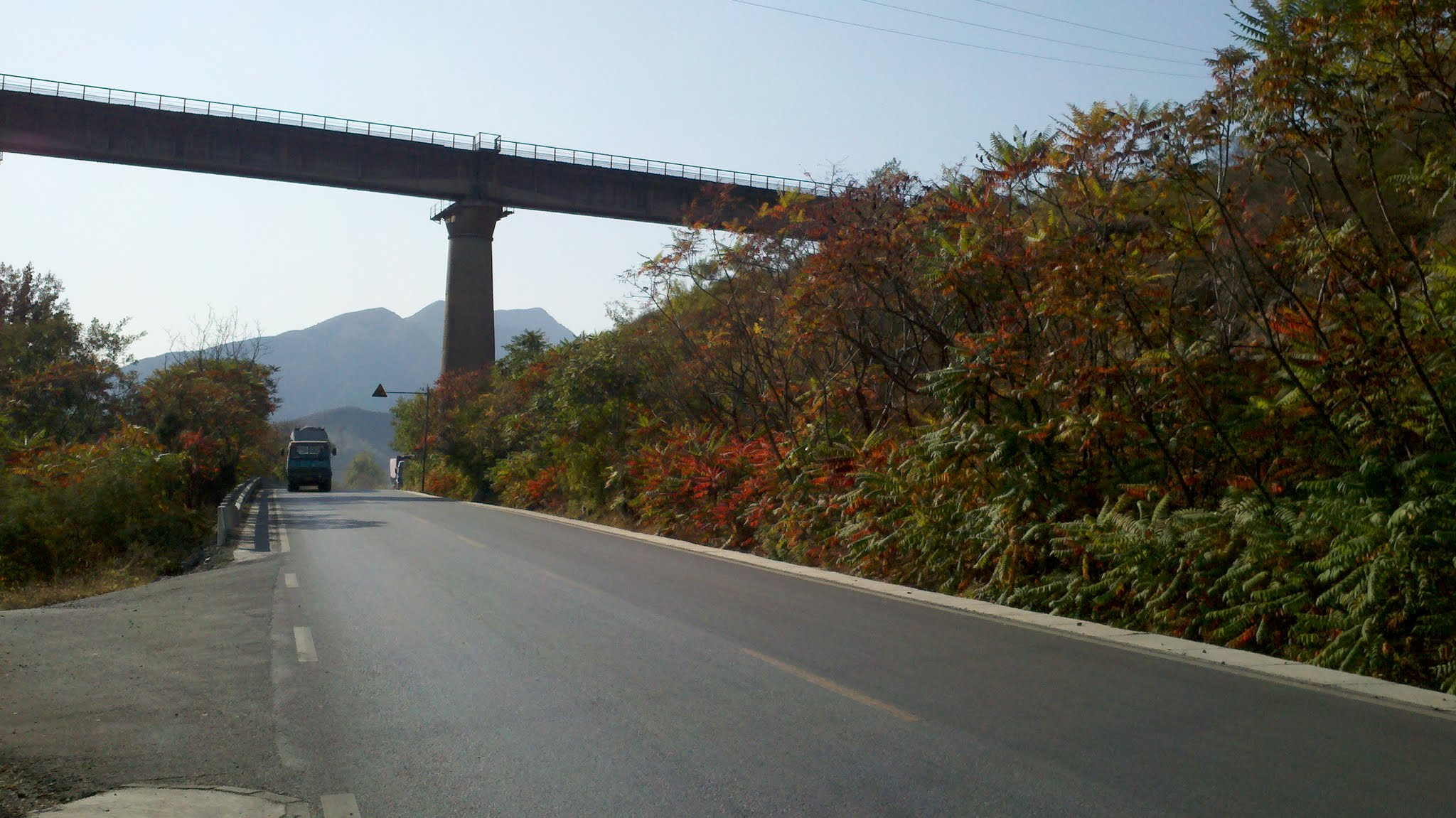
Yanhe Highway around Manshuihe Village, west of the town

== See also ==
- List of township-level divisions of Beijing
