= Tanzhe Temple =

Buddhist temple in Beijing, China

- 潭柘寺
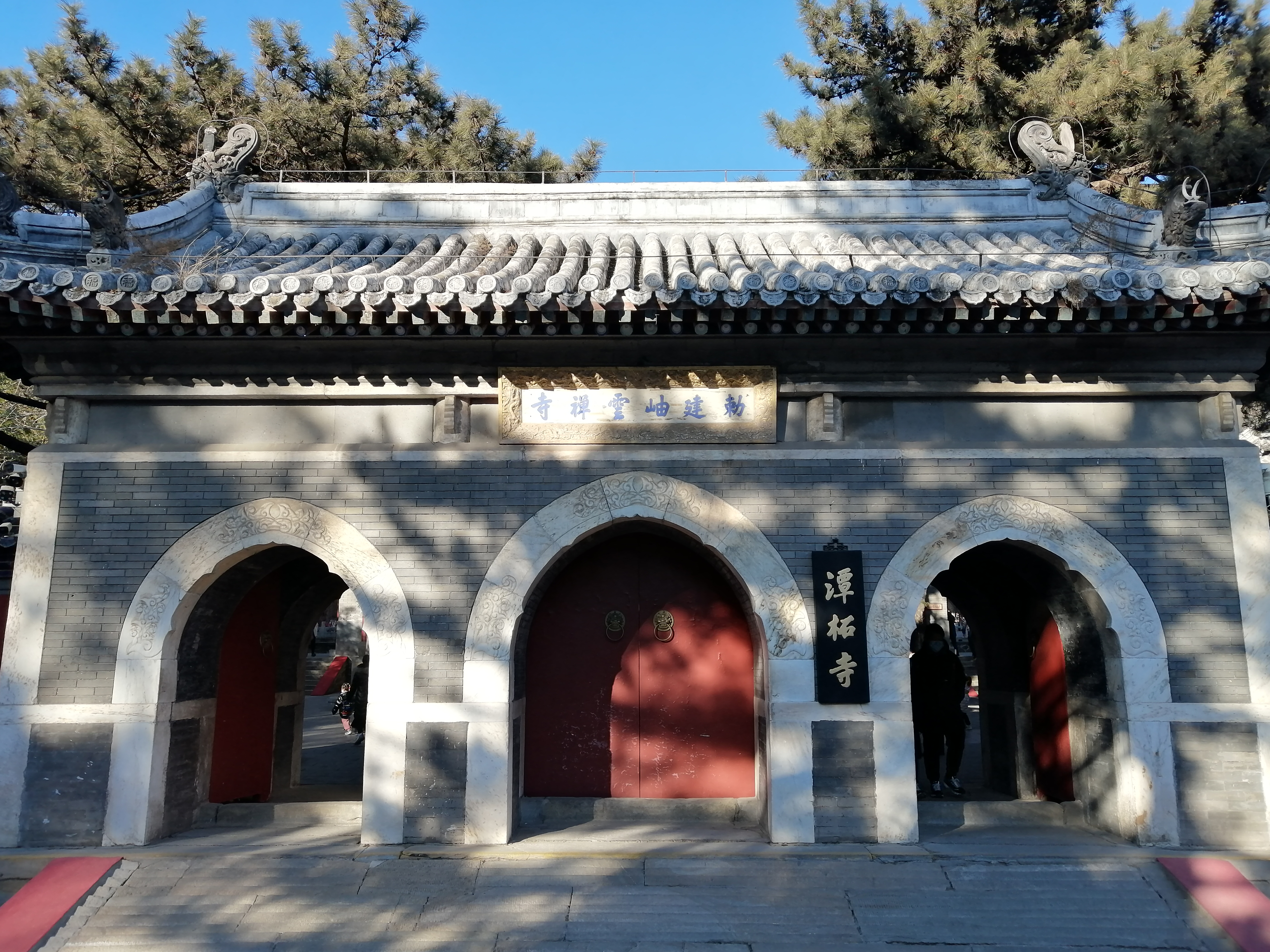
- An entrance into the Tanzhe Temple

- Location on Beijing.

Religion
- Affiliation: Buddhism

Location
- Location: Tanzhesi Town, Mentougou District, Beijing
- Country: China
- Coordinates: 39°54′14″N 116°01′27″E

Architecture
- Style: Chinese architecture
- Established: 307

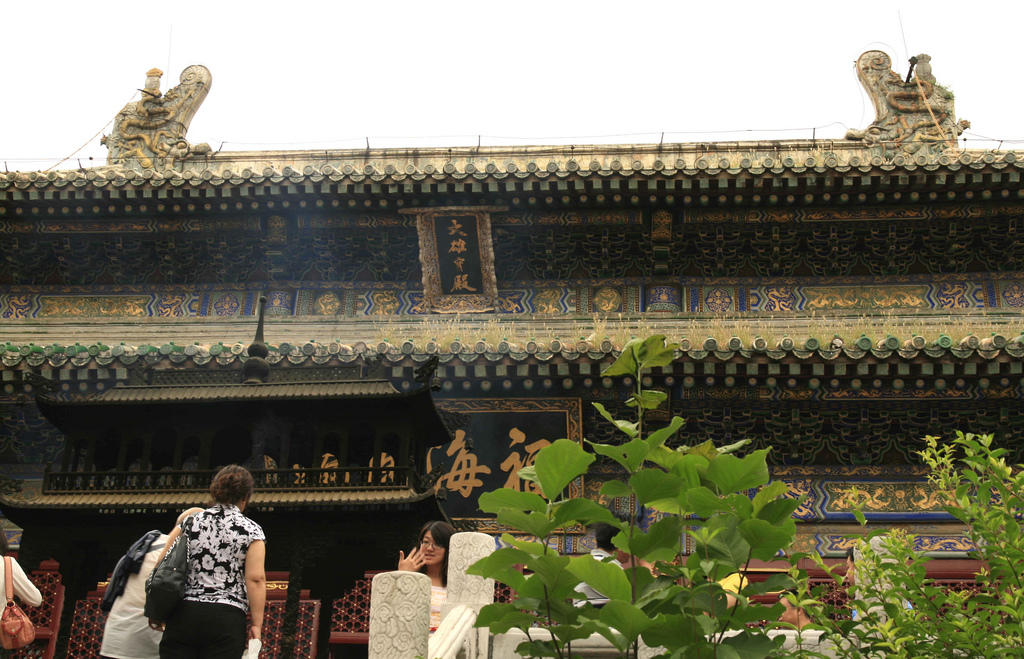
One of the main halls inside the temple

The Tanzhe Temple (Chinese: 潭柘寺; pinyin: Tán Zhè Sì; lit. 'Temple of Pool and Zhe Tree') is a Buddhist temple situated in the Western Hills, a mountainous area in western Beijing. The temple is located near China National Highway 108 in Tanzhesi Town, Mentougou District, Beijing. At one time, it was one of the most important temples in China.

Built in the Jin dynasty (266–420), it has an age of around 1,700 years. Tanzhe Temple is one of the oldest temples in Beijing. The area of the entire temple is 100 mu (6.8 hectares), and its arrangement of halls is akin to that found in the Ming and Qing dynasties.

== History ==
Tanzhe Temple was first established in the 1st year of Yongjia period (307) in Western Jin dynasty (265-317) with the name of Jiafu Temple (嘉福寺) and was later renamed Xiuyun Temple (岫云寺) by Kangxi Emperor (1662-1772) in the Qing dynasty (1644-1911). But since there was a dragon pool behind the temple and mulberry trees in the mountain, so people always call it "Tanzhe Temple". For the reason that it was first built earlier than Beijing city, so there is a saying that "there comes first the Tanzhe Temple, then the Beijing city" (先有潭柘寺，后有北京城).

Tanzhe Temple entered the most glorious period in the Qing dynasty (1644-1911), four emperors, namely Kangxi Emperor (1662-1722), Yongzheng Emperor (1723-1735), Qianlong Emperor (1736-1795) and Jiaqing Emperor (1796-1820) all came to Tanzhe Temple to worship Buddha, which elevated its position and attracted more people to the temple.

== Architecture ==
Most of the existing buildings in the temple are from the Ming and Qing dynasties, and there are pagodas from various historical periods such as the Jin, Yuan, Ming and Qing dynasties. The over 900 rooms and 638 halls still maintain in the style of the Ming dynasty (1368–1644) and Qing dynasty (1644–1911). The two "Emperor trees" by the Hall of Three Sages were planted during the Liao dynasty (907–1125) about 1,000 years ago.

The spacious and imposing buildings are arranged in three main northsouth axes. Along the central axis are the Archway, the shanmen, Deveraja Hall, Mahavira Hall and Vairochana Pavilion.

The temple's central hall is its Mahavira Hall, 24 m (79 ft) in length, and 33 m (108 ft) wide. Buddhist monks regularly perform religious ceremony here.

The temple is divided between the Hall of Abstinence, the Ordination Altar and the Hall of Guanyin. The latter has received fame because of its association with Princess Miaoyan, daughter of Kublai Khan. The princess is said to have entered nunnery here in the 13th century. The indentations can be found on the stone on which she always knelt and prayed within the hall. Supposedly she was also buried within the temple compound.

To the right of the main courtyard lies a separate yard containing stone monuments built in different styles over a period of several centuries and housing the remains of eminent monks.

=== Mahavira Hall ===
The Mahavira Hall has double-eave hip roofs (重檐庑殿顶) covered with yellow glazed titles, which symbolize a high level in Chinese architecture. Under the eaves is a plaque with the words "Fuhai Zhulun" (福海珠轮; Fuhai means the western paradise and Zhulun means a big ship.) written by Qianlong Emperor (1736-1795) in the Qing dynasty (1644-1911). On each end of the main ridge is a giant glazed Chiwen with colorful glaze and vivid style. It was made in the Yuan dynasty (1279-1368). Chiwen is a legendary animal with a dragon head and fish tail. In the ancient time, people placed Chiwen at both ends of houses' main ridges to prevent water leakage, avoid fire and protect their family. It was said that when Kangxi Emperor (1662-1722) once came to Tanzhe Temple, he saw the Chiwen was going to leave, he ordered to build a long gilded chain and plug a sword to lock and prevent it from escaping.

=== Yigan Pavilion ===
The Yigan Pavilion (猗玕亭), also known as Liubei Pavilion (流杯亭' Pavilion of Bestowing Wine). Its ground, which is made of white marble, is inscribed with twists and turns of the sinks winding and constituting a pattern of a dragon and a tiger. Springs spout out from the mouth of stone dragon waterway in the northeast corner of the pavilion and flow in the winding sinks. Visitors can sit in the pavilion and emulate ancient people's custom of "Qushui Liushang" (a group people drink water from a winding canal with one wine cup floating on it) and enjoy the wine and poems composing.

=== Pagoda Forest ===
Tanzhe Temple has a large scale of tomb pagodas built near it. Now near 70 pagodas built in different dynasties are entirely preserved. They are of various types, such as stone column pagodas (石经幢式塔), monolayer square pagodas (方形单层浮屠式塔), dense-eave brick pagodas (密檐式砖塔) and overturned-bowl shaped pagodas with Tibetan style (覆钵形藏式石塔).
