= Mount Ling (Beijing) =

Mountain in China

- Mount Dongling

Highest point
- Elevation: 2,303 m (7,556 ft)
- Coordinates: 40°1′1.51″N 115°27′13.08″E

Naming
- Native name: Língshān (Chinese)

Geography
- Location: Mentougou District, Beijing, China
- Parent range: Western Hills

Mount Ling (Chinese: 灵山; pinyin: Língshān), also known as Mount Dongling (东灵山), Lingshan or Donglingshan, is a mountain in the Western Hills, an extension of the Taihang Mountains. It is located in Mentougou District, Beijing, about 120 kilometers to the west of downtown Beijing. The mountain is significant for its wildlife, especially birds. At an elevation of 2,303 metres, the summit is the highest point within the Municipality of Beijing.

== Wildlife ==
Mammals on Mount Ling include tolai hare, Siberian roe deer, Chinese goral, leopard cat, Siberian chipmunk, Pere David's rock squirrel and possibly raccoon dog.

Over 100 species of birds have been recorded on the mountain, including pheasants, hawks and eagles, doves, cuckoos and owls, woodpeckers, tits, larks, warblers, nuthatches, thrushes, redstart, flycatchers, redpolls, finches, and buntings. Rare species have included Przevalski's redstart, Güldenstädt's redstart, and Pallas's rosefinch.

== Access routes ==
It is possible to drive up 1,650 metres above sea level where there is a car park and chair lift (running from June to October) which ascends another 430 metres. From the top of the chair lift it takes about an hour to walk to the summit.

There are various paths leading to the summit on either side of the chairlift, which is on the east side of the mountain. The direct route along the ridge immediately south of the chairlift, starting at the Lingshan Hotel, takes about three hours to ascend. There is another less direct route on the north side of the chairlift.

The Lingshan Ancient Path (灵山古道) provides access from the south. Starting at a white marble arch (paifang) near Julingxia Village (聚灵峡), this route goes to the peak via the Lingshan Ancient Path Forest Park. Most of the path consists of a wooden walkway, with many steep steps. This route takes about five hours to the summit.
