= Cuandixia =

Coordinates: 39°59′49″N 115°38′18″E

Cuandixia 爨底下村
- Village
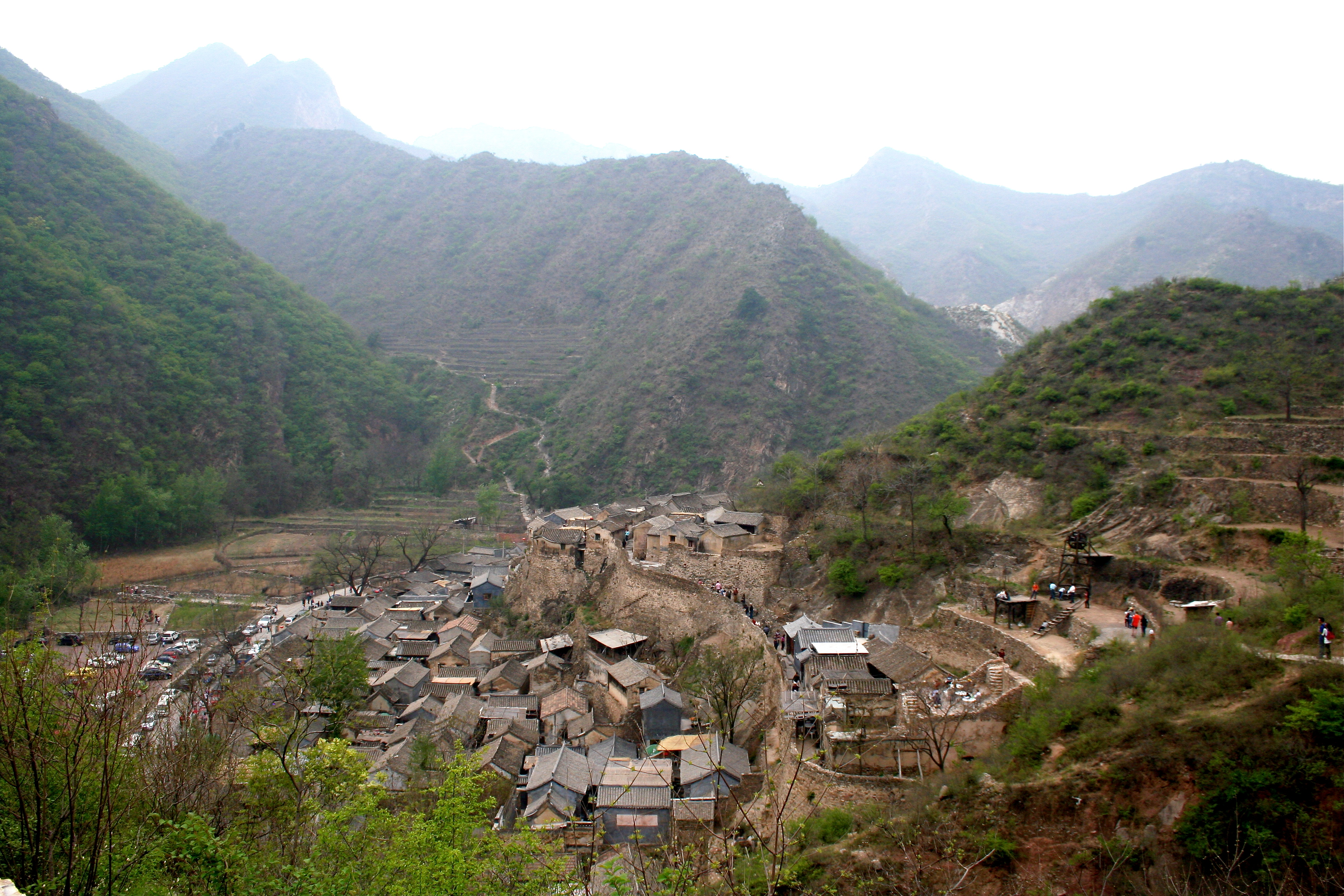
- Cuandixia Village

- Location in Beijing
- Country: People's Republic of China
- Direct-controlled municipality: Beijing
- District: Mentougou District
- Town: Zhaitang (斋堂镇)

Cuandixia (Chinese: 爨底下村) is a historic village dating from the Ming dynasty located in Zhaitang (斋堂镇), Mentougou District in Beijing, China. It is a popular tourist attraction known for its well preserved courtyard homes.

== Name ==
Cuan (爨) means "cooking-stove" in Chinese. This is an extremely unusual character and is so rare that it was not one of the characters that were deliberately simplified during the PRC's first simplification of characters in 1958. Nevertheless, many Chinese choose to write alternative versions of the name, using either 窜 (which is fourth tone rather than first tone) or 川 (which is pronounced chuan rather than cuan).

It is famous because it has a history of 400 years during the Ming Dynasty. At that time, Cuandixia's settlers migrated from the western Beijing province of Shanxi. The family name of all of the villagers living here is Han (韩/韓), which means that they share the same ancestor.

== Architecture ==
The houses here still maintain the style of Ming and Qing Dynasty. Therefore, it is an attractive historical site, where thousands of people come here from its surrounding cities. There are 500 houses left. Stone carving, brick carving, calligraphy, and painting are everywhere. Common figures used are bats, peonies, waterlilies, etc. Each of them has its typical meaning. The site is a National Village Architecture Reserve.

== Location ==
Cuandixia is located on ancient post road roughly 90 km northwest from central Beijing in the Jingxi mountain region.

== History ==
Cuandixia was founded during the Ming dynasty (1368–1644) by members of the Han clan who moved from Shanxi Province. Towards the end of the Qing Dynasty, Cuandixia prospered from trading in coal, fur, and grain.

== Attractions ==
Cuandixia is home to 500 well preserved courtyard homes dating to the Ming and Qing dynasties. Many of these homes have been converted into inns offering food and lodging to travelers. Stone paved lanes and steep staircases help define Cuandixia's architectural identity. The village is a frequent subject of photographers and painters.
