= Dongxinfang Subdistrict =

Dongxinfang Subdistrict 东辛房街道
- Subdistrict
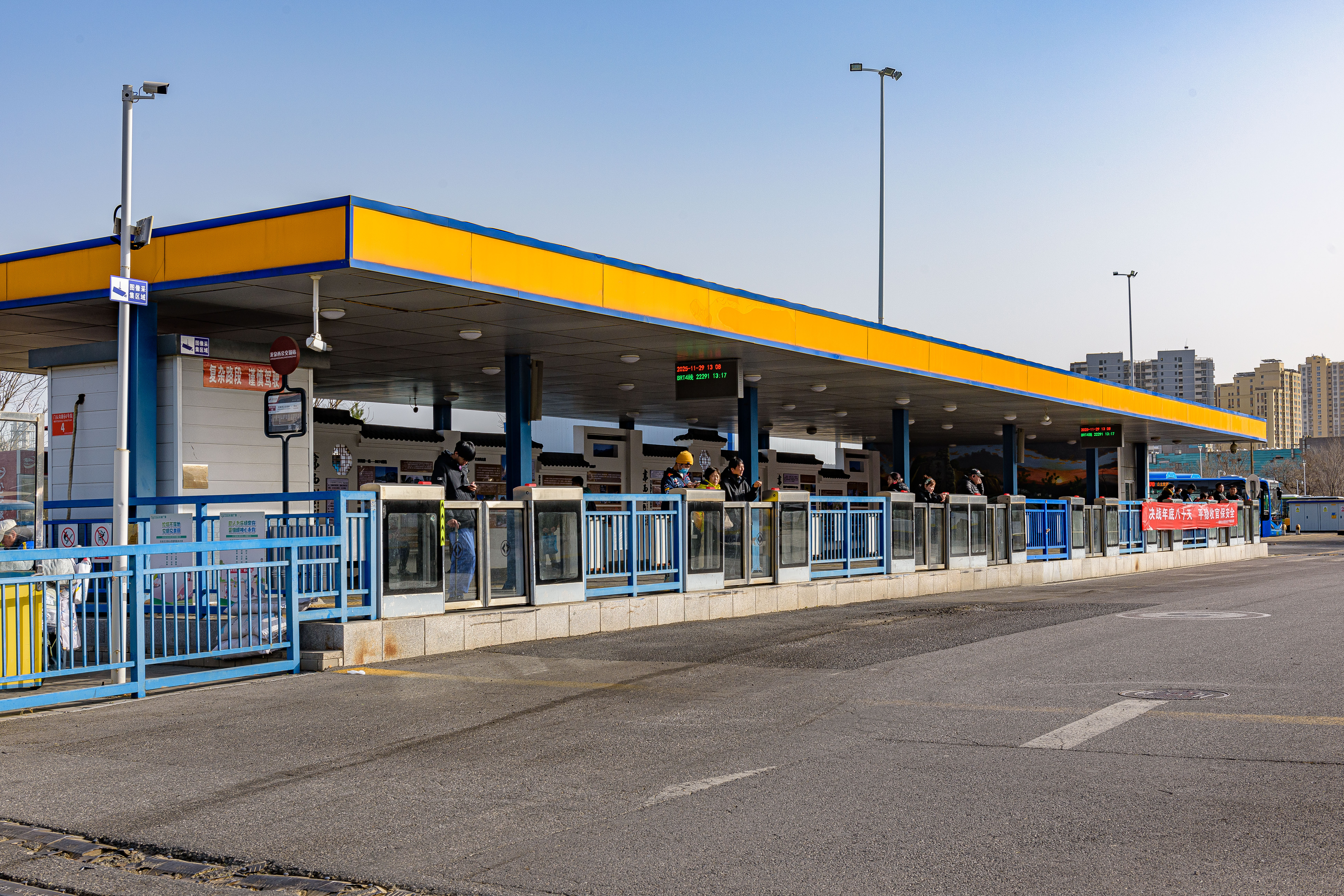

- Location within Beijing Location within China
- Coordinates: 39°55′45″N 116°03′43″E
- Country: China
- Municipality: Beijing
- District: Mentougou
- Village-level Divisions: 9 communities

Area
  - Total: 6.24 km^{2} (2.41 sq mi)

Population (2020)
  - Total: 36,076
  - Density: 5,780/km^{2} (15,000/sq mi)
- Time zone: UTC+8 (China Standard)
- Postal code: 102300
- Area code: 010

Dongxinfang Subdistrict (Chinese: 东辛房街道; pinyin: Dōngxīnfáng Jiēdào) is a subdistrict located within Mentougou District, Beijing, China. It borders Longquan Town and Chengzi Subdistrict in the north, Dayu Subdistrict in the east, Longquan and Tanzhesi Towns in the south, and Longquan Town in the west. Its population was 36,076.

The subdistrict took its name from Dongxinfang Village that used to exist within the region.

== History ==
Timeline of Dongxinfang Subdistrict's History
Year	Status
1952	Part of Mentougou Town, Jingxi Mining District
1955	Instituted as Dongxinfang Subdistrict
1969	Incorporated into Menchengzhen Management District
1971	Reorganized into Dongxinfang Subdistrict Revolutionary Committee
1981	Reinstated as a subdistrict

== Administrative Divisions ==
Dongxinfang Subdistrict oversaw 9 communities as of 2021:

Administrative division code	Subdivision names	Name transliteration
110109003003	北涧沟	Beijiangou
110109003021	西山	Xishan
110109003023	圈门	Quanmen
110109003024	石门营新区一区	Shimenying Xinqu Yiqu
110109003025	石门营新区五区	Shimenying Xinqu Wuqu
110109003026	石门营新区六区	Shimenying Xinqu Liuqu
110109003027	石门营新区七区	Shimenying Xinqu Qiqu
110109003028	石门营新区四区	Shimenying Xinqu Siqu
110109003029	石门营新区二区	Shimenying Xinqu Erqu

== See also ==
- List of township-level divisions of Beijing
