= Junzhuang =

Junzhuang Town 军庄镇
- Town
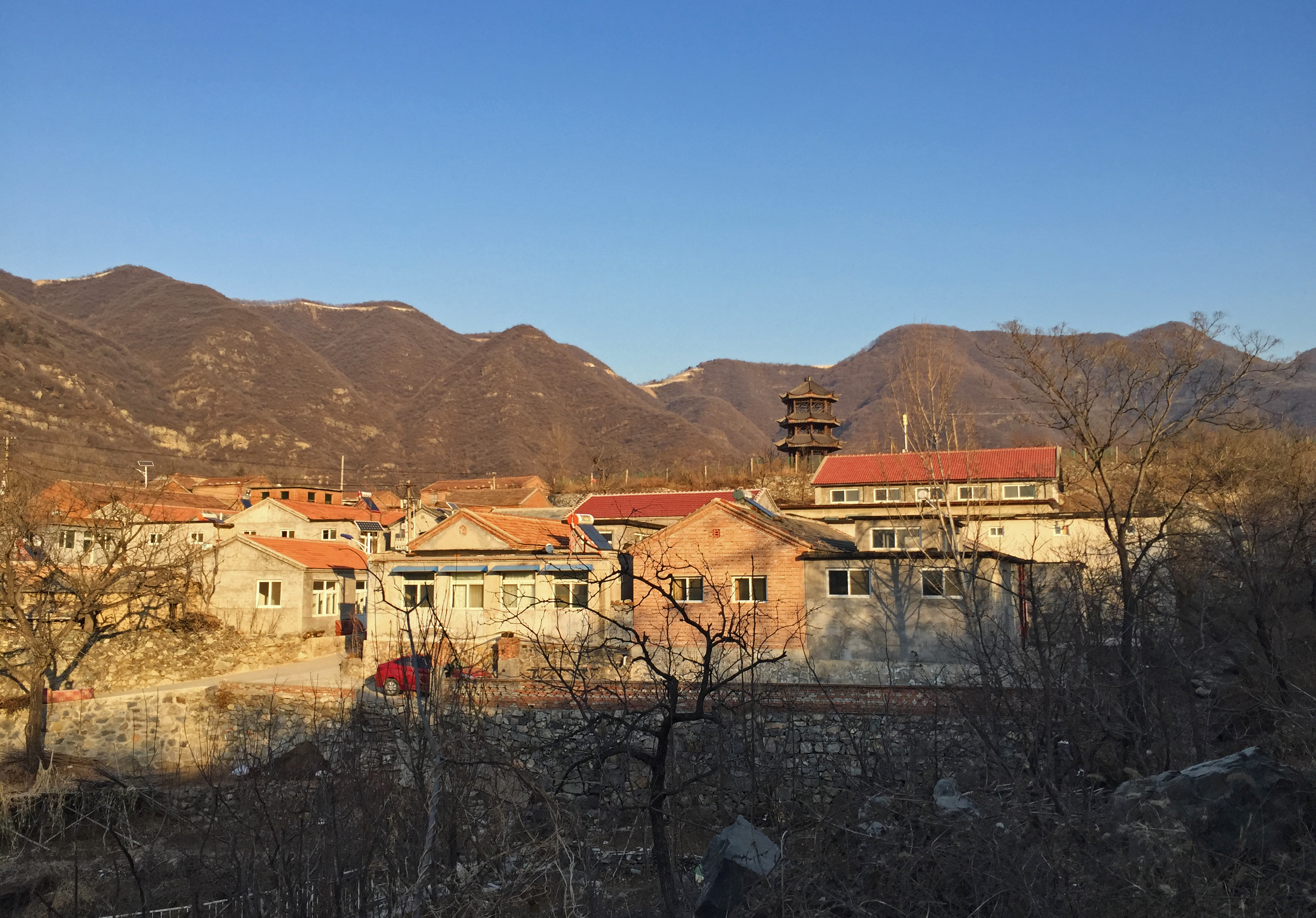
- Dongshan Village inside of the town, 2016

- Location within Beijing Location within China
- Coordinates: 40°00′09″N 116°05′49″E
- Country: China
- Municipality: Beijing
- District: Mentougou
- Village-level Divisions: 3 communities 8 villages

Area
  - Total: 33.34 km^{2} (12.87 sq mi)

Population (2020)
  - Total: 16,128
  - Density: 483.7/km^{2} (1,253/sq mi)
- Time zone: UTC+8 (China Standard)
- Postal code: 102300
- Area code: 010

Junzhuang Town (Chinese: 军庄镇; pinyin: Jūnzhuāng Zhèn) is a town on northeastern Mentougou District, Beijing, China. It is located on the south of Sujiatuo and Wenquan Towns, west of Xiangshan Subdistrict, north of Wulituo Subdistrict and Longquan Town, and East of Miaofengshan Town. In the year 2020, its population was 16,128.

The town took its name Junzhuang (Chinese: 军庄; lit. 'Military Villa') due to the fact that historically this region was frequently used as a station for military personnels.

== History ==
Timeline of Junzhuang Town's History
Year	Status
1949	Part of the 16th District of Wanping County
1953	Created as Junzhuang Township
1958	Part of Mentougou People's Commune
1962	Formed its own commune
1984	Reorganized into a township
1990	Reorganized into a town

== Administrative Divisions ==
As of 2021, Junzhuang Town was formed by 11 subdivisions, composed of 3 communities and 8 villages:

Administrative division code	Subdivision names	Name transliteration	Type
110109104001	杨坨	Yangtuo	Community
110109104002	北四	Beisi	Community
110109104003	惠通新苑	Huitong Xinyuan	Community
110109104201	军庄	Junzhuang	Village
110109104202	灰峪	Huiyu	Village
110109104203	西杨坨	Xi Yangtuo	Village
110109104204	东杨坨	Dong Yangtuo	Village
110109104205	孟悟	Mengwu	Village
110109104206	新村	Xincun	Village
110109104207	东山	Dongshan	Village
110109104208	香峪	Xiangyu	Village

== See also ==
- List of township-level divisions of Beijing
