= Yongding, Beijing =

Yongding Town 永定镇
- Town
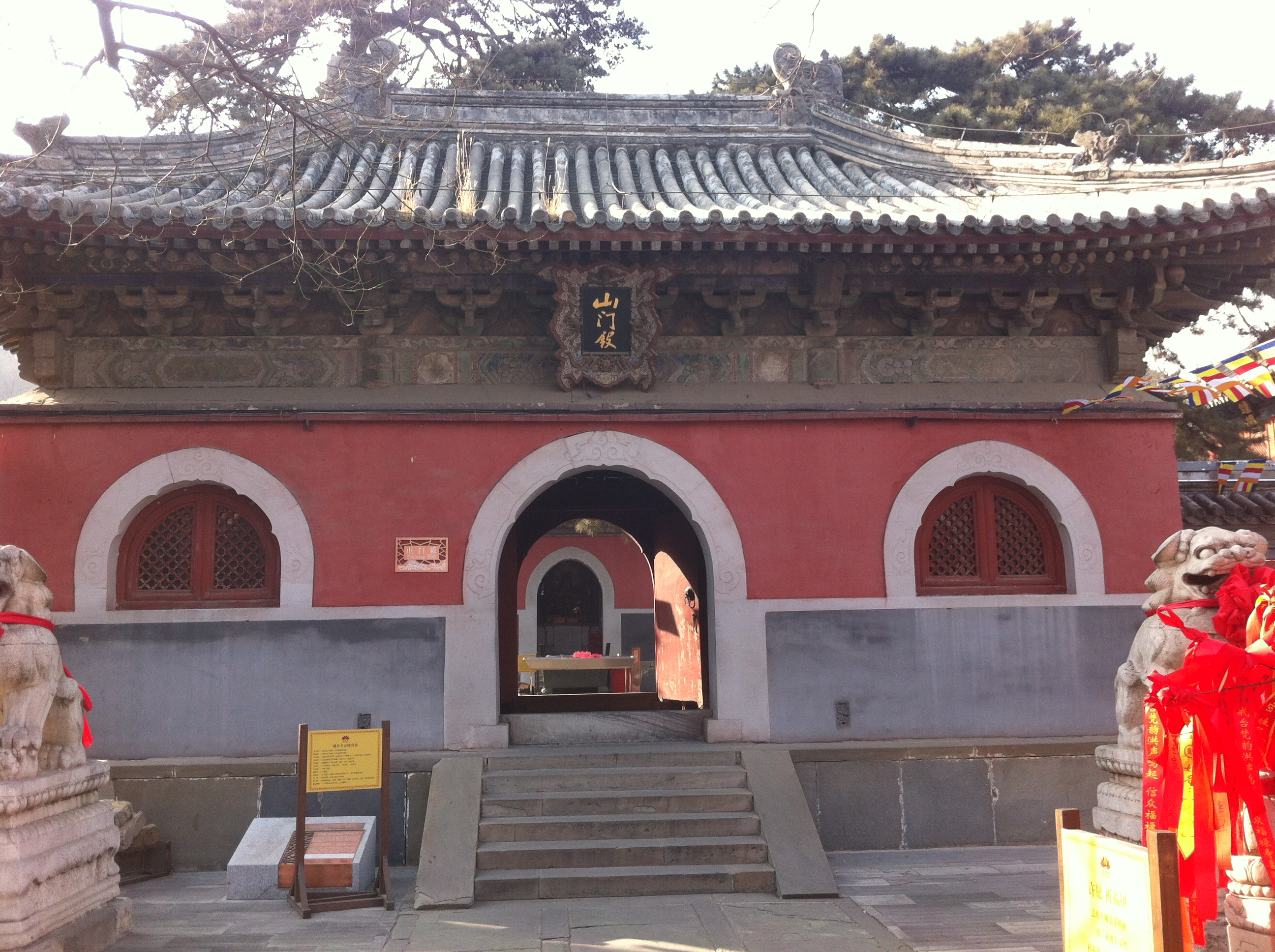
- Jietai Temple within the region, 2015

- Location within Beijing Location within China
- Coordinates: 39°54′06″N 116°06′15″E
- Country: China
- Municipality: Beijing
- District: Mentougou
- Village-level Divisions: 27 communities 24 villages

Area
  - Total: 64.38 km^{2} (24.86 sq mi)

Population (2020)
  - Total: 106,112
  - Density: 1,648/km^{2} (4,269/sq mi)
- Time zone: UTC+8 (China Standard)
- Postal code: 102308
- Area code: 010

Yongding Town (Chinese: 永定镇; pinyin: Yǒngdìng Zhèn) is a town that the southeastern corner of Mentougou District, Beijing, China. It borders Longquan Town, Dayu and Guangning Subdistricts in the north, Gucheng Subdistrict in the east, Wangzuo Town and Beigong Town in the south, Tanzhesi Town in the west, and has an exclave north of Tanzhesi Town. It had 106,112 people living within its borders as of 2020.

The area was named Yongding (Chinese: 永定; lit. 'Eternal Stability') after the Yongding River that passes through it.

== History ==
Timeline of Wangping Town's History
Time	Status
Ming and Qing dynasties	Part of Jingxi Township, Wanping Town
1946	Part of Liyuanzhuang Township, the 6th District, Wanping County
1948	Part of the 13th Outer Microdistrict
1952	Created as Shimenying Microdistrict, under Jingxi Mining District
1958	Changed to Shang'an Production team, under Mentougou People's Commune
1961	Renamed to Yongding People's Commune
1983	Changed to a township
1990	Changed to a town

== Administrative Divisions ==
As of 2021, Yongding Area had direct jurisdiction over 51 subdivisions, of which 27 were communities and 24 were villages:

Administrative division code	Subdivision names	Name transliteration	Type
110109006001	南区	Nanqu	Community
110109006002	北区	Beiqu	Community
110109006003	永兴	Yongxing	Community
110109006004	永安	Yong'an	Community
110109006005	信园	Xinyuan	Community
110109006006	嘉园	Jiayuan	Community
110109006007	永兴嘉园	Yongxing Jiayuan	Community
110109006008	小园一区	Xiaoyuan Yiqu	Community
110109006009	小园二区	Xiaoyuan Erqu	Community
110109006010	小园三区	Xiaoyuan Sanqu	Community
110109006011	曹各庄一区	Caogezhuang Yiqu	Community
110109006012	曹各庄二区	Caogezhuang Erqu	Community
110109006013	曹各庄三区	Caogezhuang Sanqu	Community
110109006014	润西山	Runxishan	Community
110109006015	梧桐苑	Wutongyuan	Community
110109006016	丽景长安	Lijing Chang'an	Community
110109006017	西悦嘉园	Xiyue Jiayuan	Community
110109006018	京西嘉苑	Jingxi Jiayuan	Community
110109006019	四季怡园	Siji Yiyuan	Community
110109006020	上悦嘉园	Shangyue Jiayuan	Community
110109006021	翡翠家园	Feicui Jiayuan	Community
110109006022	西山燕庐家园	Xishan Yanlu Jiayuan	Community
110109006023	迎晖北苑	Yinghui Beiyuan	Community
110109006024	迎晖南苑	Yinghui Nanyuan	Community
110109006025	云翔嘉苑	Yunxiang Jiayuan	Community
110109006026	云泽嘉苑	Yunze Jiayuan	Community
110109006027	云梦嘉苑	Yunmeng Jiayuan	Community
110109006201	上岸	Shang'an	Village
110109006202	桥户营	Qiaohuying	Village
110109006203	曹各庄	Caogezhuang	Village
110109006204	冯村	Fengcun	Village
110109006205	艾洼	Aiwa	Village
110109006206	万佛堂	Wanfotang	Village
110109006207	何各庄	Hegezhuang	Village
110109006208	石厂	Shichang	Village
110109006209	岢罗坨	Keluotuo	Village
110109006210	王村	Wangcun	Village
110109006211	石门营	Shimenying	Village
110109006212	小园	Xiaoyuan	Village
110109006213	栗元庄	Liyuanzhuang	Village
110109006214	卧龙岗	Wolonggang	Village
110109006215	西辛称	Xixincheng	Village
110109006216	东辛称	Dongxincheng	Village
110109006217	白庄子	Baizhuangzi	Village
110109006218	四道桥	Sidaoqiao	Village
110109006219	坝房子	Bafangzi	Village
110109006220	侯庄子	Houzhuangzi	Village
110109006221	贵石	Guishi	Village
110109006222	卫星队	Weixingdui	Village
110109006223	秋坡	Qiupo	Village
110109006224	石佛	Shifo	Village

== Landmark ==
- Jietai Temple

== See also ==
- List of township-level divisions of Beijing
