= Chengzi Subdistrict =

Chengzi Subdistrict 城子街道
- Subdistrict
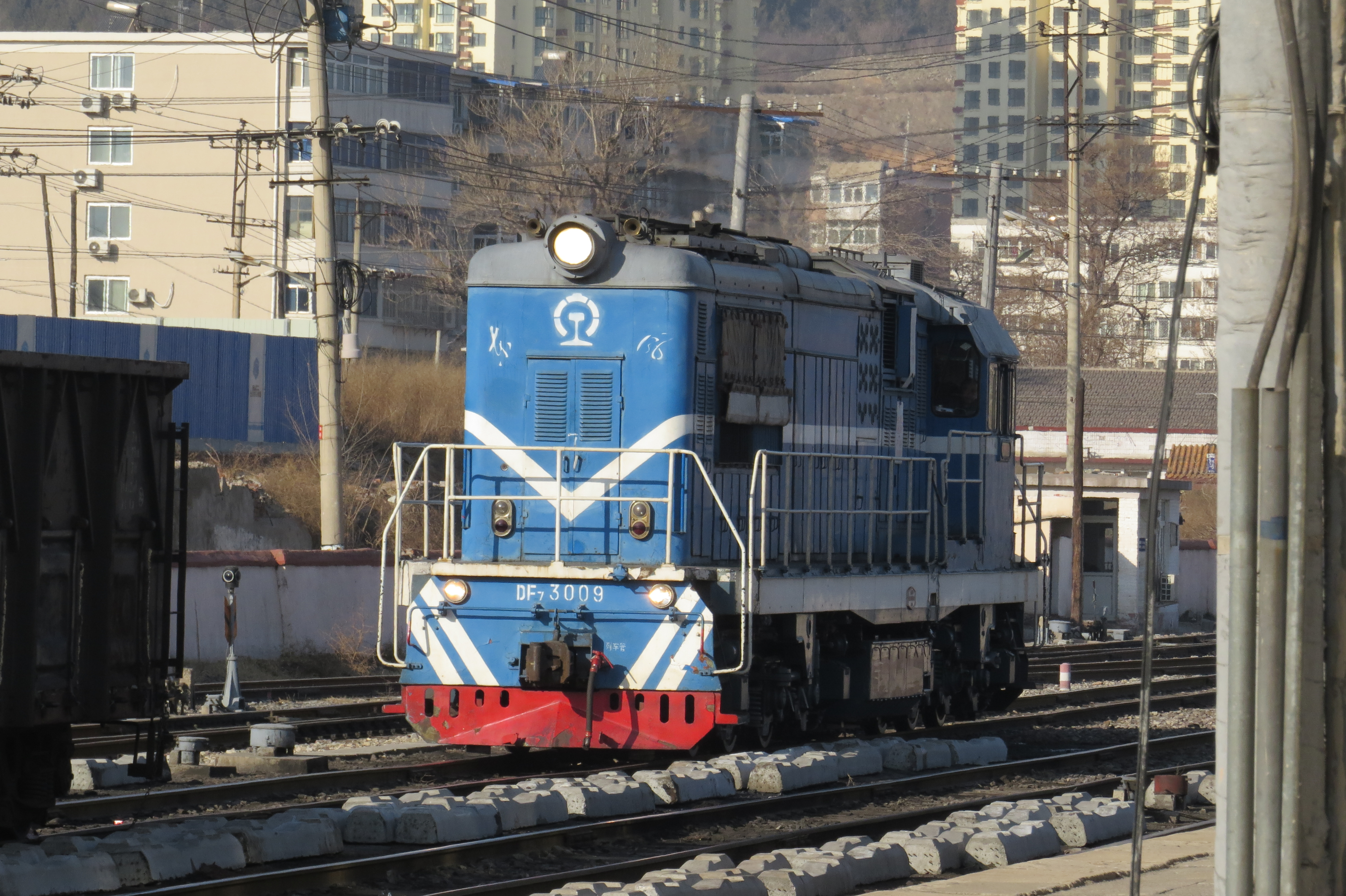
- Mentougou Station of Jingmen Railway within the subdistrict, 2016

- Location within Beijing Location within China
- Coordinates: 39°56′55″N 116°05′37″E
- Country: China
- Municipality: Beijing
- District: Mentougou
- Village-level Divisions: 20 communities

Area
  - Total: 2.81 km^{2} (1.08 sq mi)

Population (2020)
  - Total: 44,644
  - Density: 15,900/km^{2} (41,100/sq mi)
- Time zone: UTC+8 (China Standard)
- Postal code: 102399
- Area code: 010

Chengzi Subdistrict (Chinese: 城子街道; pinyin: Chéngzi Jiēdào) is a subdistrict that stands on eastern Mentougou District, Beijing, China. It borders Longquan Town in the north and west, Wulituo Subdistrict in the east, Dayu and Dongxinfang Subdistricts in the south. In the year 2020, its population was 44,644.

== History ==
Timeline of Chengzi Subdistrict‘s History
Year	Status
1955	Chengzi Subdistrict was formed, part of Jingxi Mining District
1958	Incorporated into Mentougou People's Commune
1962	Reinstated as a subdistrict
1969	Part of Menchengzhen Management District
1981	Subdistrict Revolutionary Committee was disbanded, and Subdistrict status was restored

== Administrative Divisions ==
As of 2021, Chengzi Subdistrict was formed from 20 communities:

Administrative division code	Subdivision names	Name transliteration
110109002001	市场街	Shichangjie
110109002002	桥东	Qiaodong
110109002003	城子大街	Chengzi Dajie
110109002007	城子西街	Chengzi Xijie
110109002008	七棵树东街	Qikeshu Dongjie
110109002011	广场	Guangchang
110109002012	向阳	Xiangyang
110109002015	七棵树西街	Qikeshu Xijie
110109002016	矿桥东街	Kuangqiao Dongjie
110109002017	西宁路	Xininglu
110109002018	华新建	Huaxinjian
110109002019	新老宿舍	Xinlao Sushe
110109002020	蓝龙家园	Lanlong Jiayuan
110109002021	龙门新区一区	Longmen Xinqu Yiqu
110109002022	龙门新区三区	Longmen Xinqu Sanqu
110109002023	龙门新区四区	Longmen XInqu Siqu
110109002024	龙门新区五区	Lonhmen XInqu Wuqu
110109002025	龙门新区六区	Longmen Xinqu Liuqu
110109002026	燕保家园	Yanbao Jiayuan
110109002027	城子东街	Chengzi Dongjie

== See also ==
- List of township-level divisions of Beijing
