= Wang Ping =

Wang Ping may refer to the following people surnamed Wang:

- Wang Ping (Three Kingdoms) (died 248), official during the Han dynasty and Shu of the Three Kingdoms period
- Wang Ping (filmmaker) (1916–1990), Chinese filmmaker and actress
- Wang Ping (Taiwanese actress) (born 1950), Taiwanese actress
- Wang Ping (author) (born 1957), Chinese-American author and academic

== See also ==
- Wangping (disambiguation), a list of places
- Ping Wang (disambiguation)
