= Wanping =

Wanping may refer to:

- Wanping, Hunan (万坪), a town in Yongshun County, Hunan, China
- Wanping Fortress, a walled fortress in Beijing, China

== See also ==
- Wangping (disambiguation)
