= Zhaitang =

Zhaitang Town 斋堂镇
- Town
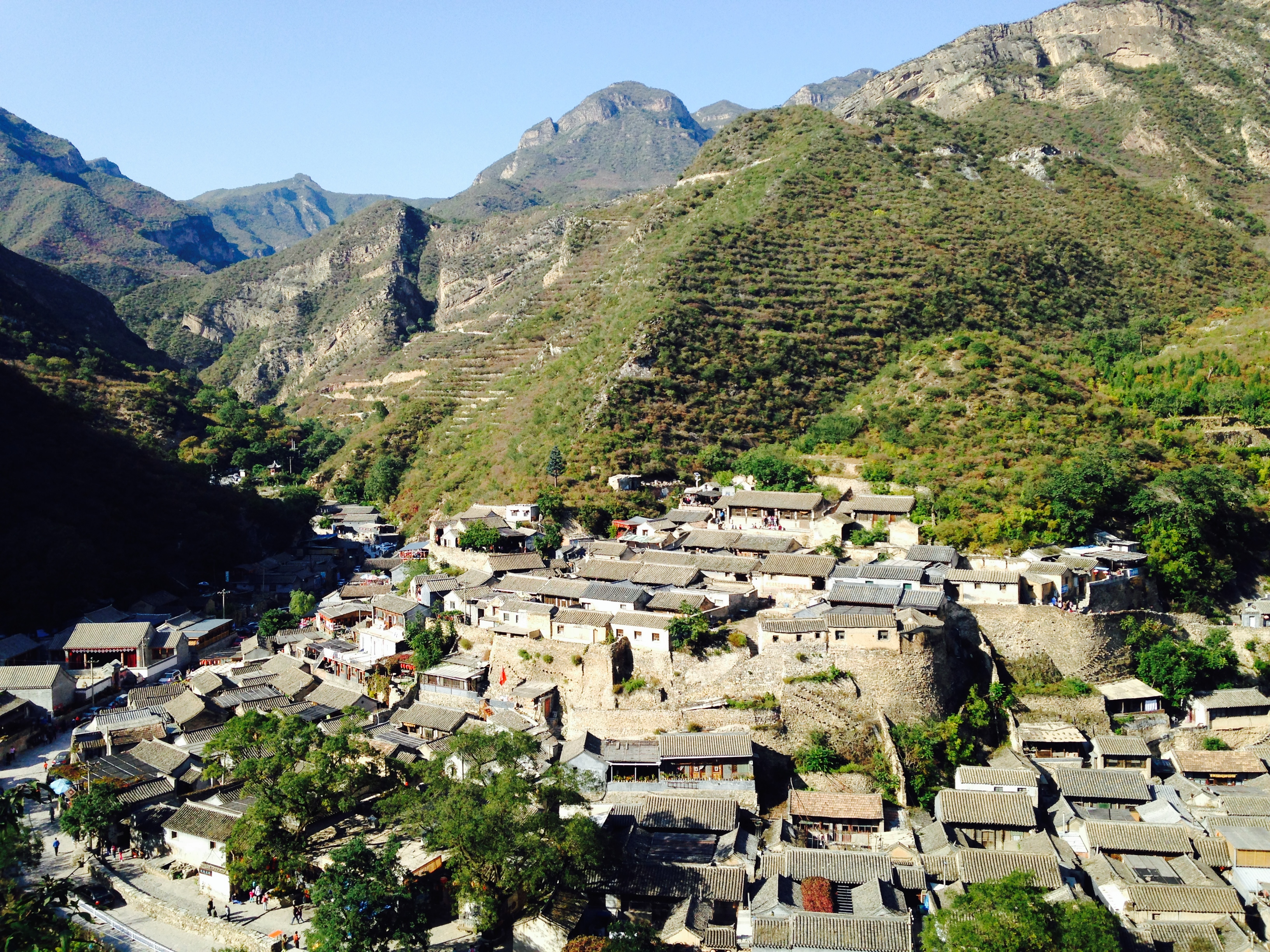
- Chuandixia Village within the town, 2014

- Location within Beijing Location within China
- Coordinates: 39°58′20″N 115°41′30″E
- Country: China
- Municipality: Beijing
- District: Mentougou
- Village-level Divisions: 1 communities 29 villages

Area
  - Total: 382.1 km^{2} (147.5 sq mi)

Population (2020)
  - Total: 7,486
  - Density: 19.59/km^{2} (50.74/sq mi)
- Time zone: UTC+8 (China Standard)
- Postal code: 102305
- Area code: 010

Zhaitang Town (Chinese: 斋堂镇; pinyin: Zhāitáng Zhèn) is a town in the western side of Mentougou District, Beijing, China. It shares border with Guanting Town in the north, Datai Subdistrict and Yanchi Town in the east, Da'anshan and Shijiaying Townships in the south, and QIngshui Town in the west. As of 2020, It had a population of 7,486.

The name Zhaitang (Chinese: 斋堂; lit. 'Buddhist Dining Room') came from Lingyue Temple within the town, which had been offering dinner to travelers and visitors during Tang dynasty.

== History ==
Timetable of Zhaitang Town
Time	Status
Tang dynasty	Part of Guangping County
Liao and Jin dynasties	Part of Yuhe County
Yuan to Qing dynasties	Part of Wanping County
1952	Part of Jingxi Mining District, Beijing
1958	Part of Mentougou District
1990	Zhaitang Town was founded
1994	Incorporated Yanhecheng Township
2001	Incorporated Junxiang Township

== Administrative Divisions ==
As of 2021, Zhaitang Town was composed of 30 subdivisions, of which 1 was a community and the other 29 were villages:

Administrative division code	Subdivision names	Name transliteration	Type
110109106002	斋堂小城镇	Zhaitang Xiaochengzhen	Community
110109106201	西斋堂	Xi Zhaitang	Village
110109106202	东斋堂	Dong Zhaitang	Village
110109106203	马栏	Malan	Village
110109106204	火村	Huocun	Village
110109106205	高铺	Gaopu	Village
110109106206	青龙涧	Qinglongjian	Village
110109106207	黄岭西	Huangling Xi	Village
110109106208	双石头	Huangshitou	Village
110109106209	川底下	Chuandixia	Village
110109106210	柏峪	Boyu	Village
110109106211	牛战	Niuzhan	Village
110109106212	白虎头	Baihutou	Village
110109106213	新兴村	Xinxingcun	Village
110109106214	向阳口	Xiangyangkou	Village
110109106215	沿河城	Yanhecheng	Village
110109106216	王龙口	Wanglongkou	Village
110109106217	沿河口	Yanhekou	Village
110109106218	龙门口	Longmenkou	Village
110109106219	林子台	Linzitai	Village
110109106220	西胡林	Xi Hulin	Village
110109106221	东胡林	Dong Hulin	Village
110109106222	军响	Junxiang	Village
110109106223	桑峪	Sangyu	Village
110109106224	灵水	Lingshui	Village
110109106225	法城	Facheng	Village
110109106226	杨家村	Yangjiacun	Village
110109106227	张家村	Zhangjiacun	Village
110109106228	吕家村	Lüjiacun	Village
110109106229	杨家峪	Yangjiayu	Village

== Climate ==
Zhaitang has a humid continental climate (Köppen climate classification Dwa). The average annual temperature in Zhaitang is 10.3 °C (50.5 °F). The average annual rainfall is 463.5 mm (18.25 in) with July as the wettest month. The temperatures are highest on average in July, at around 24.4 °C (75.9 °F), and lowest in January, at around −6.4 °C (20.5 °F).

Climate data for Zhaitang, elevation 440 m (1,440 ft), (1991–2020 normals, extremes 1981–present)
Month	Jan	Feb	Mar	Apr	May	Jun	Jul	Aug	Sep	Oct	Nov	Dec	Year
Record high °C (°F)	14.3 (57.7)	20.1 (68.2)	31.0 (87.8)	34.9 (94.8)	38.9 (102.0)	40.5 (104.9)	40.6 (105.1)	37.9 (100.2)	36.9 (98.4)	31.2 (88.2)	23.9 (75.0)	18.9 (66.0)	40.6 (105.1)
Mean daily maximum °C (°F)	1.6 (34.9)	5.4 (41.7)	12.3 (54.1)	20.4 (68.7)	26.5 (79.7)	29.9 (85.8)	30.7 (87.3)	29.7 (85.5)	25.6 (78.1)	18.9 (66.0)	9.8 (49.6)	3.0 (37.4)	17.8 (64.1)
Daily mean °C (°F)	−6.4 (20.5)	−2.7 (27.1)	4.5 (40.1)	12.9 (55.2)	19.0 (66.2)	22.7 (72.9)	24.4 (75.9)	22.9 (73.2)	17.7 (63.9)	10.6 (51.1)	2.1 (35.8)	−4.6 (23.7)	10.3 (50.5)
Mean daily minimum °C (°F)	−12.0 (10.4)	−8.8 (16.2)	−2.3 (27.9)	5.4 (41.7)	11.1 (52.0)	15.8 (60.4)	19.0 (66.2)	17.5 (63.5)	11.4 (52.5)	4.3 (39.7)	−3.5 (25.7)	−9.9 (14.2)	4.0 (39.2)
Record low °C (°F)	−22.6 (−8.7)	−19.3 (−2.7)	−16.3 (2.7)	−5.3 (22.5)	0.9 (33.6)	7.1 (44.8)	9.7 (49.5)	9.0 (48.2)	1.0 (33.8)	−7.9 (17.8)	−16.5 (2.3)	−19.5 (−3.1)	−22.6 (−8.7)
Average precipitation mm (inches)	1.2 (0.05)	4.3 (0.17)	6.9 (0.27)	20.1 (0.79)	38.3 (1.51)	79.0 (3.11)	142.7 (5.62)	86.3 (3.40)	49.9 (1.96)	23.8 (0.94)	9.5 (0.37)	1.5 (0.06)	463.5 (18.25)
Average precipitation days (≥ 0.1 mm)	1.3	2.4	3.0	5.4	7.5	11.8	13.3	11.6	8.4	5.3	2.5	1.2	73.7
Average snowy days	1.9	2.2	2.3	0.5	0	0	0	0	0	0.1	1.7	1.9	10.6
Average relative humidity (%)	45	42	39	40	46	60	73	75	70	60	53	47	54
Mean monthly sunshine hours	196.7	191.5	226.9	234.5	258.1	215.6	195.9	205.6	206.3	207.4	185.9	187.8	2,512.2
Percentage possible sunshine	65	63	61	59	58	48	43	49	56	61	63	65	58
Source: China Meteorological AdministrationAll-time June low

== See also ==
- List of township-level divisions of Beijing
