= Xinzhen Subdistrict, Beijing =

Xinzhen Subdistrict 新镇街道
- Subdistrict
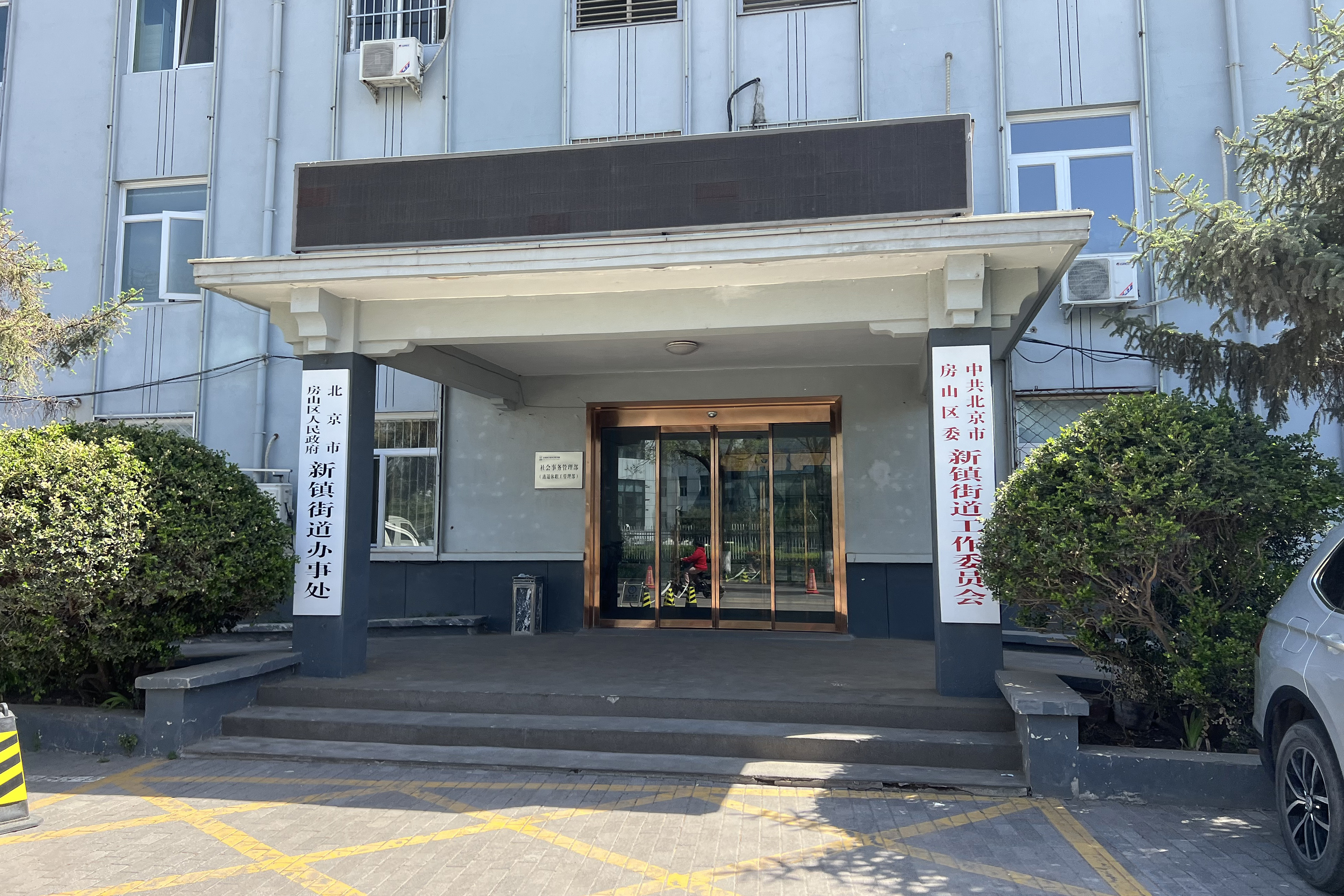

- Location within Beijing Location within China
- Coordinates: 39°44′11″N 116°03′21″E
- Country: China
- Municipality: Beijing
- District: Fangshan
- Village-level Divisions: 2 communities

Area
  - Total: 1.91 km^{2} (0.74 sq mi)

Population (2020)
  - Total: 10,681
  - Density: 5,590/km^{2} (14,500/sq mi)
- Time zone: UTC+8 (China Standard)
- Postal code: 102413
- Area code: 010

Xinzhen Subdistrict (Chinese: 新镇街道; pinyin: Xīnzhèn Jiēdào) is a subdistrict located on northeastern Fangshan District, Beijing, China. It borders Qinglonghu Town to the north, and Yanchun Town to the south. As of 2020, the subdistrict had 10,681 inhabitants living inside its borders.

This region was developed for research in atomic energy starting in 1950. The name Xinzhen (Chinese: 新镇; lit. 'New Town') was given by Guo Moruo during his visit of a local research facility in 1958.

== History ==
Timetable of Xinzhen Subdistrict
Year	Status
1955	401 Guaduate School was constructed in the region for research on atomic energy
1958	Given the name Xinzhen
1964	Established as Xinzhen Town
1968	Transferred to Dazi Caowu People's Commune
1979	Reinstated as a town
1989	Reorganized into a subdistrict

== Administrative Divisions ==
In 2021, Xinzhen Subdistrict administered 2 residential communities under it. They are listed in the table below:

Administrative division code	Subdivision names	Name transliteration
110111002003	东平街	Dongping Jie
110111002004	原新街	Yuanxin Jie

== See also ==
- List of township-level divisions of Beijing
