= Longquan, Beijing =

Longquan Town 龙泉镇
- Town
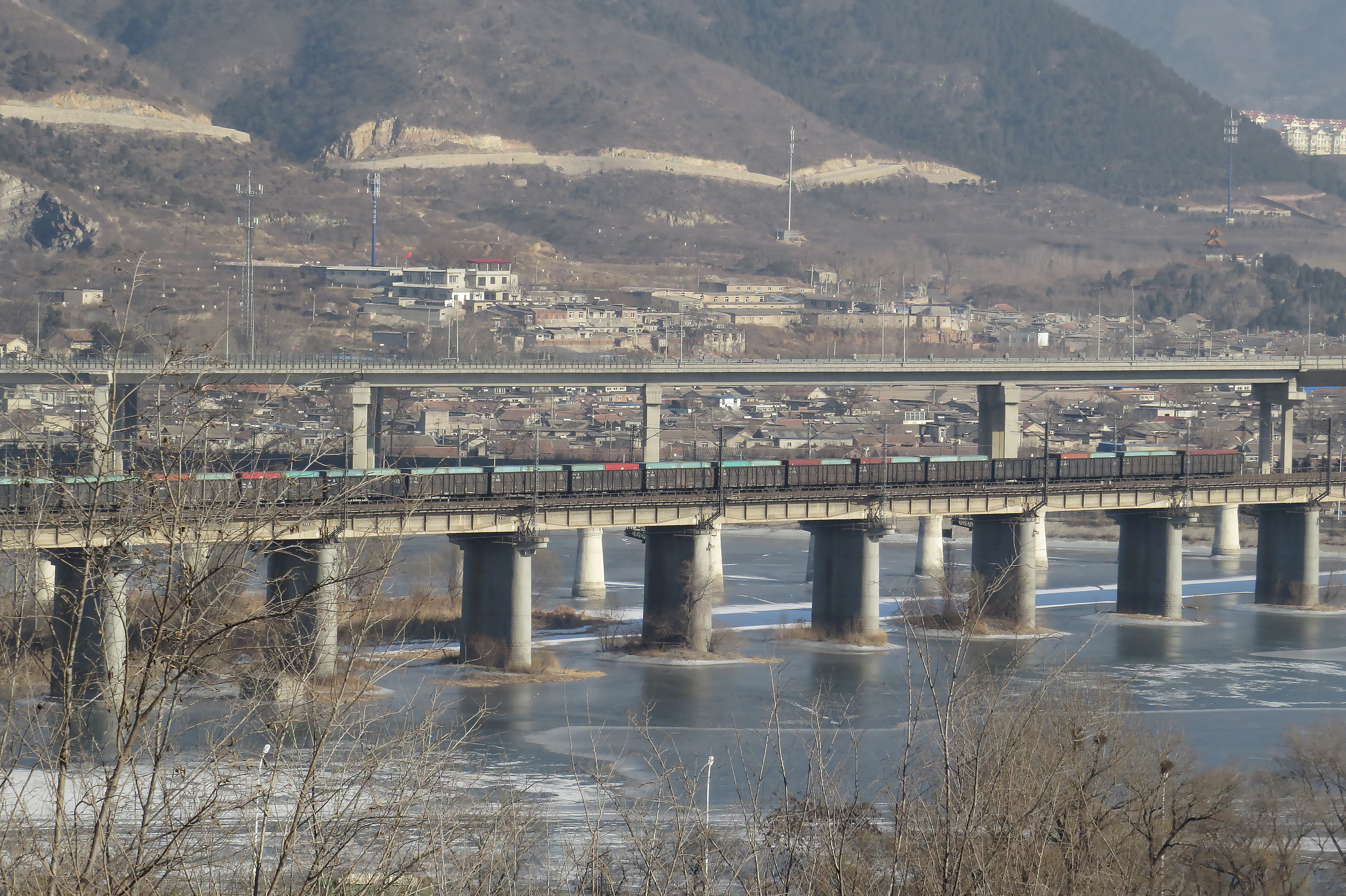
- First Bridge of Fengtai–Shacheng railway within the subdistrict, 2016

- Location within Beijing Location within China
- Coordinates: 39°56′35″N 116°05′19″E
- Country: China
- Municipality: Beijing
- District: Mentougou
- Village-level Divisions: 16 communities 17 villages

Area
  - Total: 37.05 km^{2} (14.31 sq mi)

Population (2020)
  - Total: 52,072
  - Density: 1,405/km^{2} (3,640/sq mi)
- Time zone: UTC+8 (China Standard)
- Postal code: 102399
- Area code: 010

Longquan Town (Chinese: 龙泉镇; pinyin: Lóngquán Zhèn) is a town that lies on the eastern side of Mentougou District, Beijing, China. It borders Miaofengshan and Junzhuang Towns to the north, Wulituo and Guangning Subdistricts to the east, Yongding and Tantuo Towns to the south, Yongding and Wangping to the west. In 2020, Longquan had a census population of 52,072.

The name Longquan (Chinese: 龙泉; lit. 'Dragon Spring') was given for the town's location near Jiulong Mountain and Yongding River.

== History ==
Timetable of Longquan Town
Year	Status
1949	Known as Mentougou Town
1958	Mentougou People's Commune was created
1983	Converted to a township
1990	Converted to a town
2011	Became an area while retaining the status of town

== Administrative Divisions ==
As of 2021, Longquan Area consisted of 33 subdivisions, with 16 communities and 17 villages:

Administrative division code	Subdivision names	Name transliteration	Type
110109007001	东南街	Dongnan Jie	Community
110109007002	中北街	Zhongbei Jie	Community
110109007003	西前街	Xiqian Jie	Community
110109007004	水闸西路	Shuizhaxi Jie	Community
110109007005	琉璃渠	Liuliqu	Community
110109007006	龙泉务	Longquanwu	Community
110109007007	梨园	Liyuan	Community
110109007008	峪新	Yuxin	Community
110109007009	倚山嘉园	Yishan Jiayuan	Community
110109007010	中门家园	Zhongmen Jiayuan	Community
110109007011	龙门新区二区	Longmen Xinqu Erqu	Community
110109007012	中门寺南坡一区	Zhongmensi Nanpo Yiqu	Community
110109007013	中门寺南坡二区	Zhongmensi Nanpo Erqu	Community
110109007014	高家园新区	Gaojiayuan Xinqu	Community
110109007015	西山艺境	Xishan Yijing	Community
110109007016	大峪花园	Dayu Huayuan	Community
110109007201	大峪	Dayu	Village
110109007202	城子	Chengzi	Village
110109007203	龙泉雾	Longquanwu	Village
110109007204	琉璃渠	Liuliqu	Village
110109007205	三家店	Sanjiadian	Village
110109007206	中门寺	Zhongmensi	Village
110109007207	门头口	Mentoukou	Village
110109007208	天桥浮	Tianqiaofu	Village
110109007209	三店	Sandian	Village
110109007210	西龙门	Xi Longmen	Village
110109007211	东龙门	Dong Longmen	Village
110109007212	西辛房	Xi Xinfang	Village
110109007213	东辛房	Dong Xinfang	Village
110109007214	石石巷	Shishixiang	Village
110109007215	滑石道	Huashidao	Village
110109007216	岳家坡	Yuejiapo	Village
110109007217	赵家洼	Zhaojiawa	Village

== See also ==
- List of township-level divisions of Beijing
