= Wang Bing =

Wang Bing may refer to:

- Wang Bing (canoeist) (born 1978), Chinese Olympic canoer
- Wang Bing (director) (born 1967), Chinese documentary film director
- Bing Wang (producer) (born 1961), Taiwanese music producer; father of singer-songwriter Joanna Wang
- Bing Wang (violinist), on the faculty at the USC Thornton School of Music
