= Mentougou, Beijing =

Mentougou 门头沟区
- District
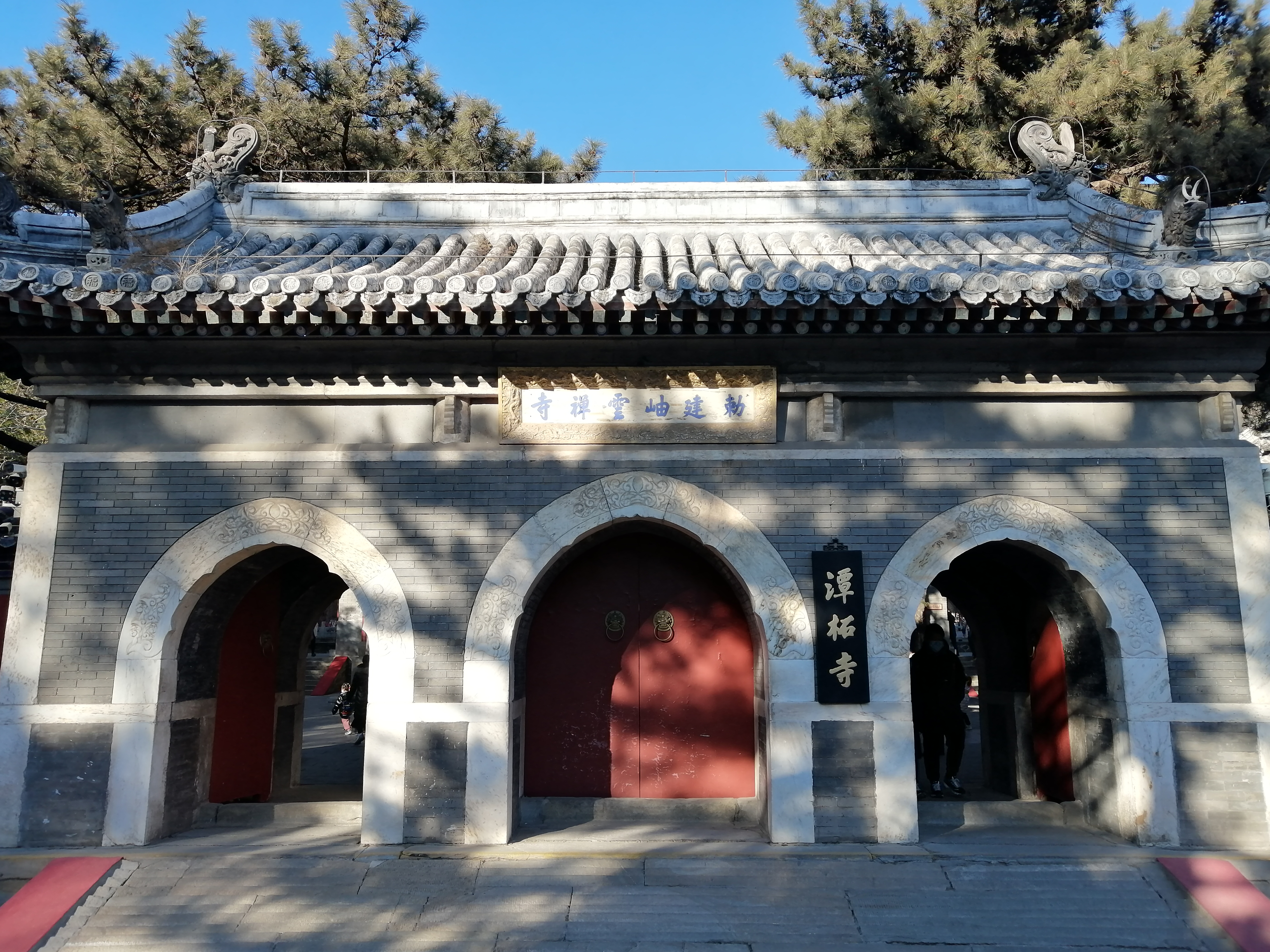
- Tanzhe Temple's Entrance

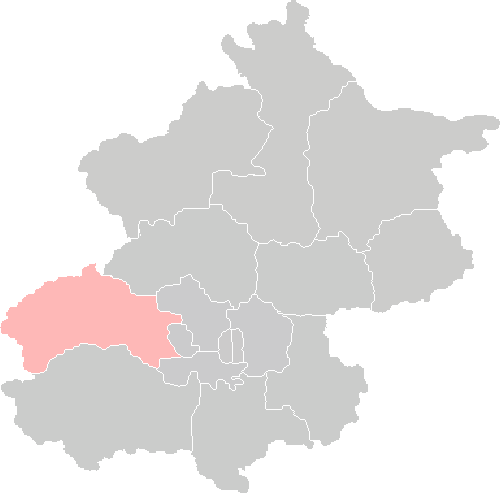
- Location of Mentougou District in Beijing
- Interactive map of Mentougou
- Coordinates (Mentougou government): 39°56′25″N 116°06′05″E
- Country: People's Republic of China
- Municipality: Beijing
- Township-level divisions: 4 subdistricts 9 towns

Area
  - Total: 1,321 km^{2} (510 sq mi)

Population (2020)
  - Total: 392,606
  - Density: 297.2/km^{2} (769.8/sq mi)
- Time zone: UTC+8 (China Standard)
- Area code: 0010

Mentougou District (Chinese: 门头沟区; pinyin: Méntóugōu Qū) is a district of the city of Beijing. It is at the western part of the city. Spanning 1,321 square kilometres (510 sq mi), with 392,606 inhabitants (2020 Census), it is subdivided into 4 subdistricts and 9 towns. It borders the Beijing districts of Changping to the northeast, Haidian and Shijingshan to the east, Fengtai to the southeast, and Fangshan to the south, as well as Hebei province to the west and northwest.

It lies in the Western Hills of Beijing and is mountainous in terrain. In fact, the mountainous terrain—including a hundred or more peaks—occupy a stunning 93% of the entire area.

== Tourism ==
Mentougou District is gaining popularity as a tourist destination. Among its main sights are Jietai Temple, Tanzhe Temple, Longmen Gully (or Canyon), Mount Baihua, Mount Ling (the highest mountain in Beijing at 2,303 metres), Mount Miaofeng, and Cuandixia Village.

== Transport ==
=== Road ===
The 6th Ring Road runs through the eastern part of Mentougou District.

=== Metro ===
Mentougou District is served by one line of the Beijing Subway.

- Line S1 - Shichang, Xiaoyuan, Liyuanzhuang, Shang'an, Qiaohuying, Sidaoqiao

== Administrative divisions ==
There are 4 subdistricts and 9 towns in the district.

Name	Chinese (S)	Hanyu Pinyin	Population (2010)	Area (km^{2})
Dayu Subdistrict	大峪街道	Dàyù Jiēdào	80,413	4.40
Chengzi Subdistrict	城子街道	Chéngzi Jiēdào	34,555	2.90
Dongxinfang Subdistrict	东辛房街道	Dōngxīnfáng Jiēdào	27,335	18.00
Datai Subdistrict	大台街道	Dàtái Jiēdào	11,296	81.00
Wangping town	王平镇	Wángpíng Zhèn	6,513	46.00
Yongding town	永定镇	Yǒngdìng Zhèn	42,446	68.60
Longquan town	龙泉镇	Lóngquán Zhèn	32,149	49.00
Tanzhesi town	潭柘寺镇	Tánzhèsì Zhèn	8,672	73.20
Junzhuang town	军庄镇	Jūnzhuāng Zhèn	12,516	34.00
Yanchi town	雁翅镇	Yànchì Zhèn	6,587	239.00
Zhaitang town	斋堂镇	Zhāitáng Zhèn	10,817	392.40
Qingshui town	清水镇	Qīngshuǐ Zhèn	7,906	339.00
Miaofengshan town	妙峰山镇	Miàofēngshān Zhèn	9,271	110.00

== Climate ==
Mentougou District has a humid continental climate (Köppen climate classification Dwa). The average annual temperature in Mentougou is 12.9 °C (55.2 °F). The average annual rainfall is 568.6 mm (22.39 in) with July as the wettest month. The temperatures are highest on average in July, at around 26.6 °C (79.9 °F), and lowest in January, at around −3.0 °C (26.6 °F).

Climate data for Mentougou District, elevation 86 m (282 ft), (1991–2020 normals, extremes 1961–present)
Month	Jan	Feb	Mar	Apr	May	Jun	Jul	Aug	Sep	Oct	Nov	Dec	Year
Record high °C (°F)	14.7 (58.5)	26.1 (79.0)	28.8 (83.8)	33.4 (92.1)	41.3 (106.3)	40.3 (104.5)	41.8 (107.2)	37.5 (99.5)	34.8 (94.6)	30.7 (87.3)	22.0 (71.6)	20.3 (68.5)	41.8 (107.2)
Mean daily maximum °C (°F)	2.4 (36.3)	6.1 (43.0)	13.0 (55.4)	20.9 (69.6)	27.1 (80.8)	30.6 (87.1)	31.4 (88.5)	30.4 (86.7)	26.2 (79.2)	19.2 (66.6)	10.4 (50.7)	3.8 (38.8)	18.5 (65.2)
Daily mean °C (°F)	−3.0 (26.6)	0.3 (32.5)	7.1 (44.8)	14.9 (58.8)	21.1 (70.0)	24.9 (76.8)	26.6 (79.9)	25.4 (77.7)	20.3 (68.5)	13.2 (55.8)	4.8 (40.6)	−1.4 (29.5)	12.9 (55.1)
Mean daily minimum °C (°F)	−7.4 (18.7)	−4.7 (23.5)	1.4 (34.5)	8.5 (47.3)	14.5 (58.1)	19.4 (66.9)	22.2 (72.0)	21.0 (69.8)	15.3 (59.5)	8.0 (46.4)	0.2 (32.4)	−5.6 (21.9)	7.7 (45.9)
Record low °C (°F)	−19.8 (−3.6)	−22.9 (−9.2)	−15.2 (4.6)	−4.2 (24.4)	3.1 (37.6)	8.8 (47.8)	13.7 (56.7)	10.4 (50.7)	3.7 (38.7)	−4.5 (23.9)	−13.0 (8.6)	−16.7 (1.9)	−22.9 (−9.2)
Average precipitation mm (inches)	2.0 (0.08)	5.2 (0.20)	9.3 (0.37)	20.5 (0.81)	36.3 (1.43)	84.9 (3.34)	202.9 (7.99)	112.0 (4.41)	55.6 (2.19)	24.5 (0.96)	13.0 (0.51)	2.4 (0.09)	568.6 (22.38)
Average precipitation days (≥ 0.1 mm)	1.3	2.2	3.0	4.6	6.1	10.5	13.1	10.7	7.3	5.2	3.0	1.6	68.6
Average snowy days	2.3	2.3	1.1	0.2	0	0	0	0	0	0	1.6	2.2	9.7
Average relative humidity (%)	42	41	39	41	47	58	71	73	67	59	52	44	53
Mean monthly sunshine hours	173.4	171.7	208.9	223.5	242.8	193.1	158.7	176.5	187.9	181.6	155.5	163.3	2,236.9
Percentage possible sunshine	58	56	56	56	54	43	35	42	51	53	53	56	51
Source: China Meteorological Administration

Climate data for Zhaitang, elevation 440 m (1,440 ft), (1991–2020 normals, extremes 1981–present)
Month	Jan	Feb	Mar	Apr	May	Jun	Jul	Aug	Sep	Oct	Nov	Dec	Year
Record high °C (°F)	14.3 (57.7)	23.9 (75.0)	31.0 (87.8)	35.2 (95.4)	38.9 (102.0)	41.1 (106.0)	41.3 (106.3)	38.7 (101.7)	36.9 (98.4)	31.2 (88.2)	26.5 (79.7)	19.2 (66.6)	41.3 (106.3)
Mean daily maximum °C (°F)	1.6 (34.9)	5.4 (41.7)	12.3 (54.1)	20.4 (68.7)	26.5 (79.7)	29.9 (85.8)	30.7 (87.3)	29.7 (85.5)	25.6 (78.1)	18.9 (66.0)	9.8 (49.6)	3.0 (37.4)	17.8 (64.1)
Daily mean °C (°F)	−6.4 (20.5)	−2.7 (27.1)	4.5 (40.1)	12.9 (55.2)	19.0 (66.2)	22.7 (72.9)	24.4 (75.9)	22.9 (73.2)	17.7 (63.9)	10.6 (51.1)	2.1 (35.8)	−4.6 (23.7)	10.3 (50.5)
Mean daily minimum °C (°F)	−12.0 (10.4)	−8.8 (16.2)	−2.3 (27.9)	5.4 (41.7)	11.1 (52.0)	15.8 (60.4)	19.0 (66.2)	17.5 (63.5)	11.4 (52.5)	4.3 (39.7)	−3.5 (25.7)	−9.9 (14.2)	4.0 (39.2)
Record low °C (°F)	−24.2 (−11.6)	−19.5 (−3.1)	−16.3 (2.7)	−5.5 (22.1)	−0.9 (30.4)	7.4 (45.3)	9.7 (49.5)	9.0 (48.2)	1.0 (33.8)	−7.9 (17.8)	−16.5 (2.3)	−22.3 (−8.1)	−24.2 (−11.6)
Average precipitation mm (inches)	1.2 (0.05)	4.3 (0.17)	6.9 (0.27)	20.1 (0.79)	38.3 (1.51)	79.0 (3.11)	142.7 (5.62)	86.3 (3.40)	49.9 (1.96)	23.8 (0.94)	9.5 (0.37)	1.5 (0.06)	463.5 (18.25)
Average precipitation days (≥ 0.1 mm)	1.3	2.4	3.0	5.4	7.5	11.8	13.3	11.6	8.4	5.3	2.5	1.2	73.7
Average snowy days	1.9	2.2	2.3	0.5	0	0	0	0	0	0.1	1.7	1.9	10.6
Average relative humidity (%)	45	42	39	40	46	60	73	75	70	60	53	47	54
Mean monthly sunshine hours	196.7	191.5	226.9	234.5	258.1	215.6	195.9	205.6	206.3	207.4	185.9	187.8	2,512.2
Percentage possible sunshine	65	63	61	59	58	48	43	49	56	61	63	65	58
Source: China Meteorological Administration
