= King Ping =

King Ping may refer to:

- King Ping of Zhou (reigned 771–720 BC), king of the Zhou dynasty
- King Ping of Chu (r. 528–516 BC), king of the State of Chu
- Prince Ping of Liang (r. 137–97 BC), prince of Liang under the Han dynasty
- A type of school handball
