= Wangping, Beijing =

Wangping Town 王平镇
- Town
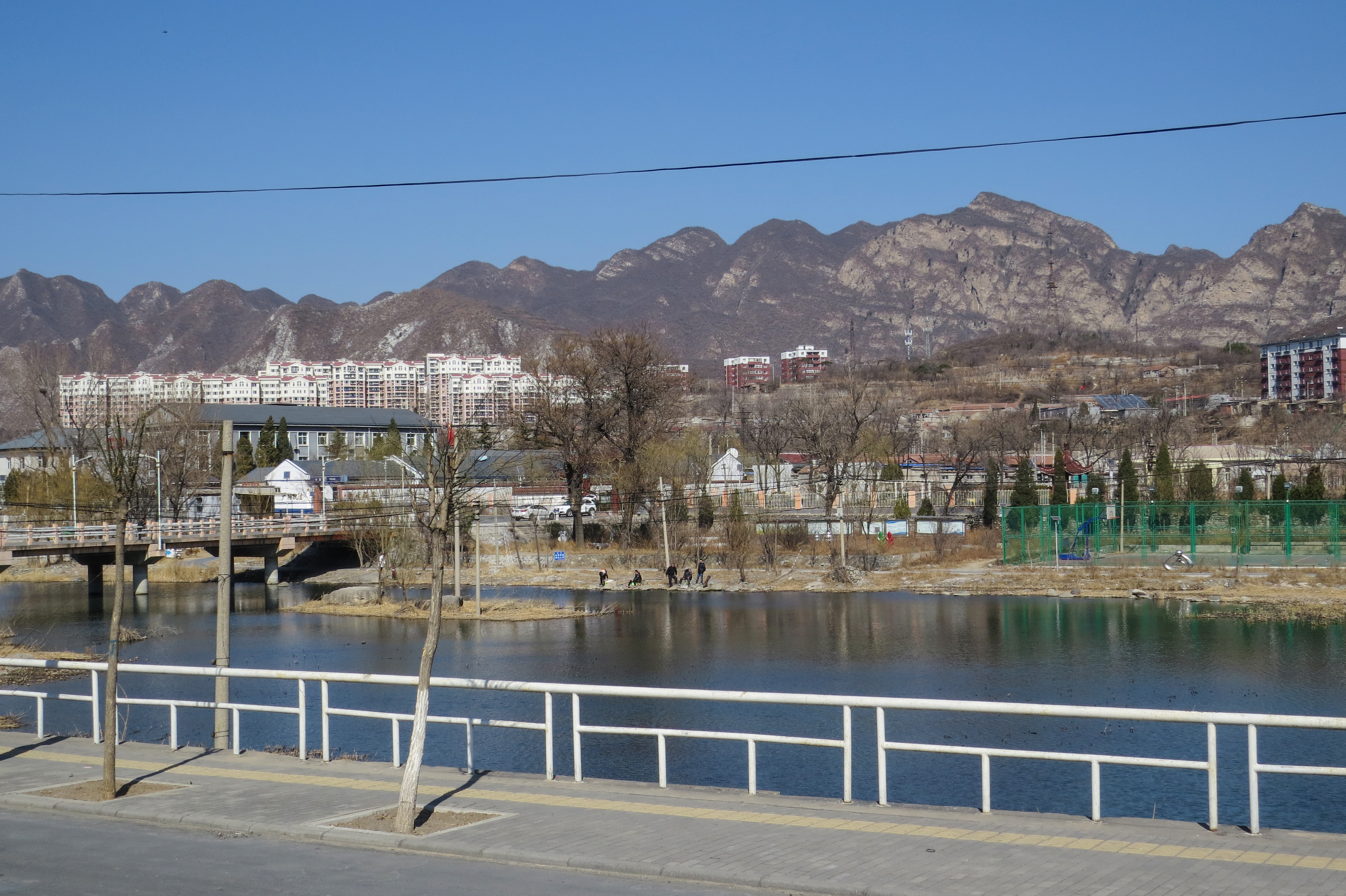
- Wangping Village, 2017

- Location within Beijing Location within China
- Coordinates: 39°58′06″N 115°59′15″E
- Country: China
- Municipality: Beijing
- District: Mentougou
- Village-level Divisions: 4 communities 16 villages

Area
  - Total: 47.7 km^{2} (18.4 sq mi)

Population (2020)
  - Total: 7,013
  - Density: 147/km^{2} (381/sq mi)
- Time zone: UTC+8 (China Standard)
- Postal code: 102303
- Area code: 010

Wangping Town (Chinese: 王平镇; pinyin: Wángpíng Zhèn) is a town on the eastern side of Mentougou District, Beijing, China. It borders Miaofengshan Town in its northeast, Dongxinfang Subdistrict and Longquan Town in its southeast, Yongding Town and Datai Subdistrict in its south, and Yanchi Town in its northwest. Its population was 7,013 as of 2020.

== History ==
Timeline of Wangping Town
Year	Status
1949	Part of the 28th District of Beijing
1958	Part of Datai People's Commune
1963	Organized into Wangpingcun Subdistrict
1981	Part of Industrial & Agricultural District under Beijing Bureau of Mining Affairs
1994	Shaishufen, Beiling Townships and Wangpingcun Subdistrict merged to form Wangping Area
2002	Became a town while retaining the status as an area

== Administrative Divisions ==
In the year 2021, Wangping Town was divided into 20 subdivisions, 4 of them were communities and the other 16 were villages:

Administrative division code	Subdivision names	Name transliteration	Type
110109005001	色树坟	Shaishufen	Community
110109005002	河北	Hebei	Community
110109005005	西苑	Xiyuan	Community
110109005006	惠和新苑	Huihe Xinyuan	Community
110109005201	安家庄村	Anjiazhuang Cun	Village
110109005202	吕家坡村	Lüjiapo Cun	Village
110109005203	西王平村	Xi Wangping Cun	Village
110109005204	东王平村	Dong Wangping Cun	Village
110109005205	南涧村	Nanjian Cun	Village
110109005206	河北村	Hebei Cun	Village
110109005207	色树坟村	Shaishufen Cun	Village
110109005208	西石古岩村	Xi Shiguyan Cun	Village
110109005209	东石古岩村	Dong Shiguyan Cun	Village
110109005210	西马各庄村	Xi Magezhang Cun	Village
110109005211	东马各庄村	Dong Magezhang Cun	Village
110109005212	南港村	Nangang Cun	Village
110109005213	韭园村	Jiuyuan Cun	Village
110109005214	桥耳涧村	Qiao'erjian Cun	Village
110109005215	西落坡村	Xi Luopo Cun	Village
110109005216	东落坡村	Dong Luopo Cun	Village

== See also ==
- List of township-level divisions of Beijing
