= Western Hills =

Mountain range in western Beijing

Coordinates: 39°59′27″N 116°10′21″E

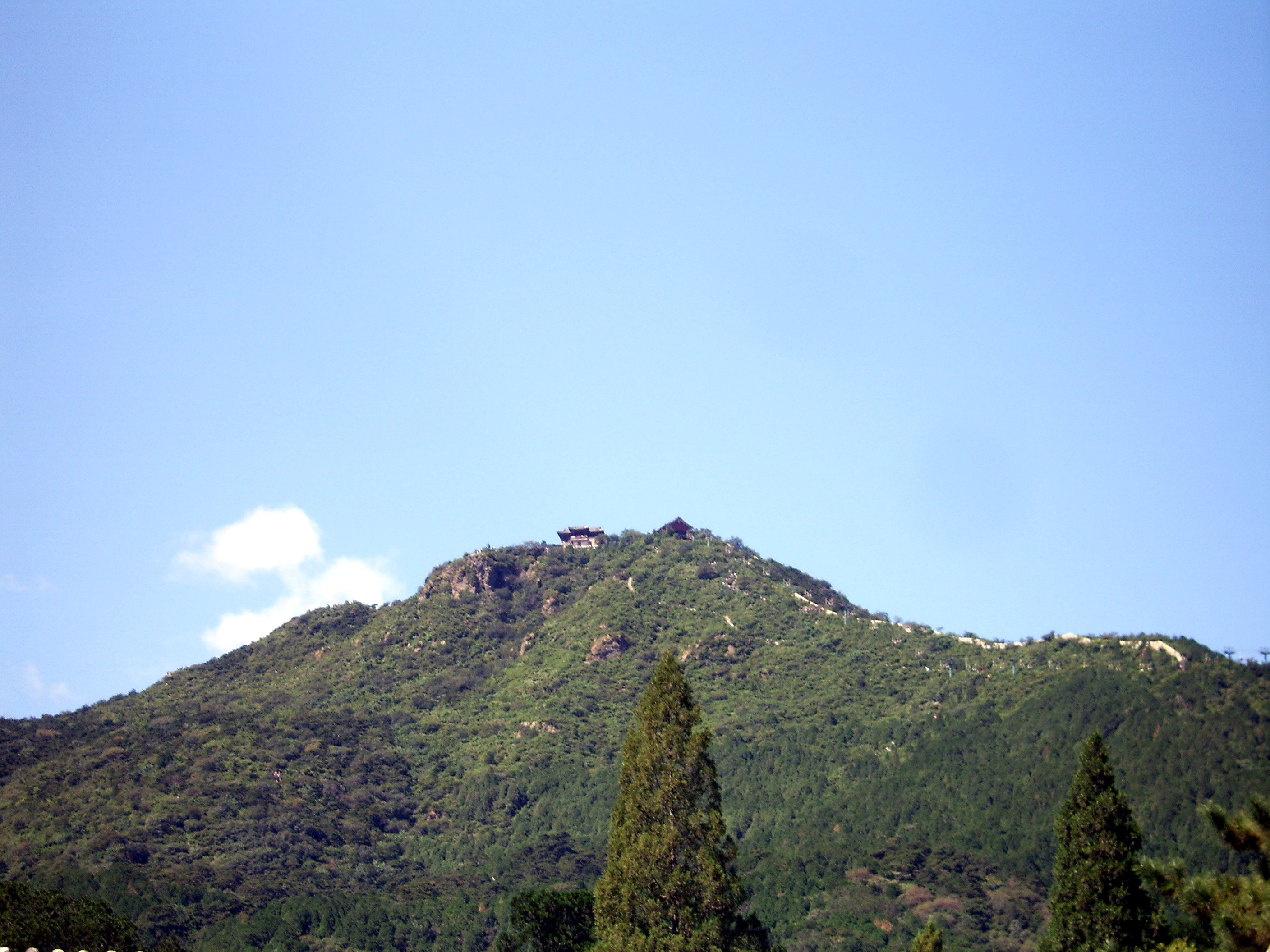
The Fragrant Hills, a popular park in the Western Hills

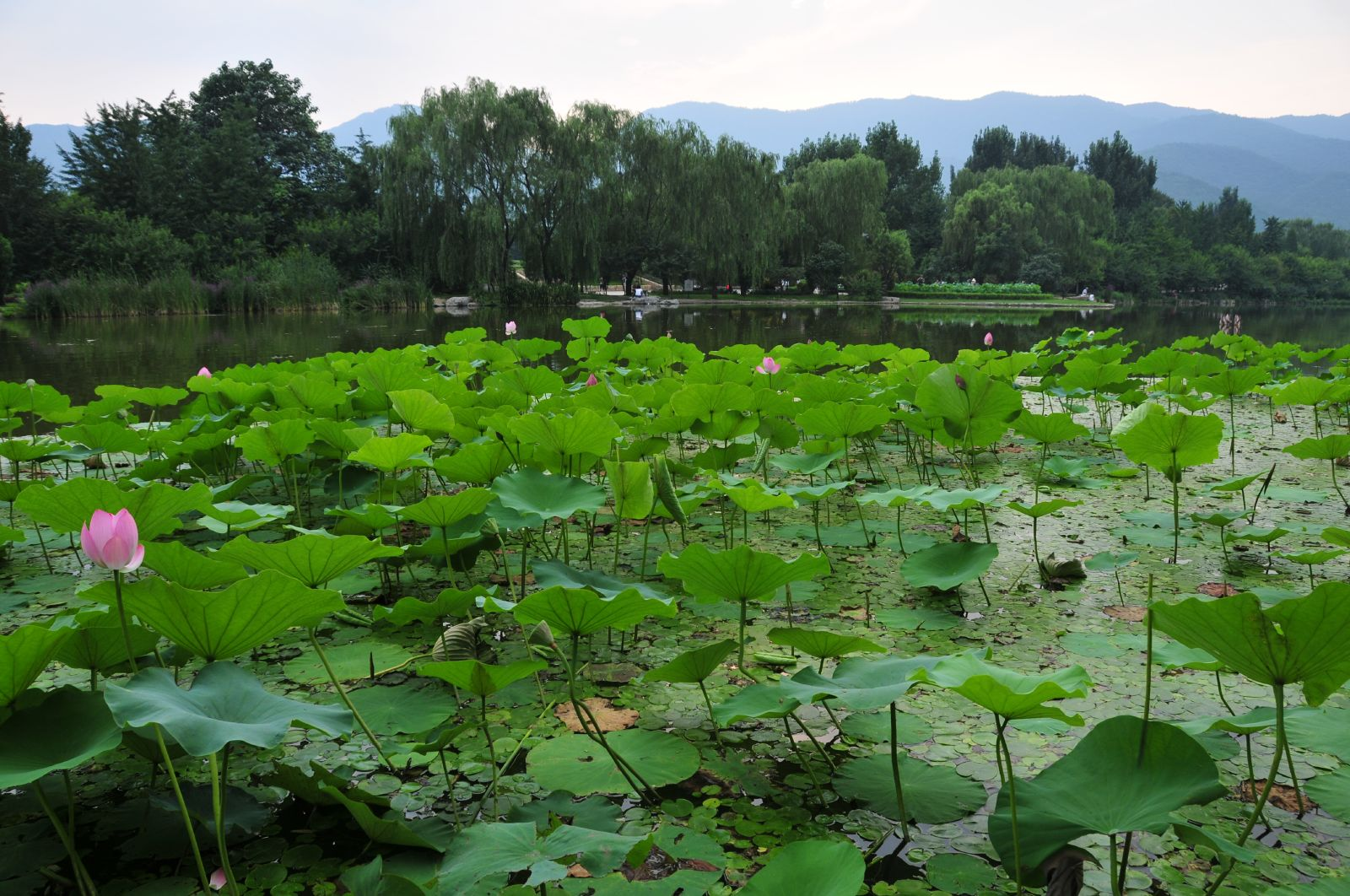
The Western Hills visible from the Beijing Botanical Garden

The Western Hills (Chinese: 西山; pinyin: Xīshān) are the hills and mountains in the western part of Beijing.

== Geography ==
Being an extension of the Taihang mountain range from the Hebei Province, the Western Hills cover approximately 17% of the Beijing municipality, including most of the Mentougou and Fangshan Districts as well as parts of Changping, Haidian, and Shijingshan. The elevation of the Western Hills range is between 100 m to over 1900 m above sea level and is visible from the city on clear days. A mix of deciduous and coniferous forests and highland meadows cover much of the Western Hills. Mountain streams feed into the Yongding and Juma Rivers, which flow through the Western Hills to irrigate the plains of Beijing. Coal is mined in Fangshan and Mentougou Districts. Natural and historical points of interest include river gorges, and hot springs, as well as temples, historic homes, secluded retreats and ancient ruins.

Also known as the Western Hills Scenic Area, the area has long been used as a retreat by Chinese scholars, religious men, and members of the government and civil service. Nearest to Beijing's Haidian District is the Fragrant Hills Park. Nearby is the Beijing Botanical Garden and Temple of Azure Clouds. The Wofo Temple, which has a giant reclining Buddha statue, is located on the grounds of the botanical gardens. To the northwest of the Fragrant Hills Park are Jiufeng (Vulture Peak) Forest Park (鹫峰森林公园), Dajue Temple, and Fenghuanling (Phoenix Ridge) Scenic Area.

South of the Fragrant Hills Park is Badachu (八大处; literally "eight great sites") in Shijingshan District, which is named after eight Buddhist temples and monasteries. The Western Hills of Shijinghan are also home to the Laoshan Mountain Bike Course, where the mountain biking competition of the 2008 Summer Olympic Games was held.

Fossils of the Peking Man were discovered in the caves of Dragon Bone Hill near Zhoukoudian in Fangshan District.

The Western Hills also houses an underground command center of the Chinese military, a secret bunker-like underground facility built with the assistance of the USSR in the 1950s, which now serves a purpose similar to the United States Military's Pentagon.

Mao Zedong briefly lived in the Western Hills, and the Politburo of the Chinese Communist Party retreated there briefly in 1989.

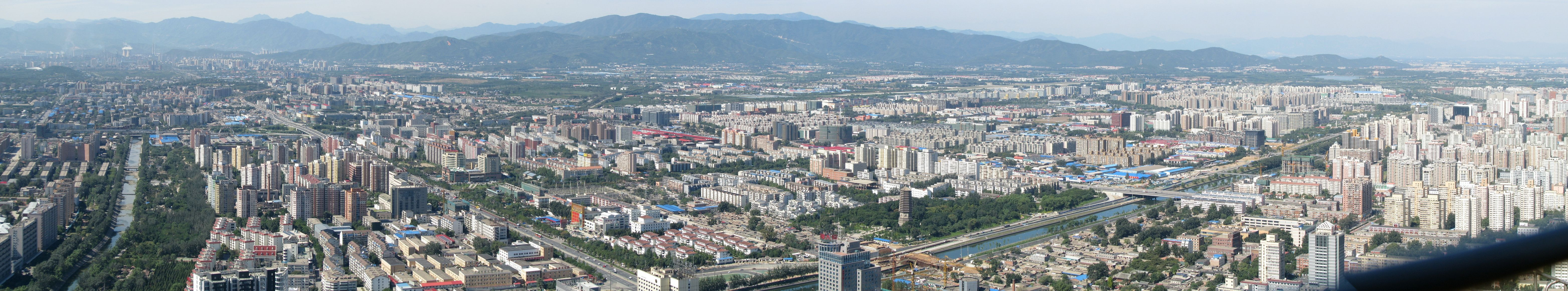
Far western Beijing from the CCTV Tower, with the Western Hills in the distance and the Summer Palace visible at the far right.

== Western Hills Group ==
The Kuomintang (KMT) also had a secret group named Western Hills, established in 1925. Revolutionary Sun Yat-sen's coffin was kept there, with the group's members being Buddhist, believing that the presence of Sun Yat-sen's body could bless them.

The group had a political goal of ousting the Communist Left, headed by Mikhail Borodin, from the KMT.

== See also ==
- Geography of Beijing
- 10 spirits from Western Hills (西山十戾) Taoism stories
- Xishan Society
