= Dayu Subdistrict, Beijing =

Dayu Subdistrict 大峪街道
- Subdistrict
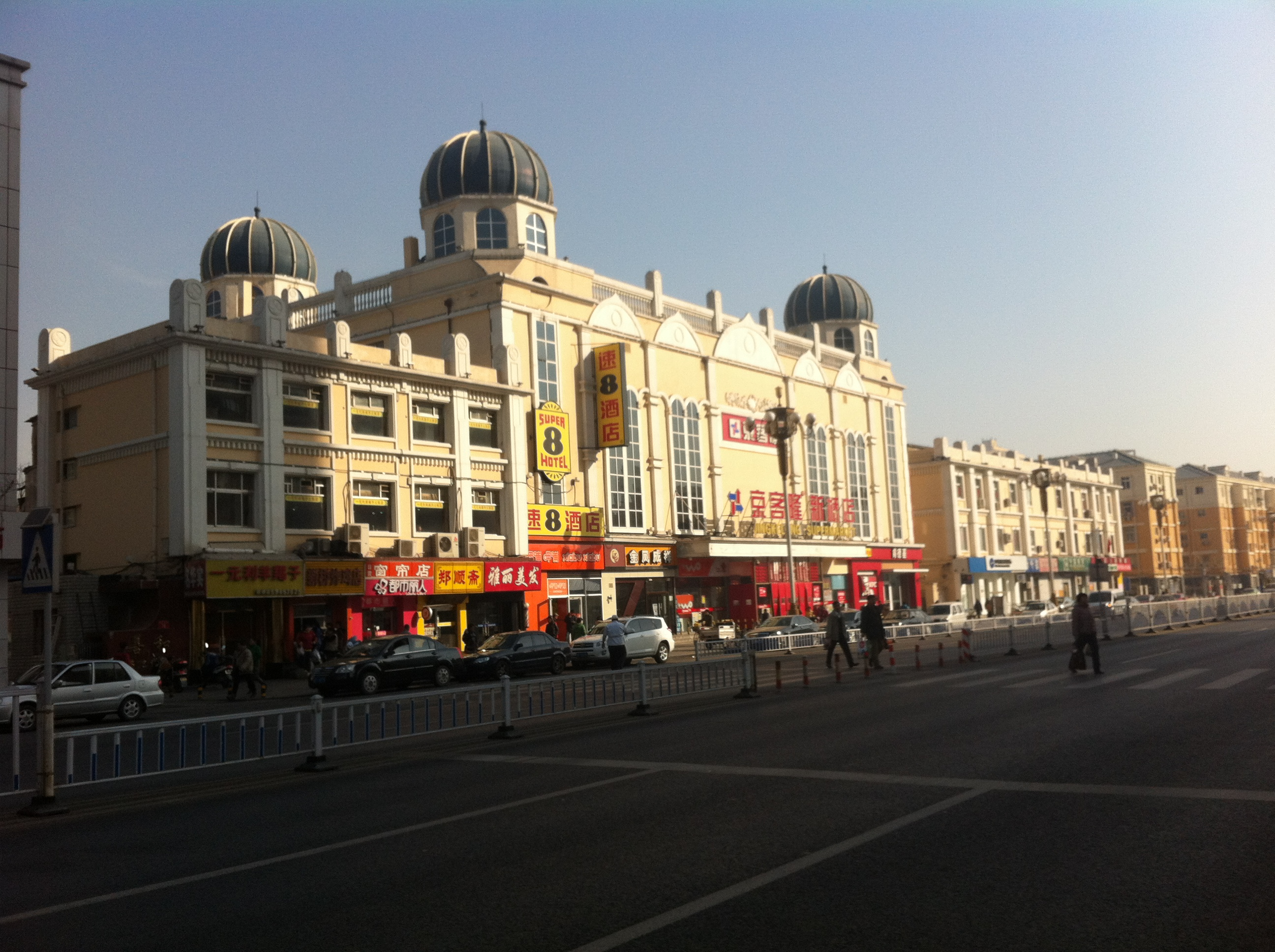
- Xinqiao Street inside of the subdistrict, 2015

- Location within Beijing Location within China
- Coordinates: 39°56′23″N 116°05′21″E
- Country: China
- Municipality: Beijing
- District: Mentougou
- Village-level Divisions: 33 communities

Area
  - Total: 4.58 km^{2} (1.77 sq mi)

Population (2020)
  - Total: 87,097
  - Density: 19,000/km^{2} (49,300/sq mi)
- Time zone: UTC+8 (China Standard)
- Postal code: 102308
- Area code: 010

Dayu Subdistrict (Chinese: 大峪街道; pinyin: Dàyù Jiēdào) is a subdistrict within Mentougou District, Beijing, China. It shares border with Chengzi Subdistrict and Longquan Town in the north, Guangning Subdistrict in the east, Yongding and Longquan Towns in the south, and Dongxinfang Subdistrict in the west. As of 2020, it had a census population of 87,097.

The name Dayu (Chinese: 大峪; lit. 'Big Ravine') was inherited from a village that used to exist in the region.

== History ==
Timeline of Dayu Subdistrict
Year	Status
1949	Dayu village, part of Jingxi Mining District
1957	Dayu Subdistrict was formed
1969	Converted to Menchengzhen Management District, and had the following revolutionary committees underneath: Dayu; Quanmen; Dongxindian; Sanjiadian
1971	Converted to Dayu Subdistrict Revolutionary Committee
1981	Reverted to a subdistrict

== Administrative Divisions ==
In the year 2021, Dayu Subdistrict consisted of 33 communities:

Administrative division code	Subdivision names	Name transliteration
110109001001	德露苑	Deluyuan
110109001002	月季园东里	Yuejiyuan Dongli
110109001003	月季园一区	Yuejiyuan Yiqu
110109001004	月季园二区	Yuejiyuan Erqu
110109001005	新桥南大街	Xinqiaonan Dajie
110109001007	双峪	Shunagyu
110109001008	向阳	Xiangyang
110109001010	向阳东里	Xiangyang Dongli
110109001011	龙泉花园	Longquan Huayuan
110109001012	剧场东街	Juchang Dongjie
110109001014	增产路	Zengchanglu
110109001024	新自建	Xinzijian
110109001027	南路一	Nanluyi
110109001028	南路二	Nanlu'er
110109001030	峪园	Yuyuan
110109001032	永新	Yongxin
110109001033	桃园	Taoyuan
110109001034	增产路东区	Zengchanglu Dongqu
110109001037	新桥	Xinqiao
110109001038	新桥西区	Xinqiao Xiqu
110109001051	承泽苑	Chengzeyuan
110109001052	中门花园	Zhongmen Huayuan
110109001053	绿岛家园	Lüdaio Jiayuan
110109001054	绮霞苑	Qixiayuan
110109001055	滨河西区	Binhe Xiqu
110109001056	葡东	Pudong
110109001057	临镜苑	Linjingyuan
110109001058	惠民家园	Huimin Jiayuan
110109001059	龙山三区	Longshan Sanqu
110109001060	龙山一区	Longshan Yiqu
110109001061	龙山二区	Longshan Erqu
110109001062	丽湾西园	Liwan Xiyuan
110109001063	龙坡	Longpo

== See also ==
- List of township-level divisions of Beijing
