= Datai Subdistrict =

Datai Subdistrict 大台街道
- Subdistrict
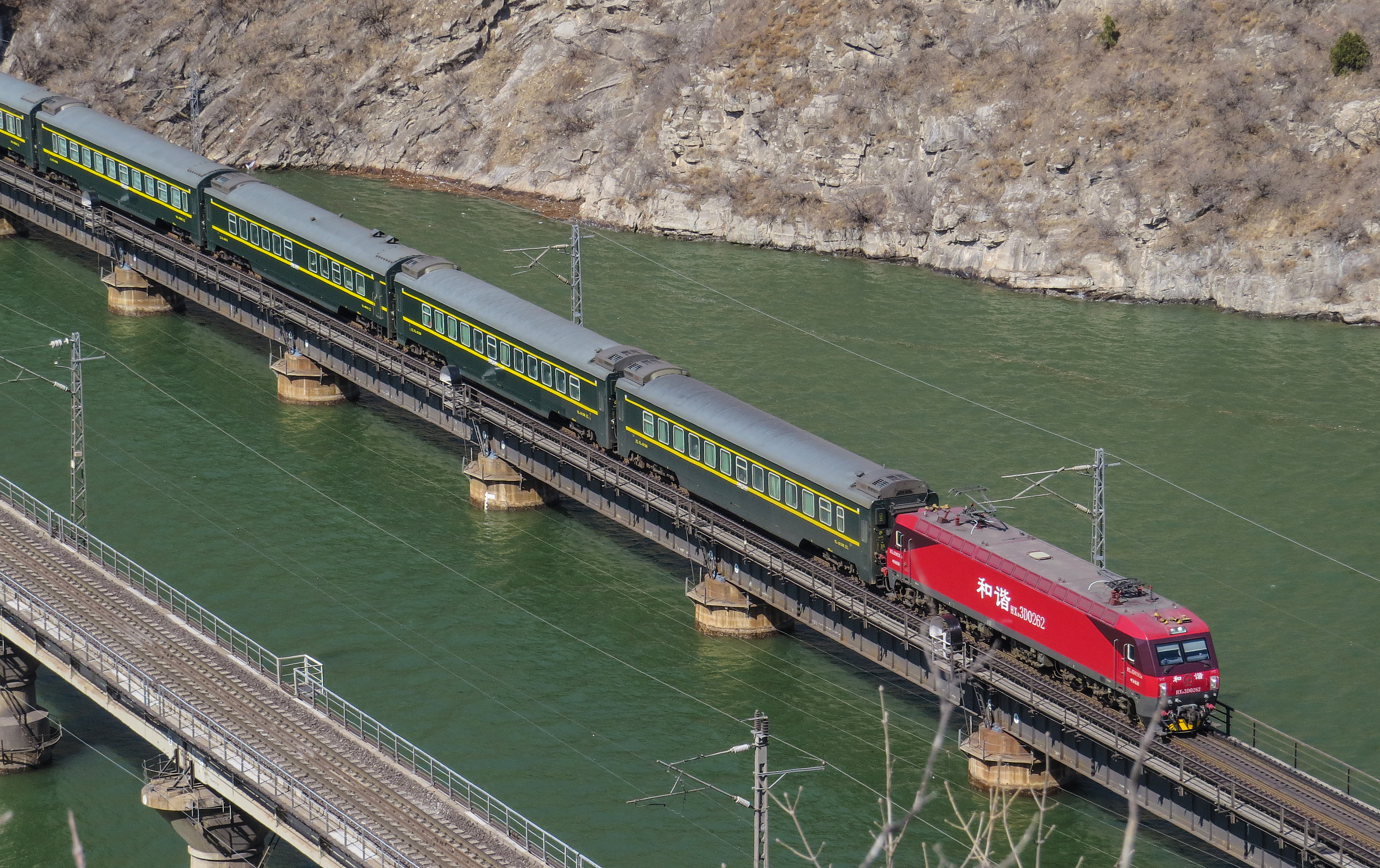
- Lupoling Railway Station within the subdistrict, 2017

- Location within Beijing Location within China
- Coordinates: 39°57′51″N 115°56′07″E
- Country: China
- Municipality: Beijing
- District: Mentougou
- Village-level Divisions: 9 communities

Area
  - Total: 79.38 km^{2} (30.65 sq mi)

Population (2020)
  - Total: 3,728
  - Density: 46.96/km^{2} (121.6/sq mi)
- Time zone: UTC+8 (China Standard)
- Postal code: 102301
- Area code: 010

Datai Subdistrict (Chinese: 大台街道; pinyin: Dàtái Jiēdào) is a subdistrict of central Mentougou District, Beijing, China. It borders Yanchi and Wanping Towns in the north, Wanping and Yongding Towns in the east, Fozizhuang and Da'anshan Towns in the south, and Zhaitang Town in the west. In the year 2020, the population for this subdistrict was 3,728.

== History ==
History of Datai Subdistrict
Year	Status
1949	Part of the 3rd District, Wanping County, Hebei
1955	Datai Rural Bureau was established
1958	Reformed into Datai People's Commune
1973	Reformed into a subdistrict

== Administrative divisions ==
In the year 2021, Datai Subdistrict comprised nine communities:

Administrative division code	Subdivision names	Name transliteration
110109004001	落坡岭	Luopoling
110109004003	桃园	Taoyuan
110109004004	双红	Shuanghong
110109004005	大台	Datai
110109004006	黄土台	Huangtutai
110109004007	灰地	Huidi
110109004009	玉皇庙	Yuhuangmiao
110109004010	木城涧	Muchengjian
110109004011	千军台	Qianjuntai

== See also ==
- List of township-level divisions of Beijing
