= Lugu Subdistrict, Beijing =

Lugu Subdistrict 鲁谷街道
- Subdistrict
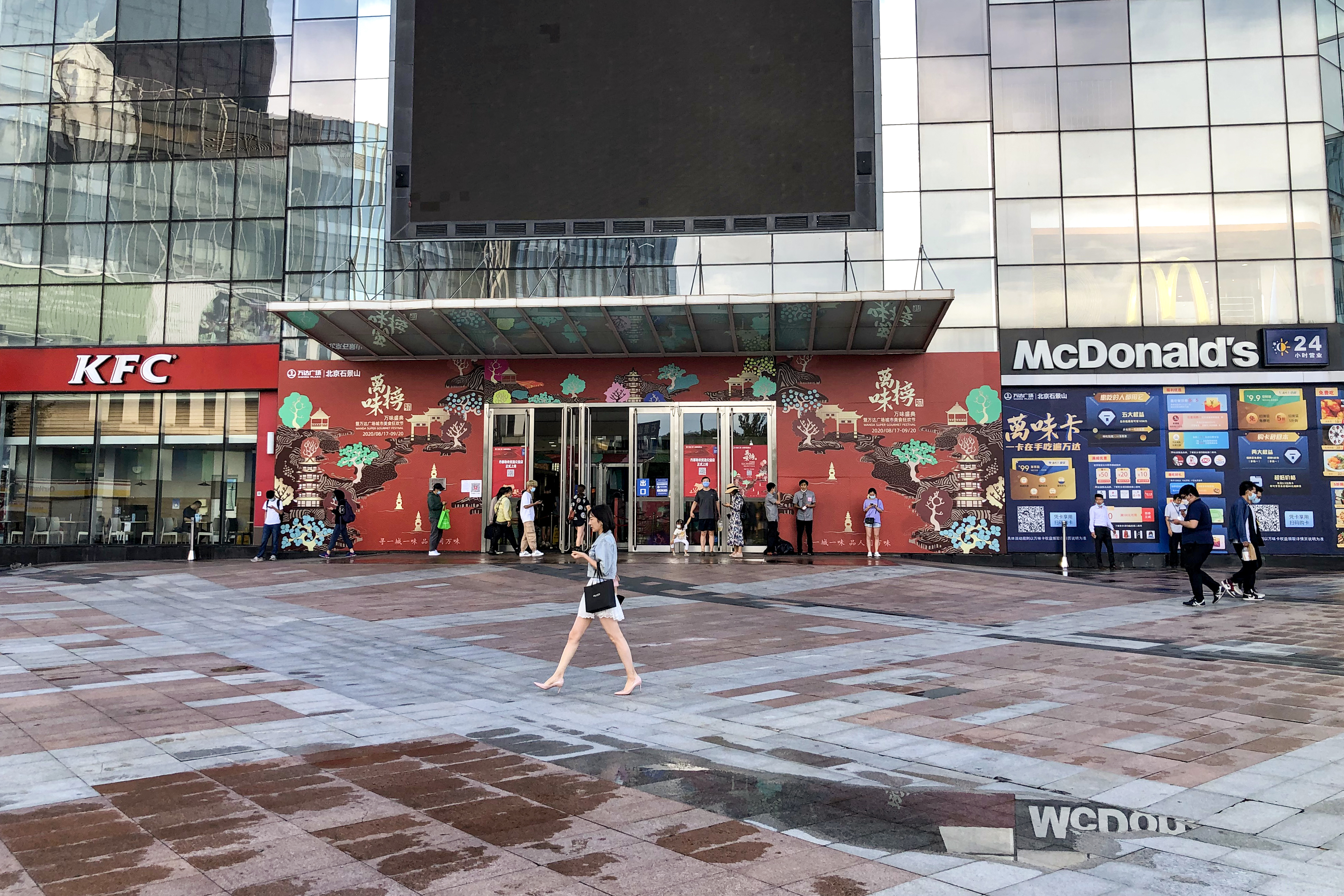
- Beijing Shijingshan Wanda Plaza on northeast of the subdistrict, 2020

- Location within Beijing Location within China
- Coordinates: 39°53′46″N 116°13′09″E
- Country: China
- Municipality: Beijing
- District: Shijingshan
- Village-level Divisions: 22 communities

Area
  - Total: 5.57 km^{2} (2.15 sq mi)

Population (2020)
  - Total: 66,794
  - Density: 12,000/km^{2} (31,100/sq mi)
- Time zone: UTC+8 (China Standard)
- Postal code: 100040
- Area code: 010

Lugu Subdistrict (Chinese: 鲁谷街道; pinyin: Lǔgǔ Jiēdào) is a subdistrict located in southern Shijingshan District, Beijing, China. It is bordering Laoshan Subdistrict in the north, Babaoshan Subdistrict in the east, Fengtai District in the south, Gucheng and Bajiao Subdistricts in the west. In the year 2020, the subdistrict had a total of 66,794 people residing within it.

The name Lugu (Chinese: 鲁谷; lit. 'Lu Valley') came from a village that used to exist in the area. the subdistrict was formed in 2001.

== Administrative Divisions ==
Lugu subdistrict was made up of 22 communities as of the year 2021:

Administrative division code	Subdivision names	Name transliteration
110107011001	双锦园	Shuanghjinyuan
110107011002	永乐西北	Yongle Xibei
110107011003	永乐西南	Yongle Xinan
110107011006	久筑	Yongzhu
110107011007	五芳园	Wufangyuan
110107011008	重聚园	Chongjuyuan
110107011009	依翠园北	Yicuiyuan Bei
110107011010	依翠园南	Yicuiyuan Nan
110107011011	六合园北	Liuheyuan Bei
110107011012	六合园南	Liuheyuan Nan
110107011014	新华社	Xinhuashe
110107011015	七星园北	Qixingyuan Bei
110107011016	七星园南	Qixingyuan Nan
110107011018	衙门口东	Yamenkou Dong
110107011019	衙门口西	Yamenkou Xi
110107011020	衙门口南	Yamenkou Nan
110107011021	新岚大厦	Xingang Dasha
110107011022	重兴园	Chongxingyuan
110107011023	聚兴园	Juxingyuan
110107011024	碣石坪	Jieshiping
110107011025	西厂	Xichang
110107011026	京汉旭城	Jinghan Xucheng

== See also ==
- List of township-level divisions of Beijing
