= Pingguoyuan Subdistrict, Beijing =

Pingguoyuan Subdistrict 苹果园街道
- Subdistrict
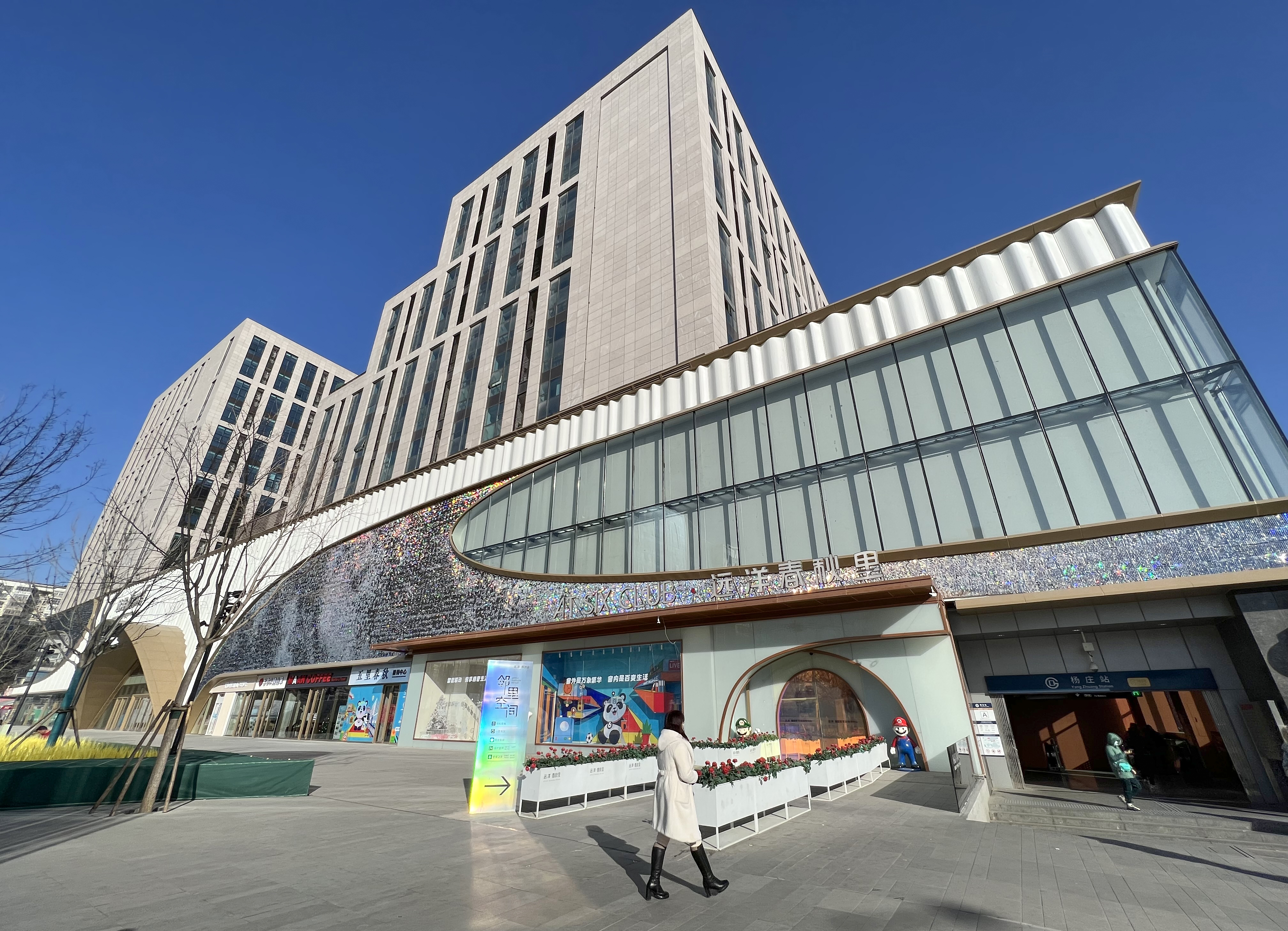
- Apple Garden No. Six over Yangzhuang station in the subdistrict, 2021

- Location within Beijing Location within China
- Coordinates: 39°55′39″N 116°10′46″E
- Country: China
- Municipality: Beijing
- District: Shijingshan
- Village-level Divisions: 21 communities

Area
  - Total: 13.8 km^{2} (5.3 sq mi)

Population (2020)
  - Total: 97,543
  - Density: 7,070/km^{2} (18,300/sq mi)
- Time zone: UTC+8 (China Standard)
- Postal code: 100043
- Area code: 010

Pingguoyuan Subdistrict (Chinese: 苹果园街道; pinyin: Píngguǒyuán Jiēdào) is a subdistrict on the center of Shijingshan District, Beijing, China. It borders Sijiqing Township in its northeast, Bajiao and Gucheng Subdistricts in its south, as well as Jindingjie and Wulituo Subdistricts in its west. It is home to 97,543 residents as of 2020.

The subdistrict was named Pingguoyuan (Chinese: 苹果园; lit. 'Apple Orchard') for an orchard that used to exist in the area in Ming Dynasty.

== History ==
Pingguoyuan Subdistrict was first organized in 1954. In 1958 it was changed to a production team, and changed back to a subdistrict in 1963.

== Administrative Divisions ==
In the year 2021, Pingguoyuan Subdistrict oversaw the following 15 communities:

Administrative division code	Subdivision names	Name transliteration
110107005003	西黄村	Xihuangcun
110107005007	下庄	Xiazhuang
110107005009	八大处	Badachu
110107005013	西井	Xijing
110107005015	海特花园第三	Haite Huayuan Disan
110107005019	苹一	Pingyi
110107005021	边府	Bianfu
110107005022	琅山村	Langshancun
110107005025	苹三	Pingsan
110107005028	苹二	Ping'er
110107005029	苹四	Pingsi
110107005031	军区装备部大院	Junqu Zhuangbeibu Dayuan
110107005032	海特花园第一	Haite Huayuan Diyi
110107005033	海特花园第二	Haite Huayuan Di'er
110107005034	西黄新村	Xihuang Xincun
110107005035	西山枫林第一	Xishan Fenglin Diyi
110107005036	军区大院第一	Junqu Dayuan Diyi
110107005038	西山枫林第二	Xishan Fenglin Di'er
110107005039	西黄新村东里	Xihuang Xincun Dongli
110107005040	西黄新村西里	Xihuang Xincun Xili
110107005041	东下庄	Dongxiacun

== See also ==
- List of township-level divisions of Beijing
