= Babaoshan =

Babaoshan is an atonal pinyin romanization of various Chinese places.

It may refer to:

- Babao Mountains in Gansu, China
- Babaoshan Subdistrict in Shijingshan Subdistrict in Beijing, China
- Babaoshan Revolutionary Cemetery, in Beijing
- Babaoshan Station on the Beijing Subway's Line 1
