= Gucheng station =

Beijing Subway station

Gucheng 古城
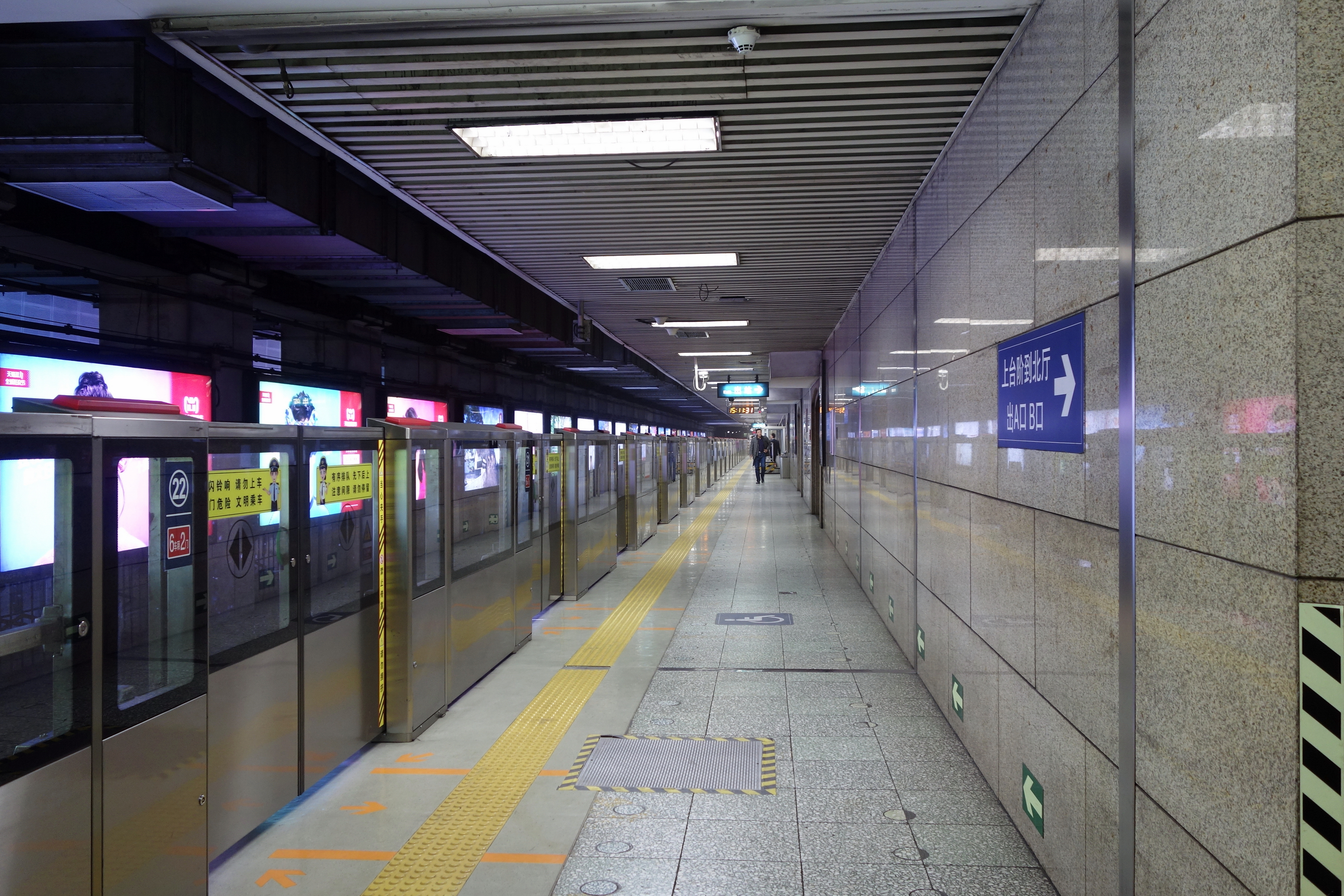
- Platform

General information
- Location: Shijingshan Road; Gucheng Subdistrict, Shijingshan District, Beijing; China
- Coordinates: 39°54′27″N 116°11′25″E
- Operator: Beijing Mass Transit Railway Operation Corporation Limited
- Line: Line 1
- Platforms: 2 (2 side platforms)
- Tracks: 2

Construction
- Structure type: Underground
- Accessible: Yes

Other information
- Station code: 104

History
- Opened: November 7, 1971

Services
Preceding station	Beijing Subway	Following station
Pingguoyuan Terminus	Line 1	Babaoshan towards Universal Resort
Location
- Location within Beijing

Gucheng station (Chinese: 古城站; pinyin: Gǔchéng zhàn) is a station on Line 1 of the Beijing Subway. It is located in Gucheng Subdistrict, Shijingshan District, Beijing. It opened on November 7, 1971.

It previously served as the current terminus of the line from April 18, 2020, to February 14, 2026 due to station renovations at Pingguoyuan. Between February 15 and May 15, 2026, due to facilitation works on Line 1 Branch at Bajiao Amusement Park, the station is closed along with Babaoshan station, making Yuquan Lu the temporary western terminus of the line. The station reopened on May 16, 2026, along with Pingguoyuan station, which ended this station's status as a terminus station for the line.

The station used to be known as Guchenglu Station.

== Station layout ==
The station has two side platforms.

== Exits ==
There are four exits: lettered A, B, C, and D. Exit D is accessible.

== Gallery ==
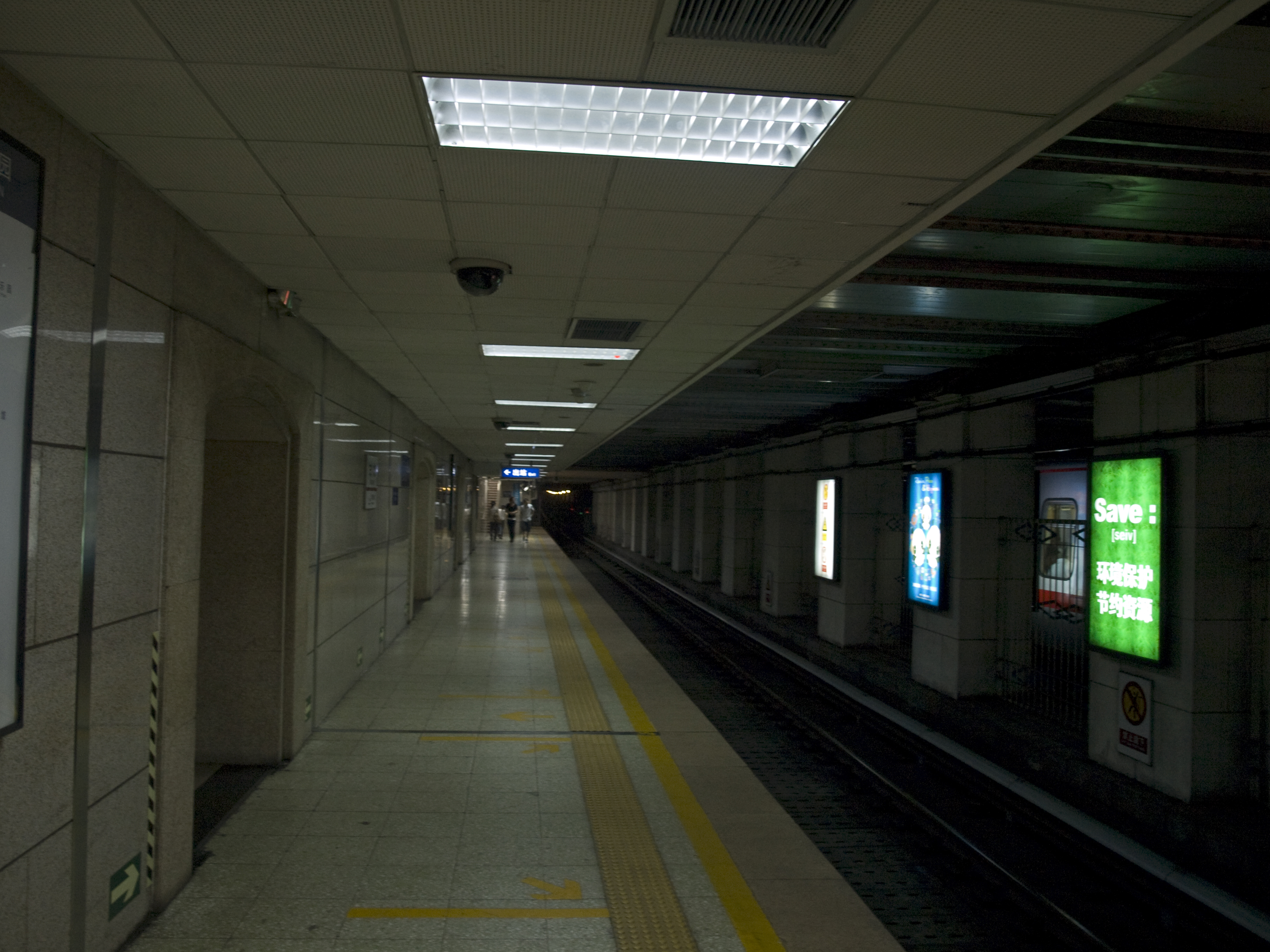
Platform of Gucheng station in 2010, before the safety door was installed

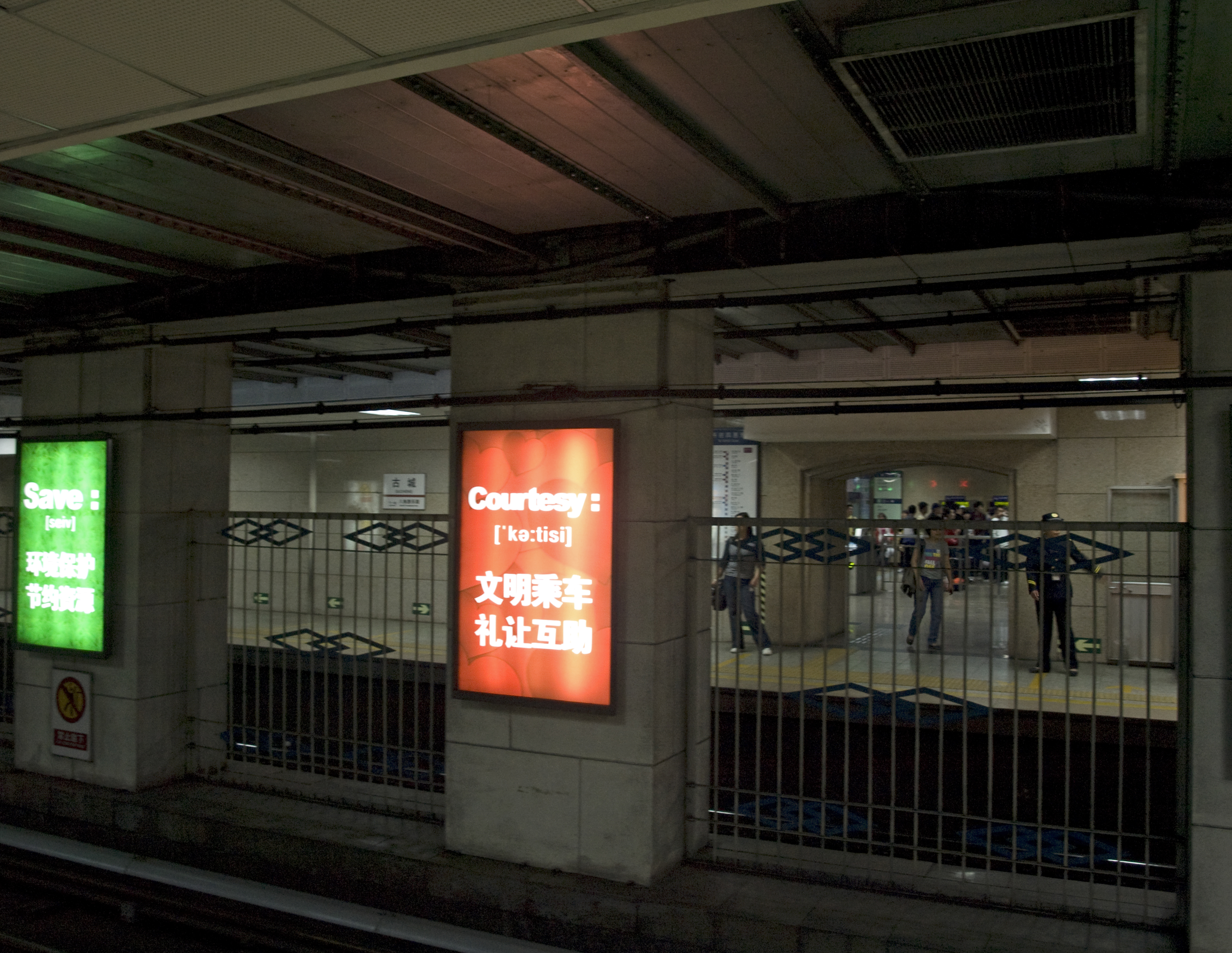
The platform in Gucheng station in 2010

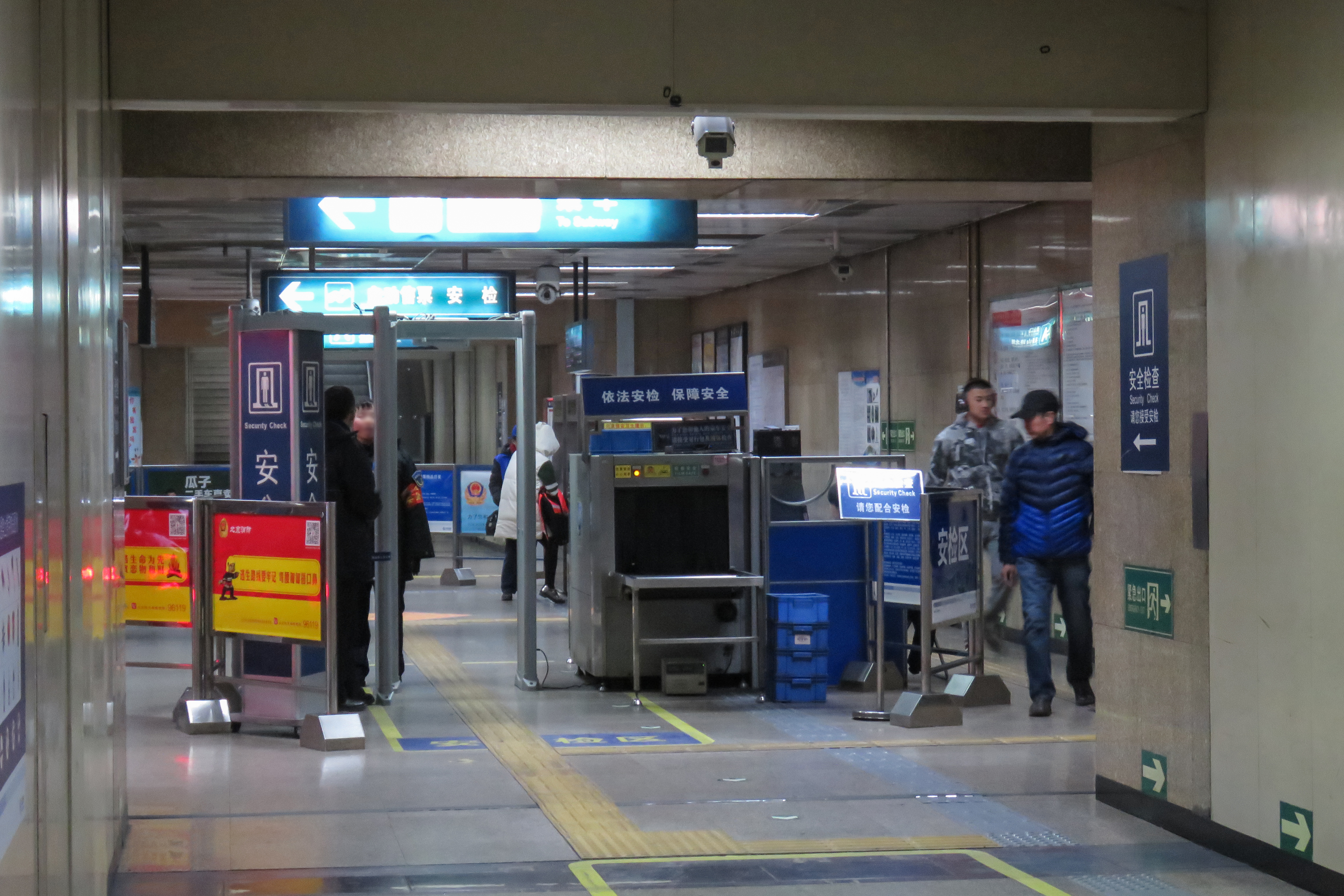
Security check at Station Hall
