= Bajiao Amusement Park =

Bajiao Amusement Park may refer to:

- Beijing Shijingshan Amusement Park, also known as Bajiao Amusement Park, in Beijing, China
- Bajiao Amusement Park Station, station at Line 1, Beijing Subway
