= Yuquan Lu station =

Beijing Subway Line 1 station

Yuquan Lu 玉泉路
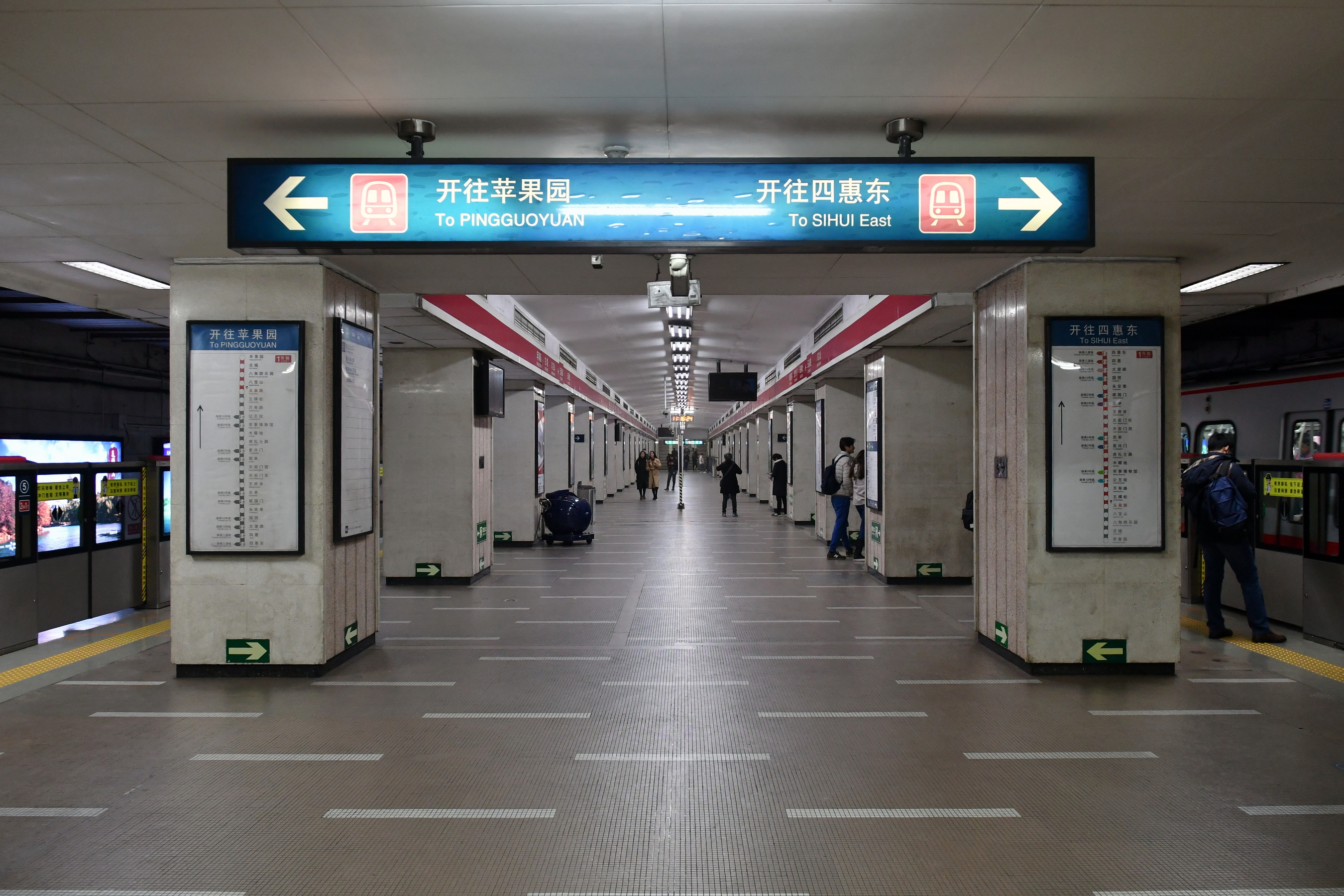
- Platform

General information
- Location: Fuxing Road and Yuquan Road border of Shijingshan District and Haidian District, Beijing; China
- Coordinates: 39°54′27″N 116°15′10″E
- Operator: Beijing Mass Transit Railway Operation Corporation Limited
- Line: Line 1
- Platforms: 2 (1 island platform)
- Tracks: 2

Construction
- Structure type: Underground
- Accessible: Yes

Other information
- Station code: 107

History
- Opened: August 5, 1971; 55 years ago

Services
| Preceding station | Beijing Subway | Following station |
|---|---|---|
| Babaoshan towards Pingguoyuan | Line 1 | Wukesong towards Universal Resort |
Location
- Location within Beijing

Yuquan Lu Station (Chinese: 玉泉路站; pinyin: Yùquán Lù Zhàn) is a station on Line 1 of the Beijing Subway.

Between February 15 and May 16, 2026, due to facilitation works on Line 1 Branch at Bajiao Amusement Park making Gucheng and Babaoshan stations unoperational, the station was the temporary western terminus of the line.

== Station layout ==
The station has an underground island platform.

== Exits ==
The station has eight exits, lettered A1, A2, B1, B2, C1, C2, D1, and D2. Exit A1 is accessible.

== Gallery ==
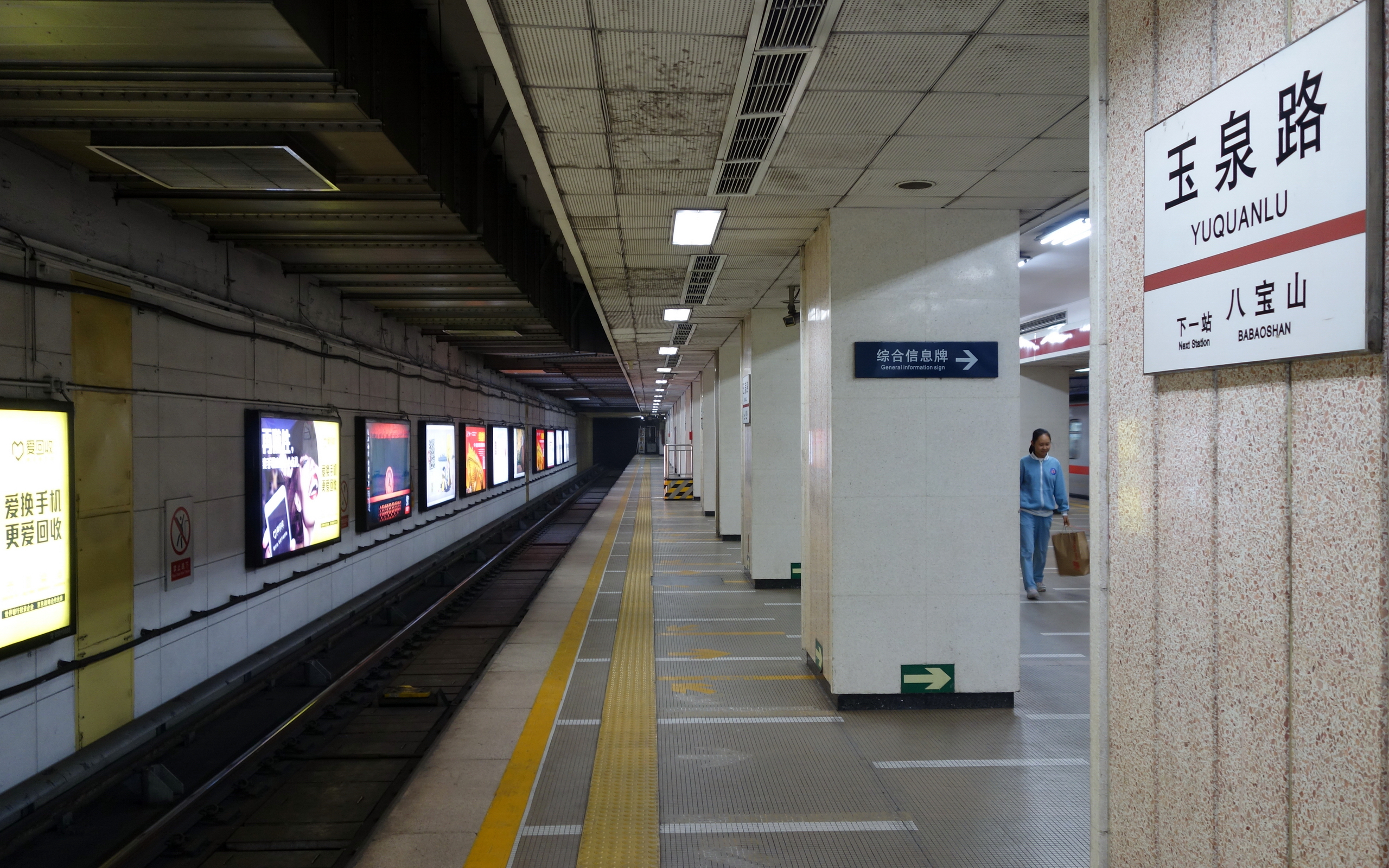
Platform, before the safety door was installed

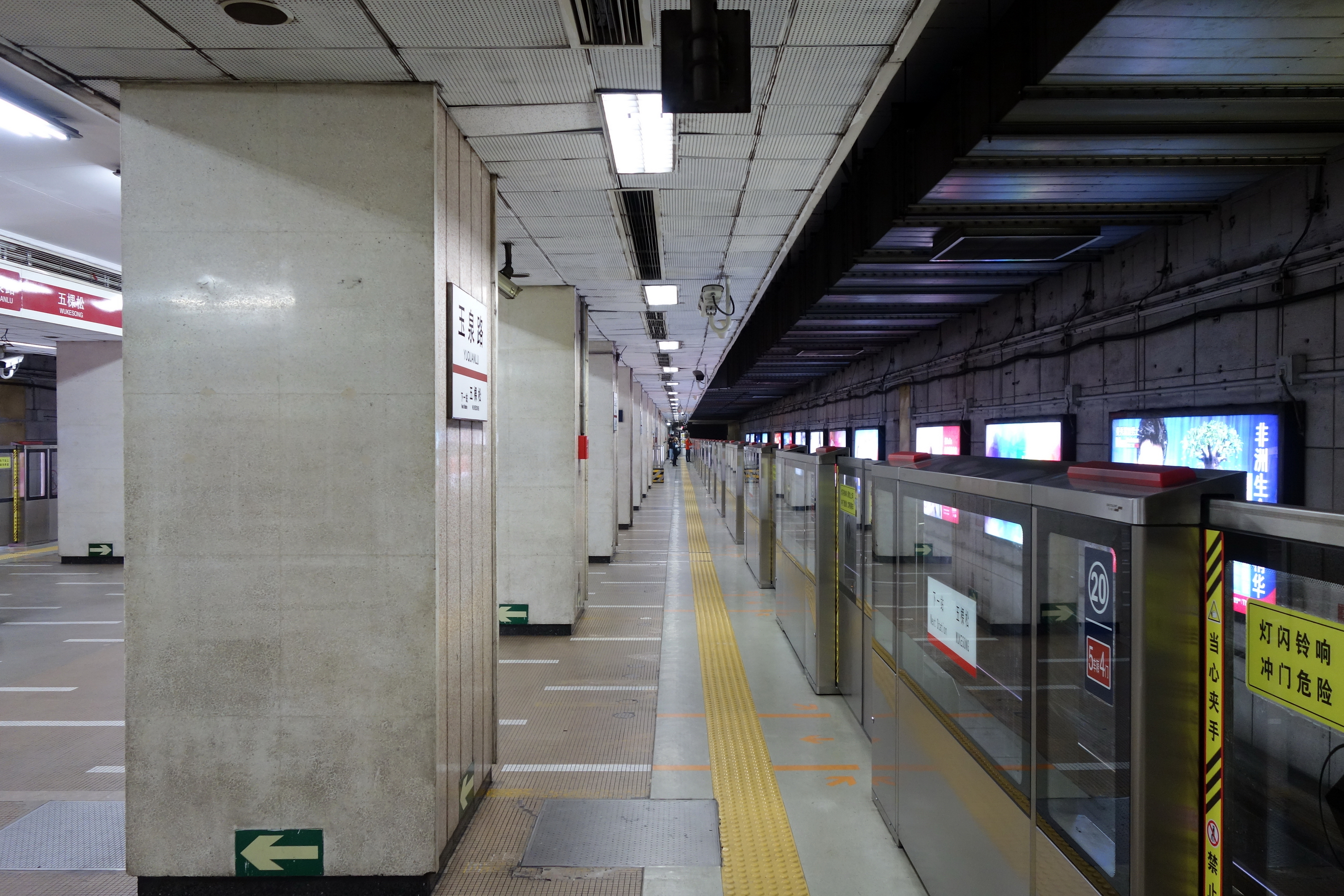
In 2017, Safety door was installed on the platform

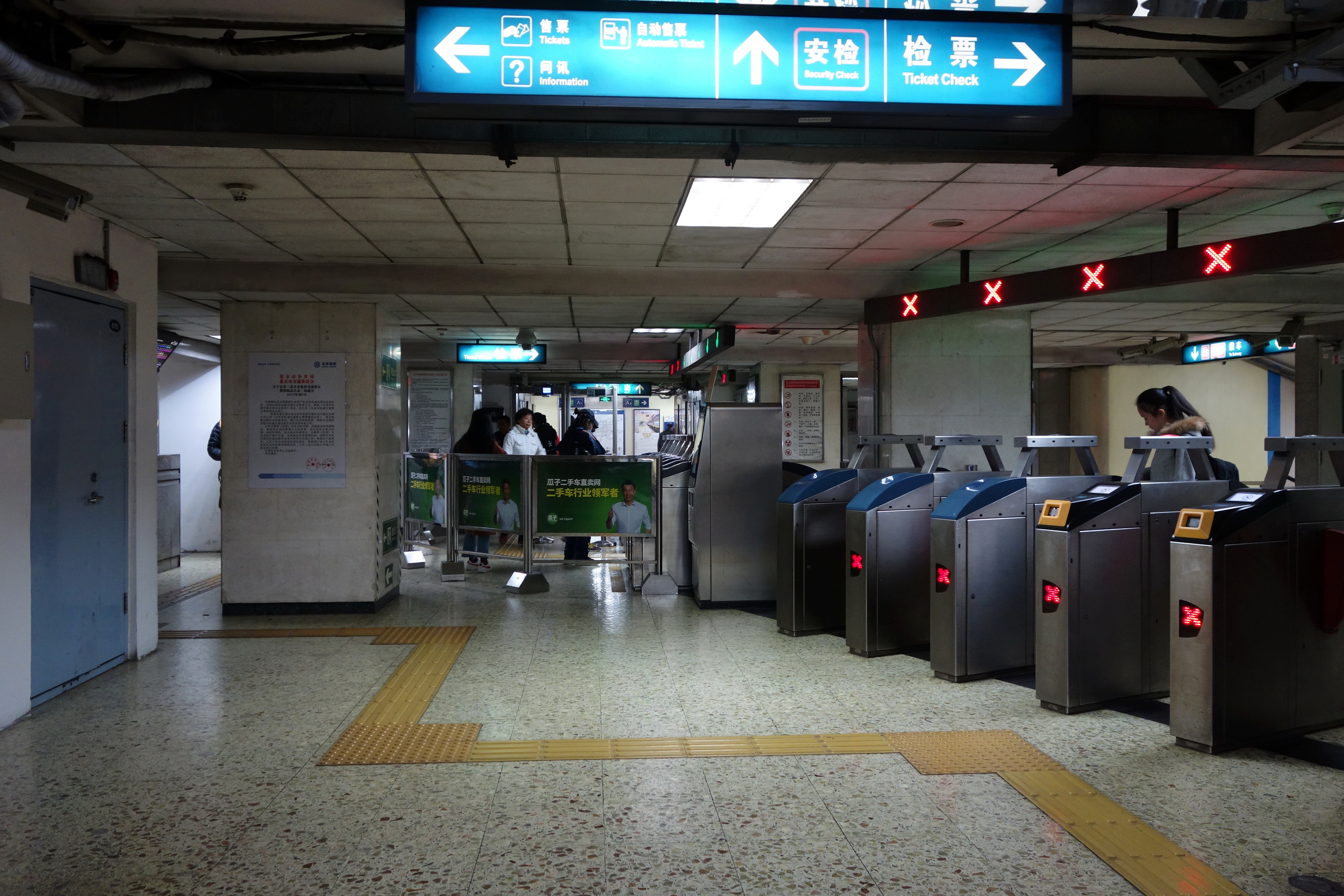
Station Hall
