= Xihuangcun station =

Beijing Subway station

Xihuangcun 西黄村
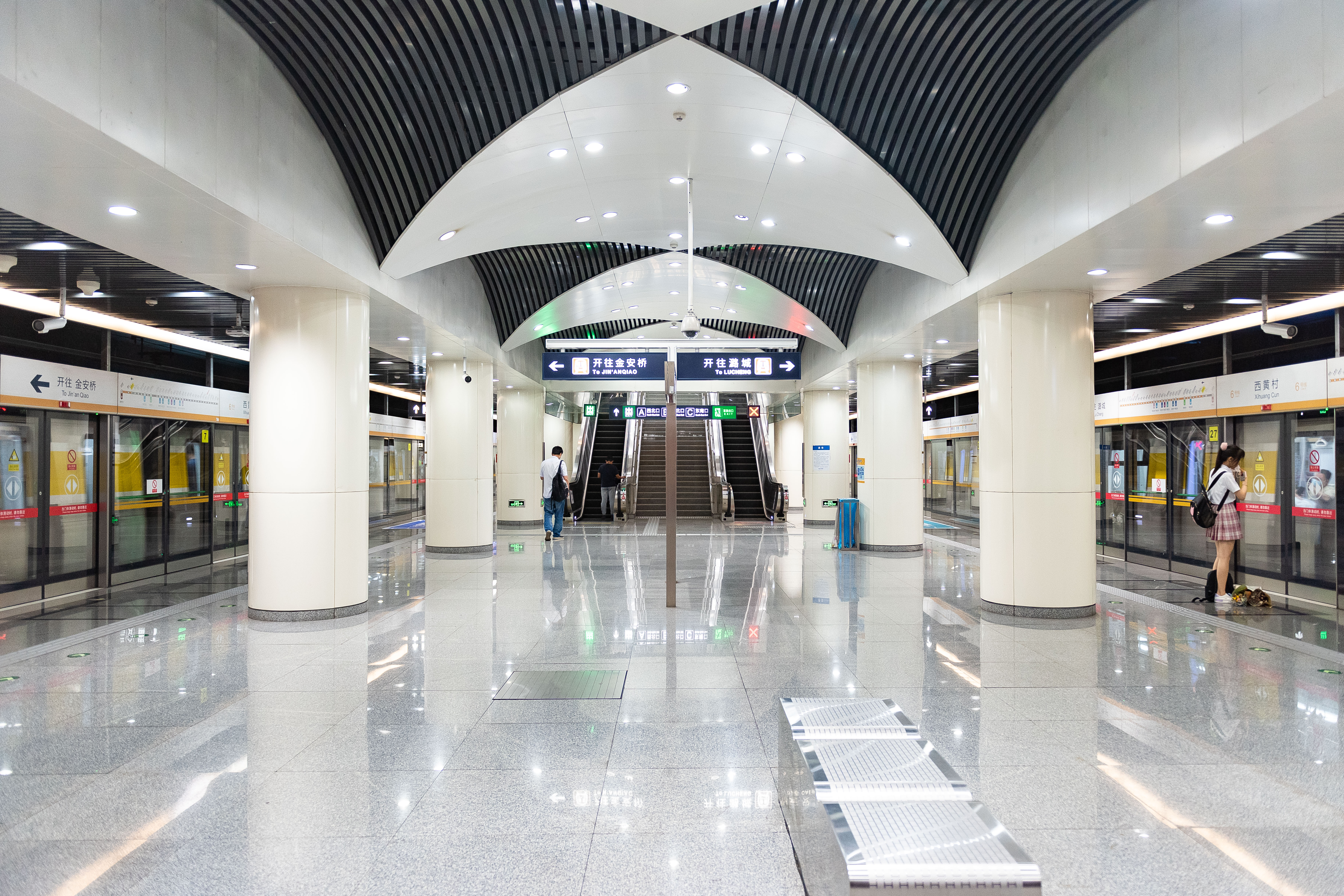
- Platform

General information
- Location: Pingguoyuan Subdistrict, Shijingshan District, Beijing; China
- Coordinates: 39.932502°N 116.200174°E
- Operator: Beijing Mass Transit Railway Operation Corporation Limited
- Line: Line 6
- Platforms: 2 (1 island platform)
- Tracks: 2

Construction
- Structure type: Underground
- Accessible: Yes

History
- Opened: December 30, 2018; 7 years ago

Services
Preceding station	Beijing Subway	Following station
Yangzhuang towards Jin'anqiao	Line 6	Liaogongzhuang towards Luyang
Location
- Location within Beijing

Xihuangcun station (Chinese: 西黄村站; pinyin: Xīhuáng Cūn zhàn) is a station on Line 6 of the Beijing Subway. The station is located at the intersection of Tiancun Road and North China University of Technology in Shijingshan District. It was opened on December 30, 2018.

== Station layout ==
The station has an underground island platform.

== Exits ==
There are 3 exits, lettered A, B, and C. Exits A and C are accessible.
