= Shijingshan, Beijing =

Shijingshan 石景山区
- District
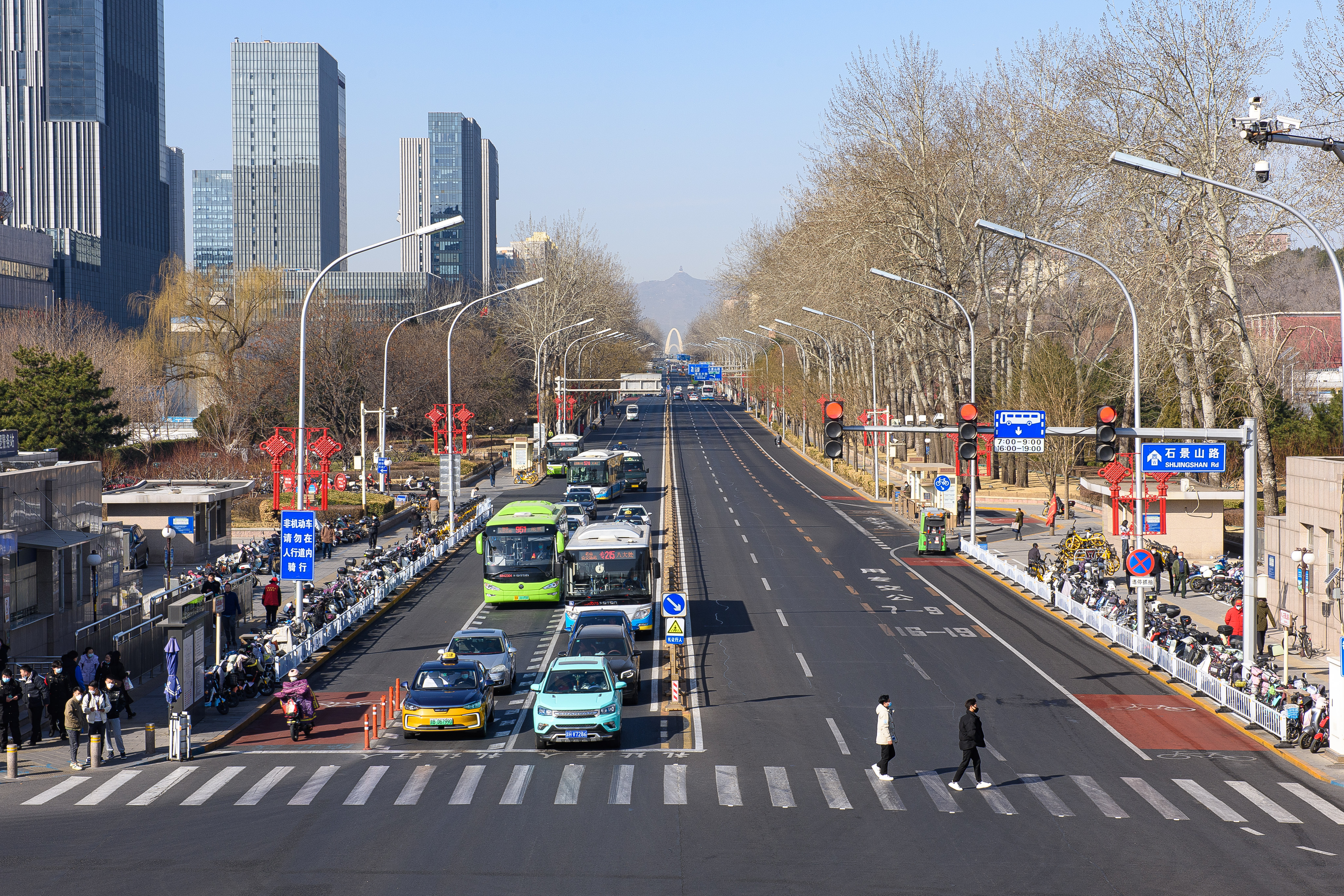
- Shijingshan Road

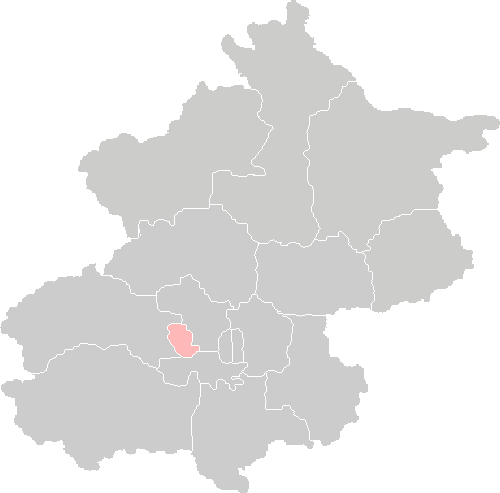
- Location of Shijingshan District in Beijing
- Coordinates: 39°54′23″N 116°13′23″E
- Country: People's Republic of China
- Municipality: Beijing
- Township-level divisions: 9 subdistricts

Area
  - Total: 86 km^{2} (33 sq mi)

Population (2010)
  - Total: 616,000
  - Density: 7,200/km^{2} (19,000/sq mi)
- Time zone: UTC+8 (China Standard)
- Postal code: 100043
- Area code: 0010

Shijingshan District (Chinese: 石景山区; pinyin: Shíjǐngshān Qū) is an urban district of the city of Beijing. It lies to the west of the urban core of Beijing, and is part of the Western Hills area, bordering the districts of Haidian to the northeast and east, Fengtai to the south, and Mentougou to the west. The district consists of 9 subdistricts of Beijing's city proper.

Although the hills around Yunju Temple may also be called Shijingshan, they have Chinese characters different from those of the district and hence are unrelated to Shijingshan District.

It is 86 square kilometres (33 sq mi) in area, making it one of the smaller districts in the greater urban part of Beijing (the immense Mentougou District to the west of it dwarfs Shijingshan District), and is home to 489,439 inhabitants (2000 Census). Its postal code is 100043.

== Administrative divisions ==
There are 9 subdistricts in the district:

Name	Chinese (S)	Hanyu Pinyin	Population (2010)	Area (km^{2})
Babaoshan Subdistrict	八宝山街道	Bābǎoshān Jiēdào	53,606	5.24
Laoshan Subdistrict	老山街道	Lǎoshān Jiēdào	42,606	6.21
Bajiao Subdistrict	八角街道	Bājiǎo Jiēdào	116,416	6.30
Gucheng Subdistrict	古城街道	Gǔchéng Jiēdào	59,783	15.41
Pingguoyuan Subdistrict	苹果园街道	Píngguǒyuán Jiēdào	101,775	13.80
Jindingjie Subdistrict	金顶街街道	Jīndǐngjiē Jiēdào	75,736	7.30
Guangning Subdistrict	广宁街道	Guǎngníng Jiēdào	17,395	6.11
Wulituo Subdistrict	五里坨街道	Wǔlǐtuó Jiēdào	30,462	26.94
Lugu Subdistrict	鲁谷街道	Lǔgǔ Jiēdào	95,455	5.57

== Transportation ==
The western stretch of the 5th Ring Road lies in this area. The Beijing subway serves this area. China National Highway 109 runs through Shijingshan.

=== Metro ===
Shijingshan District is currently served by 4 metro lines of the Beijing Subway system:

- Line 1 - Pingguoyuan, Gucheng, Bajiao Amusement Park, Babaoshan, Yuquanlu
- Line 6 - Jin'anqiao, Pingguoyuan, Yangzhuang, Xihuangcun
- Line 11 - Moshikou, Jin'anqiao, Beixin'an, Xinshougang (Shougang Park)
- Line S1 - Pingguoyuan, Jin'anqiao

== Important areas ==
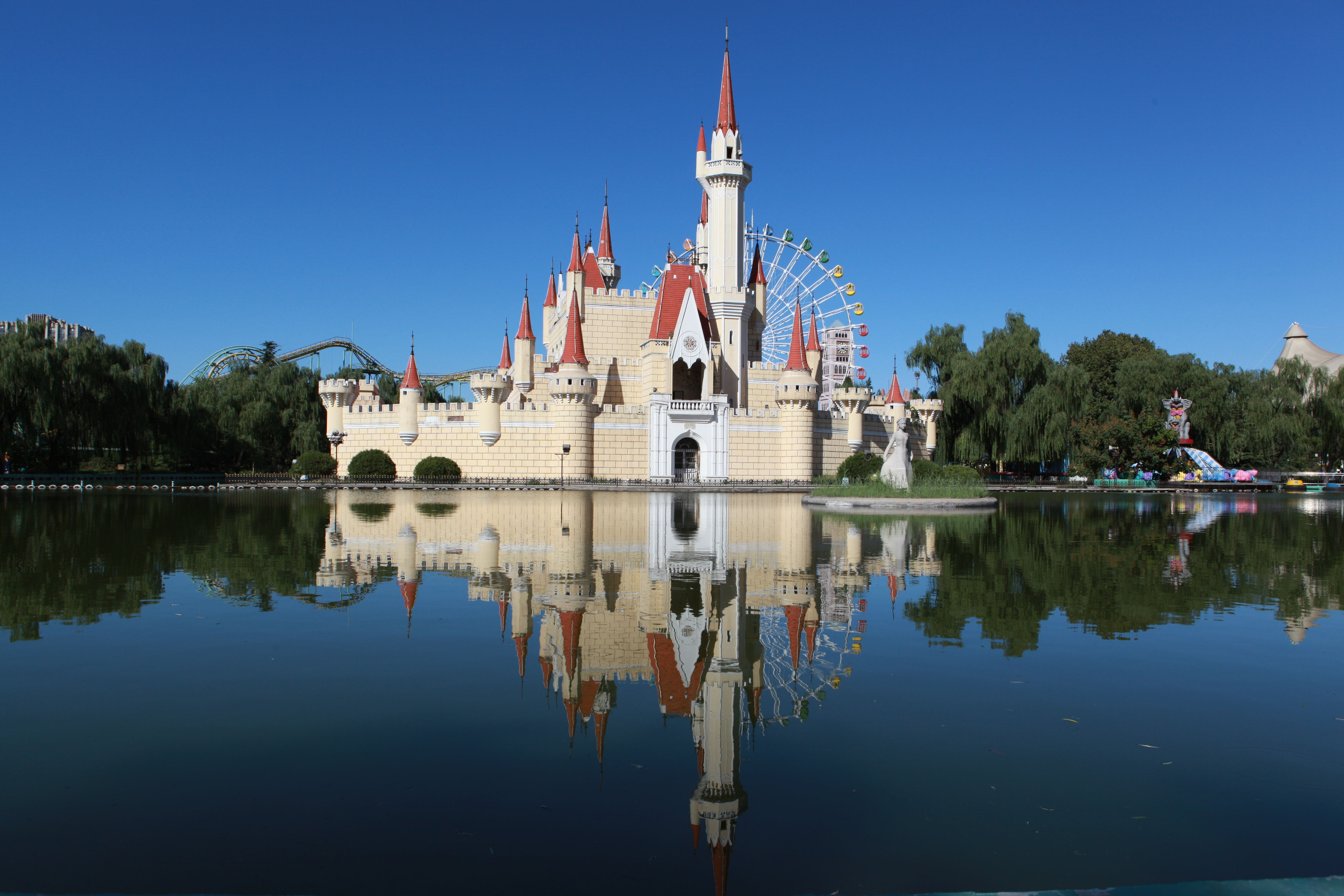
Beijing Shijingshan Amusement Park

- North China University of Technology
- Babaoshan Revolutionary Cemetery
- Shijingshan Amusement Park
- Shougang industrial complex
- Institute of High Energy Physics (IHEP), Chinese Academy of Sciences

== Economy ==
In 2017, the regional GDP of the district was 53.54 billion yuan, with GDP per capita at 87.5 thousand yuan.

== Sports ==
The district is the location of hosting the 2008 Summer Olympics BMX and track-cycling events at the location of the Laoshan Velodrome, as well as hosting the 2022 Winter Olympics Big Air snowboarding and freestyle skiing events at the Big Air Shougang.

== Climate ==
Shijingshan District has a humid continental climate (Köppen climate classification Dwa). The average annual temperature in Shijingshan is 13.2 °C (55.8 °F). The average annual rainfall is 565.9 mm (22.28 in) with July as the wettest month. The temperatures are highest on average in July, at around 27.0 °C (80.6 °F), and lowest in January, at around −2.7 °C (27.1 °F).

Climate data for Shijingshan District, elevation 63 m (207 ft), (1991–2020 normals, extremes 1979–present)
Month	Jan	Feb	Mar	Apr	May	Jun	Jul	Aug	Sep	Oct	Nov	Dec	Year
Record high °C (°F)	14.5 (58.1)	26.0 (78.8)	28.5 (83.3)	33.4 (92.1)	41.9 (107.4)	40.4 (104.7)	41.0 (105.8)	38.2 (100.8)	37.4 (99.3)	31.1 (88.0)	21.8 (71.2)	20.1 (68.2)	41.9 (107.4)
Mean daily maximum °C (°F)	2.6 (36.7)	6.4 (43.5)	13.3 (55.9)	21.2 (70.2)	27.5 (81.5)	30.9 (87.6)	31.8 (89.2)	30.9 (87.6)	26.6 (79.9)	19.4 (66.9)	10.6 (51.1)	3.9 (39.0)	18.8 (65.8)
Daily mean °C (°F)	−2.7 (27.1)	0.6 (33.1)	7.5 (45.5)	15.3 (59.5)	21.4 (70.5)	25.2 (77.4)	27.0 (80.6)	25.9 (78.6)	20.8 (69.4)	13.4 (56.1)	5.0 (41.0)	−1.1 (30.0)	13.2 (55.7)
Mean daily minimum °C (°F)	−7.1 (19.2)	−4.3 (24.3)	1.8 (35.2)	8.9 (48.0)	14.8 (58.6)	19.6 (67.3)	22.5 (72.5)	21.4 (70.5)	15.6 (60.1)	8.2 (46.8)	0.3 (32.5)	−5.2 (22.6)	8.0 (46.5)
Record low °C (°F)	−18.9 (−2.0)	−16.1 (3.0)	−11.9 (10.6)	−2.6 (27.3)	2.9 (37.2)	10.0 (50.0)	14.5 (58.1)	12.6 (54.7)	3.4 (38.1)	−5.6 (21.9)	−11.2 (11.8)	−16.4 (2.5)	−18.9 (−2.0)
Average precipitation mm (inches)	2.1 (0.08)	5.5 (0.22)	9.2 (0.36)	21.6 (0.85)	36.0 (1.42)	85.9 (3.38)	194.9 (7.67)	110.4 (4.35)	57.1 (2.25)	26.9 (1.06)	13.8 (0.54)	2.5 (0.10)	565.9 (22.28)
Average precipitation days (≥ 0.1 mm)	1.4	2.1	2.9	4.6	6.0	10.6	13.0	10.5	7.7	5.3	3.1	1.7	68.9
Average snowy days	2.3	2.3	1.1	0.2	0	0	0	0	0	0	1.5	2.3	9.7
Average relative humidity (%)	43	41	39	42	47	59	71	73	67	61	54	46	54
Mean monthly sunshine hours	173.1	177.3	215.3	227.2	252.3	204.4	168.8	185.5	189.9	183.8	155.0	159.9	2,292.5
Percentage possible sunshine	57	58	58	57	56	46	37	44	51	54	52	55	52
Source: China Meteorological Administration
