= Yangzhuang =

Yangzhuang may refer to the following locations in China:

== Metro stations ==
- Yangzhuang station (Beijing Subway), in Shijingshan District, Beijing
- Yangzhuang station (Nanjing Metro), in Nanjing
- Yangzhuang station (Xuzhou Metro), in Xuzhou

== Places ==
Subdistrict

- Yangzhuang, Beijing, subdistrict in Tongzhou District, Beijing

Towns

- Yangzhuang, Tengzhou (羊庄镇), in Tengzhou, Shandong

Written as "杨庄镇":

- Yangzhuang, Sanhe, Hebei
- Yangzhuang, Baofeng County, in Baofeng County, Henan
- Yangzhuang, Laiwu, in Laicheng District, Laiwu, Shandong
- Yangzhuang, Yishui County, in Yishui County, Shandong

Townships

- Yangzhuang Township, Wuyishan (洋庄乡), in Wuyishan City, Fujian

Written as "杨庄乡":

- Yangzhuang Township, Suzhou, Anhui, in Yongqiao District, Suzhou, Anhui
- Yangzhuang Township, Baoding, in Nanshi District, Baoding, Hebei
- Yangzhuang Township, Wugang, Henan, in Wugang, Henan
- Yangzhuang Township, Xiping County, in Xiping County, Henan
- Yangzhuang Township, Xi'an, in Chang'an District, Xi'an, Shaanxi
- Yangzhuang Township, Wucheng County, in Wucheng County, Shandong
