= Babaoshan station =

Beijing Subway Line 1 station

Babaoshan 八宝山
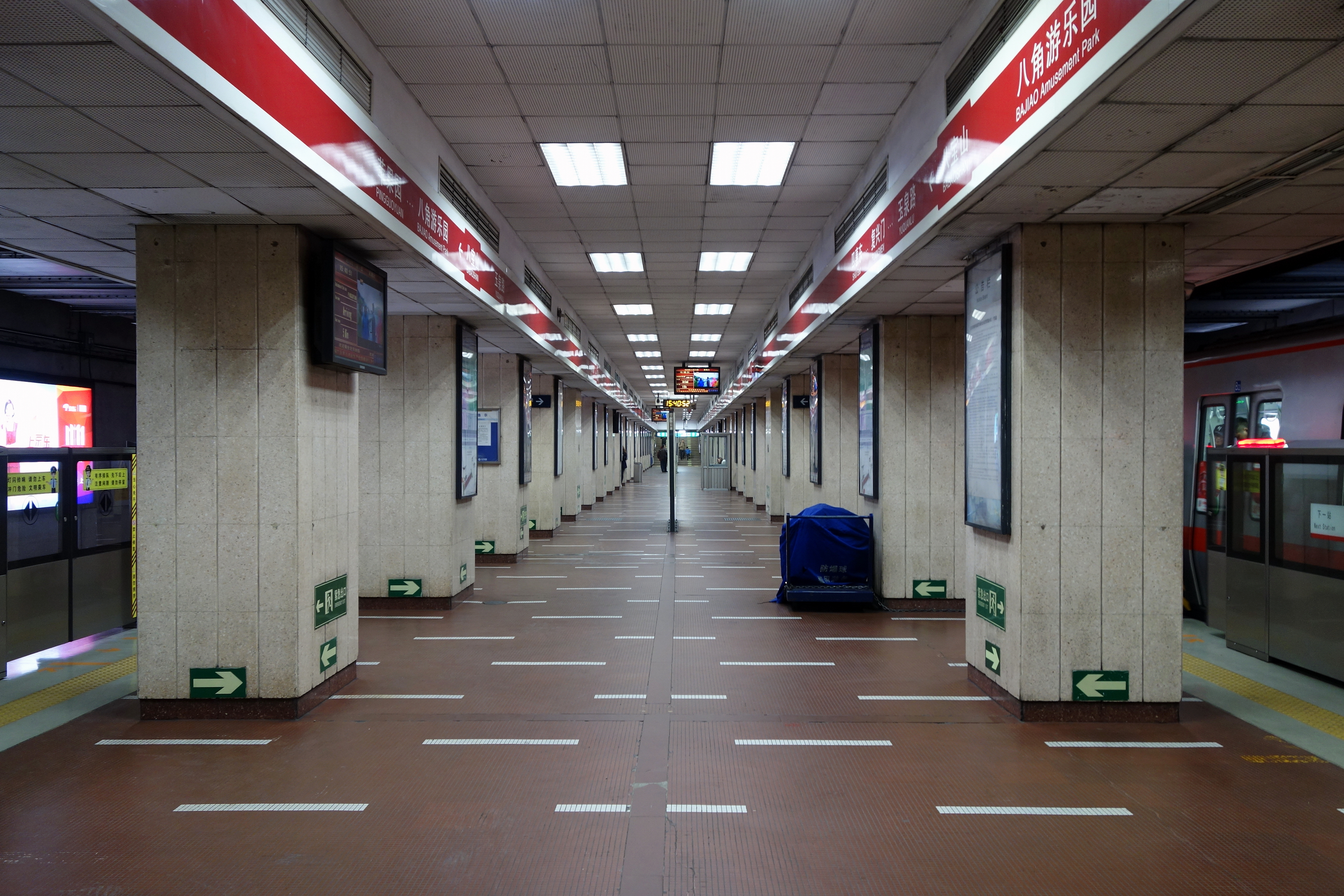
- Platform

General information
- Location: Shijingshan Road and Shangzhuang Street (上庄大街)/Lugu East Street (鲁谷东街); Babaoshan Subdistrict, Shijingshan District, Beijing
- Coordinates: 39°54′27″N 116°14′09″E
- Operator: Beijing Mass Transit Railway Operation Corporation Limited
- Line: Line 1
- Platforms: 2 (1 island platform)
- Tracks: 2

Construction
- Structure type: Underground
- Accessible: Yes

Other information
- Station code: 106

History
- Opened: November 7, 1971; 54 years ago

Services
Preceding station	Beijing Subway	Following station
Gucheng towards Pingguoyuan	Line 1	Yuquan Lu towards Universal Resort
Location
- Location within Beijing

Babaoshan station (simplified Chinese: 八宝山站; traditional Chinese: 八寶山站; pinyin: Bābǎoshān zhàn) is a station on Line 1 of the Beijing Subway. It is named after Babaoshan Subdistrict in Shijingshan District, Beijing, where the station located in. It is located near the Babaoshan Revolutionary Cemetery.

Between February 15 and May 15, 2026, due to facilitation works on Line 1 Branch at Bajiao Amusement Park, the station was closed due to not having a crossing line for train turnback before Bajiao Amusement Park (along with Gucheng), before it was reopened on May 16, 2026.

== Station layout ==
The station has an underground island platform.

== Exits ==
The station has four exits, lettered A, B, C and D. All exits are accessible.

== Gallery ==
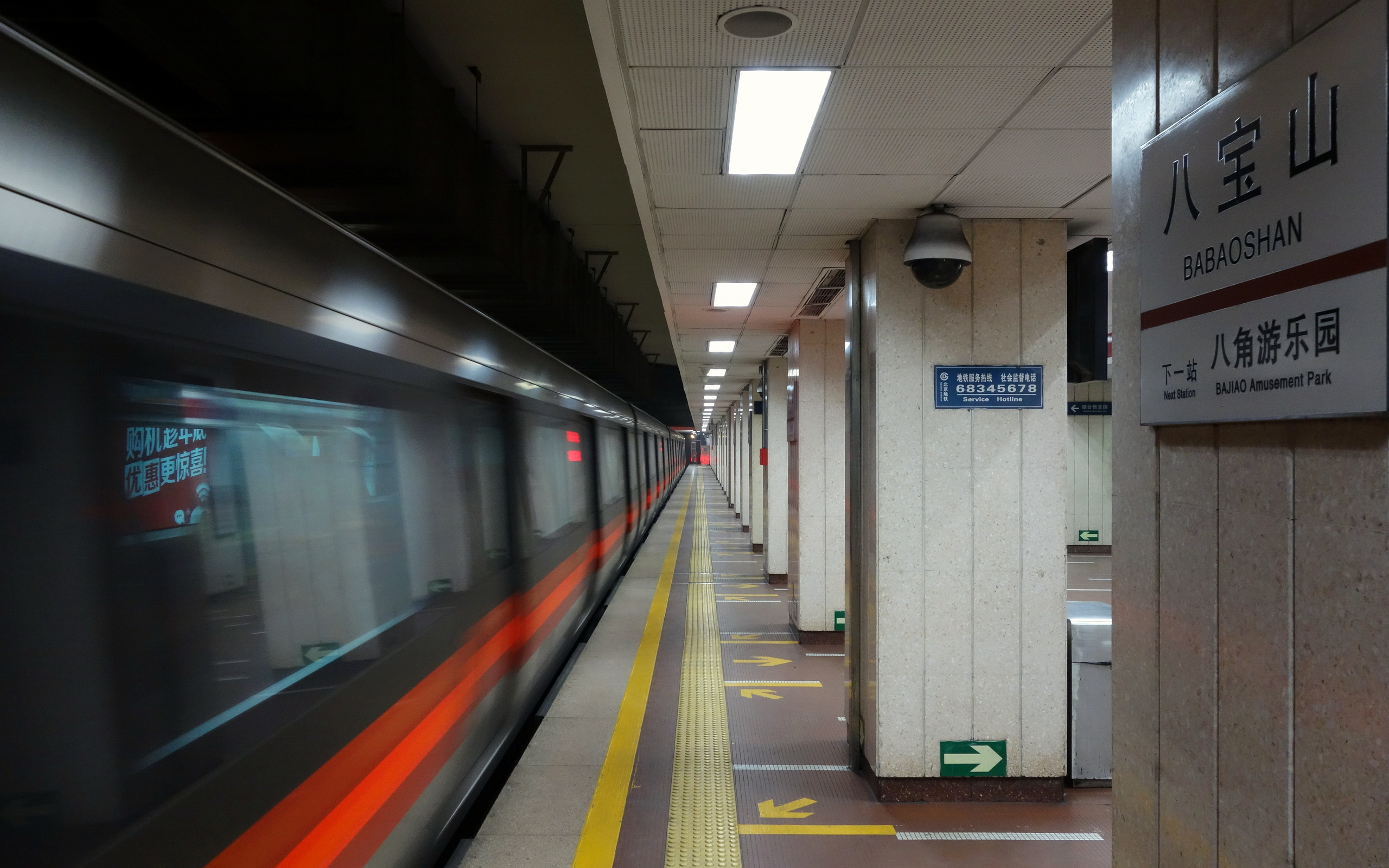
Station platform

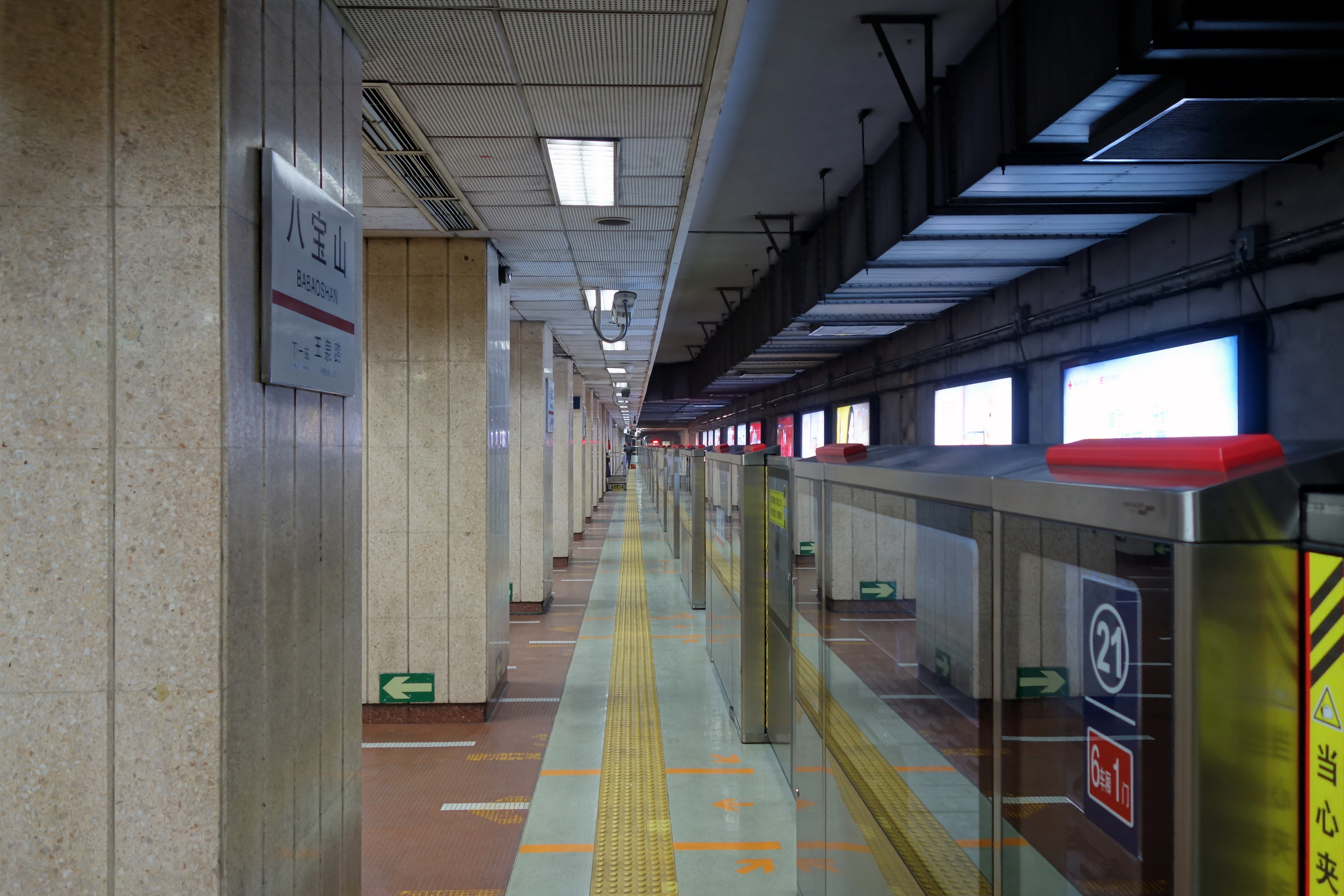
In 2017, Safety door was installed on the platform

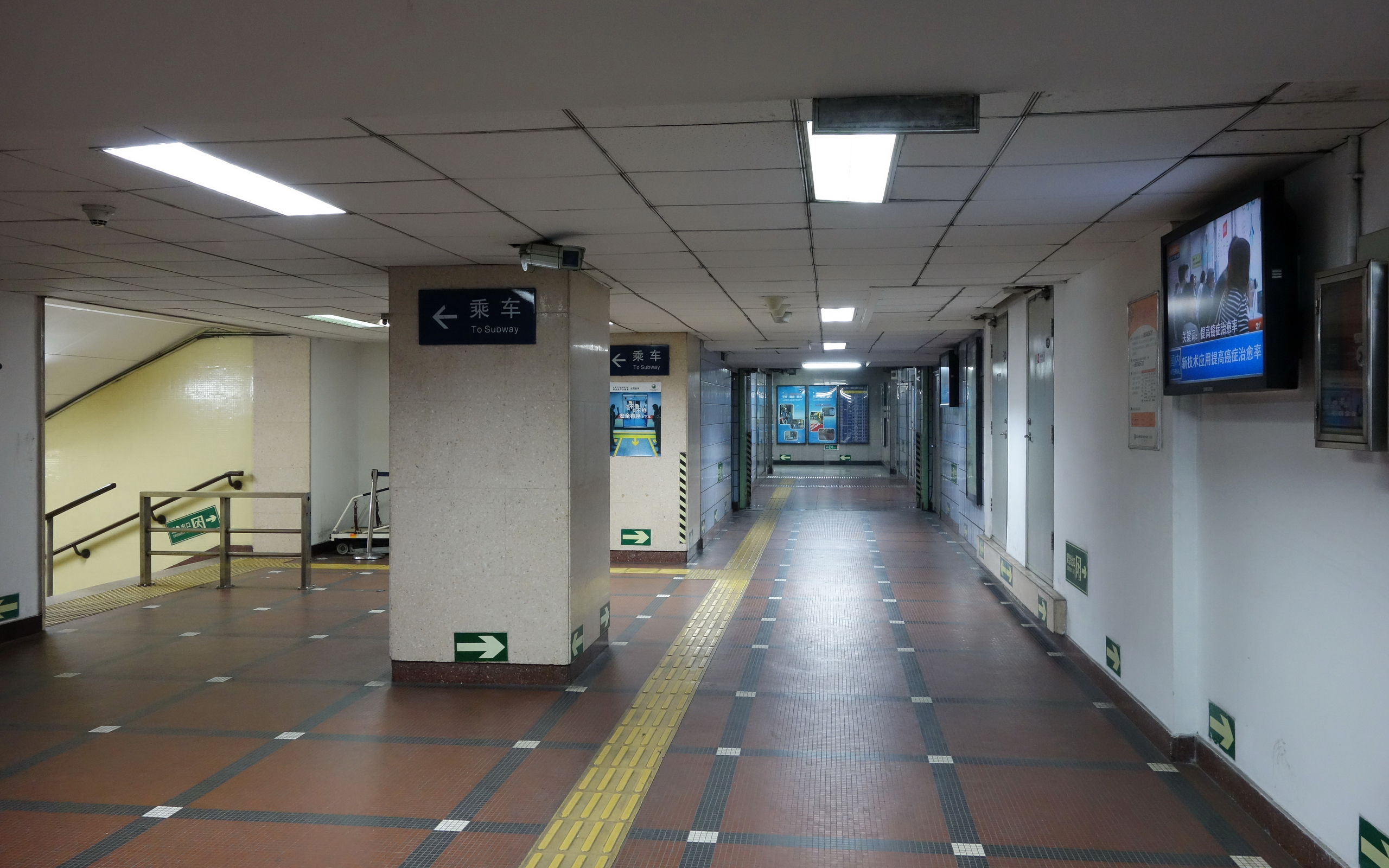
Station Hall
