= North China University of Technology =

University in Shijingshan, Beijing, China

- 北方工业大学
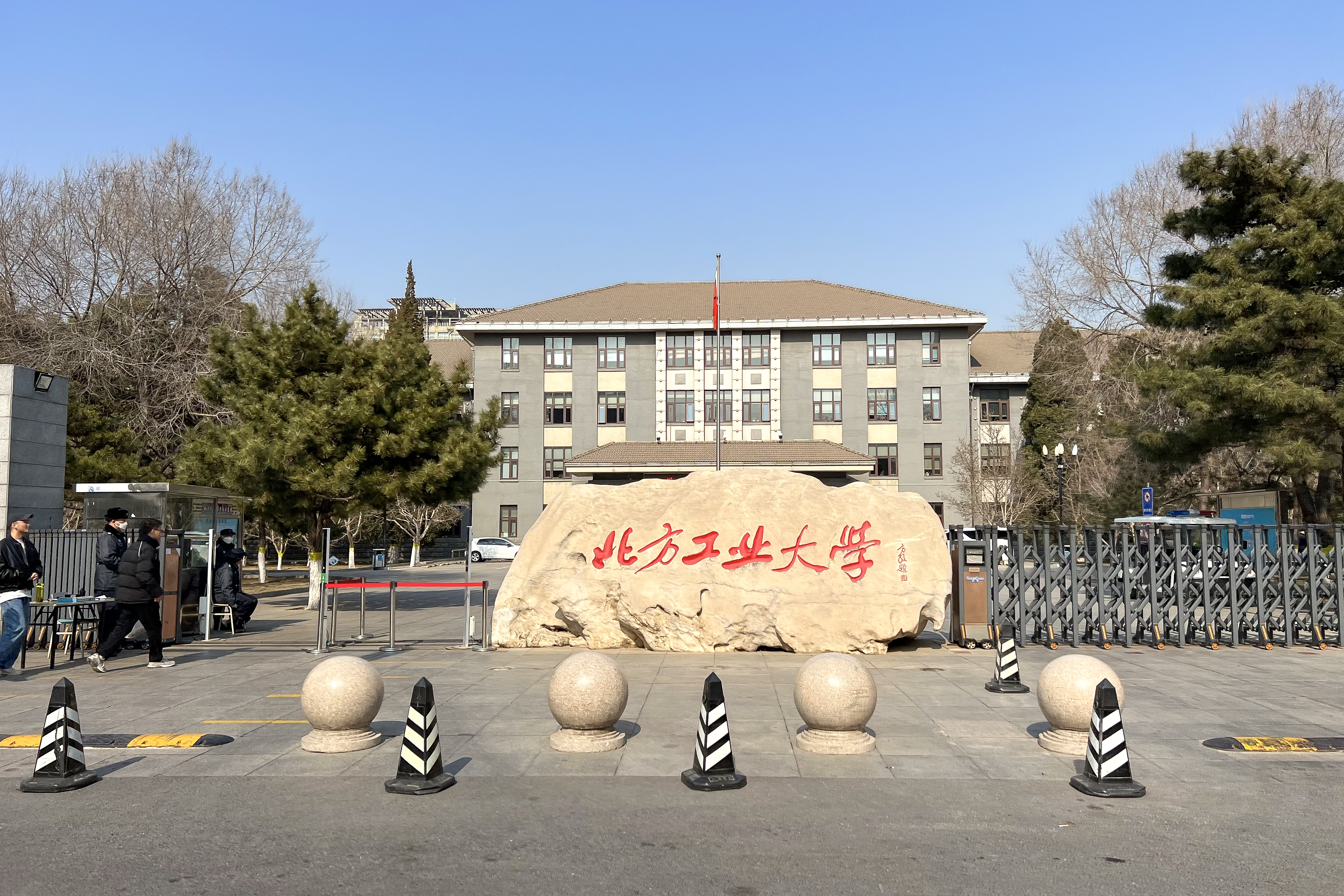
- Motto: 敦品励学，才德并懋
- Motto in English: Assiduous Learning and Self-Discipline
- Type: Public
- Established: 1947; 79 years ago
- President: Wentang Zheng
- Administrative staff: 550
- Students: 16000
- Undergraduates: 10184
- Postgraduates: 2300
- Other students: 3600
- Location: Beijing, China
- Campus: urban: Shijingshan District
- Website: en.ncut.edu.cn

Chinese name
- Simplified Chinese: 北方工业大学
- Traditional Chinese: 北方工業大學
Transcriptions
Standard Mandarin
- Hanyu Pinyin: Běifāng Gōngyè Dàxué

The North China University of Technology (北方工业大学) is a municipal public university in Shijingshan, Beijing, China. It is affiliated with the City of Beijing and funded by the municipal government.

The predecessor was the national Beiping advanced industrial vocational school, founded in 1946. The Central Committee and Beijing City, with the Beijing city management as the main, is the key construction of the Beijing city of multidisciplinary colleges and universities, also the Ministry of education "excellent engineer education and training". North China University of Technology has 10 colleges, 30 majors, 12 teaching and experimental centers, and 9 research and design institutes.

== History ==
- In 1946, the predecessor of the North China University of Technology was founded in the National Advanced Industrial Vocational School of Beiping. After the founding of new China, the school experienced several development stages, such as Beijing heavy industry school, Beijing iron and steel school, Beijing Metallurgy College, Shijingshan Metallurgy College and so on.
- In 1978, approved by the State Council, the Beijing metallurgical electromechanical college was established.
- In 1984, the school was placed under the leadership of the China Nonferrous Metals Industry Corporation. Approved by the State Council in 1985, it was renamed North China University of Technology by Beijing metallurgical electromechanical college.
- In 1998, the school was built jointly by the central government and the Beijing municipality, mainly by the management of Beijing.
- In 1998, after the school was assigned to the management of Beijing, in order to meet the needs of economic and social development, the school put forward the service orientation of "based on Beijing, facing the whole country, facing the non-ferrous metal industry, focusing on the economic and social development of the capital".

== Schools ==
- School of Architecture and Art
- School of Computer
- School of Civil Engineering
- School of Continuing Education
- School of Electronic and Information Engineering
- School of Electrical and Control EngineeringT
- School of Economics and Management
- School of Humanities and Law
- School of Mechanical and Materials Engineering
- School of Marxism
- School of Sciences
- International School
- Brunel London School

== History ==
National Beiping Advanced Industrial Vocational School

In 1946, with the advocacy and efforts of Shen Jianshi and Chen Guangxi, Beiping Senior Industrial Vocational School was founded. At the end of April, "National Higher Engineering" began to recruit students. In order to improve the conditions of running a school, a Japanese iron factory in Xizhimen was temporarily borrowed from the school after consultation with the special commissioners of the Ministry of Education and the Ministry of Economic Affairs. Schools are subordinate to the Ministry of Education of the National Government and belong to the nature of "state".

In early 1950, Beijing senior workers moved to Prince Alcohol House.

On January 1, 1951, the original "Beijing Polytechnic" was officially renamed "Beijing Heavy Industry School" and a new school seal was introduced. In addition, the steering committee of China Geological Industry Plan entrusted Beijing Re-school to set up the exploration department on its behalf.

Beijing Iron and Steel Industry School

On December 8, 1952, "Beijing Machinery Manufacturing School" was declared. "Beijing Iron and Steel Industry School" was also established in the same period. The school is under the leadership of the Iron and Steel Bureau of the Ministry of Heavy Industry.

In 1955, according to the decision of the State Council, the school was placed under the direct leadership of the Ministry of Heavy Industry.

Beijing College of Metallurgical Mechatronics

On October 6, 1959, the Ministry of Metallurgical Industry handed over Beijing Metallurgical College to Shijingshan Iron and Steel Company under the leadership of the Ministry of Metallurgical Industry in accordance with the opinions issued by the Central Committee on higher education institutions and secondary technical schools.

Beijing Institute of Metallurgy and Mechanical Technology

In May 1979, the College established the Department of Metallurgy and the Department of Mechanical and Electrical Engineering.

From 1980 to 1983, entrusted by the Ministry of Metallurgical Industry, the College held six courses for leading cadres of metallurgical system colleges and universities.

In 1984, the school was placed under the leadership of China Nonferrous Metals Industry Corporation.

North China University of Technology

In 1985, with the approval of the State Council, Beijing Institute of Metallurgy and Mechanical Technology was renamed North China University of Technology.

In December 1993, the school officially became the fifth batch of units authorized to grant master's degrees in China.

In June 1999, after strict demonstration by the Beijing Municipal Education Commission, the school was allowed to hold higher vocational and technical education. In 2002, the school officially established the Graduate Department, and co-operated with the Scientific Research Department.

In October 2011, the school was selected as the second batch of outstanding engineer education training program of the Ministry of Education.

In December 2012, with the approval of the Academic Degree Committee of the State Council, the school was qualified to serve the special needs of the state doctoral training program.

In 2015, the school comprehensively implemented large-scale enrollment and training.

In February 2017, the Institute of Control Engineering of Northern University of Technology and the Institute of Sponge City and Underground Space of Northern University of Technology were established.

== Research ==
According to the September 2014 official website, the school has undertaken the National Natural Science Foundation of China, the major and key projects of the state and Beijing City, such as the "863" plan, the science and technology support plan, and so on. It has completed more than 1000 lateral projects to cooperate with the enterprise. More than 70 achievements have been identified by the provincial and ministerial level, more than 70 national patents have been obtained, and academic papers are published 5. More than 000 articles, of which more than 8000 papers have been collected by SCI and EI, have published more than 220 monographs or translations. Scientific research achievements have been awarded more than 50 awards from provincial and ministerial level, and have won 4 awards for two national scientific and technological progress. In particular, during the "11th Five-Year" period, the school won 21 awards above the provincial and ministerial level, including 3 National Scientific and technological progress, 3 provincial and ministerial first prize and 1 Lu Xun prize for literature. The total amount of scientific research funds was over two. In 2010, 1 items such as national scientific and technological progress two and 1 Lu Xun prize for literature were awarded. The number of high level papers retrieved by SCI, EI, ISTP and CSSCI was 490, seven times more than in 2006. In 2012, he won two national scientific and technological progress two prize.

== Education and teaching ==
By the end of December 2012, there are 3 national specialty construction points at the national level, 5 specialty construction specialties in Beijing, 2 national high quality courses, 10 top-quality courses in Beijing, and at the same time the University of national college students' cultural quality education base. The school also has 1 excellent teaching teams at the municipal level in Beijing, 1 national experimental teaching demonstration centers (comprehensive engineering training centers), and 5 experimental teaching and demonstration centers at the municipal level in Beijing.

There are 1 national teaching achievements and two prize winners. The first prize of teaching achievement in Beijing municipal level is 3. The state has 13 teaching materials in 11th Five-Year and 21 in the Beijing municipal level.

=== Students ===
Since 1998, the college baseball team won 7 National Championships, and the softball team won 2 National Championships. In 2000, the baseball team visited Japan, Hong Kong, Taiwan and other countries and regions. In addition, men's basketball teams, men's volleyball teams and women's table tennis teams have also won many top three achievements in Beijing's universities. The school is the chairman of the baseball and softball branch of China University Sports Association. Baseball and softball sports have the qualification to recruit high-level athletes.

All kinds of major competitions in the school are fruitful. In the National College Students' electronic design contest, the "Challenge Cup" national college student inventions competition, the Beijing university student mathematics contest (A and b), the Beijing college student physics competition, the National College English competition and other major competitions in Beijing, there are more than 2000 special prizes. One or two, three and other awards.

=== Teaching ===
By the end of December 2012, the school has 1 outstanding teachers at the national level, 7 famous teachers in Beijing, 5 local high level talents, 1 outstanding contribution experts, 3 Beijing talents, 2 outstanding young intellectuals in Beijing, 12 city level innovation teams, and 13 municipal innovator and municipal science and technology. There are 5 new stars, 81 municipal and middle-aged backbone teachers.

=== International academic exchange ===
More than 340 students are sent to university cooperative schools in Europe, America, Japan and other countries each year. From 2007 to 2010, there were 374 students from North China University of Technology who sent abroad to study abroad. In 2010, only 148 students were sent to foreign friendly colleges and universities to exchange study or participate in joint training. At the same time, more than 190 long term foreign students were enrolled in the school, and more than 220 teachers from foreign friendship colleges and universities were interviewed. Questions, lectures, academic exchanges, short-term learning or communication.

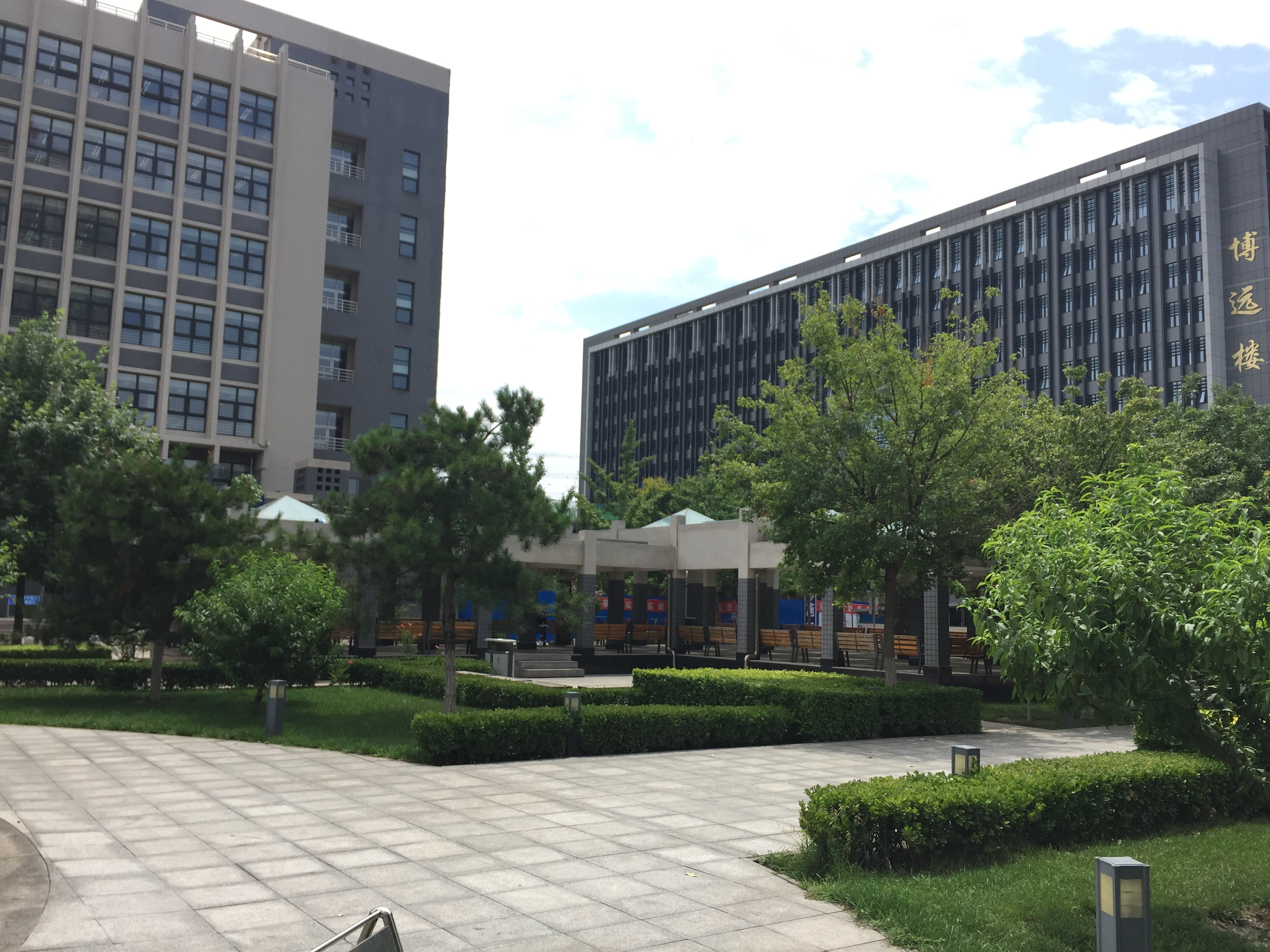

== Alumni ==
- Wang Zhongjun – Founder of Huayi Brothers Media.
- Liu Donghai – Founder of Digitong Energy Technology
- Yongqiang Qian – Founder of New Oriental
