= Laoshan Subdistrict =

Laoshan Subdistrict 老山街道
- Subdistrict
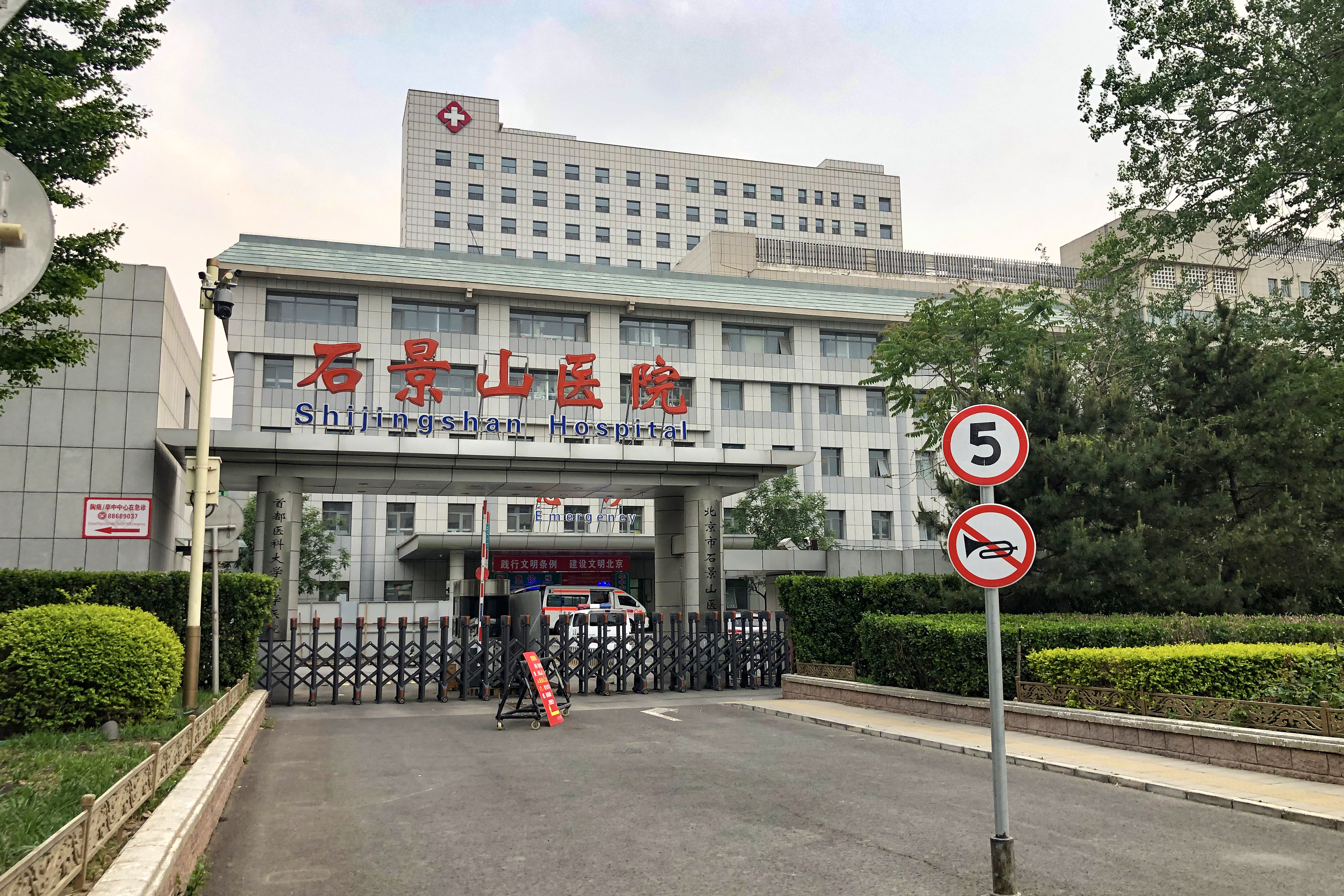
- Shijingshan Hospital on the center of the subdistrict, 2021

- Location within Beijing Location within China
- Coordinates: 39°54′34″N 116°12′59″E
- Country: China
- Municipality: Beijing
- District: Shijingshan
- Village-level Divisions: 12 communities

Area
  - Total: 6.21 km^{2} (2.40 sq mi)

Population (2020)
  - Total: 40,023
  - Density: 6,440/km^{2} (16,700/sq mi)
- Time zone: UTC+8 (China Standard)
- Postal code: 100040
- Area code: 010

Laoshan Subdistrict (Chinese: 老山街道; pinyin: Lǎoshān Jiēdào) is a subdistrict on the southeast of Shijingshan District, Beijing, China. It borders Tiancunlu Subdistrict to the north, Wangshoulu and Yongdinglu Subdistricts to the east, Lugu and Babaoshan Subdistricts to the south, and Bajiao Subdistrict to the west. In 2020, it had a population of 40,023.

This subdistrict is located on the southern slope of Laoshan (Chinese: 老山; lit. 'Old Mountain'), and thus named after the mountain.

== Administrative Division ==
As of 2021, Laoshan Subdistrict consists of 12 communities:

| Administrative division code | Subdivision names | Name transliteration |
|---|---|---|
| 110107002001 | 高能所 | Gaonengsuo |
| 110107002002 | 中国科学院大学 | Zhongguo Kexueyuan Daxue |
| 110107002003 | 玉泉西路 | Yuquan Xilu |
| 110107002009 | 何家坟 | Hejiafen |
| 110107002011 | 老山东里北 | Laoshan Dongli Bei |
| 110107002013 | 老山东里 | Laoshan Dongli |
| 110107002015 | 老山东里南 | Laoshan Dongli Nan |
| 110107002017 | 老山西里 | Laoshan Xili |
| 110107002018 | 十一号院 | Shiyihaoyuan |
| 110107002019 | 翠谷玉景苑 | Cuigu Yujingyuan |
| 110107002020 | 京源路 | Jingyuanlu |
| 110107002021 | 玉泉北里二区第一 | Yuquan Beili Erqu Diyi |

== See also ==
- List of township-level divisions of Beijing
