= Gucheng Subdistrict, Beijing =

Gucheng Subdistrict 古城街道
- Subdistrict
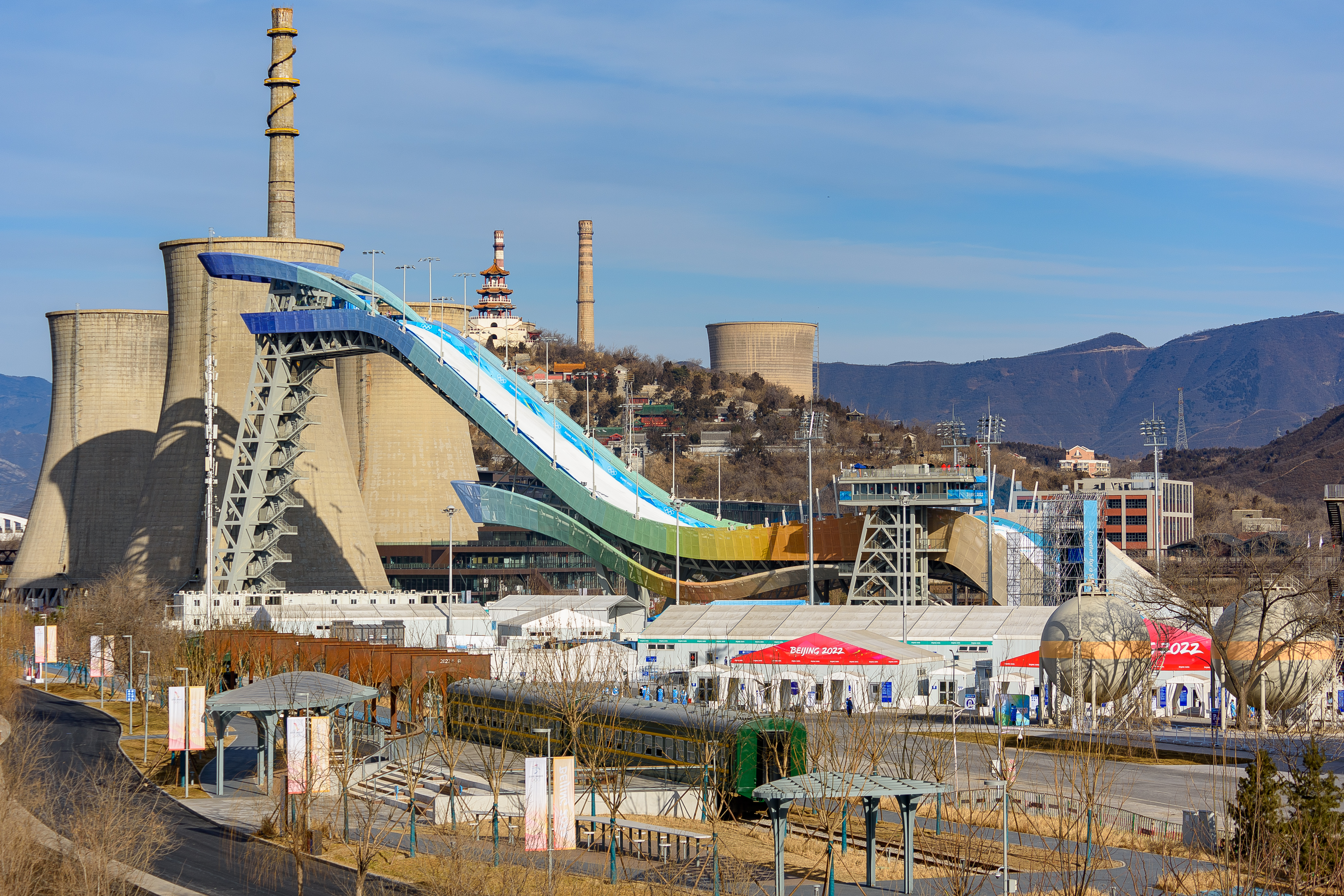
- Big Air Shougang inside the subdistrict, 2022

- Location within Beijing Location within China
- Coordinates: 39°54′49″N 116°10′47″E
- Country: China
- Municipality: Beijing
- District: Shijingshan
- Village-level Divisions: 21 communities

Area
  - Total: 15.41 km^{2} (5.95 sq mi)

Population (2020)
  - Total: 67,685
  - Density: 4,392/km^{2} (11,380/sq mi)
- Time zone: UTC+8 (China Standard)
- Postal code: 100043
- Area code: 010

Gucheng Subdistrict (Chinese: 古城街道; pinyin: Gǔchéng Jiēdào) is a subdistrict located in the center of Shijingshan District, Beijing, China. It shares border with Guangning, Jindingjie and Pingguoyuan Subdistrict in the north, Lugu and Bajiao Subdistricts in the east, Beigong Town in the south, and Yongding Township in the west. In 2020, it had a population of 67,685.

The subdistrict name, Gucheng (Chinese: 古城; lit. 'Old City'), was inherited from a village that used to exist in the region.

== History ==
History of Gucheng Subdistrict
Time	Status
1954	Part of Shijingshang Steel Mill Worker's Family Committee
1958	Transferred to Fengtai District and formed a production team
1963	Formed Xingucheng Subdistrict
1979	Renamed Gucheng Subdistrict
1996	Incorporated Beixin'an Subdistrict

== Administrative Division ==
In 2021, Gucheng Subdistrict is made up of 21 communities:

Administrative division code	Subdivision names	Name transliteration
110107004001	北小区	Beixiaoqu
110107004002	南路东	Nanlu Dong
110107004005	南路西	Nanlu Xi
110107004006	环铁	Huantie
110107004007	天翔	Tianxiang
110107004009	八千平	Baqianping
110107004010	古城路	Guchenglu
110107004011	古城特钢	Gucheng Tegang
110107004012	西路北	Xilu Bei
110107004013	十万平	Shiwanping
110107004014	西路南	Xilu Nan
110107004017	北辛安南北岔	Beixin'an Nanbeicha
110107004021	北辛安大街	Beixin'an Dajie
110107004026	北辛安铁新	Beixin'an Tiexin
110107004027	水泥厂	Shuinichang
110107004029	老古城东	Laogucheng Dong
110107004030	老古城西	Laogucheng Xi
110107004031	滨和园燕堤南路	Binheyuan Yandi Nanlu
110107004032	滨和园燕堤西街	Binheyuan Yandi Xijie
110107004033	滨和园燕堤中街	Binheyuan Yandi Zhongjie
110107004034	老古城南	Laogujie Nan

== See also ==
- List of township-level divisions of Beijing
