= Yangzhuang station (Beijing Subway) =

Beijing Subway station

Yangzhuang 杨庄
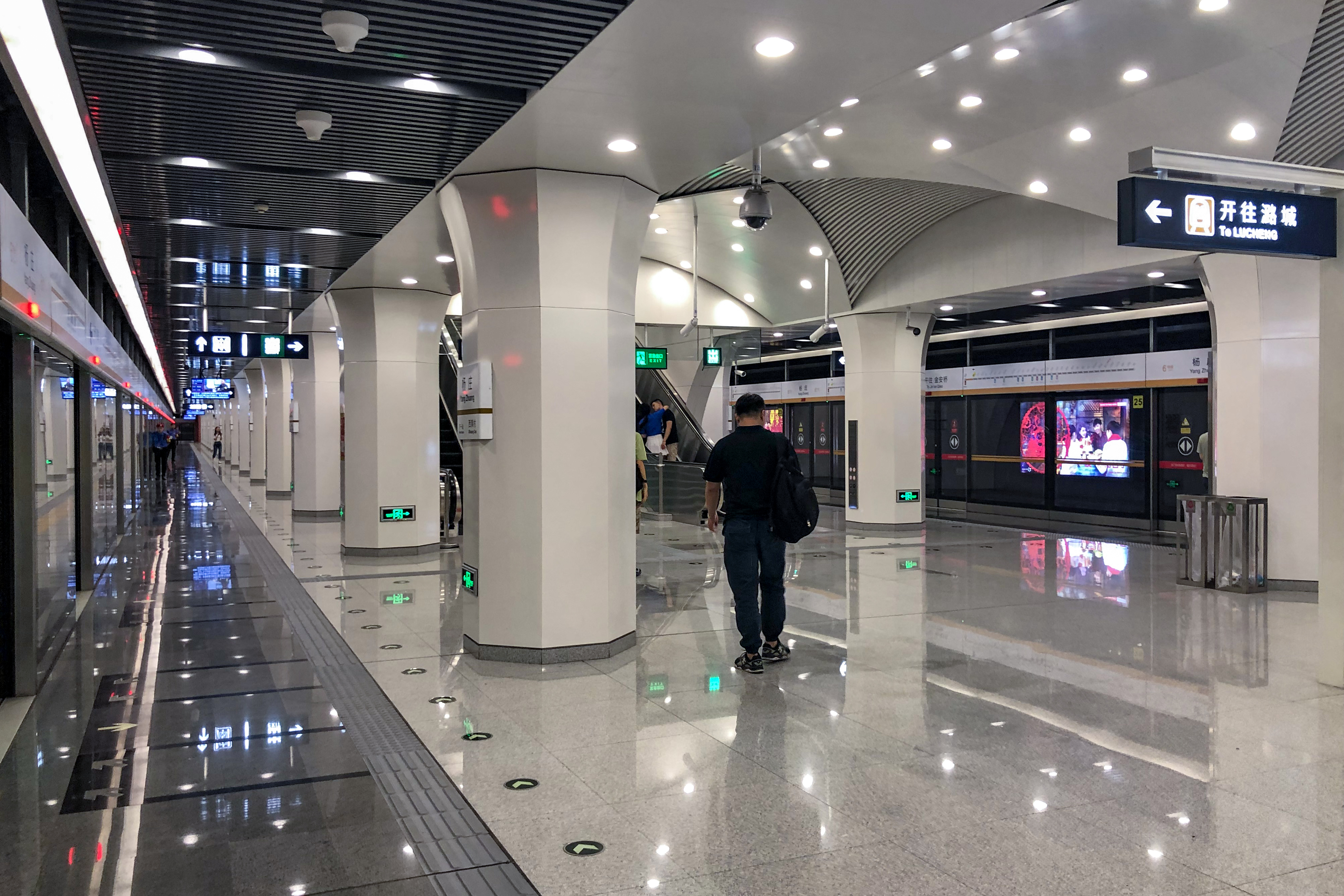
- Platform

General information
- Other names: Pingguoyuannanlu (苹果园南路)
- Location: Pingguoyuan Subdistrict, Shijingshan District, Beijing; China
- Coordinates: 39.926729°N 116.182473°E
- Operator: Beijing Mass Transit Railway Operation Corporation Limited
- Line: Line 6
- Platforms: 2 (1 island platform)
- Tracks: 2

Construction
- Structure type: Underground
- Accessible: Yes

History
- Opened: December 30, 2018; 7 years ago

Services
Preceding station	Beijing Subway	Following station
Pingguoyuan towards Jin'anqiao	Line 6	Xihuangcun towards Luyang
Location
- Location within Beijing

Yangzhuang station (Chinese: 杨庄站; pinyin: Yáng Zhuāng zhàn) is a station on Line 6 of the Beijing Subway. It was opened on December 30, 2018.

== Station layout ==
The station has an underground island platform.

== Exits ==
There are 4 exits, lettered A, B, C1, and C2. Exits A and C1 are accessible.
