= Big Air Shougang =

Snowboarding venue in Shijingshan, Beijing

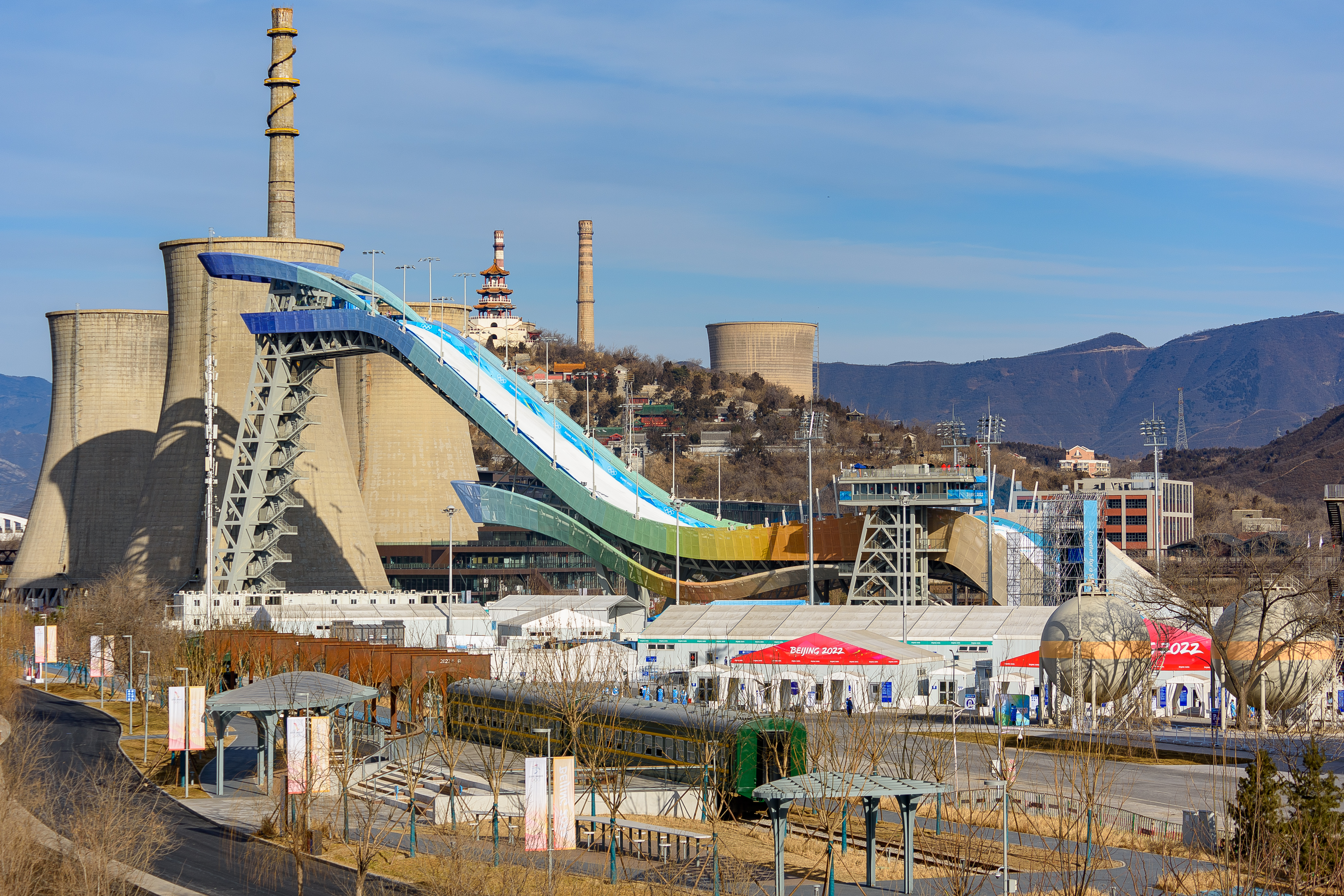
- Interactive map of Big Air Shougang
- Location: Shijingshan District, Beijing
- Coordinates: 39.91057°N 116.14522°E
- Capacity: Big air: 4,912
- Type: Stadium

Construction
- Groundbreaking: 2018
- Opened: 2019

Big Air Shougang (Chinese: 首钢滑雪大跳台; pinyin: Shǒugāng huáxuě dà tiàotái) is a sports stadium in the Shijingshan District in Beijing, China, built to host the big air events of the 2022 Winter Olympics. It is the world's first permanent big air venue.

The venue is located at the site of a former steel mill of Shougang Group, which was closed in January 2011 due to its air pollution. Construction ran from 2018 to 1 November 2019.

The facility was one of two competition venues built in Beijing for the 2022 Winter Olympics, and the only snow sports venue in the city. Four medal events were contested at the Games: the freestyle skiing big air competition for men and women, along with the snowboarding big air competition for men and women. The venue received attention for its location in a snow-free industrial area next to cooling towers and away from mountains. The venue has become a symbol of China's urban renewal.
