= Bajiao Amusement Park station =

Beijing Subway station

Bajiao Amusement Park 八角游乐园
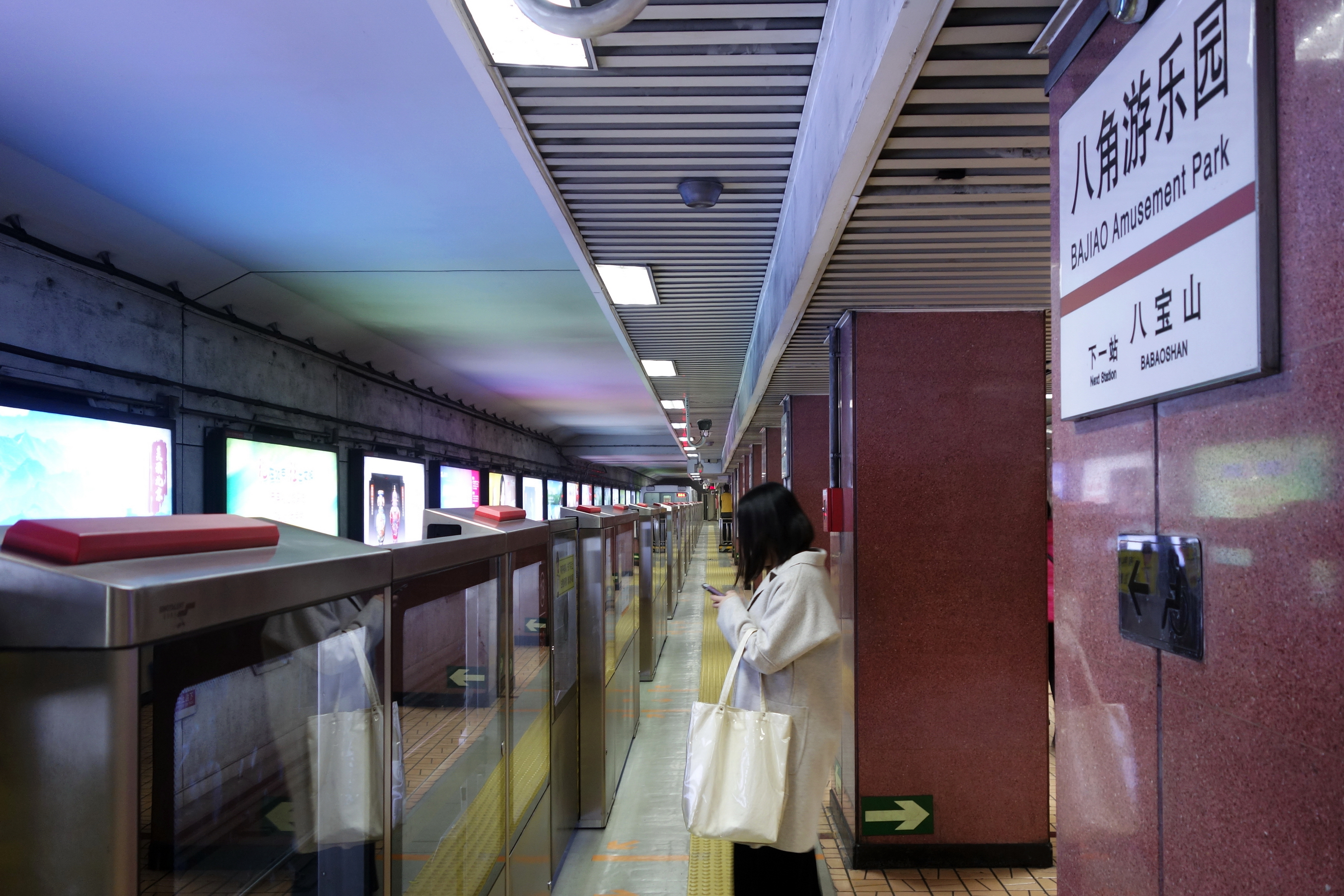
- Eastbound platform

General information
- Location: Shijingshan Road (石景山路) and West 5th Ring Road; Shijingshan District, Beijing; China
- Coordinates: 39°54′27″N 116°12′46″E
- Operator: Beijing Mass Transit Railway Operation Corporation Limited
- Line: Line 1
- Platforms: 4 (2 side platforms, with two expansions to split island platform under construction)
- Tracks: 4 (2 exist, 2 under construction)

Construction
- Structure type: Underground
- Accessible: Yes

Other information
- Status: Suspended service for station expansion
- Station code: 105

History
- Opened: November 7, 1971; 54 years ago
- Closed: June 2, 2025; 14 months ago (for expansion until May 3, 2027)

Services
Preceding station	Beijing Subway	Following station
Service suspended
Gucheng towards Pingguoyuan	Line 1	Babaoshan towards Universal Resort
Under construction
Yamenkou Xi (W) towards Qinglonghu Dong (E)	Line 1 Branch	Babaoshan towards Universal Resort
Location
- Location within Beijing

Bajiao Amusement Park station (simplified Chinese: 八角游乐园站; traditional Chinese: 八角遊樂園站; pinyin: Bājiǎo Yóulèyuán Zhàn) is a station on Line 1 of the Beijing Subway. It is near Beijing Shijingshan Amusement Park. The station has closed for reconstruction on June 2, 2025, to facilitate work on the Line 1 Branch Line, and will not reopen until May 3, 2027.

== Station layout ==
Initially, the station has 2 underground side platforms. To accept new tracks towared to Line 1 branch, 2 side platforms are under construction.

== Exits ==
The station had two exits, lettered A and B. Both were accessible. Due to the re-construction of the concourse as part of the station expansion, both exits were permanently closed, demolished and expected to be replaced by four newly built exits.

== Gallery ==
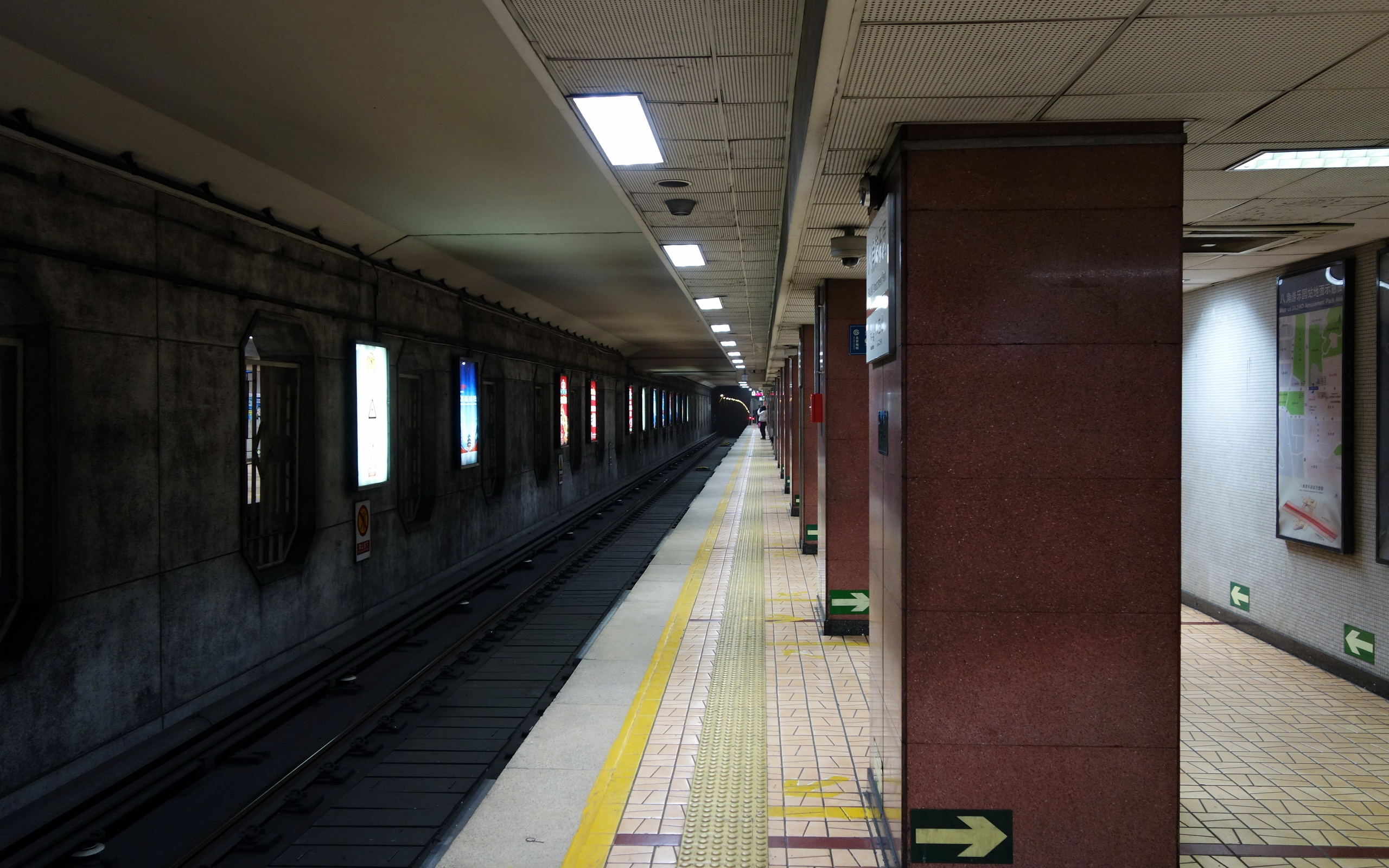
Platform before the platform screen doors were installed

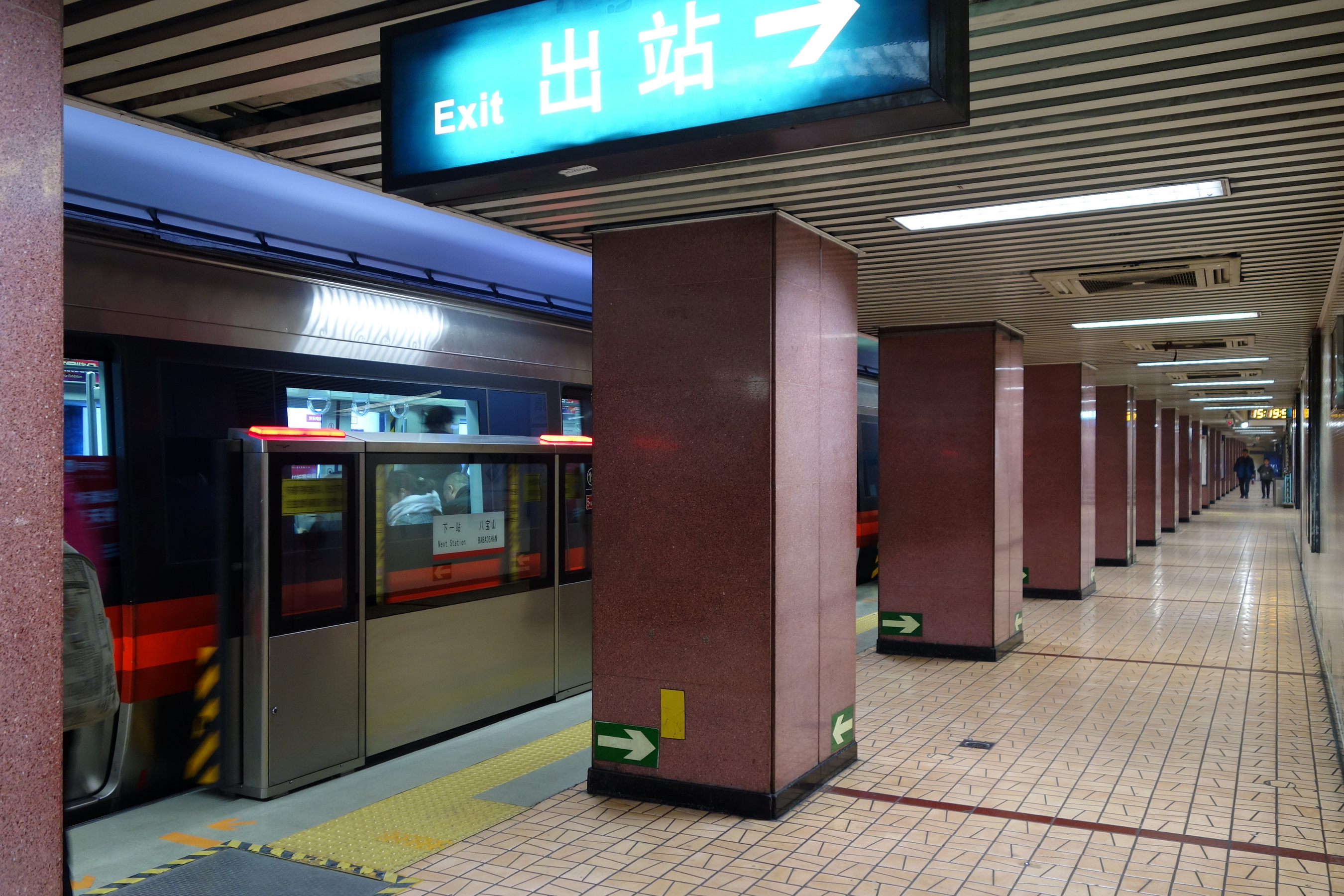
In 2017, platform screen doors were installed on the platform

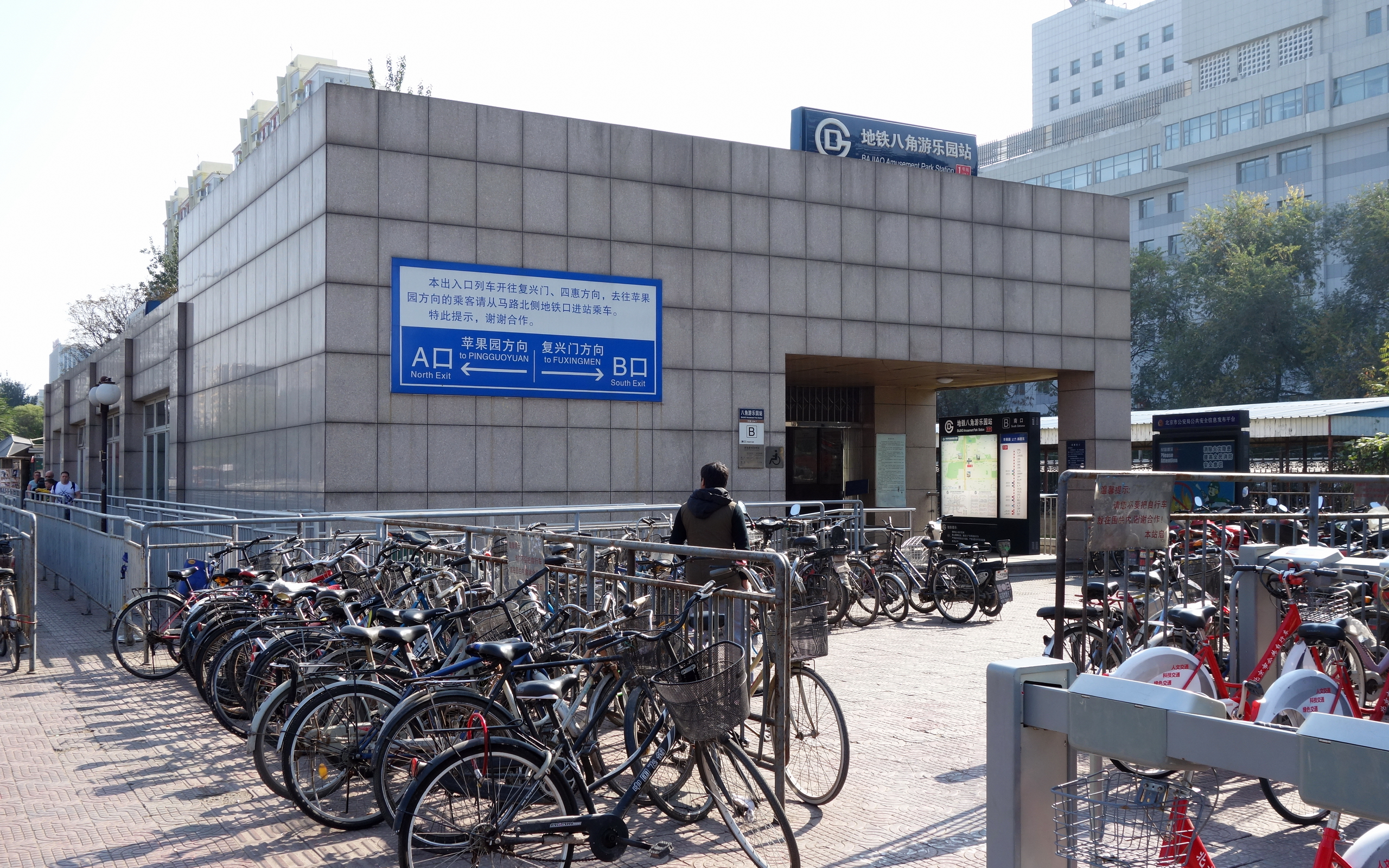
Original Street Level Station Hall

== Station closure ==
Line 1 Branch will be connected to the Line 1 mainline at this station, so the project will need to renovate and expand this station. According to the second announcement of the environmental impact assessment of the Line 1 Branch Line project released in October 2023, this station will construct a new platform for the branch line of Line 1, and the new platform will be combined with the existing Line 1 platform to form a separate island platform, so that the station will become a double-island four-track station, which is extremely rare in China.

In March 2024, the China Railway Tunnel Engineering Bureau announced the installation and construction on Shijingshan Stadium South Road in Beijing, announcing that in order to implement the construction of the branch line of Line 1, the station is planned to be closed from July 2024 to 2027, and Gucheng and Pingguoyuan stations west of the station will be closed until February 2025. This plan was only a preliminary plan of the construction party. As of March 2025, this plan has not been approved by the Beijing Municipal People's Government and other relevant departments at higher levels, except for Pingguoyuan Station, which is still in the stage of closure and reconstruction. All stations of Line 1 within this section, including this station itself, were still not closed. Since June 2, 2025, the station was closed, and it is expected to reopen on May 3, 2027.
