= Bajiao Subdistrict, Beijing =

Bajiao Subdistrict 八角街道
- Subdistrict
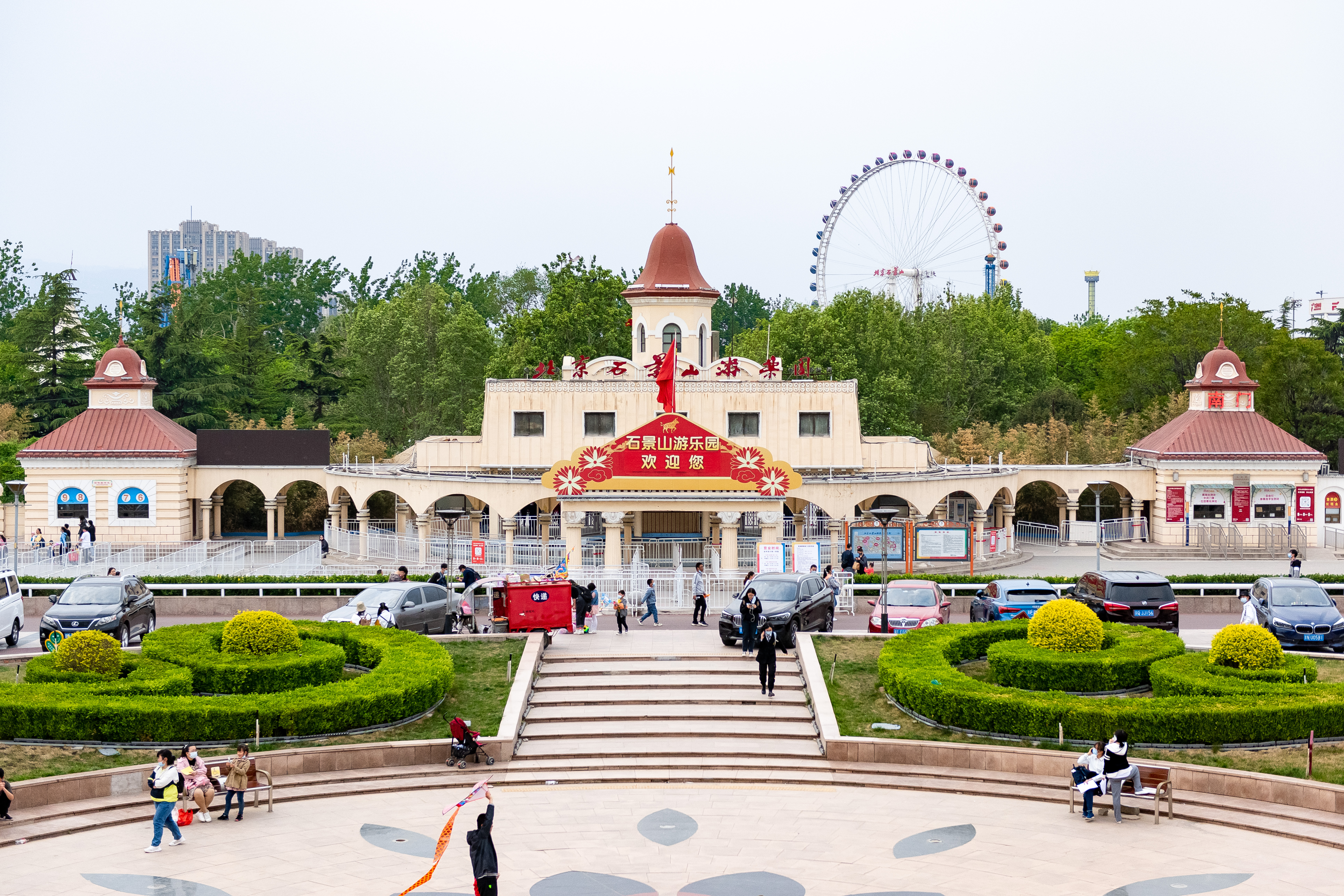
- Shijingshan Amusement Park within the subdistrict, 2021

- Location within Beijing Location within China
- Coordinates: 39°54′52″N 116°11′24″E
- Country: China
- Municipality: Beijing
- District: Shijingshan
- Village-level Divisions: 23 communities

Area
  - Total: 6.3 km^{2} (2.4 sq mi)

Population (2020)
  - Total: 110,929
  - Density: 18,000/km^{2} (46,000/sq mi)
- Time zone: UTC+8 (China Standard)
- Postal code: 100043
- Area code: 010

Bajiao Subdistrict (Chinese: 八角街道; pinyin: Bājiǎo Jiēdào) is a subdistrict on the southeastern part of Shijingshan District, Beijing, China. It borders Pingguoyuan Subdistrict to its north, Sijiqing, Tiancunlu and Laoshan Subdistricts to its east, Lugu Subdistrict to its south, and Gucheng Subdistrict to its west. As of 2020, its population was 110,929.

The subdistrict was established in 1983, and got its name Bajiao (Chinese: 八角; lit. 'Eight Angles') from a village that predated the subdistrict.

== Administrative Division ==
As of 2021, Bajiao Subdistrict contains a total of 23 communities:

Administrative division code	Subdivision names	Name transliteration
110107003007	八角北里	Bajiao Beili
110107003009	八角中里	Bajiao Zhongli
110107003016	建钢南里	Jiangang Nanli
110107003018	古城南里	Gucheng Nanli
110107003024	八角南路	Bajiao Nanlu
110107003025	古城南路	Gucheng Nanlu
110107003026	八角路	Bajiaolu
110107003028	公园北	Gongyuan bei
110107003029	八角北路	Bajiao Beilu
110107003030	八角北路特钢	Bajiao Beilu Tegang
110107003032	杨庄南区	Yangzhuang Nanqu
110107003034	杨庄中区	Yangzhuang Zhongqu
110107003037	八角南里	Bajiao Nanli
110107003038	地铁古城家园	Ditie Gucheng Jiayuan
110107003039	杨庄北区	Yangzhuang Beiqu
110107003041	黄南苑	Huangnanyuan
110107003042	时代花园	Shidai Huayuan
110107003043	八角景阳东街第一	Bajiao Jingyang Dongjie Diyi
110107003044	八角景阳东街第二	Bajiao Jingyang Dongjie Di'er
110107003045	八角景阳东街第三	Bajiao Jingyang Dongjie Disan
110107003046	体育场南路	Tiyuchang Nanlu
110107003047	杨庄北区第二	Yangzhuang Beiqu Di'er
110107003048	体育场西街	Tiyuchang Xijie

== See also ==
- List of township-level divisions of Beijing
