= Babaoshan Subdistrict =

Babaoshan Subdistrict 八宝山街道
- Subdistrict
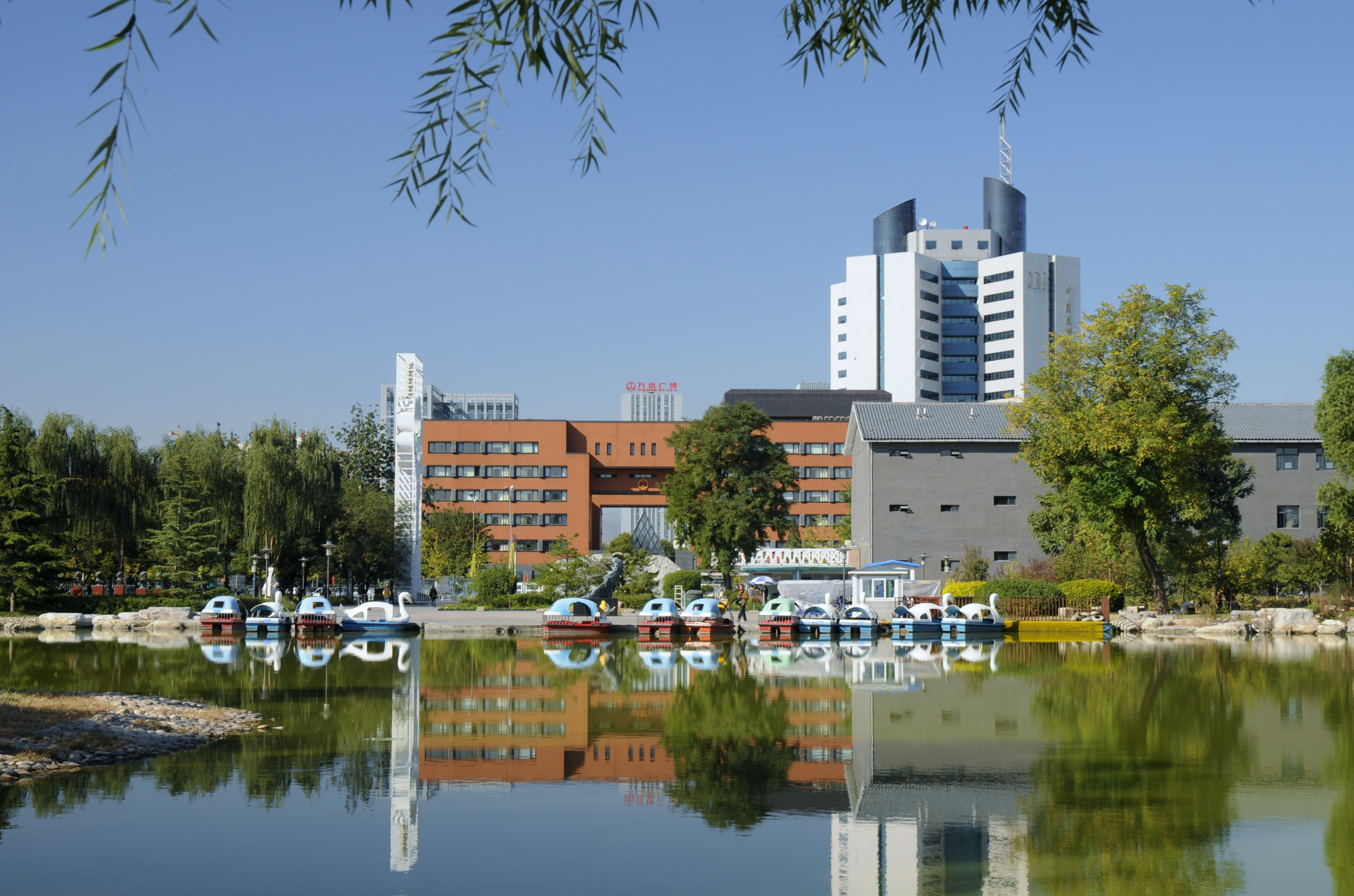
- Beijing International Sculpture Park within the subdistrict, 2011

- Location within Beijing Location within China
- Coordinates: 39°54′01″N 116°13′48″E
- Country: China
- Municipality: Beijing
- District: Shijingshan
- Village-level Divisions: 15 communities

Area
  - Total: 3.93 km^{2} (1.52 sq mi)

Population (2020)
  - Total: 61,211
  - Density: 15,600/km^{2} (40,300/sq mi)
- Time zone: UTC+8 (China Standard)
- Postal code: 100040
- Area code: 010

Babaoshan Subdistrict (Chinese: 八宝山街道; pinyin: Bābǎoshān Jiēdào) is a subdistrict on the southeast corner of Shijingshan District, Beijing, China. It borders Laoshan Subdistrict to the north, Wangshoulu Subdistrict to the east, Liuliqiao Subdistrict and Lugouqiao Subdistrict to the south, and Lugu Subdistrict to the west. As of 2020, it had a total population of 61,211.

This subdistrict was named after Babao Mountain (Chinese: 八宝山; lit. 'Eight Treasures Mountain'), which itself was named so for the 8 types of minerals that the mountain possessed.

== History ==
Babaoshan Subdistrict was converted from Babaoshan Area in August 1963.

== Administrative divisions ==
As of 2021, Babaoshan Subdistrict comprises 15 communities:

Administrative division code	Subdivision names	Name transliteration
110107001003	玉泉路西	Yuquanlu Xi
110107001004	电子科技情报研究所	Dianzi Keji QIngbao Yanjiusuo
110107001005	瑞达	Ruida
110107001006	中铁建设有限公司	Zhongtie Jianshe Youxian Gongsi
110107001010	鲁谷住宅	Lugu Zhuzhai
110107001012	四季园	Sijiyuan
110107001017	永乐东小区北	Yongledong Xiaoqu Bei
110107001019	永乐东小区南	Yongledong Xiaoqu Nan
110107001022	三山园	Sanshanyuan
110107001023	玉泉西里西	Yuquan Xili Xi
110107001024	玉泉西里北	Yuquan Xili Bei
110107001025	玉泉西里中	Yuquan Xili Zhong
110107001026	玉泉西里南	Yuquan Xili Nan
110107001027	沁山水北	Qinshanshui Bei
110107001028	沁山水南	Qinshanshui Nan

== See also ==
- List of township-level divisions of Beijing
