= Fahai =

Fahai (Chinese: 法海) may refer to:

- Fahai (Tang dynasty), Tang-dynasty Chan Buddhist monk, Huineng's disciple and alleged compiler of the Platform Sutra
- Fahai (character), fictional Buddhist monk from The Legend of the White Snake
- Fahai Temple, Buddhist temple in Shijingshan District, Beijing, China

== See also ==
- Fahai Temple Forest Park
