= Jin'anqiao station =

Beijing Subway station

Jin'anqiao 金安桥
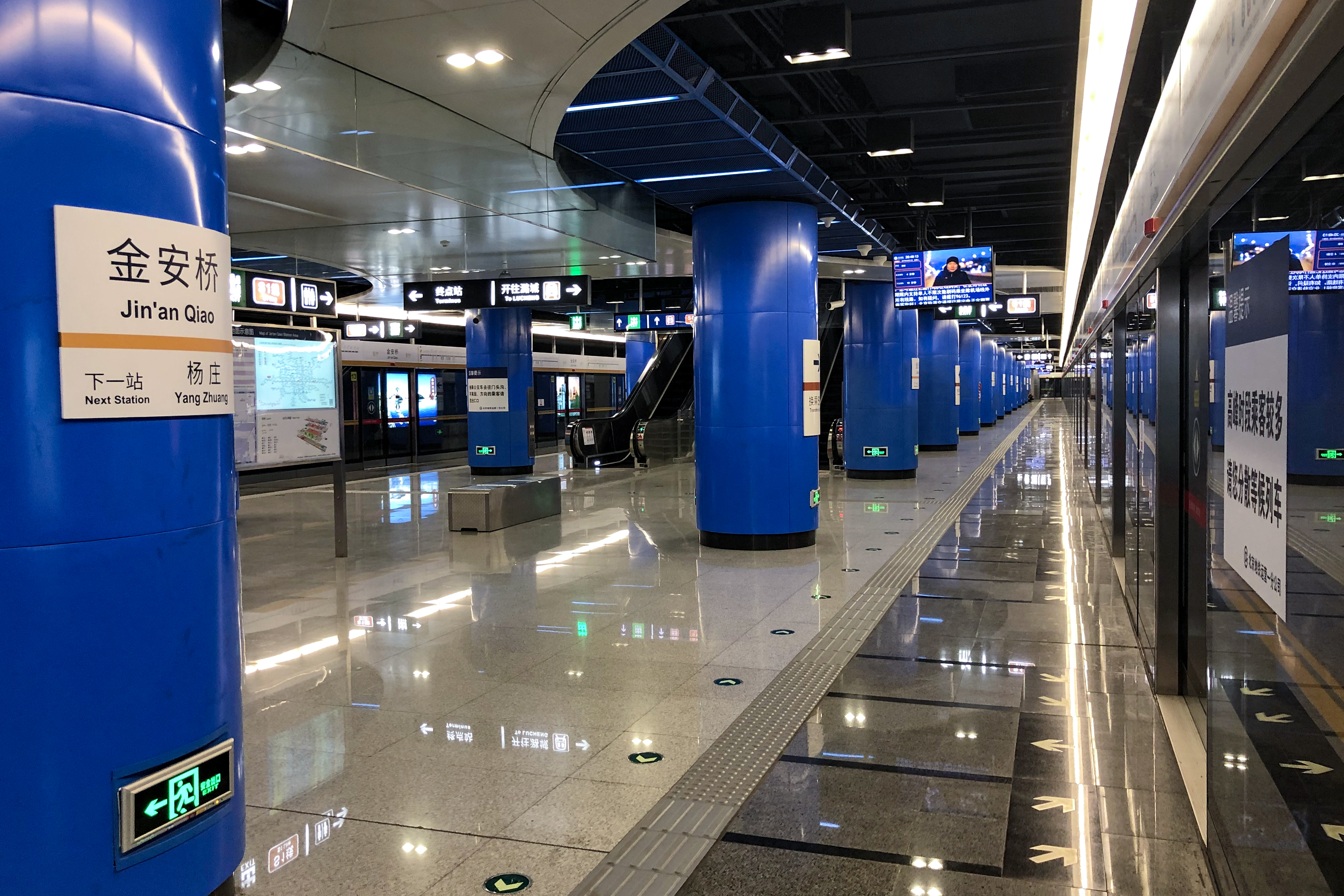
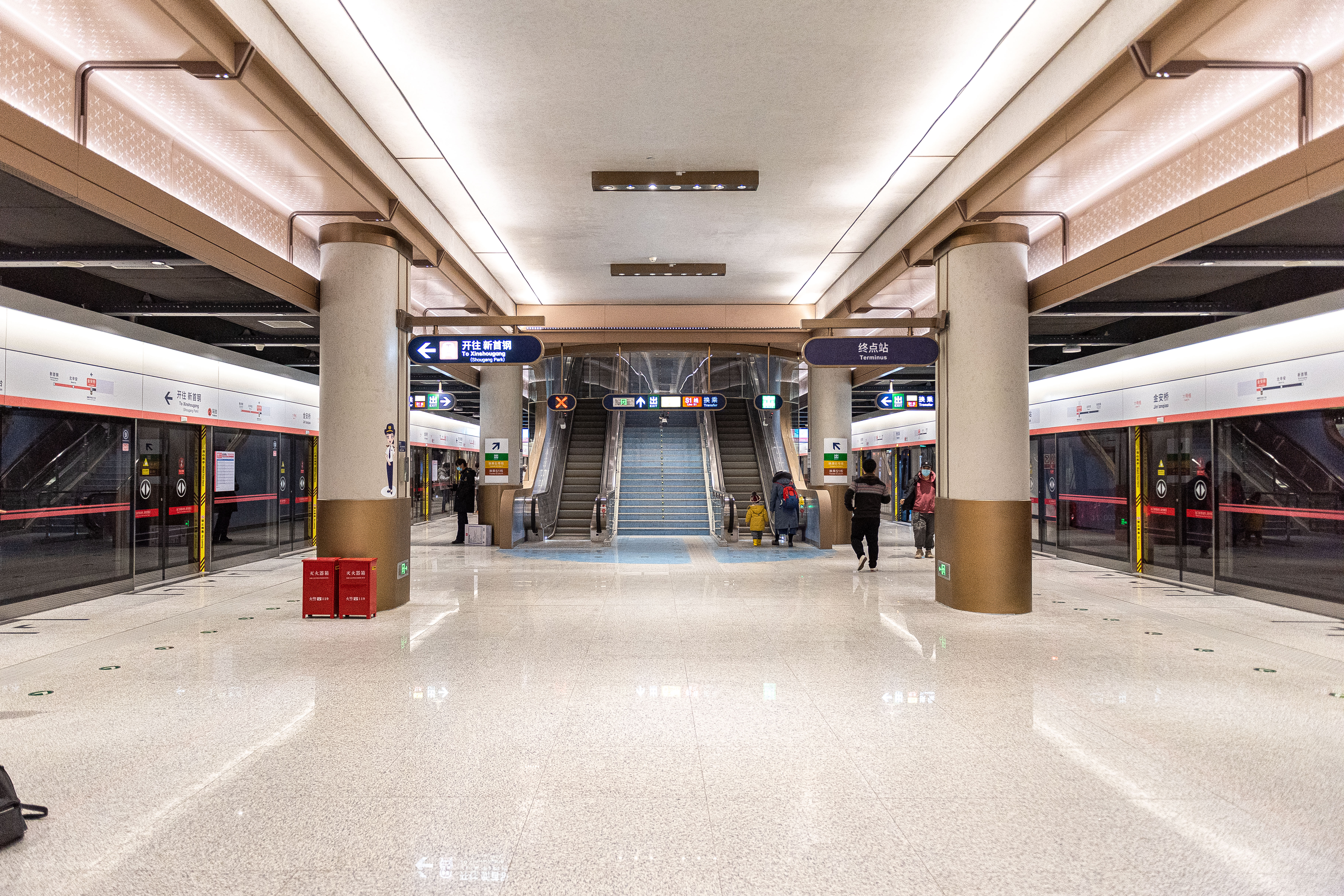
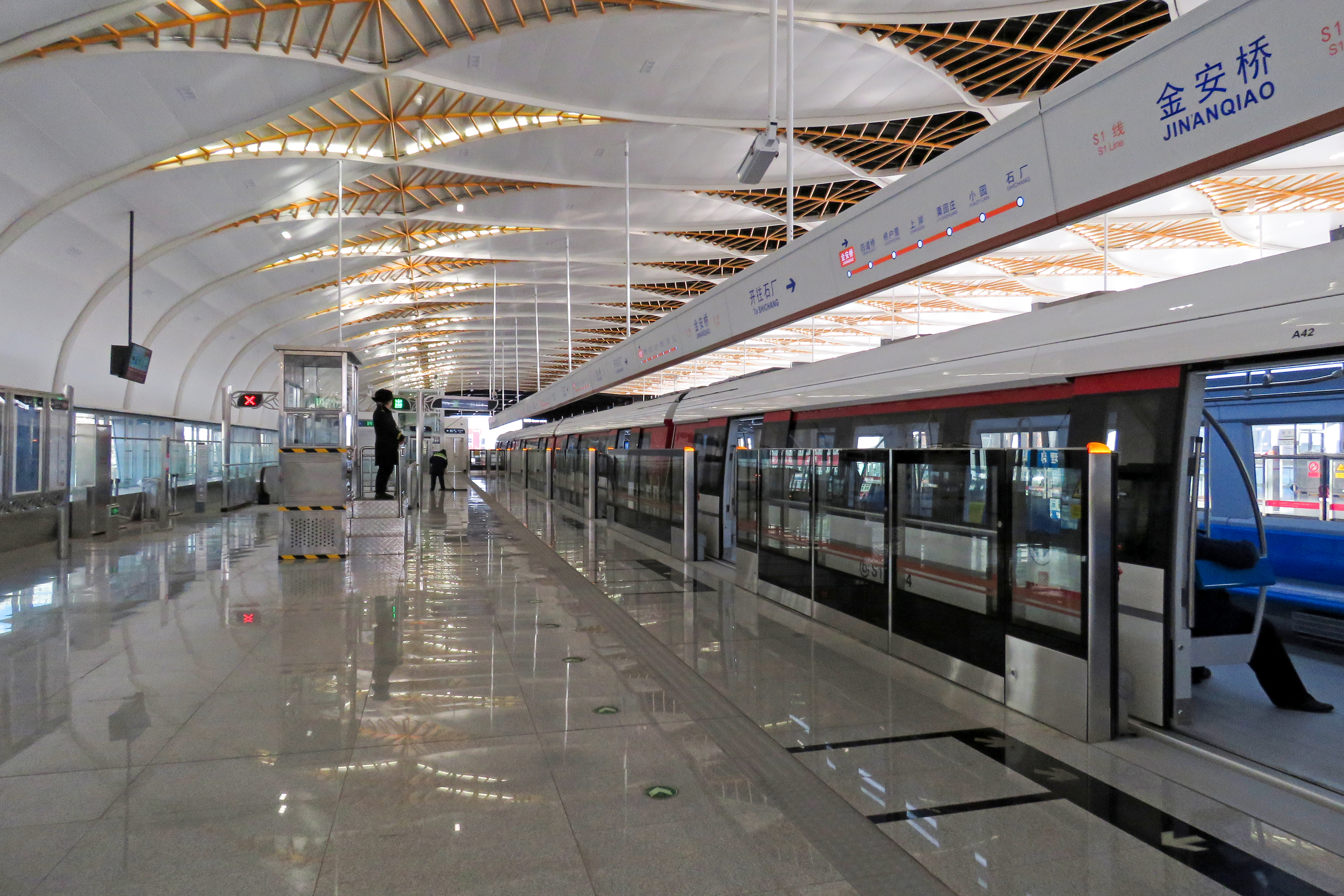
- Line 6 platform Line 11 platform Line S1 platform

General information
- Location: Fushi Road (G109) and Beixin'an Road (北辛安路); Shijingshan District, Beijing; China
- Coordinates: 39°55′20″N 116°09′25″E
- Operator: Beijing Mass Transit Railway Operation Corporation Limited
- Lines: Line 6 Line 11; Line S1
- Platforms: 6 (2 island platforms and 2 side platforms)
- Tracks: 6

Construction
- Structure type: Underground (Line 6 & Line 11); Elevated (Line S1)
- Accessible: Yes

History
- Opened: 30 December 2017; 8 years ago (Line S1); 30 December 2018; 7 years ago (Line 6); 31 December 2021; 4 years ago (Line 11)

Services
Preceding station	Beijing Subway	Following station
Terminus	Line 6	Pingguoyuan towards Luyang
Moshikou Terminus	Line 11	Beixin'an towards Xinshougang (Shougang Park)
Sidao Qiao towards Shichang	Line S1	Pingguoyuan Terminus
Location
- Location within Beijing

Jin'anqiao station (simplified Chinese: 金安桥站; traditional Chinese: 金安橋站; pinyin: Jīn'ānqiáo zhàn, also known as JIN'ANQIAO station or Jin'an Qiao station) is an interchange station on Line 6, Line 11 and Line S1 of the Beijing Subway.

The Line S1 station opened on 30 December 2017, and was the eastern terminus of Line S1 until the opening of Pingguoyuan on 31 December 2021. The Line 6 station was opened on 30 December 2018, and is the western terminus of Line 6. The Line 11 station opened on 31 December 2021, and was the northern terminus of Line 11 until the opening of Moshikou on 30 December 2023.

The Line 6 station and the Line 11 station are underground. The Line S1 station is elevated.

== Station layout ==
The line 6 station has an underground island platform. The line 11 station has an underground island platform. The Line S1 station has 2 elevated side platforms.

== Exits ==
There are 9 exits, lettered A, B, C, D, E, F, H, J and K. Exits A, B, C, F, H and J are accessible.

== Gallery ==
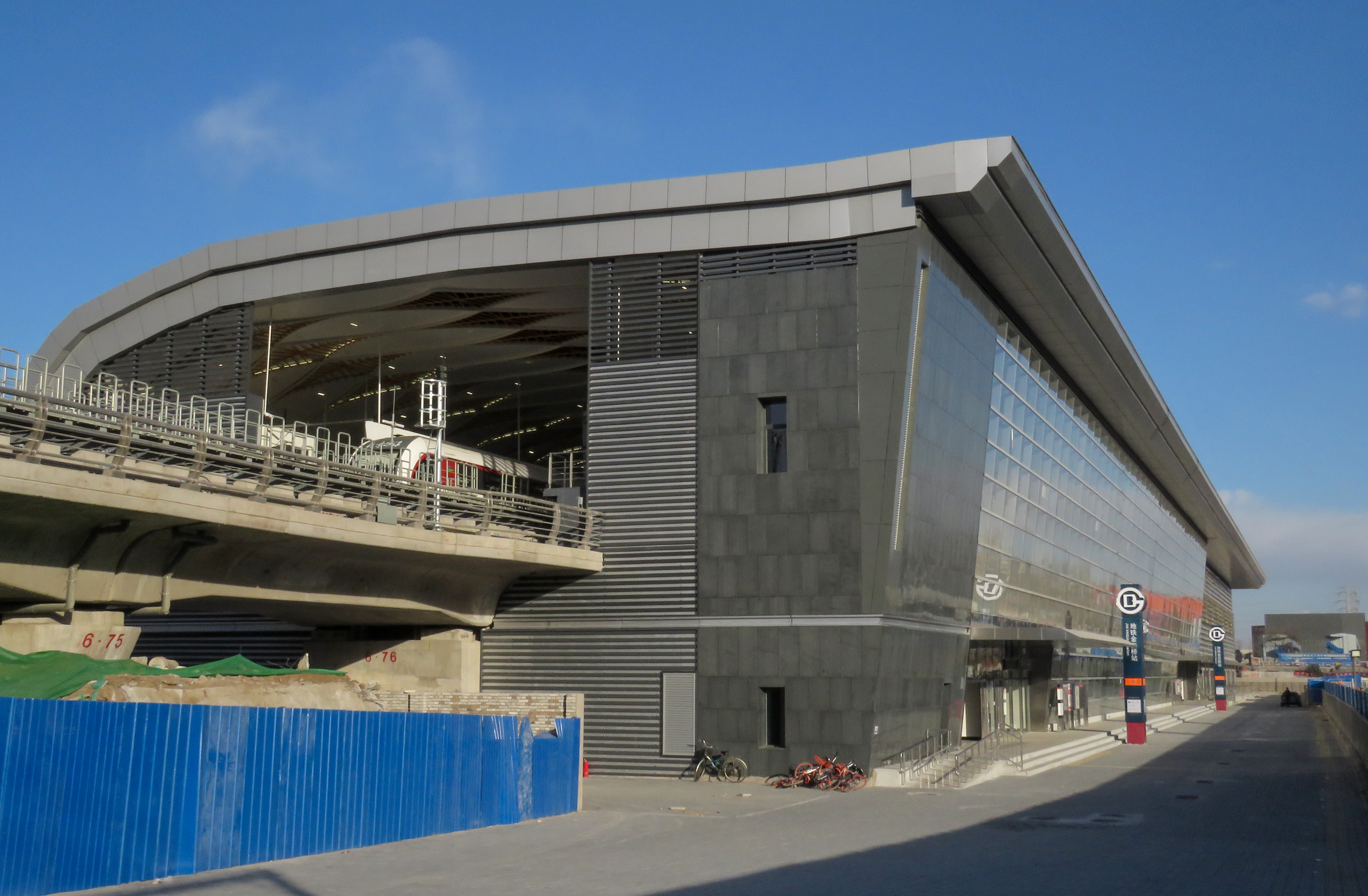
Line S1.exterior

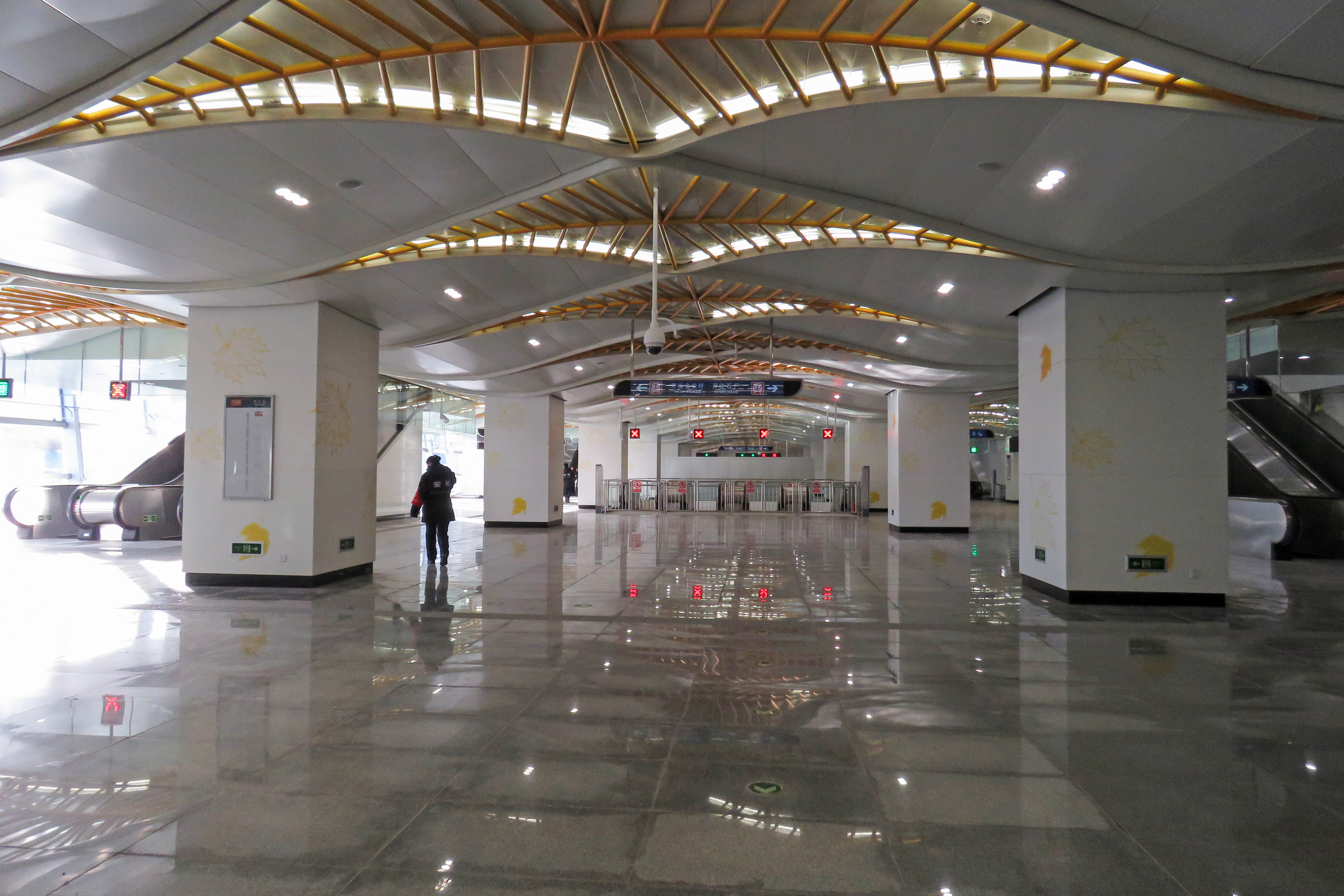
Line S1 concourse

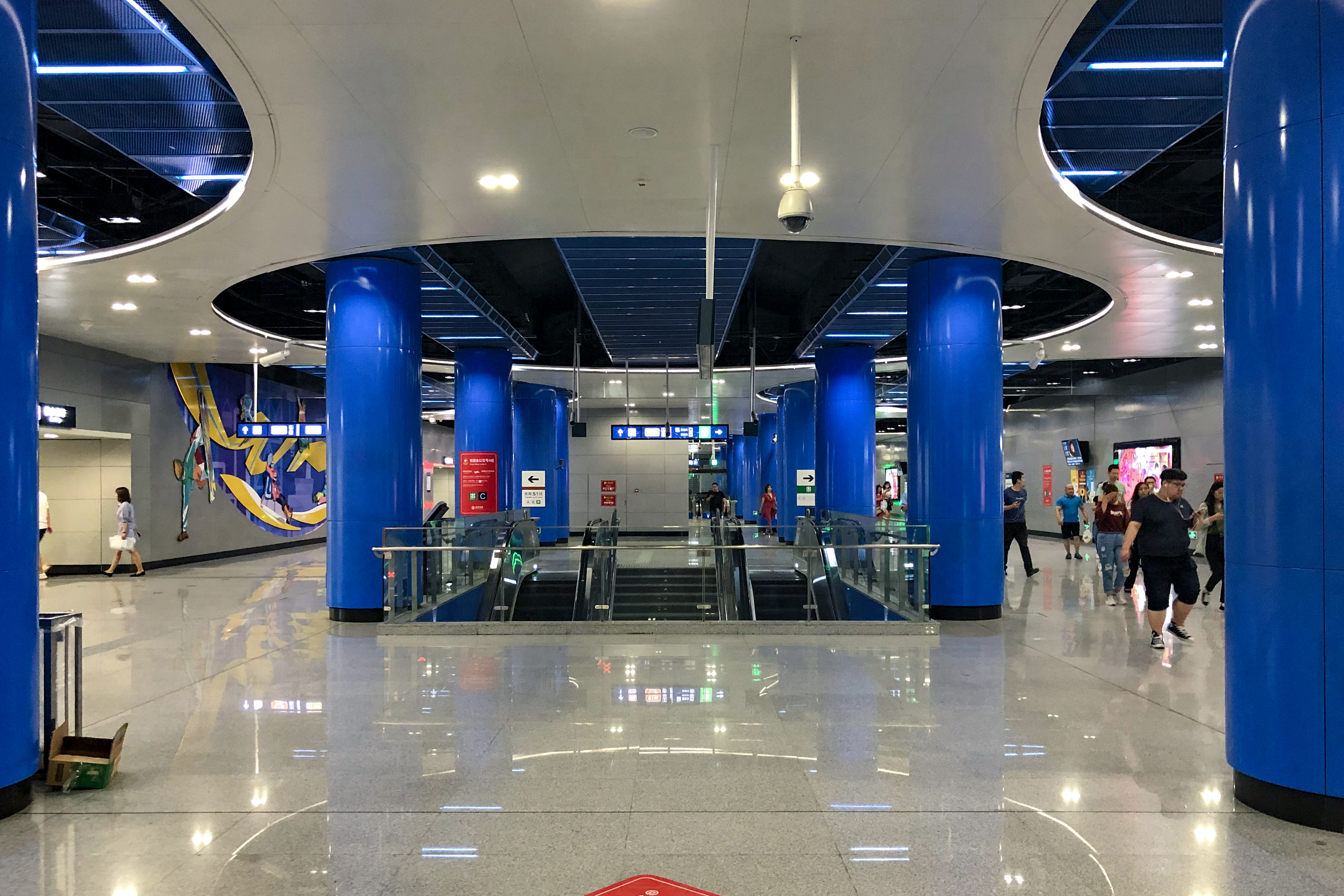
Line 6 concourse

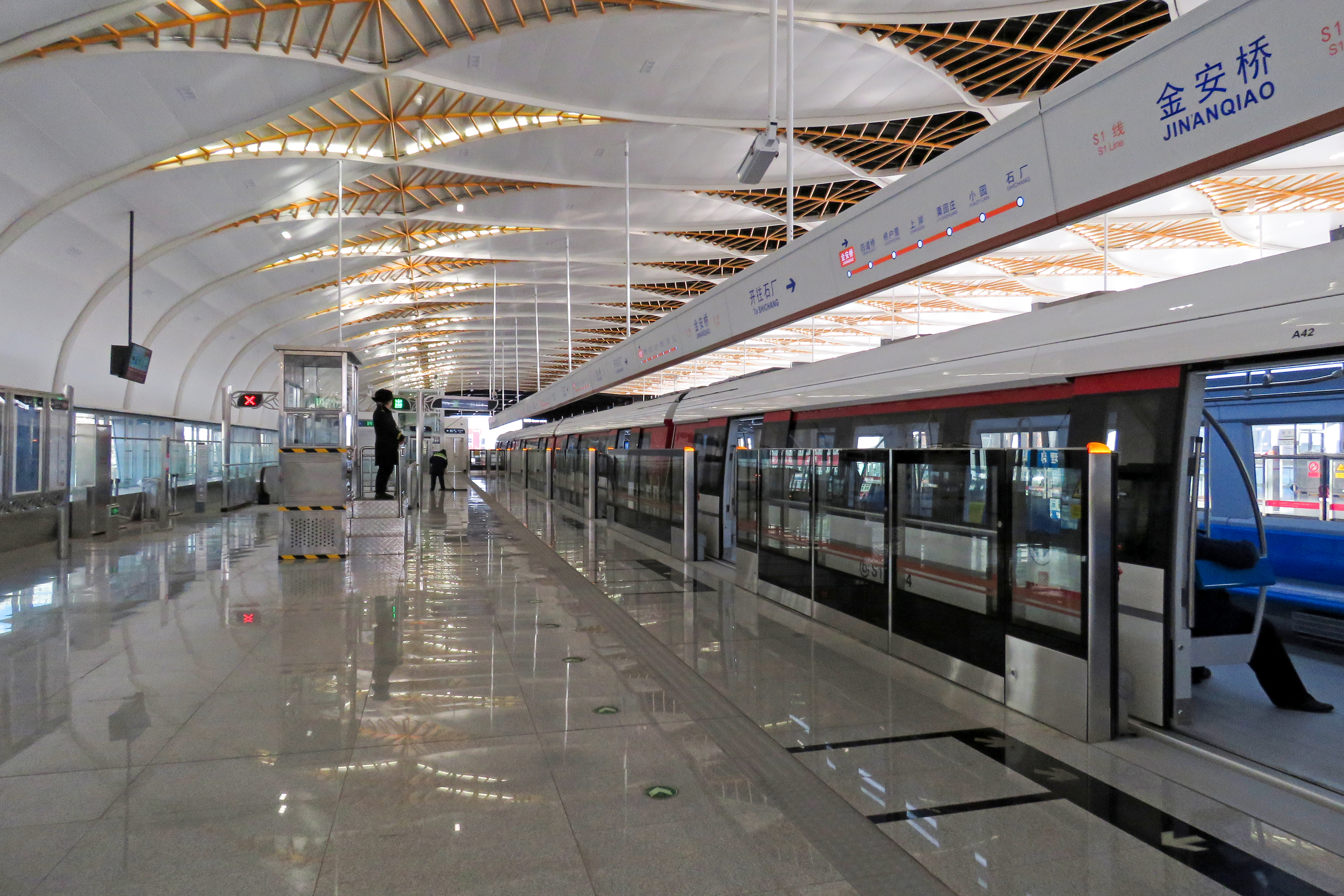
Line S1 westbound platform

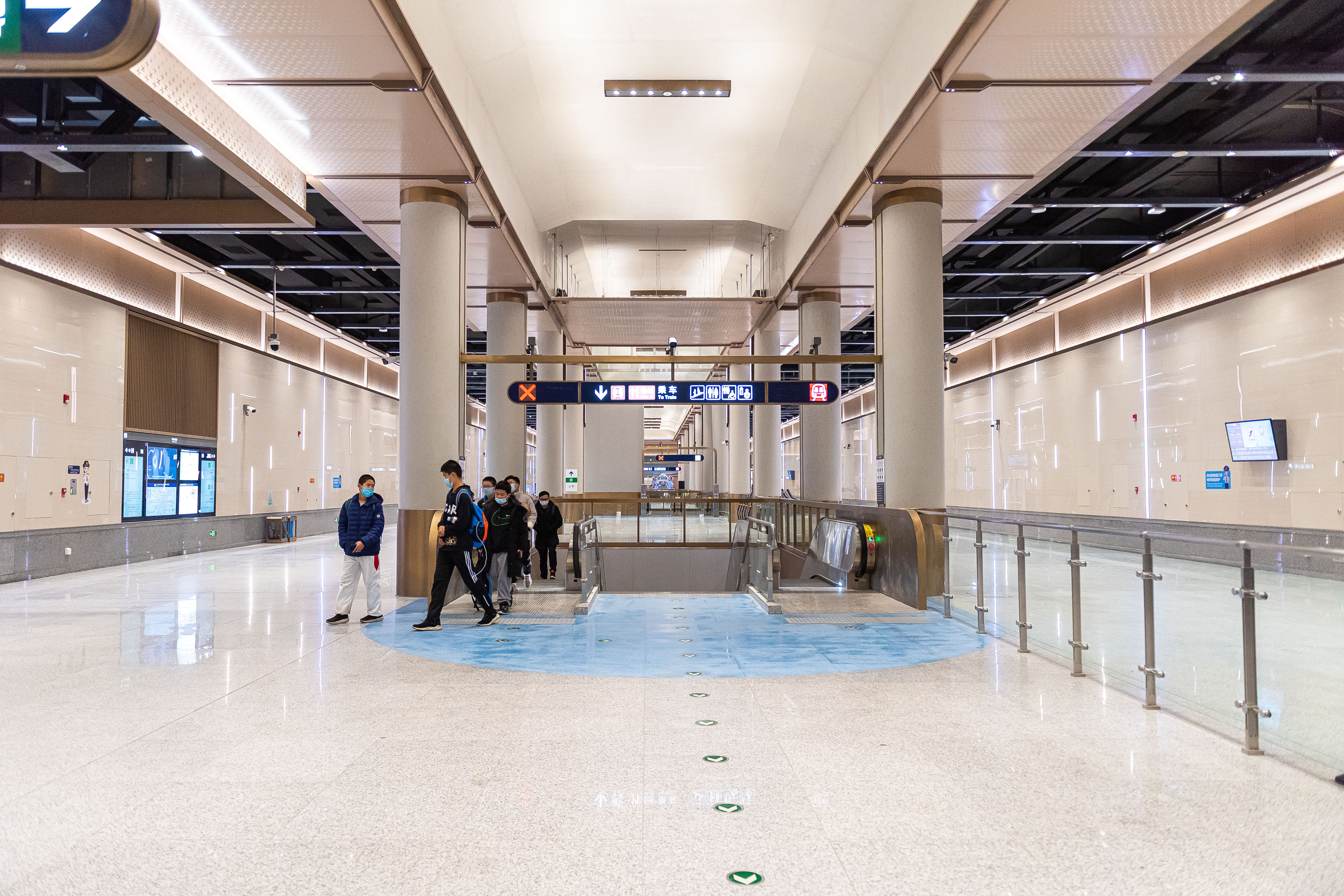
Line 11 concourse
