= Wulituo Subdistrict =

Wulituo Subdistrict 五里坨街道
- Subdistrict
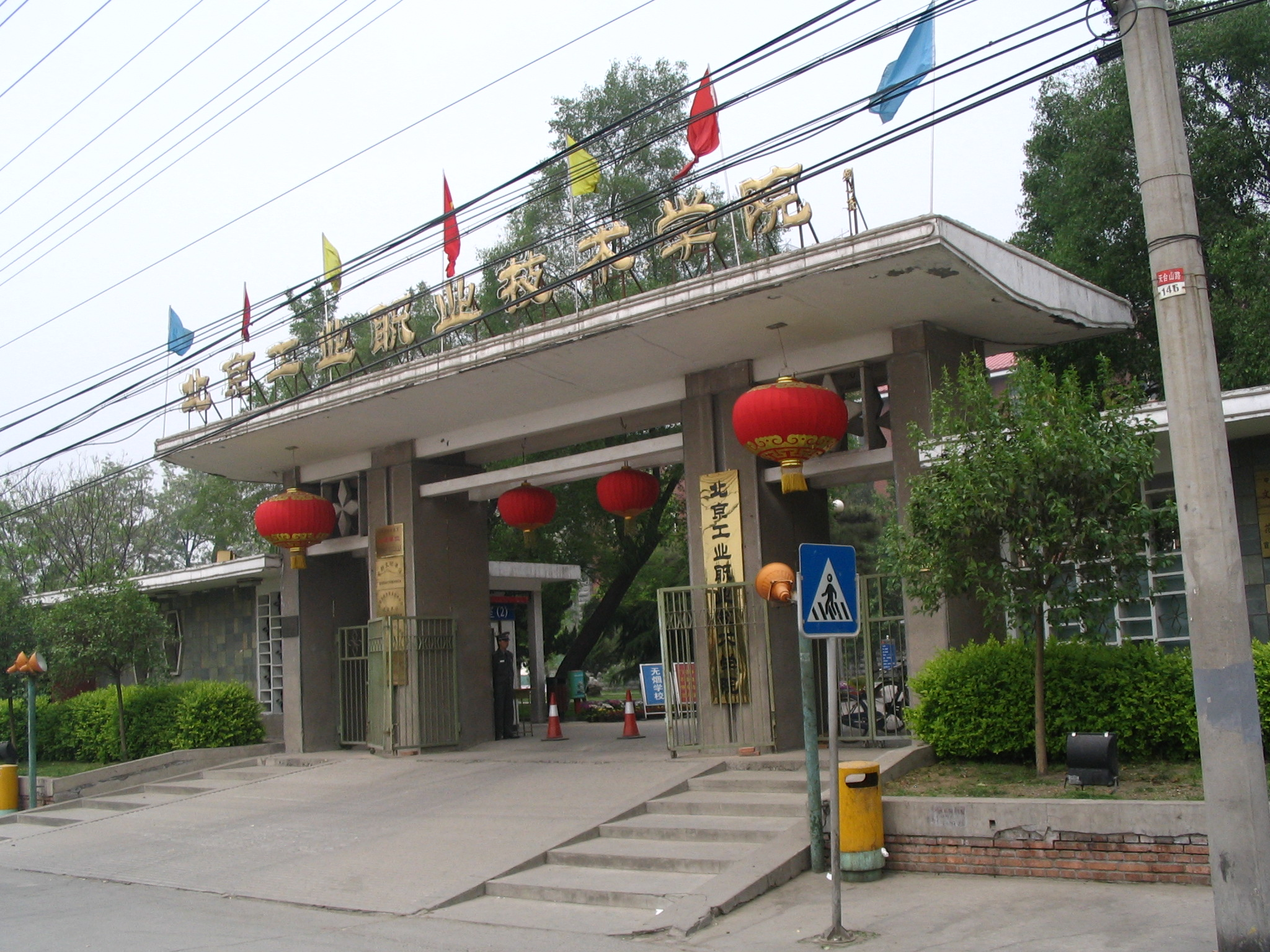
- Beijing Career School of Industrial Techniques on the southwest of the subdistrict, 2008

- Location within Beijing Location within China
- Coordinates: 39°57′17″N 116°07′12″E
- Country: China
- Municipality: Beijing
- District: Shijingshan
- Village-level Divisions: 15 communities

Area
  - Total: 24.46 km^{2} (9.44 sq mi)

Population (2020)
  - Total: 41,248
  - Density: 1,686/km^{2} (4,368/sq mi)
- Time zone: UTC+8 (China Standard)
- Postal code: 100042
- Area code: 010

Wulituo Subdistrict (Chinese: 五里坨街道; pinyin: Wǔlǐtuó Jiēdào) is a subdistrict situated on the northwestern part of Shijingshan District, Beijing, China. It shares border with Junzhuang Town and Xiangshan Subdistrict to the north, Pingguoyuan Subdistrict and Sijiqing Township to the east, Jindingjie and Guangning Subdistricts to the south, as well as Chengzi Subdistrict and Longquan Township to the west. Its population was 41,248 as of 2020.

The subdistrict was first instituted in 1963, and was named after Wulituo (Chinese: 五里坨; lit. 'Five Miles Lump') village that used to exist within its border.

== Administrative Divisions ==
In 2021, Wulituo Subdistrict covered 15 communities within its borders, all of which are listed as follows:

Administrative division code	Subdivision names	Name transliteration
110107010001	陆军机关军营	Lujun Jiguan Junying
110107010003	黑石头	Heishitou
110107010004	西山机械厂	Xishan Jixiechang
110107010006	高井	Gaojing
110107010011	隆恩寺	Long'ensi
110107010013	东街	Dongjie
110107010015	红卫路	Hongweilu
110107010016	南宫	Nangong
110107010017	隆恩寺新区	Long'ensi Xinqu
110107010018	天翠阳光第一	Tiancui Yangguang Diyi
110107010019	天翠阳光第二	Tiancui Yangguang Di'er
110107010020	天翠阳光第三	Tiancui Yangguang Disan
110107010021	隆恩颐园	Long'en Yiyuan
110107010022	南宫嘉园	Nangong Jiayuan
110107010023	京西景园	Jingxi Jingyuan

== See also ==
- List of township-level divisions of Beijing
