= Beixin'an station =

Beijing Subway station

Beixin'an 北辛安
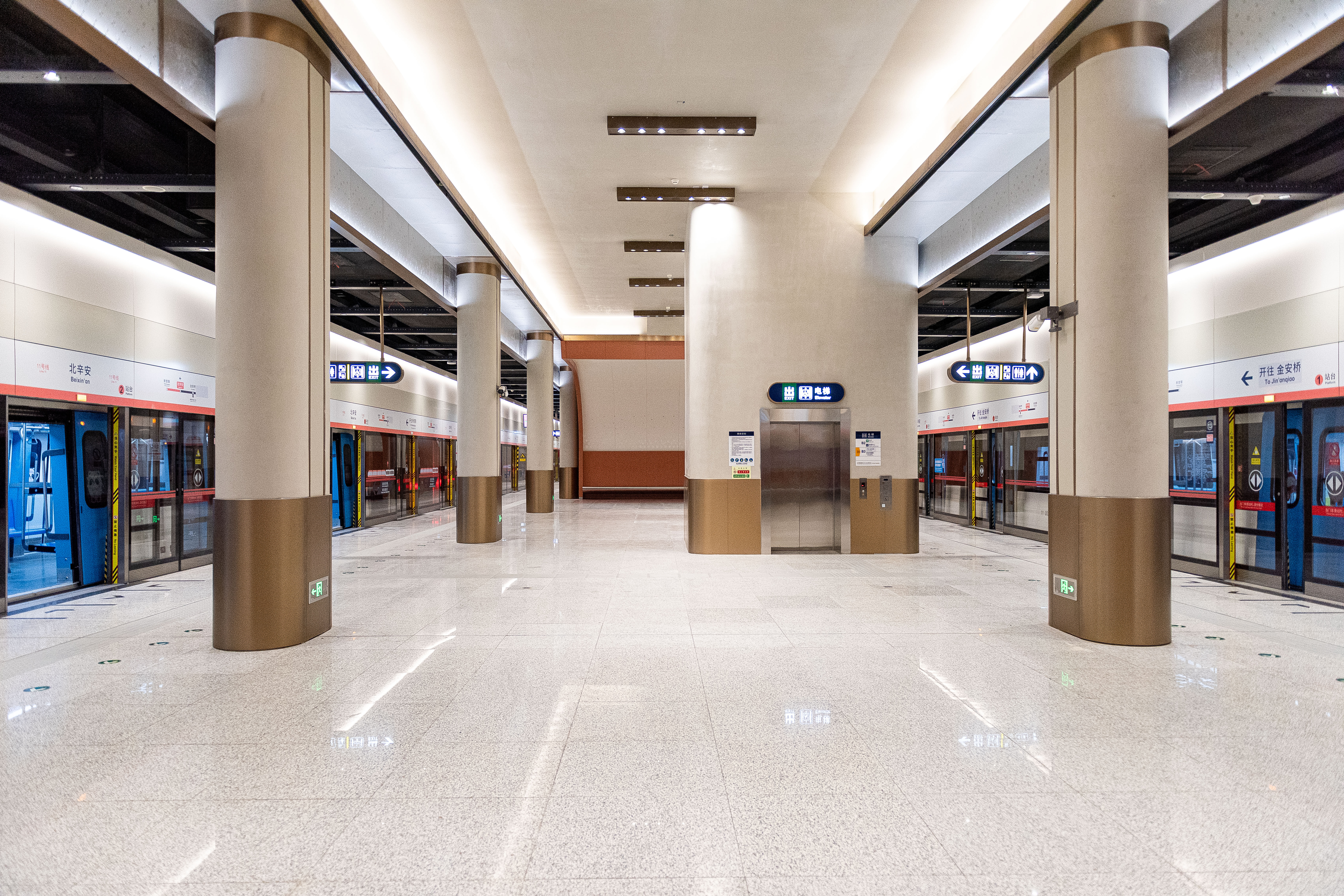

General information
- Location: Shijingshan District, Beijing; China
- Coordinates: 39.913424°N 116.158449°E
- Operator: Beijing Mass Transit Railway Operation Corporation Limited
- Line: Line 11
- Platforms: 2 (1 island platform)
- Tracks: 2

Construction
- Structure type: Underground
- Accessible: Yes

History
- Opened: December 31, 2021

Services
Preceding station	Beijing Subway	Following station
Jin'anqiao towards Moshikou	Line 11	Xinshougang (Shougang Park) Terminus
Location

Beixin'an station (Chinese: 北辛安站; pinyin: Běixīn'ān Zhàn) is a subway station on Line 11 of the Beijing Subway. The station opened on December 31, 2021.

== Platform layout ==
The station has an underground island platform.

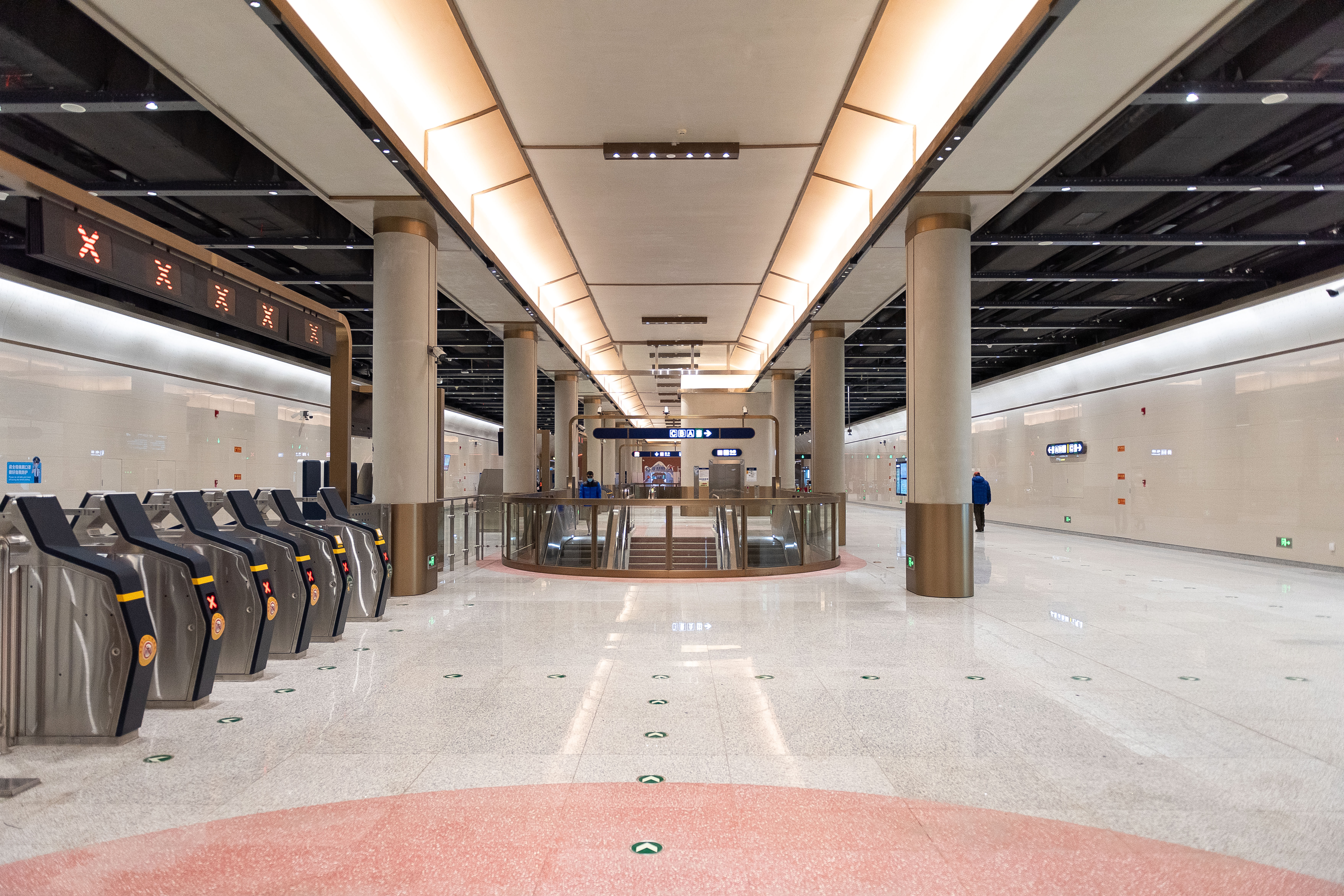
Concourse

== Exits ==
There are 3 exits, lettered A, B1 and C. Exit C is accessible.
