= Line 11 (Beijing Subway) =

Metro line in Beijing, China

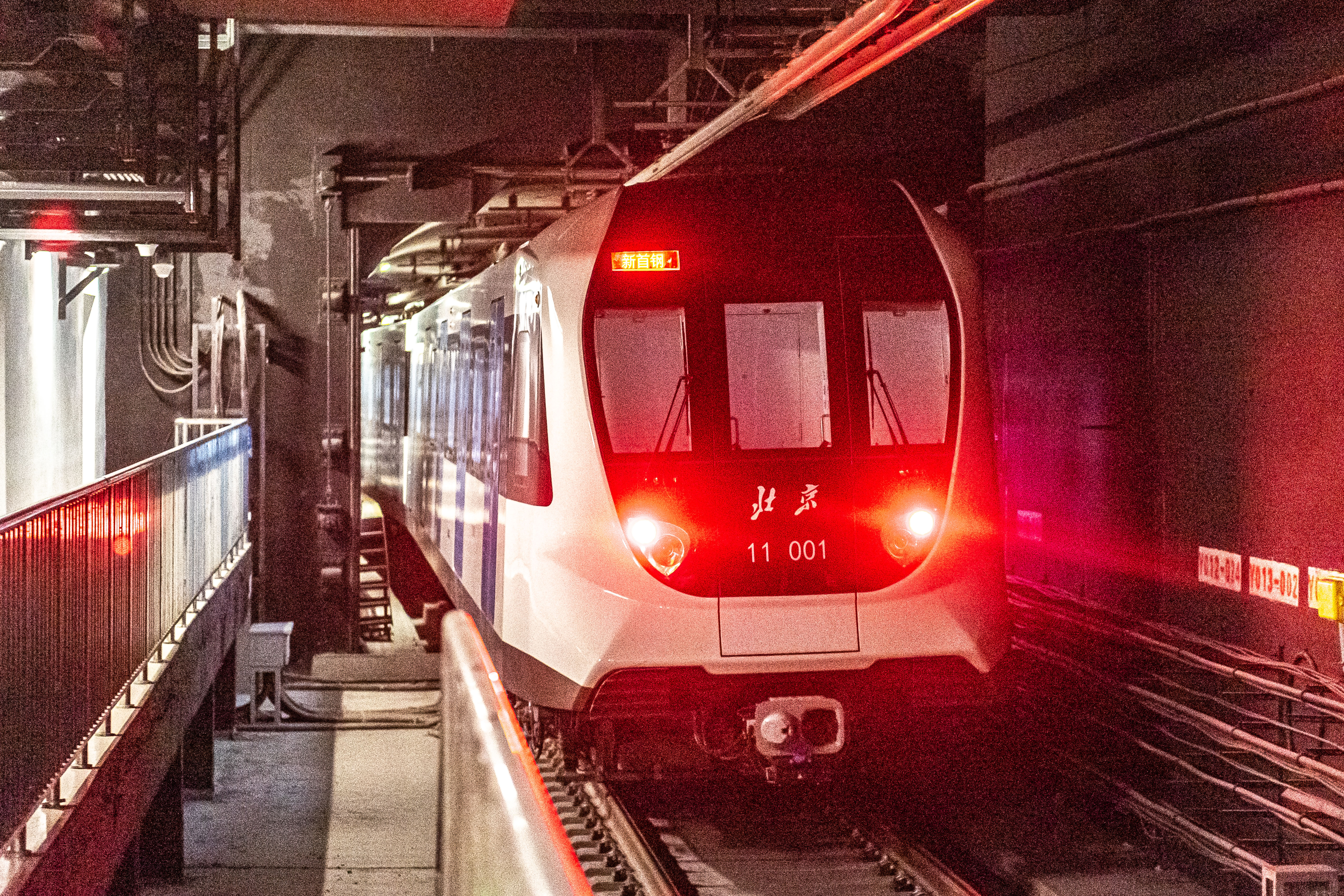
- Line 11 train leaving Jin'anqiao station

Overview
- Other name(s): M11 (planned name); Winter Olympic Branch Line (nickname for Phase 1)
- Status: Operational
- Termini: Moshikou; Xinshougang (Shougang Park)
- Stations: 4

Service
- Type: Rapid transit
- System: Beijing Subway
- Depot: None (trains temporary store at zig zag tracks near Xinshougang station)
- Rolling stock: Type A, 4-car / 6-car
- Daily ridership: 6,700 (2024 Avg.)

History
- Opened: 31 December 2021; 4 years ago

Technical
- Line length: 4.2 km (2.6 mi)
- Track gauge: 1,435 mm (4 ft 8 1/2 in)
- Operating speed: 100 km/h (62 mph)

Line 11 of the Beijing Subway (Chinese: 北京地铁11号线; pinyin: běijīng dìtiě shíyī hàoxiàn) is a rapid transit line of the Beijing Subway. The line opened between Jin'anqiao and Xinshougang (Shougang Park) on December 31, 2021, and between Jin'anqiao and Moshikou on December 30, 2023. Line 11's color is grapefruit.

== Opening timeline ==
Segment	Commencement	Length	Station(s)	Name
Jin'anqiao — Shougang Park	31 December 2021	1.5 km (0.93 mi)	3	Phase 1
Moshikou — Jin'anqiao	30 December 2023	1.4 km (0.87 mi)	1	Phase 1

== Stations ==
=== Phase 1 ===
All stations are in Shijingshan.

Station Name		Connections	Nearby Bus Stops	Distance km	
English	Chinese	Connections	Nearby Bus Stops	Distance km	
Moshikou	模式口		336 358 489 597 932 941 961 972 977 快速直达专线135	0.000	0.000
Jin'anqiao	金安桥	6 S1	325 336 337 358 370 396 472 489 502 892 920 921 929 931 932 941 941快 948 959 961 977 977快 981 BRT4(快速公交4) 快速直达专线135 快速直达专线142 快速直达专线150 M3 M4 M5 M6 M7 M11 M16 M20 M22 专61 专110 专148 专198	1.366	1.366
Beixin'an	北辛安		337 941 959 专61 专152 专198	0.850	2.216
Xinshougang (Shougang Park)	新首钢		1 992 专108 专218	0.689	2.905

=== Phase 2 ===
- Under Planning.
- There are suggestions to add an infill station between Qingta and Lianhua Qiao stations on Phase 2 of Line 11. In July 2024, the infill station, Wanfeng Lu, was confirmed in official news.
- Distance: 18.3 km (11.4 mi), all stations are underground.
- The planned new depot located in Shijingshan District, with all main buildings are underground. The total construction area is approximately 212,000 square meters, of which approximately 10,000 square meters are overground. The investment is approximately 3.29 billion RMB.

Station Name		Connections	Nearby Bus Stops	Distance km
English	Chinese	Connections	Nearby Bus Stops	Distance km
Xingcai	型材			
Guoluchang Nanlu	锅炉厂南路			
Yamenkouxi (old) (Note: As the interchange station between Line 11 Phase 2 and Line 1 Branch section, which was called Tiyuchang Nanjie (体育场南街), is scheduled to name as Yamenkouxi, the former Yamenkouxi station will adopt another new name which is yet to be announced.)	衙门口西（旧）			
Yamenkouxi	衙门口西	1 (Branch) (U/C)		
Yamenkoudong	衙门口东			
Lugu Dajie	鲁谷大街			
Wujiacun	吴家村			
Xiaowayao	小瓦窑			
Qingta	青塔			
Wanfeng Lu	万丰路			
Lianhua Qiao	莲花桥	10		
Beijing West railway station	北京西站	7 9 BXP		
Maliandao	马连道			
Lize Shangwuqu	丽泽商务区	14 16; Daxing Airport (U/C)		

== History ==
=== Old planning ===
In 2006, Line 11 was originally designed as an L-shaped line from Wanliu to Dahongmen, which together with the L-shaped Line 10, form a subway ring route. After Line 10 Phase II took over the entire ring route, Line 11 was displaced.

In January 2010, the government of Shijingshan District disclosed plans for a Line 11 in western Beijing that would traverse the Shougang (Beijing Capital Steel) complex and intersect with Lines 4 and 16.

=== Phase 1 ===
Construction started on November 13, 2019. The western section (Phase 1) of Line 11 (Moshikou station — Xinshougang station), also known as "Winter Olympic Branch Line", is 4.2 km (2.6 mi) in length with 4 stations. It is fully underground.

Jin'anqiao, Beixin'an and Xinshougang (Shougang Park) stations opened on December 31, 2021. Moshikou station opened on December 30, 2023.

=== Phase 2 ===
According to the information released on January 11, 2022, Phase II of Line 11 to Lize Shangwuqu and Yangqiao is included in the "Beijing Rail Transit Phase III Construction Plan". In 8 July 2022, an EIA document regarding Phase III construction of Beijing rail transport system (2022–2027) confirmed that it will be 23.8 km (14.8 mi) long with 17 stations.

The section between Lize Shangwuqu and Yangqiao was not approved by the NDRC and removed from the short-term plan in 2023. On 8 July 2024, a tender announcement modified phase 2 of line 11 to be 17.4 km (10.8 mi) with 14 stations. It was announced that Yamenkoudong, Wujiacun, Xiaowayao, Wanfenglu, Lianhuaqiao, Maliandao, Lize Shangwuqu and Tiyuchang Nanjie (now Yamenkouxi) stations will start construction.
