= Dongguantou station =

Future Beijing Subway station

Dongguantou 东管头
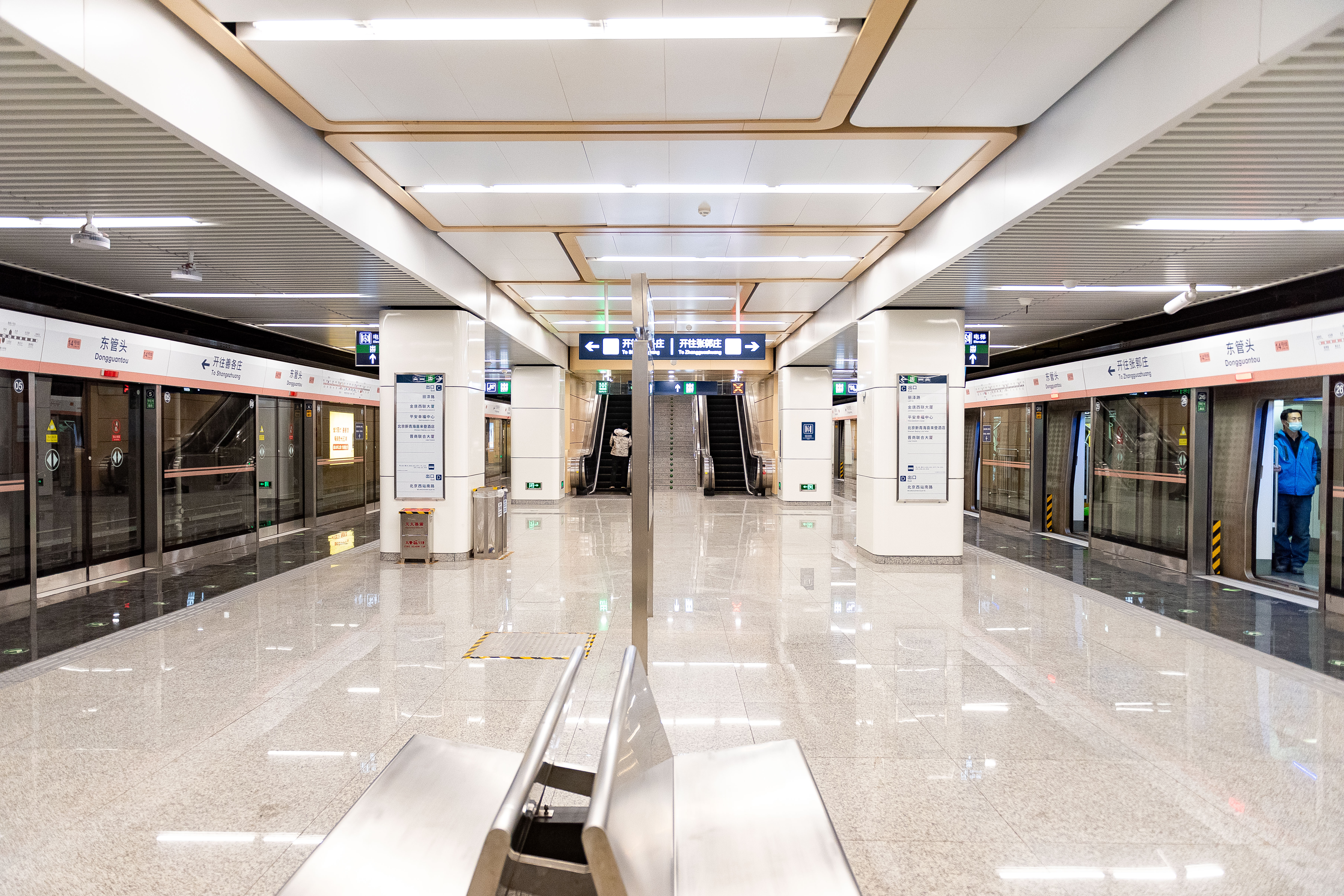
- Platform

General information
- Location: Intersection of Beijingxizhan South Road (北京西站南路) and Lize Road (丽泽路), Fengtai District, Beijing; China
- Coordinates: 39.86616°N 116.31469°E
- Operator: Beijing MTR Corporation Limited
- Line: Line 14
- Platforms: 2 (1 island platform)
- Tracks: 2

Construction
- Structure type: Underground
- Accessible: Yes

History
- Opened: December 31, 2021

Services
Preceding station	Beijing Subway	Following station
Xiju towards Zhangguozhuang	Line 14	Lize Shangwuqu towards Shangezhuang
Location

Dongguantou station (Chinese: 东管头站; pinyin: Dōngguǎntóu zhàn) is a station on Line 14 of the Beijing Subway. The station opened on December 31, 2021.

== See also ==
- Dongguantou Nan station on Line 16 and Fangshan line
