= Lize Shangwuqu station =

Beijing Subway interchange station

Lize Shangwuqu 丽泽商务区
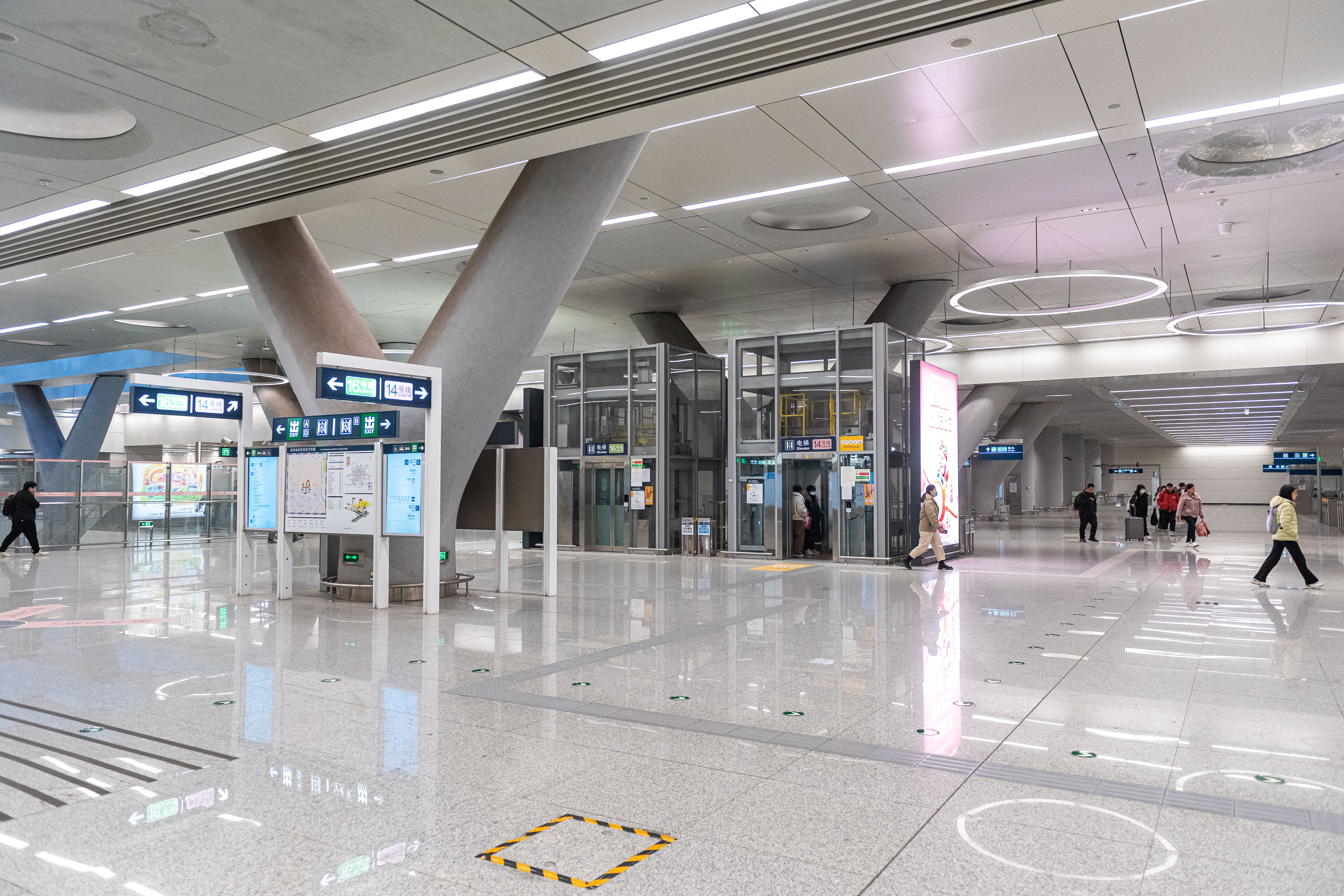
- Line 14 & 16 concourse

General information
- Location: Lize Road and Jinze East Road; Taipingqiao Subdistrict, Fengtai District, Beijing; China
- Coordinates: 39°52′05″N 116°20′10″E
- Operator: Beijing MTR Corporation Limited
- Lines: Line 14; Line 16; Daxing Airport Express (2027)
- Platforms: 4 (2 island platforms)
- Tracks: 4

Construction
- Structure type: Underground
- Accessible: Yes

History
- Opened: Line 14: December 31, 2021; 4 years ago; Line 16: January 19, 2025; 19 months ago; Daxing Airport Express: 2027 (expected)

Services
Preceding station	Beijing Subway	Following station
Dongguantou towards Zhangguozhuang	Line 14	Caihuying towards Shangezhuang
Honglian Nanlu towards Bei'anhe	Line 16	Dongguantounan towards Wanpingcheng
Future services
Terminus	Daxing Airport Express Opening 2027	Caoqiao towards Daxing Airport
Location
- Location within Beijing

Lize Shangwuqu station (simplified Chinese: 丽泽商务区站; traditional Chinese: 麗澤商務區站; pinyin: Lìzé Shāngwùqū zhàn; lit. 'Lize Business District station') is a station on Lines 14 and 16 of the Beijing Subway, located in Fengtai District. A Daxing Airport Express platform is expected to open at the station in 2027, as part of the lines' northern extension, while Line 11 is also planned to be extended to the station and beyond at some point in future.

== Opening time ==
Line 14 (middle section): December 31, 2021

Line 16 (southern section): January 19, 2025

Daxing Airport Express (northern extension): expected to open in 2027

== Location ==
The station is located at the intersection of the east-west Lize Road (丽泽路), which Line 14 runs parallel to, and the north-south Jinze East Road (金泽东路), which Line 16 run parallel to. A number of exits are located in and around Leeza SOHO.

== Station layout ==
Both the line 14 and line 16 stations have underground island platforms. The Daxing Airport Express station will feature a city terminal which provides in-town check-in and baggage drop services.

== Exits ==
There are 3 exits in operation: A, B and D.

== Gallery ==
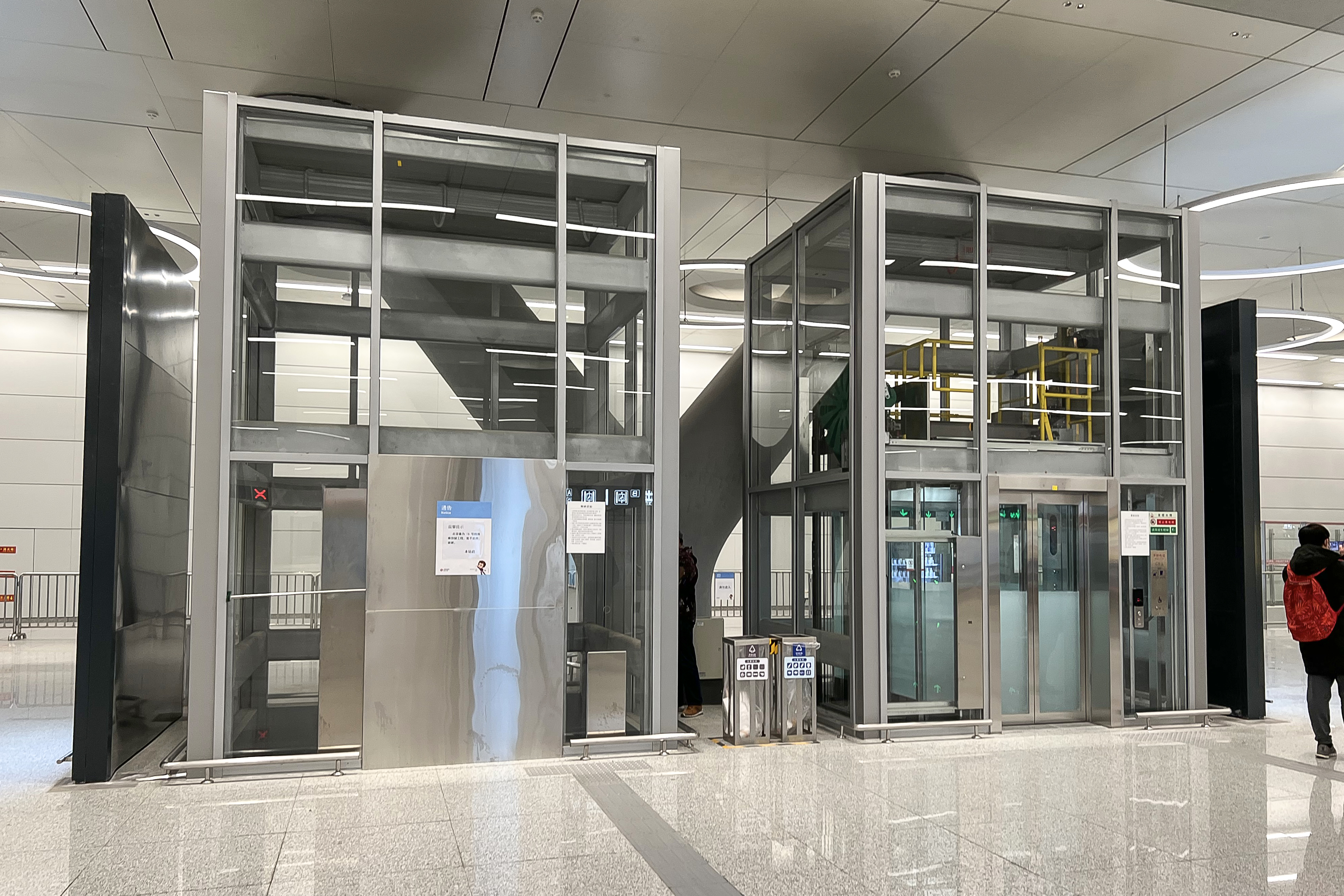
Lifts to line 14 platform from concourse

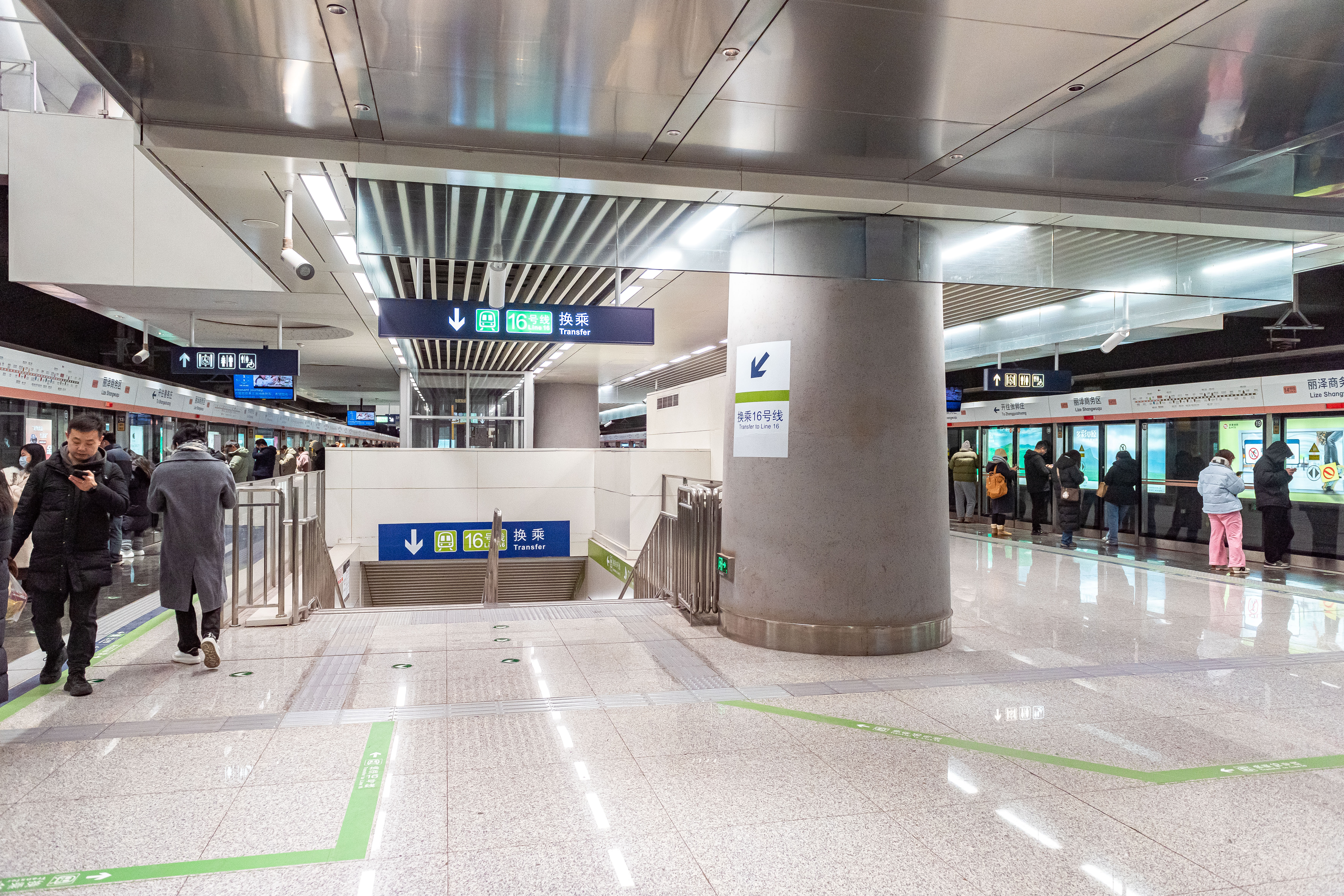
Line 14 platform

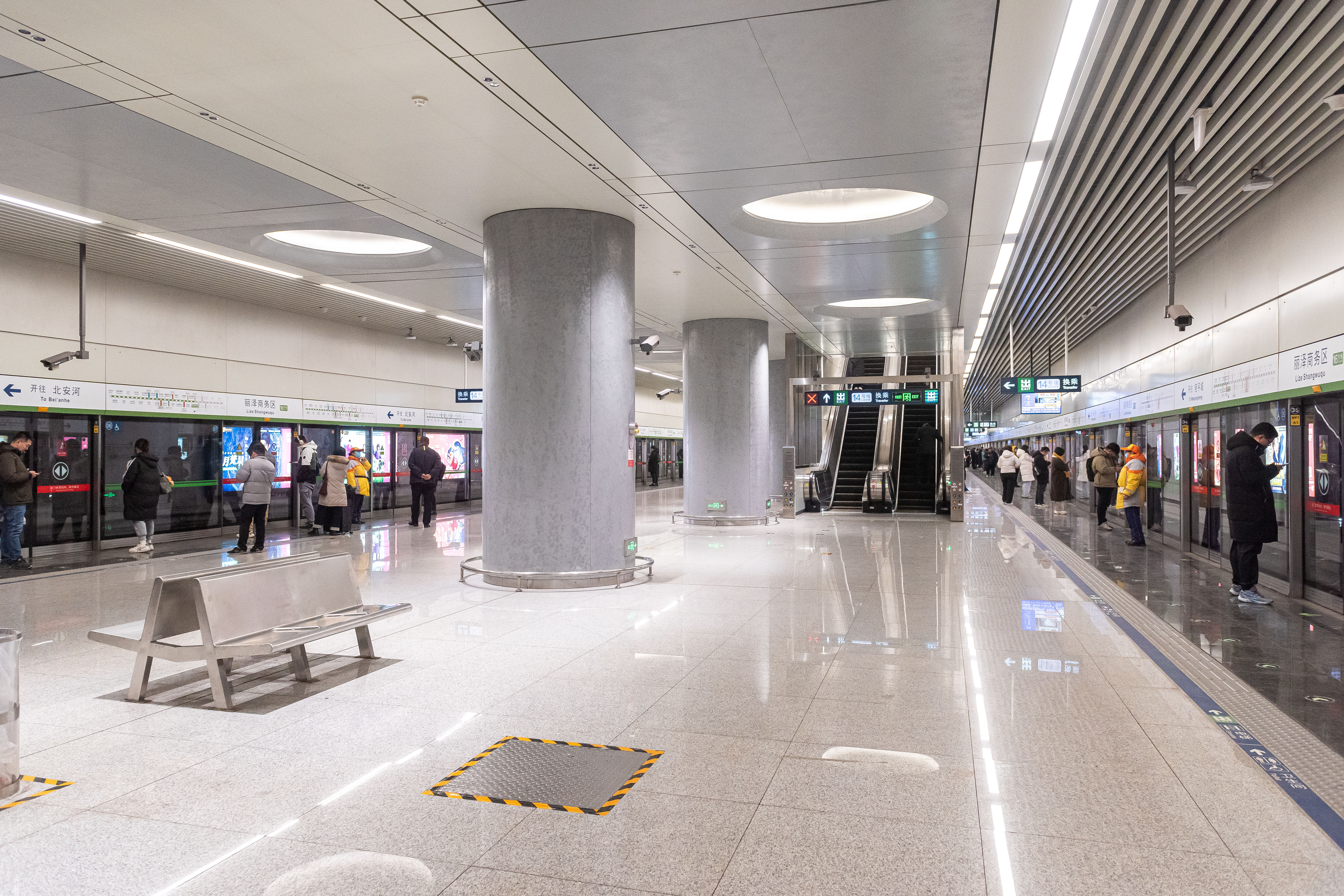
Line 16 platform

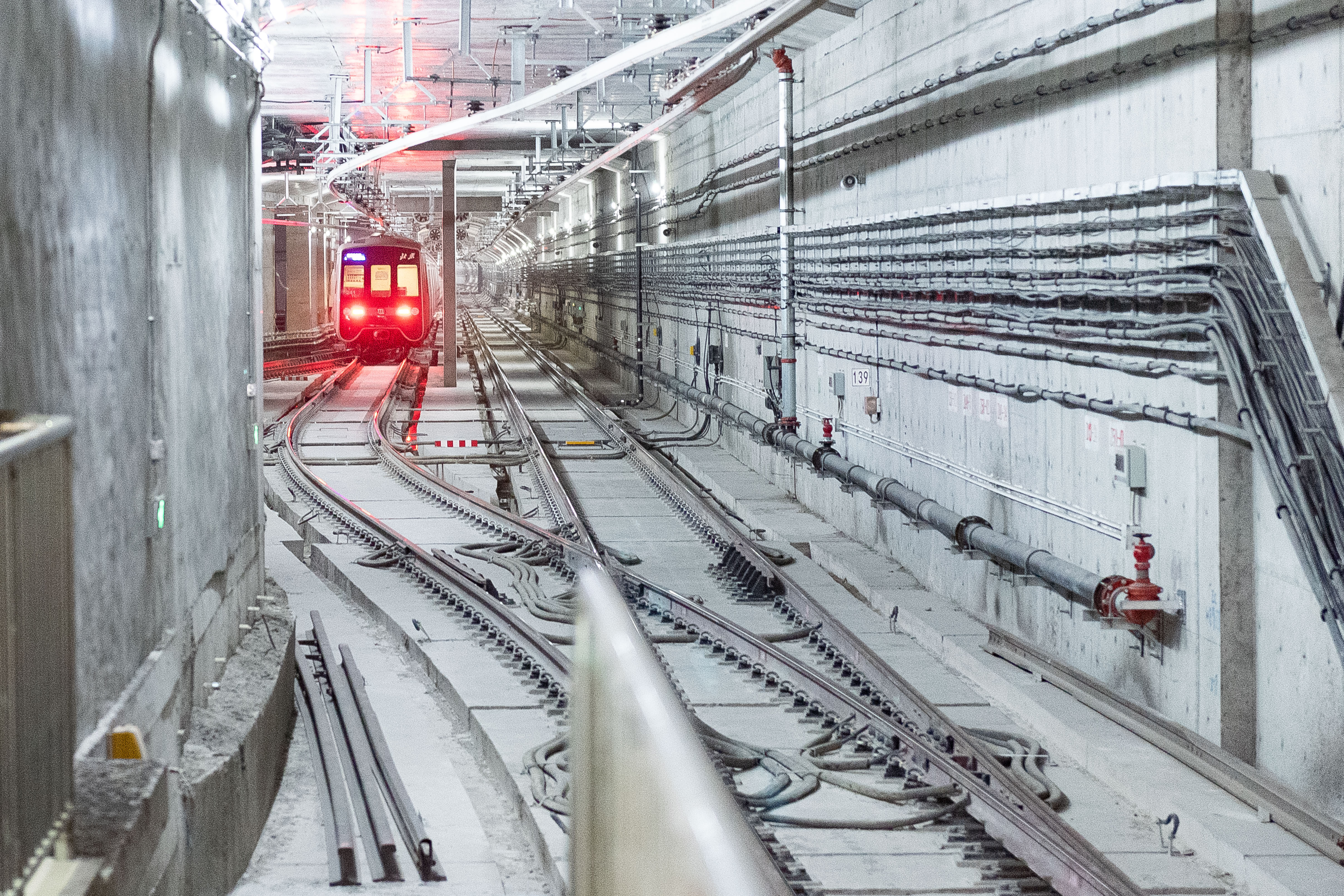
line 14 west bottleneck

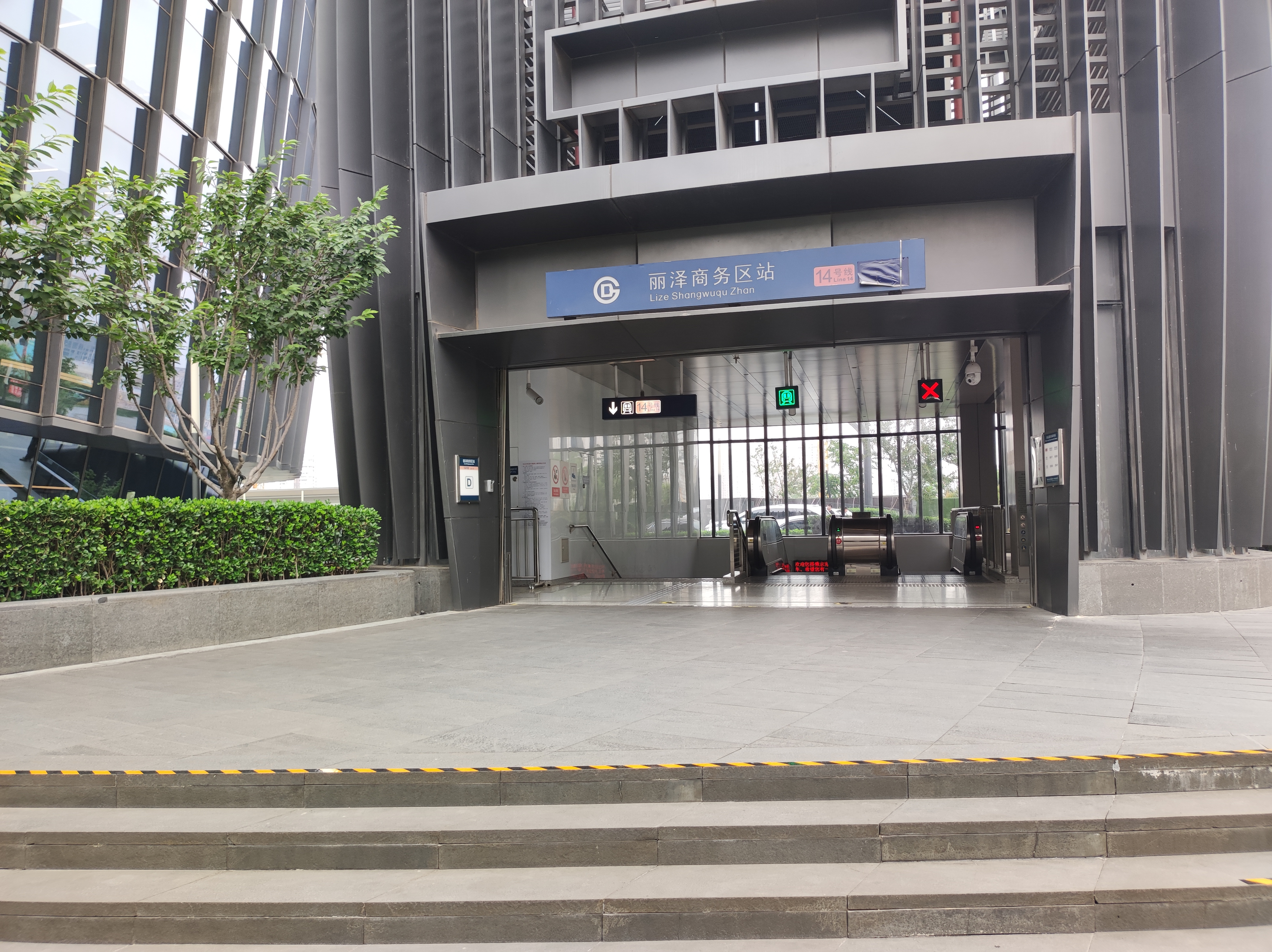
Exit D

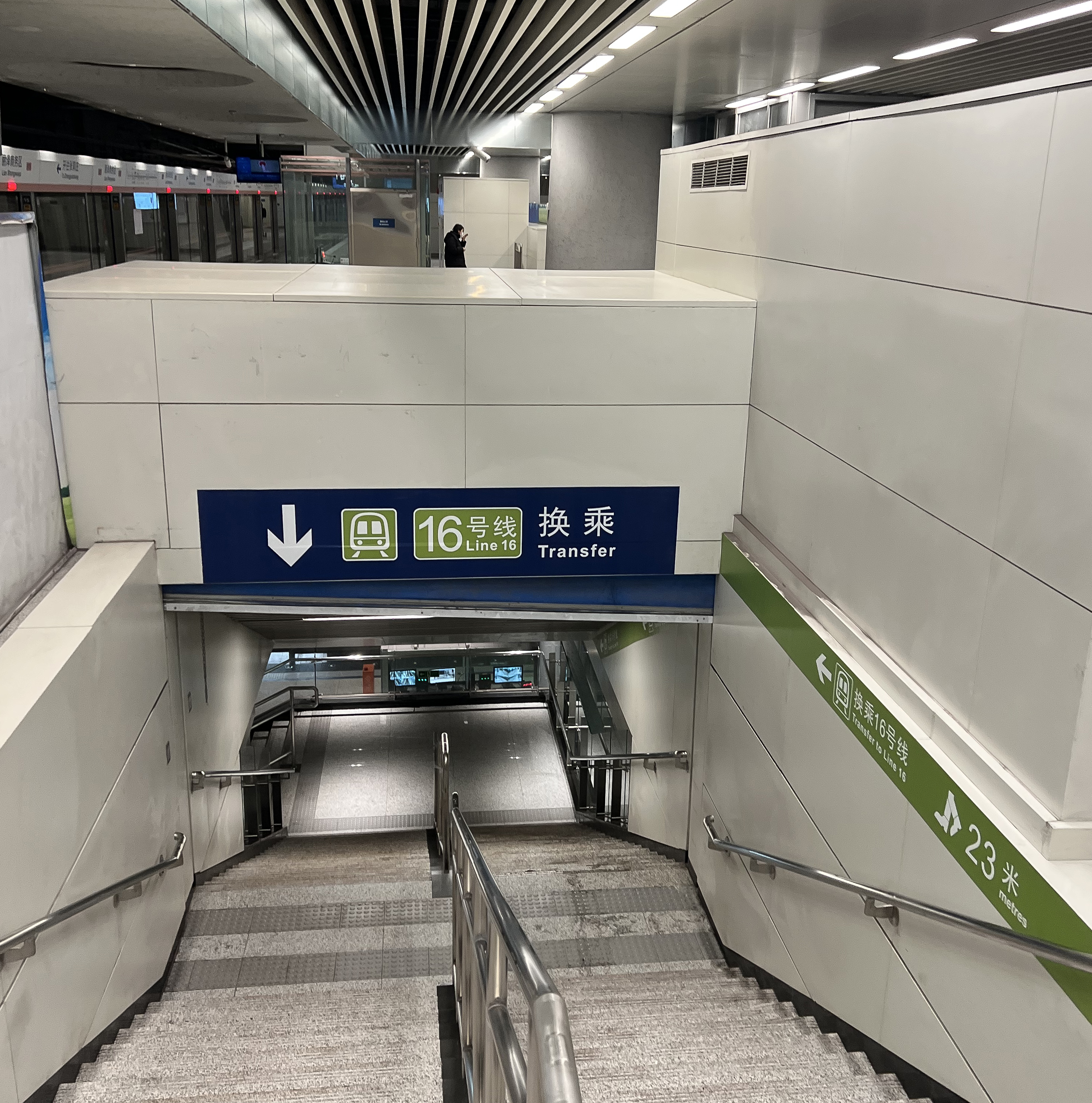
Transfer node from line 14 to line 16 (January 10, 2025)

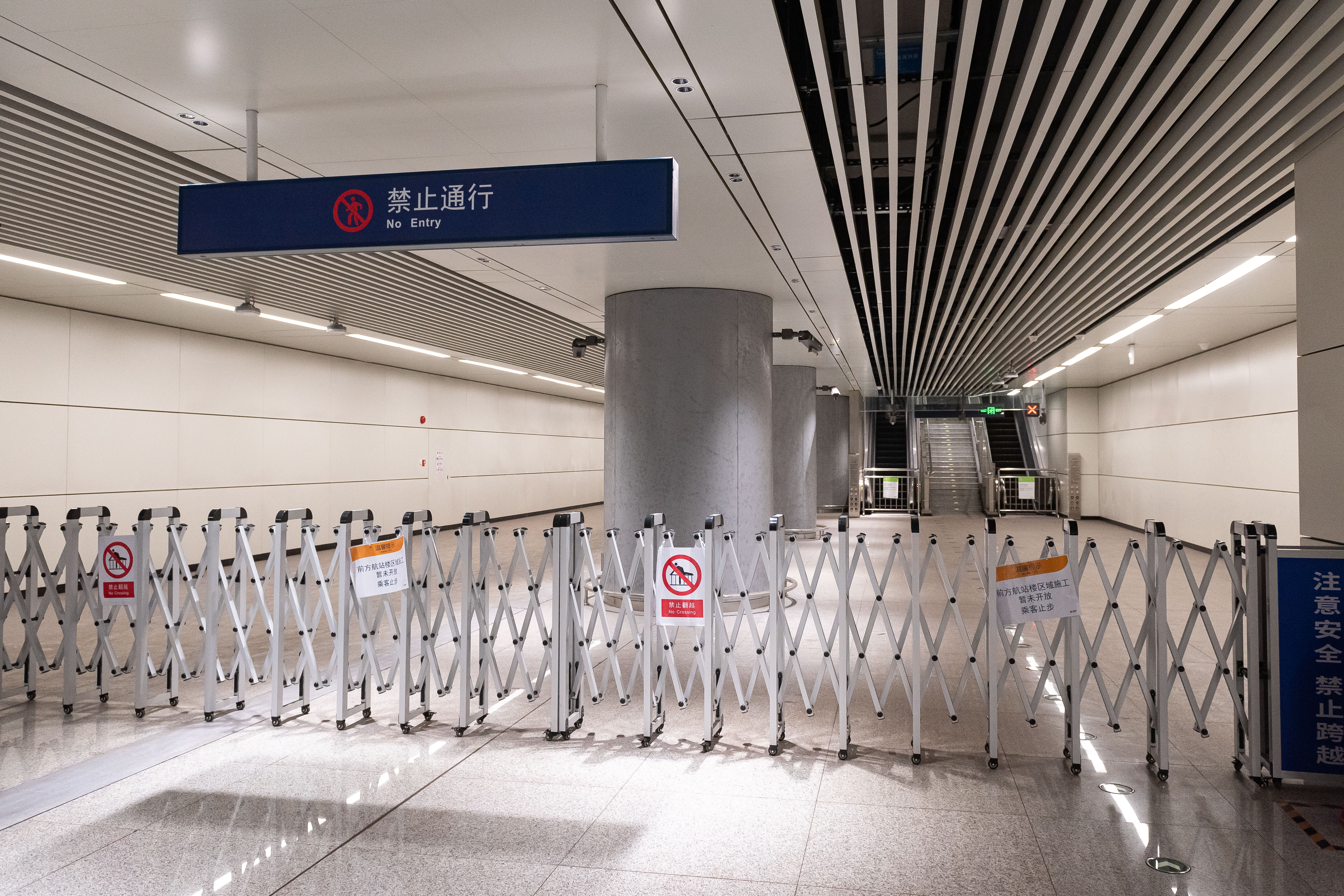
Reserved space for Daxing Airport Express interchange
