= Moshikou station =

Beijing Subway station

Moshikou 模式口
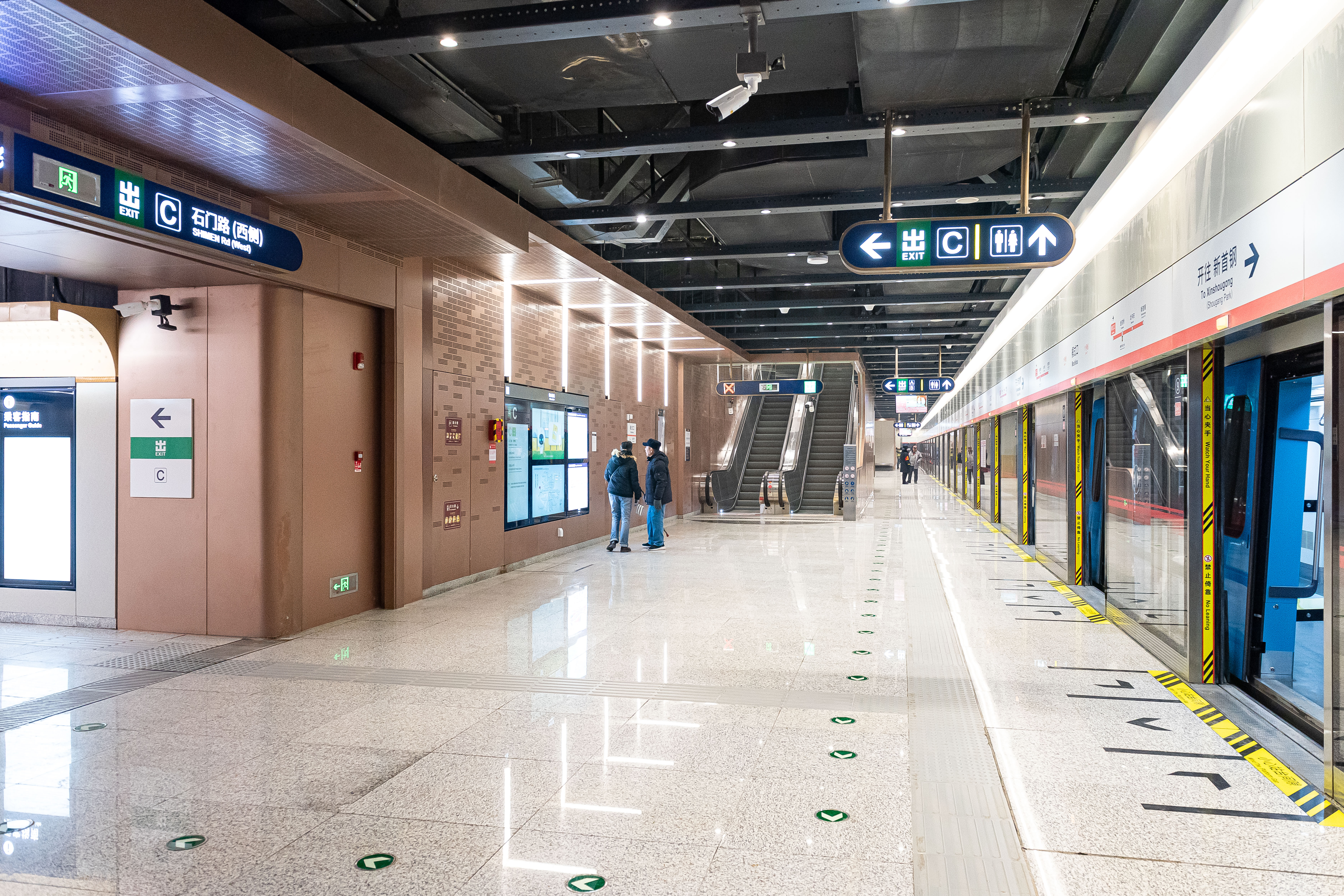
- Platform

General information
- Location: Intersection of Shimen Road (石门路) and Moshikou Street (模式口大街); Jindingjie Subdistrict, Shijingshan District, Beijing; China
- Coordinates: 39.932339°N 116.149690°E
- Operator: Beijing Mass Transit Railway Operation Corporation Limited
- Line: Line 11
- Platforms: 2 (2 side platforms)
- Tracks: 2

Construction
- Structure type: Underground
- Accessible: Yes

History
- Opened: December 30, 2023; 2 years ago

Services
| Preceding station | Beijing Subway | Following station |
|---|---|---|
| Terminus | Line 11 | Jin'anqiao towards Xinshougang (Shougang Park) |
Location
- Location within Beijing

Moshikou station (Chinese: 模式口站; pinyin: Móshìkǒu zhàn) is a subway station on Line 11 of the Beijing Subway. It opened on 30 December 2023, and is the northern terminus of the line.

== History ==
The original project name of this station is Jindingjie station. On September 25, 2020, the Beijing Municipal Commission of Planning and Natural Resources announced the 'Notice on the Naming Plan for Stations Along the Western Section of Rail Transit Line 11 Project', with plans to rename Jindingjie station to Moshikou station. On November 18, 2020, the station was officially renamed as Moshikou station.

The station was capped on June 2, 2021, before passing project acceptance inspection on November 15 in the same year.

== Station layout ==
The station has 2 underground side platforms. Only the western-facing platform is in use. There are 3 exits, lettered A, B and C, all of which lead to Shimen Road. Exit A is accessible.

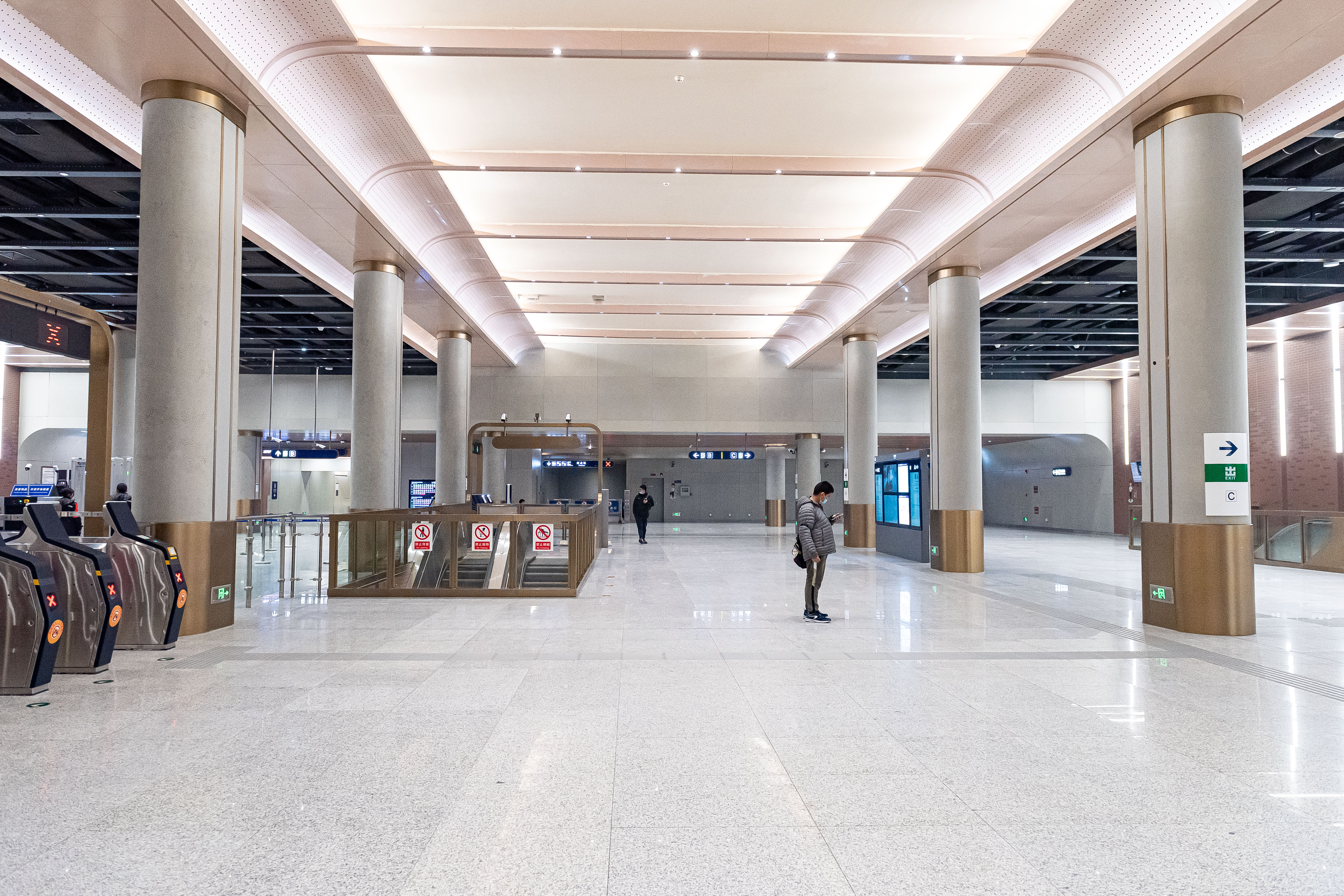
Concourse
