= Jindingjie Subdistrict =

Jindingjie Subdistrict 金顶街街道
- Subdistrict
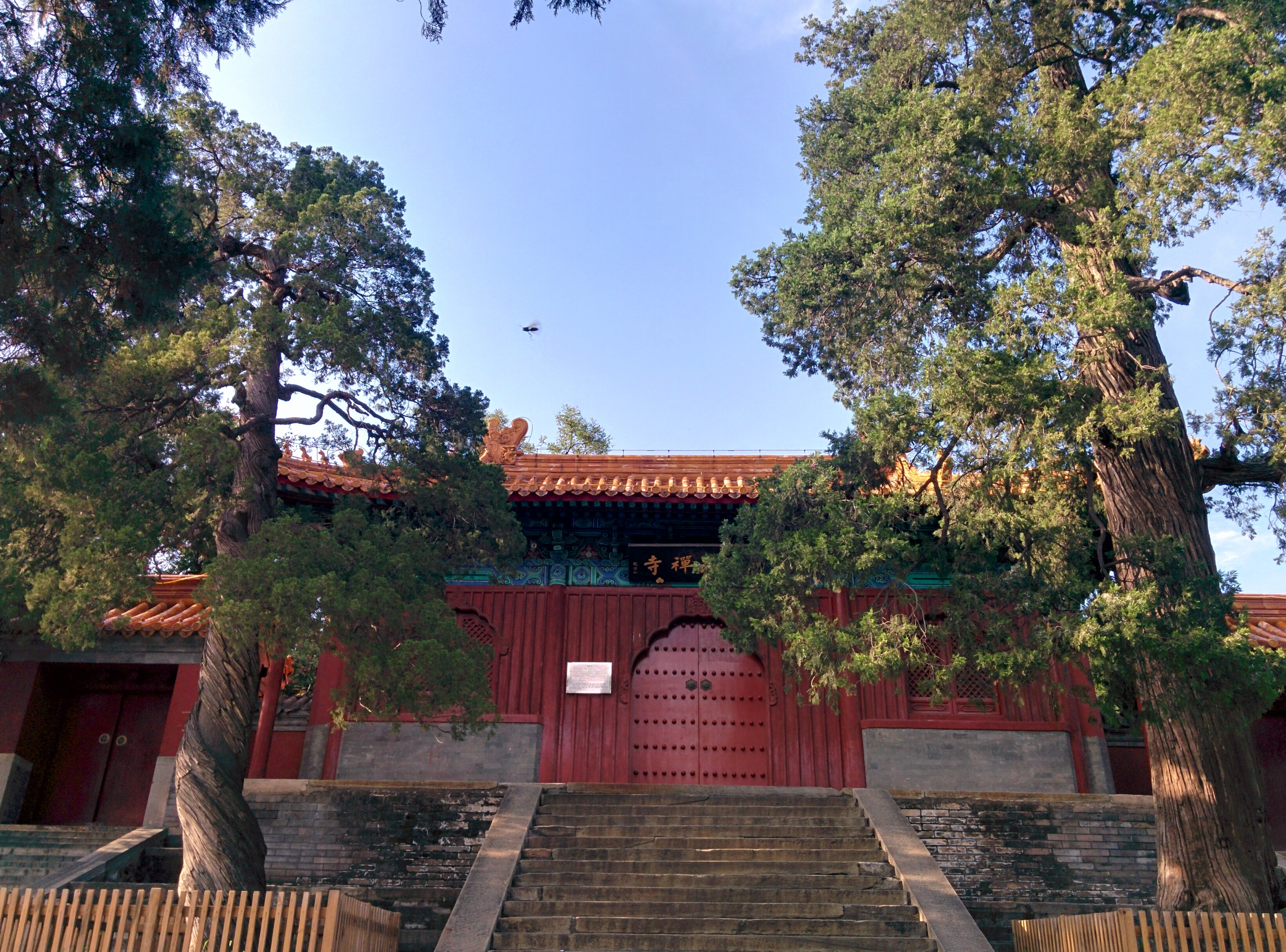
- Fahai Temple on the south of the subdistrict

- Location within Beijing Location within China
- Coordinates: 39°55′45″N 116°09′12″E
- Country: China
- Municipality: Beijing
- District: Shijingshan
- Village-level Divisions: 17 communities

Area
  - Total: 3.94 km^{2} (1.52 sq mi)

Population (2020)
  - Total: 67,734
  - Density: 17,200/km^{2} (44,500/sq mi)
- Time zone: UTC+8 (China Standard)
- Postal code: 100043
- Area code: 010

Jindingjie Subdistrict (Chinese: 金顶街街道; pinyin: Jīndǐngjiē Jiēdào) is a subdistrict within the northwestern part of Shijingshan District, Beijing, China. It shares border with Wulituo Subdistrict in the north, Pingguoyuan Subdistrict in the east, Gucheng Subdistrict in the south, and Guangning Subdistrict in the west. The population of the subdistrict was 67,734 as of 2020.

== History ==
The subdistrict was first created in 1954. In August 1958, it was reformed into Jindingjie Reisidents' Production Team, before reinstated as a subdistrict in 1963.

== Administrative Divisions ==
In 2021, the following 15 communities constitutes Jindingjie Subdistrict:

Administrative division code	Subdivision names	Name transliterations
110107006003	金顶街四区	Jindingjie Siqu
110107006004	金顶街一区	Jindingjie Yiqu
110107006005	赵山	Zhaoshan
110107006006	西福村	Xifucun
110107006008	铸造村	Zhuzaocun
110107006010	模式口东里	Moshikou Dongli
110107006013	模式口中里	Moshikou Zhongli
110107006014	模式口南里	Moshikou Nanli
110107006023	模式口北里	Moshikou Beili
110107006024	模式口村	Moshikoucun
110107006026	金顶街三区	Jindingjie Sanqu
110107006027	金顶街五区	Jindingjie Wuqu
110107006028	模式口西里南区	Moshikou Xili Nanqu
110107006029	模式口西里北区	Moshikou Xili Beiqu
110107006030	模式口西里中区	Moshikou Xili Zhongqu
110107006031	金顶街二区	Jindingjie Erqu
110107006032	铸造村二区	Zhuzaocun Erqu

== Landmark ==
- Fahai Temple

== See also ==
- List of township-level divisions of Beijing
