= Dongguantounan station =

Beijing Subway Line 16 and Fangshan line station

Dongguantounan 东管头南
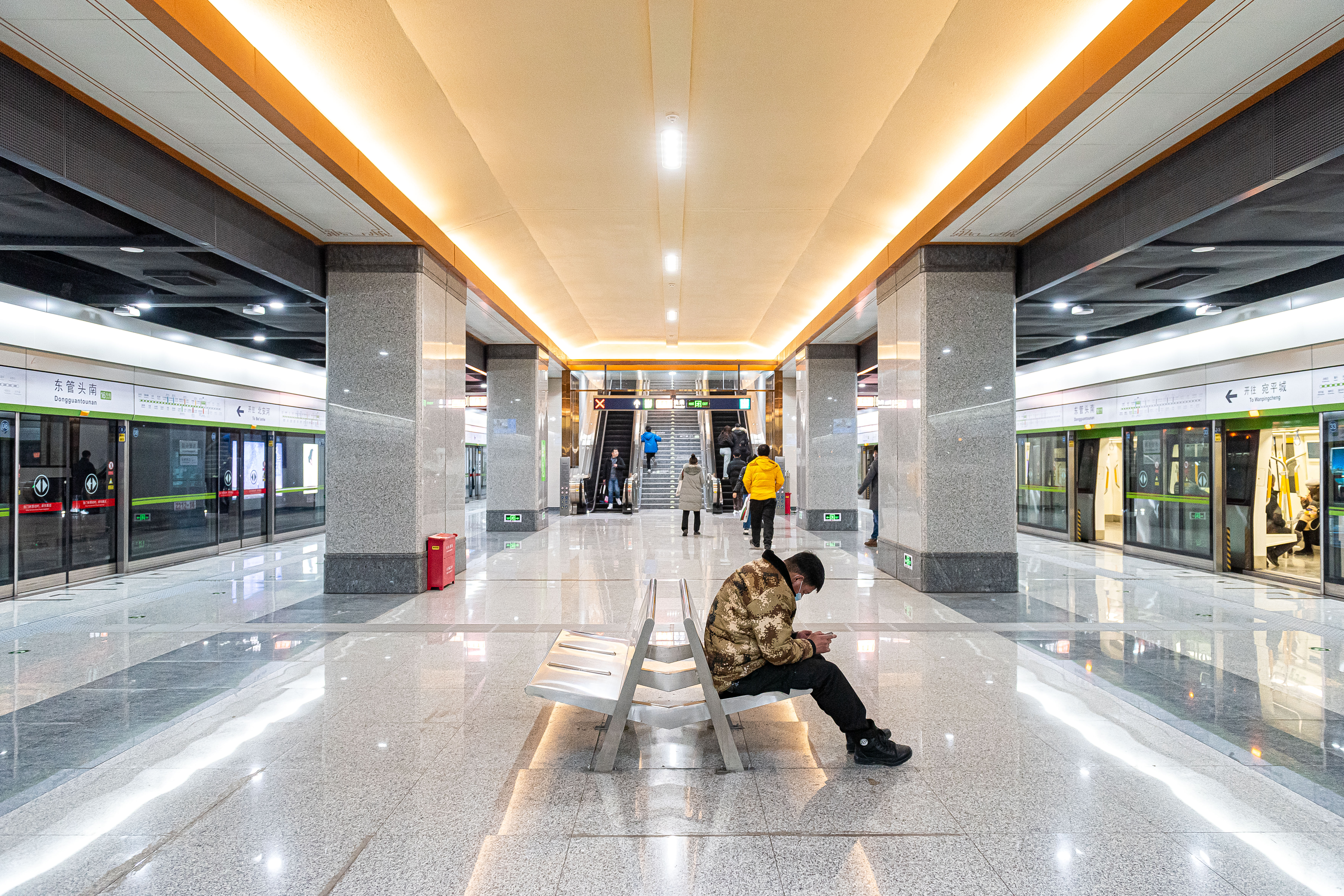
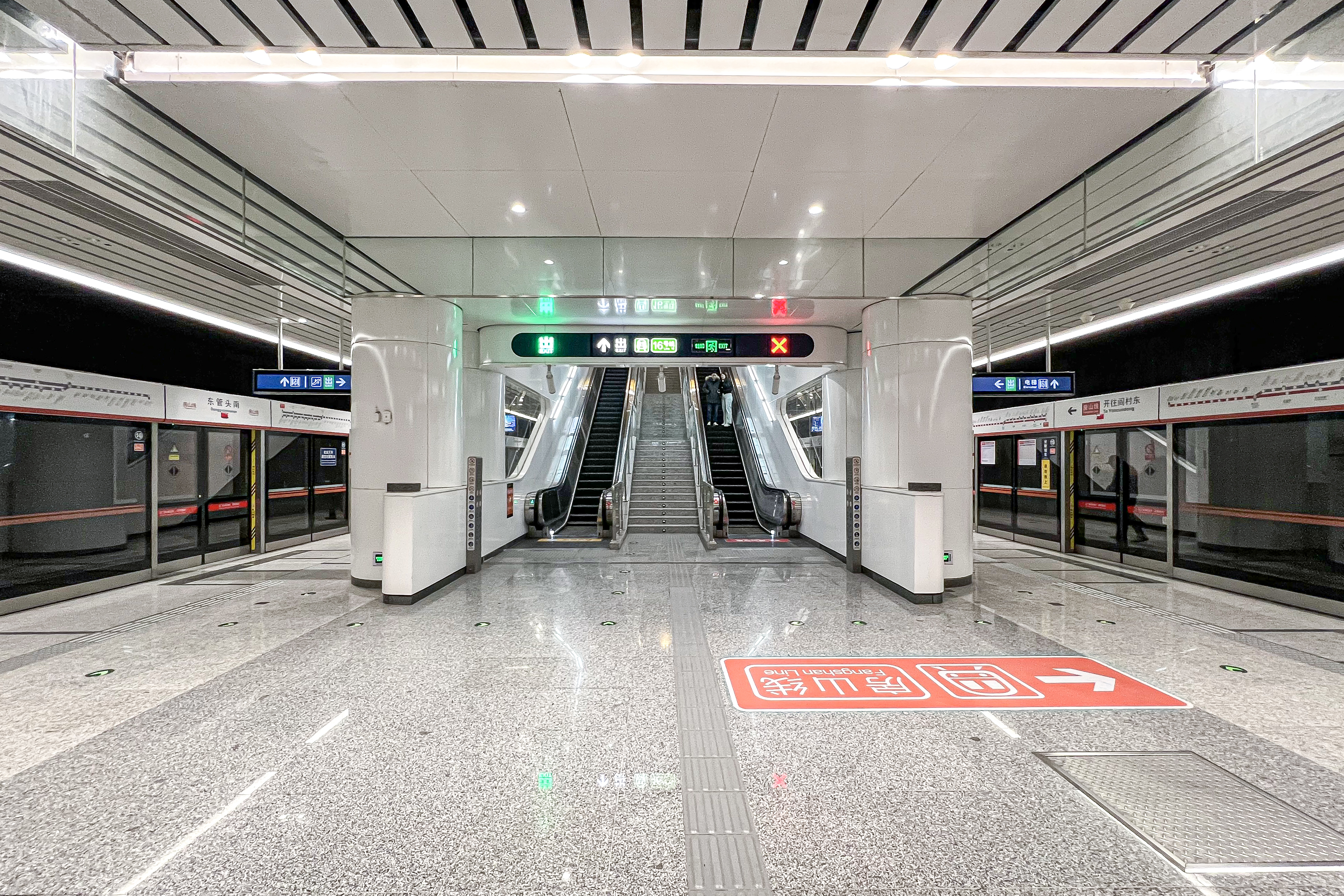
- Line 16 platform Fangshan line platform

General information
- Location: Dongguantou South Street and Beijingxizhan South Road; Fengtai District, Beijing; China
- Coordinates: 39°51′11″N 116°19′00″E
- Operator: Beijing Mass Transit Railway Operation Corporation Limited; Beijing MTR Metro Line 16 Corp., Ltd.
- Lines: Line 16; Fangshan line
- Platforms: 4 (2 island platforms)
- Tracks: 4

Construction
- Structure type: Underground
- Accessible: Yes

History
- Opened: Fangshan line: December 31, 2020; 5 years ago; Line 16: December 31, 2022; 3 years ago
- Former names: Xiajia Hutong (夏家胡同), Fengyiqiaonan (丰益桥南)

Services
Preceding station	Beijing Subway	Following station
Lize Shangwuqu towards Bei'anhe	Line 16	Fengtai railway station towards Wanpingcheng
Terminus	Fangshan line	Capital Univ. of Economics & Business towards Yancundong
Location

Dongguantounan station (Chinese: 东管头南站; pinyin: Dōngguǎntóu Nán zhàn) is an interchange station on Line 16 and Fangshan line of the Beijing Subway.

== History ==
The station was originally known as Xiajia Hutong station and Fengyiqiaonan station, and was officially renamed Dongguantounan station in October 2020. The Fangshan line station opened on December 31, 2020, and the Line 16 station opened on December 31, 2022.

== Station layout ==
Both the line 16 and Fangshan line stations have underground island platforms. There are 5 exits, lettered A, B, C, E and F. Exits B and E are accessible via elevators.

== Gallery ==
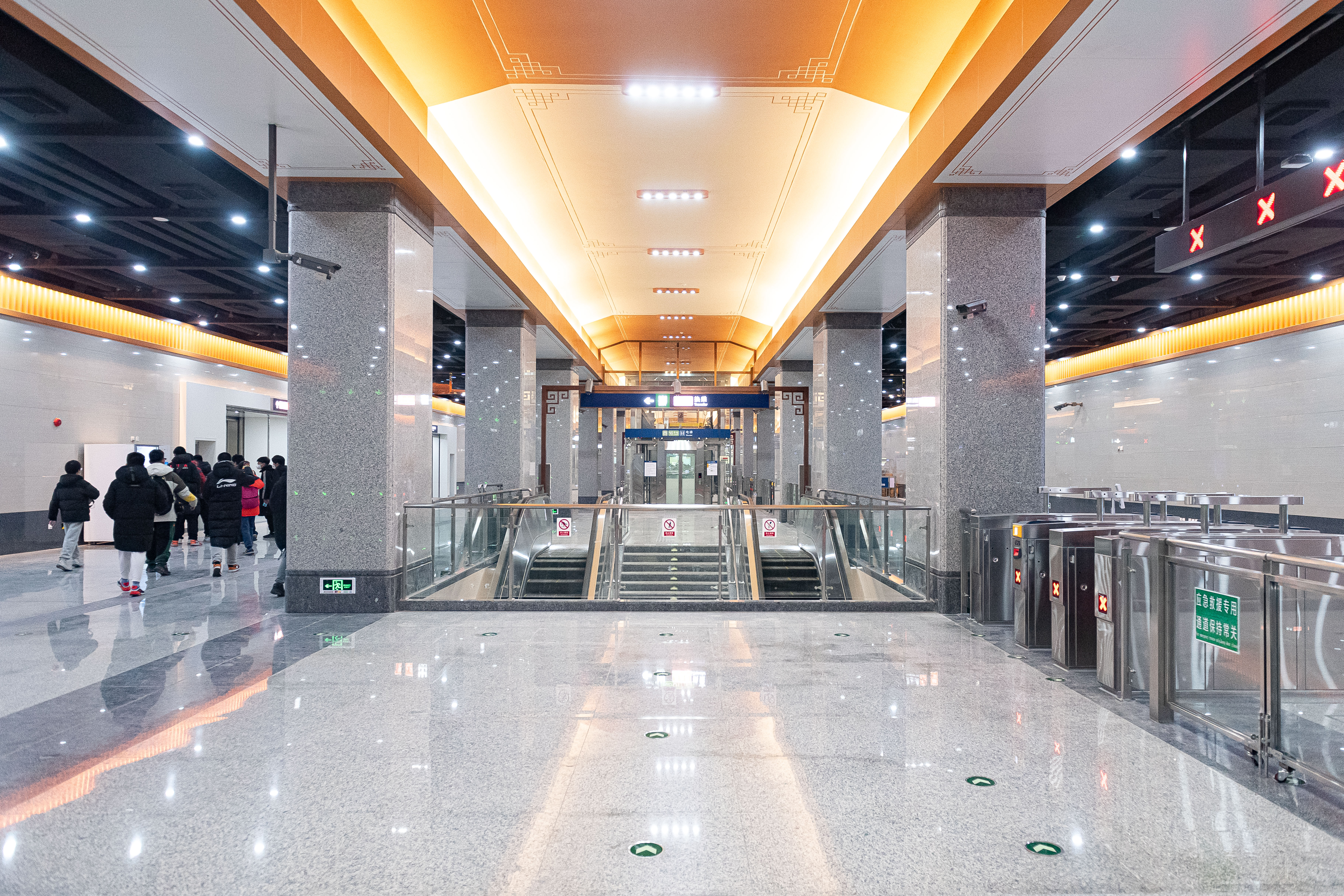
Line 16 concourse (December 2022)

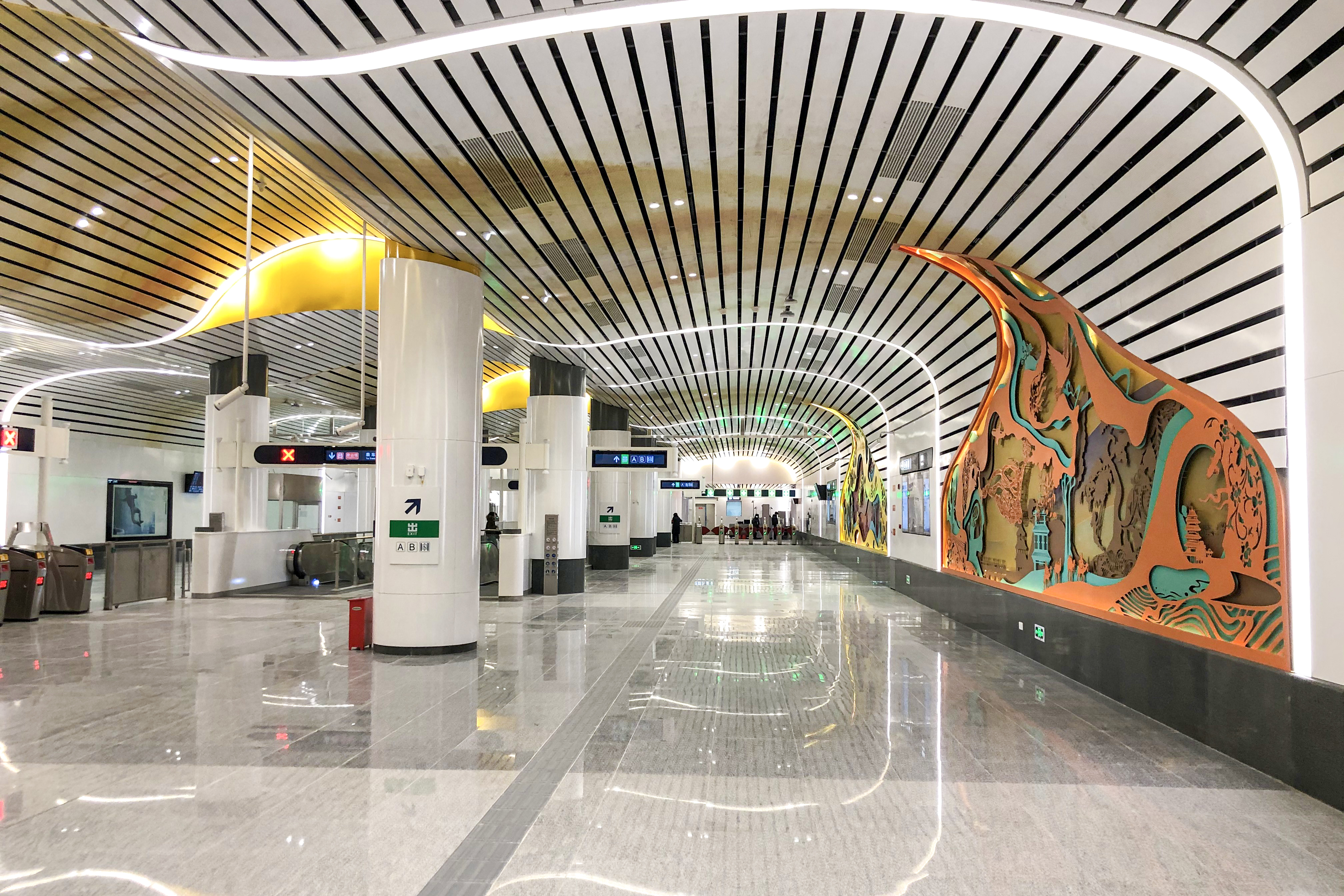
Fangshan line concourse (January 2021)

== See also ==
- Dongguantou station on Line 14
