= Fahai Temple Forest Park =

Park in Beijing, China

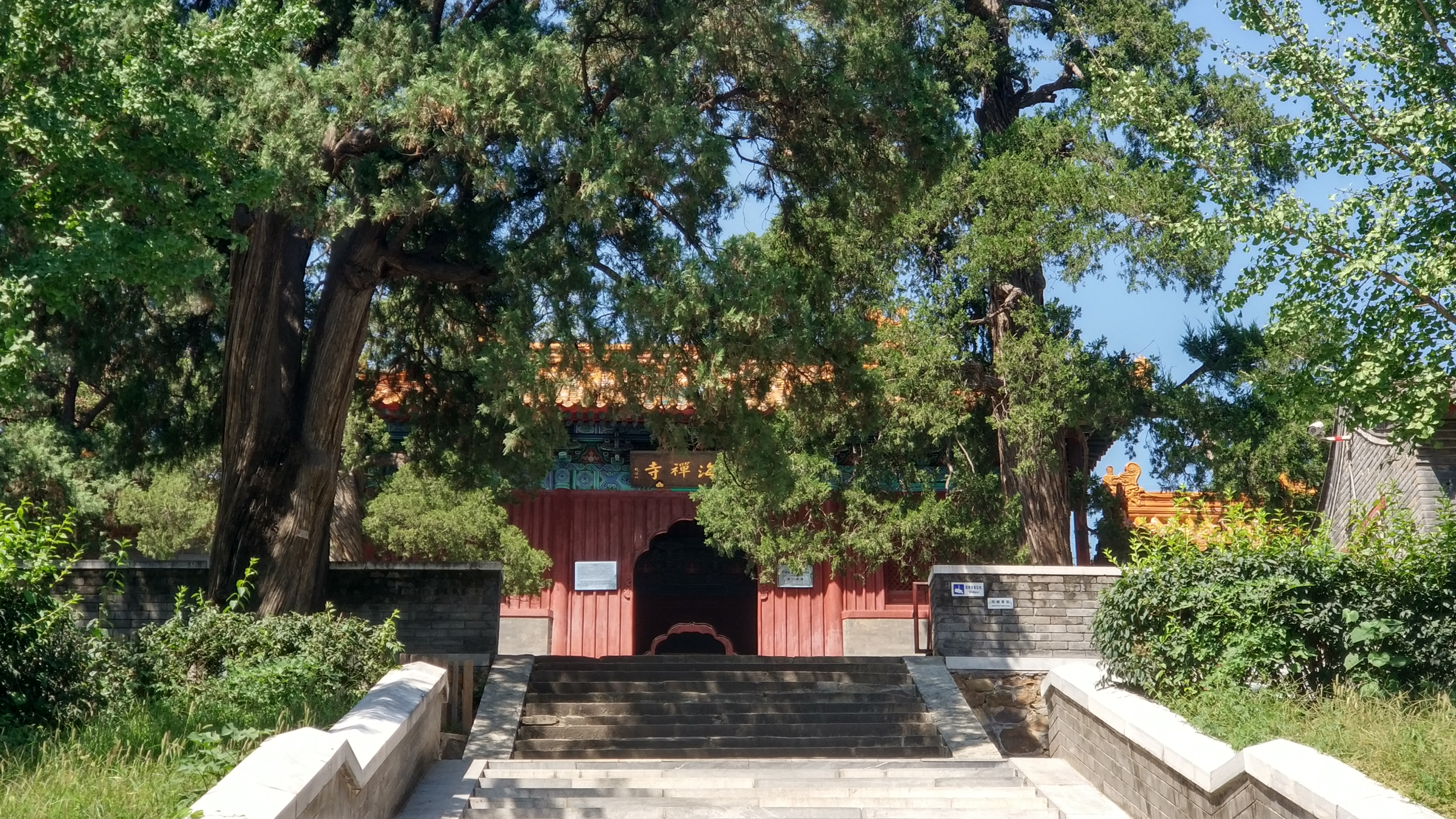
- The Fahai Temple

- Location within Beijing Location within China
- Type: Urban park, Forest park
- Location: Beijing, China
- Coordinates: 39.9401°N 116.1533°E
- Area: 240 hectares (590 acres)
- Created: 1439 (Fahai Temple); 1987 (the Park)
- Operator: Shijingshan District
- Status: Open all year

Fahai Temple Forest Park (Chinese: 法海寺森林公园) is one of the largest public parks within the 6th Ring Road of Beijing. It is located near the Cuiwei Mountain, in the Moshikou region of Shijingshan District, which is in the western part of central Beijing.

Fahai Temple was constructed during the reign of Zhengtong Emperor of Ming Dynasty, and it is the home to one of the best preserved Ming Dynasty's buddhist frescoes in China. In 1987, the Shijingshan government created a forest park around the temple. The forest park provides people a good place to enjoy the nature, and to view ancient architectures, special species and geological landforms.
