= Xinshougang (Shougang Park) station =

Beijing Subway station

Xinshougang (Shougang Park) 新首钢
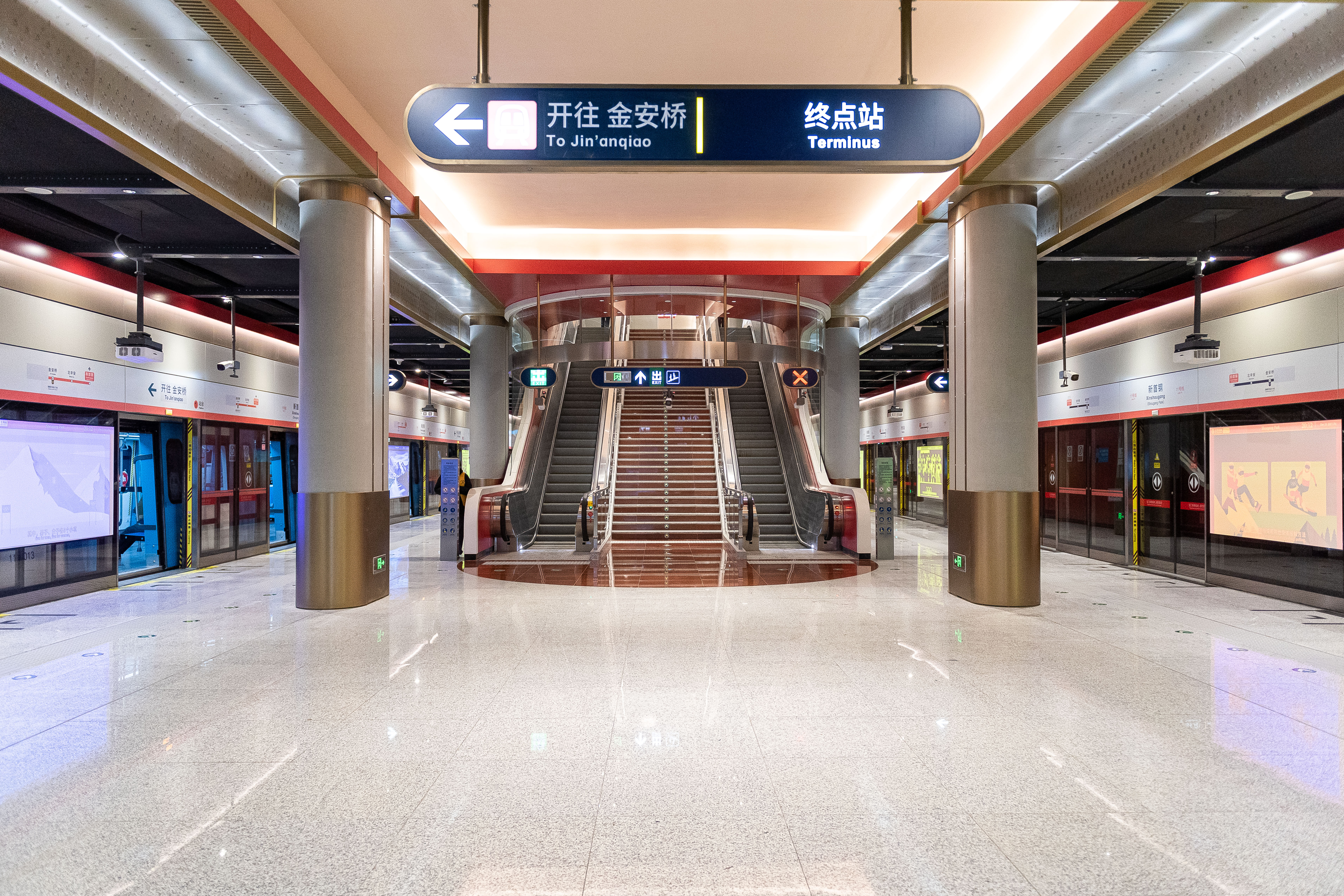

General information
- Location: Xiulichang Street (修理厂街); Shijingshan District, Beijing; China
- Coordinates: 39°54′30″N 116°09′31″E
- Operator: Beijing Mass Transit Railway Operation Corporation Limited
- Line: Line 11
- Platforms: 2 (1 island platform)
- Tracks: 2

Construction
- Structure type: Underground
- Accessible: Yes

History
- Opened: December 31, 2021

Services
Preceding station	Beijing Subway	Following station
Beixin'an towards Moshikou	Line 11	Terminus
Location

Xinshougang (Shougang Park) station (Note: Only announced as "Shougang Park" in English announcements of trains or stations) (Chinese: 新首钢站; pinyin: Xīnshǒugāng Zhàn) is a subway station on Line 11 of the Beijing Subway. The station opened on December 31, 2021. It is the southern terminus of the line.

The station's name comes from the nearby Shougang Park, the former site of Shougang Group.

== Platform layout ==
The station has an underground island platform. Only one side of the platform is in use.

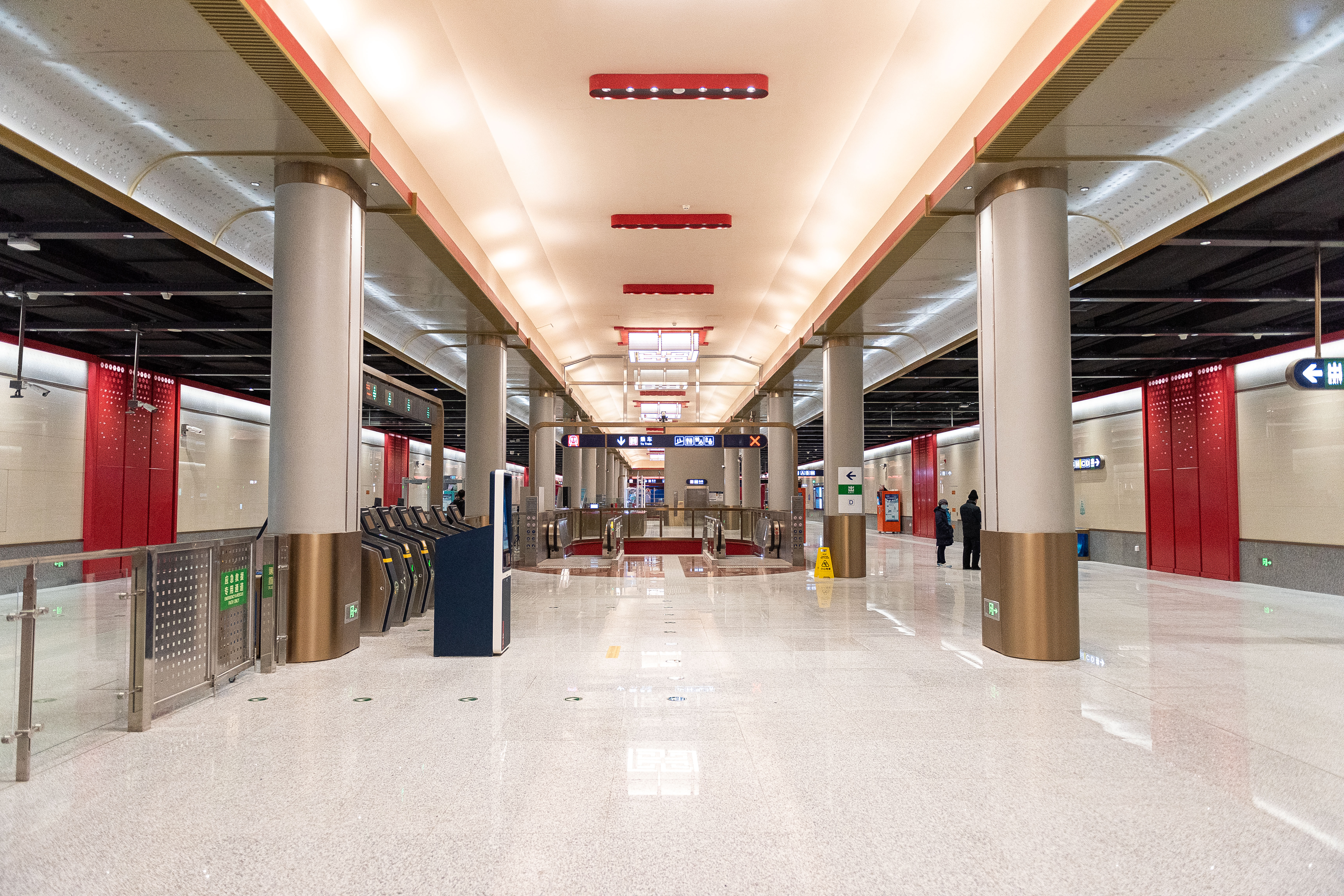
Concourse

== Exits ==
There are 4 exits, lettered A, B, C and D. Exit A is accessible.
