= Guangning Subdistrict, Beijing =

Guangning Subdistrict 广宁街道
- Subdistrict
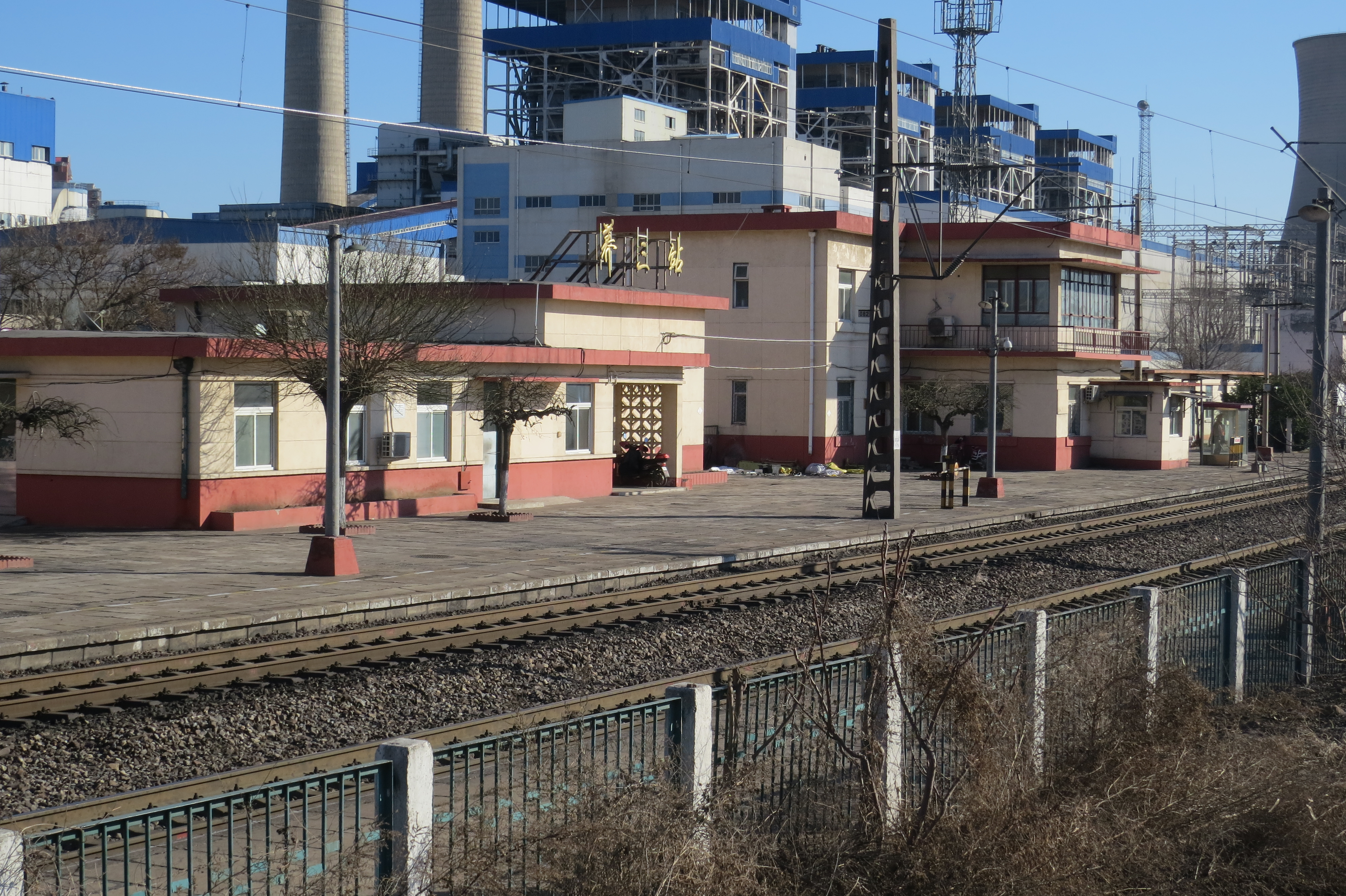
- Yangsan Railway station inside of the subdistrict, 2015

- Location within Beijing Location within China
- Coordinates: 39°55′37″N 116°08′27″E
- Country: China
- Municipality: Beijing
- District: Shijingshan
- Village-level Divisions: 5 communities

Area
  - Total: 6.11 km^{2} (2.36 sq mi)

Population (2020)
  - Total: 14,684
  - Density: 2,400/km^{2} (6,220/sq mi)
- Time zone: UTC+8 (China Standard)
- Postal code: 100041
- Area code: 010

Guangning Subdistrict (Chinese: 广宁街道; pinyin: Guǎngníng Jiēdào) is a subdistrict that makes up the northwestern corner of Shijingshan District, Beijing, China. It borders Wulituo Subdistrict to the north, Jindingjie Subdistrict to the east, Gucheng Subdistrict to the south, and Mentougou District to the west. As of 2020, it had a total of 14,684 inhabitants.

The name Guangning (Chinese: 广宁; lit. 'Extensive Tranquility') comes from Count of Guangning of the Ming dynasty, who was buried here after his death.

== History ==
Timeline of History of Guangning Subdistrict
Year	Status
1954	Set up as Guangning Subdistrict
1958	Changed to Guangning Subdistrict Residents' Production Team
1963	Reintroduced as a subdistrict

== Administrative Division ==
In 2021, Guangning Subdistrict was administreatively divided into 5 communities, which were listed in the table below:

Administrative division code	Subdivision names	Name transliteration
110107009001	东山	Dongshan
110107009003	新立街	Xinlijie
110107009007	麻峪	Mayu
110107009008	麻峪北	Mayubei
110107009011	高井路	Gaojinglu

== See also ==
- List of township-level divisions of Beijing
