= Fahai Temple =

Buddhist temple in Beijing, China

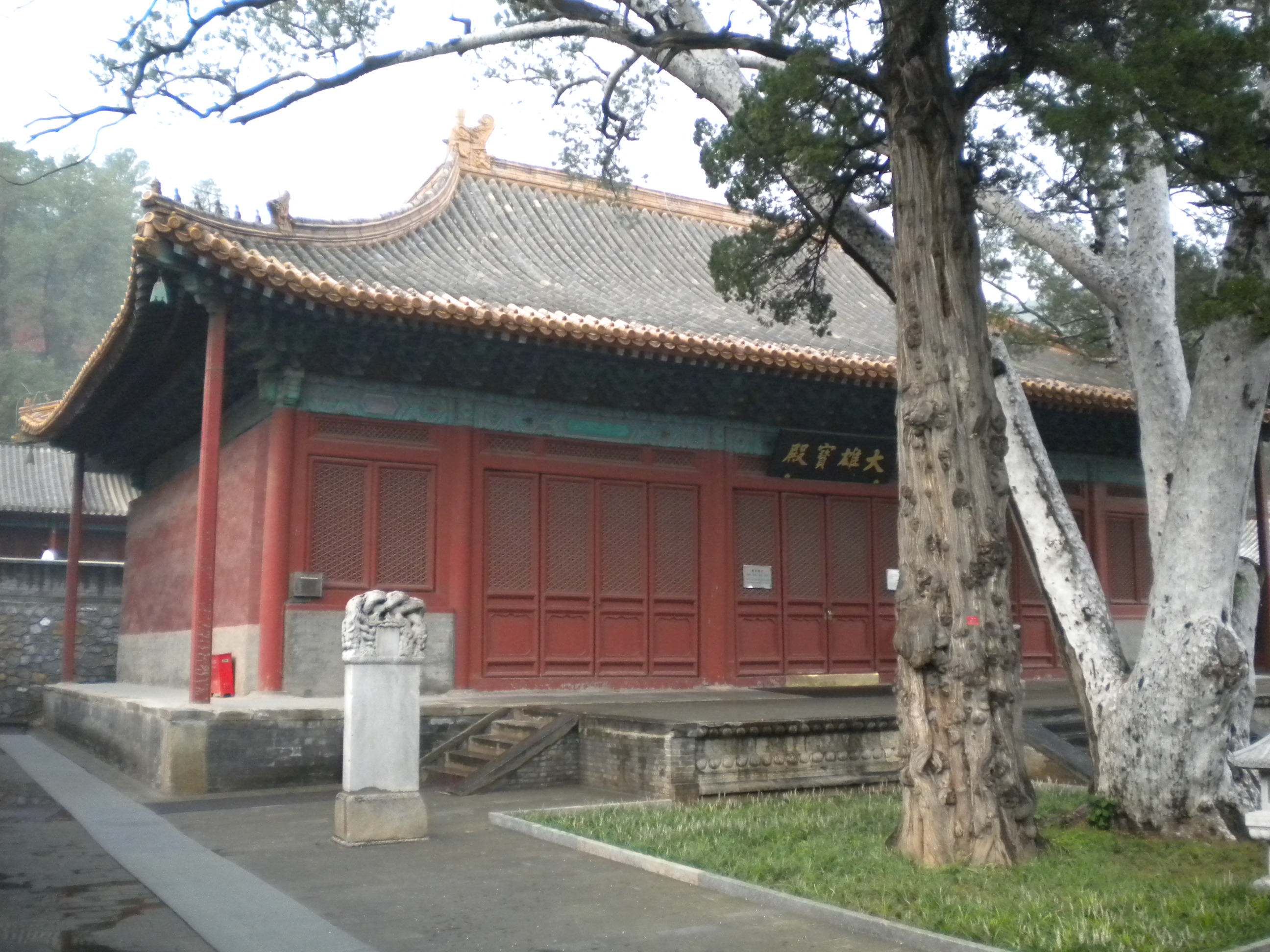
- The Fahai Temple

Religion
- Affiliation: Buddhism

Location
- Location: Beijing
- Country: China
- Interactive map of Fahai Temple
- Coordinates: 39°56′24.36″N 116°9′11.88″E

Architecture
- Completed: 1443

Fahai Temple
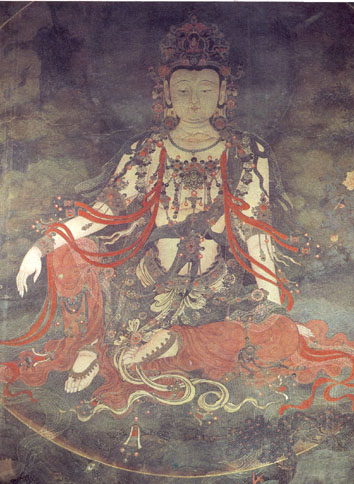
- Portrait of the Water-Moon Bodhisattva from the temple's Ming frescoes

Chinese name
- Chinese: 法海寺
- Literal meaning: Law Sea Temple
Transcriptions
Standard Mandarin
- Hanyu Pinyin: Fǎhǎi Sì
- Wade–Giles: Fa-hai Ssu

Sanskrit name
- Sanskrit: धर्म समुद्र विहार; Dharma Samudra Vihāra

The Fahai Temple is a Ming-era Buddhist temple located at the foot of Cuiwei Mountain about two kilometers to the north-east of Moshikou, Shijingshan District, Beijing, China. It was declared as a national cultural relic protection unit in 1988. It is located within Fahai Temple Forest Park.

== History ==
Construction of the Fahai Temple started in 1439 during the Ming dynasty and was completed in 1443.

== Frescoes ==
The most distinguishing part of Fahai Temple is the Ming dynasty frescoes. The total area of the frescoes is 236.7 square meters. Comparing with other famous frescoes in China, such as the Yongle Palace frescoes and the Dunhuang frescoes, Fahai Temple's well-preserved frescoes are also notable in the depiction of figures, subtlety of patterns and the craft methods.

== Cultural relics ==
- Bronze Bell
