= Sidao Qiao station =

Beijing Subway station

Sidao Qiao 四道桥
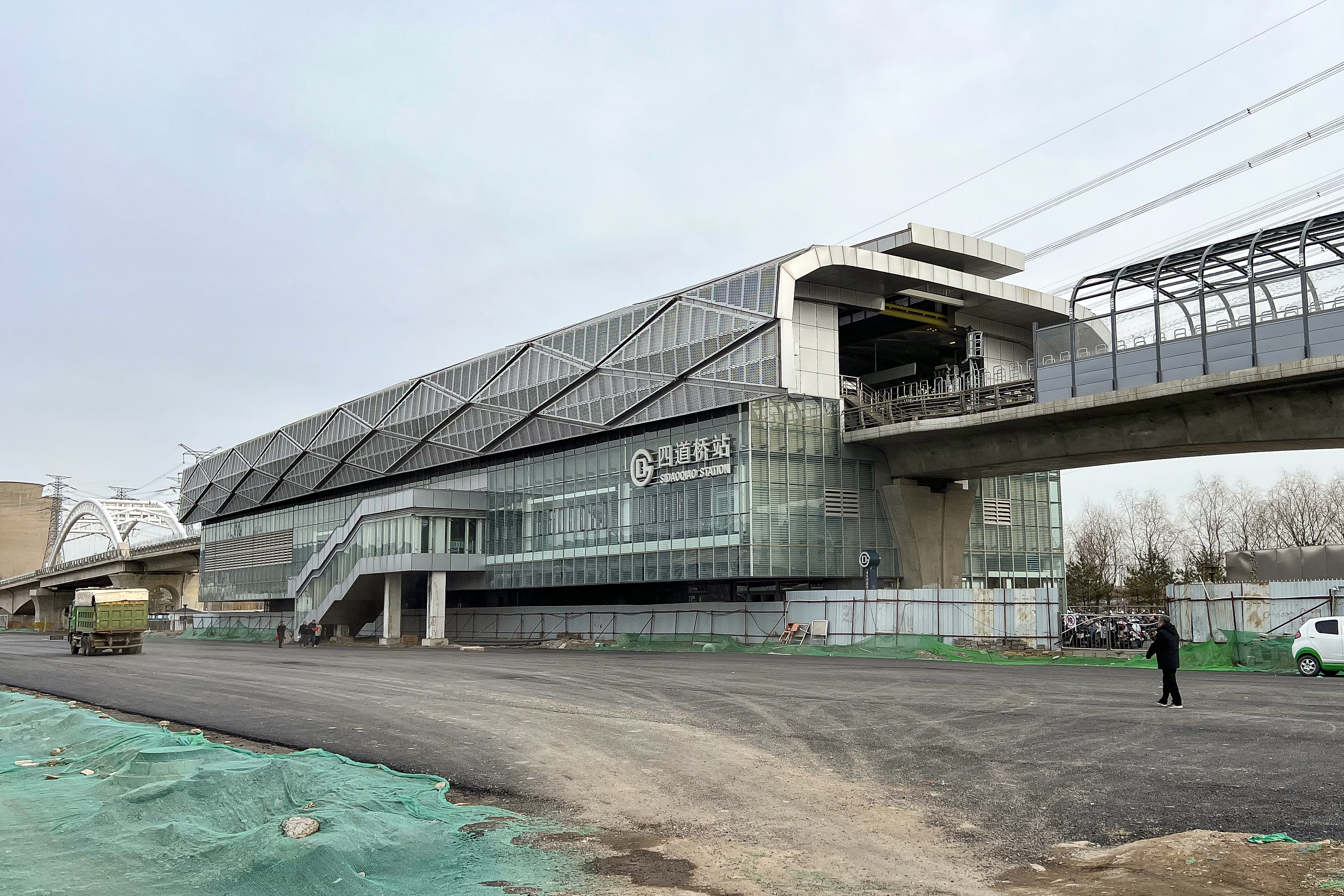
- Sidao Qiao Station in February 2023

General information
- Location: Shilong Road (石龙路) and Yudai Street (玉带街), near Sidao Bridge on West 6th Ring Road (G4501); Yongding, Mentougou District, Beijing; China
- Coordinates: 39°54′58″N 116°08′02″E
- Operator: Beijing Mass Transit Railway Operation Corporation Limited
- Line: Line S1
- Platforms: 2 (2 side platforms)
- Tracks: 2

Construction
- Structure type: Elevated
- Accessible: Yes

History
- Opened: December 30, 2017; 8 years ago

Services
Preceding station	Beijing Subway	Following station
Qiaohuying towards Shichang	Line S1	Jin'anqiao towards Pingguoyuan
Location
- Location within Beijing

Sidao Qiao station (simplified Chinese: 四道桥站; traditional Chinese: 四道橋站; pinyin: Sìdào Qiáo zhàn) is a station on Line S1 of the Beijing Subway, it was opened on 30 December 2017.

== Station layout ==
The station has 2 elevated side platforms.

== Exits ==
There are 2 exits, lettered A and B. Exit A is under planning and not opened yet. Exit B is accessible.
