= Qiaohuying station =

Beijing Subway station

Qiaohuying 桥户营
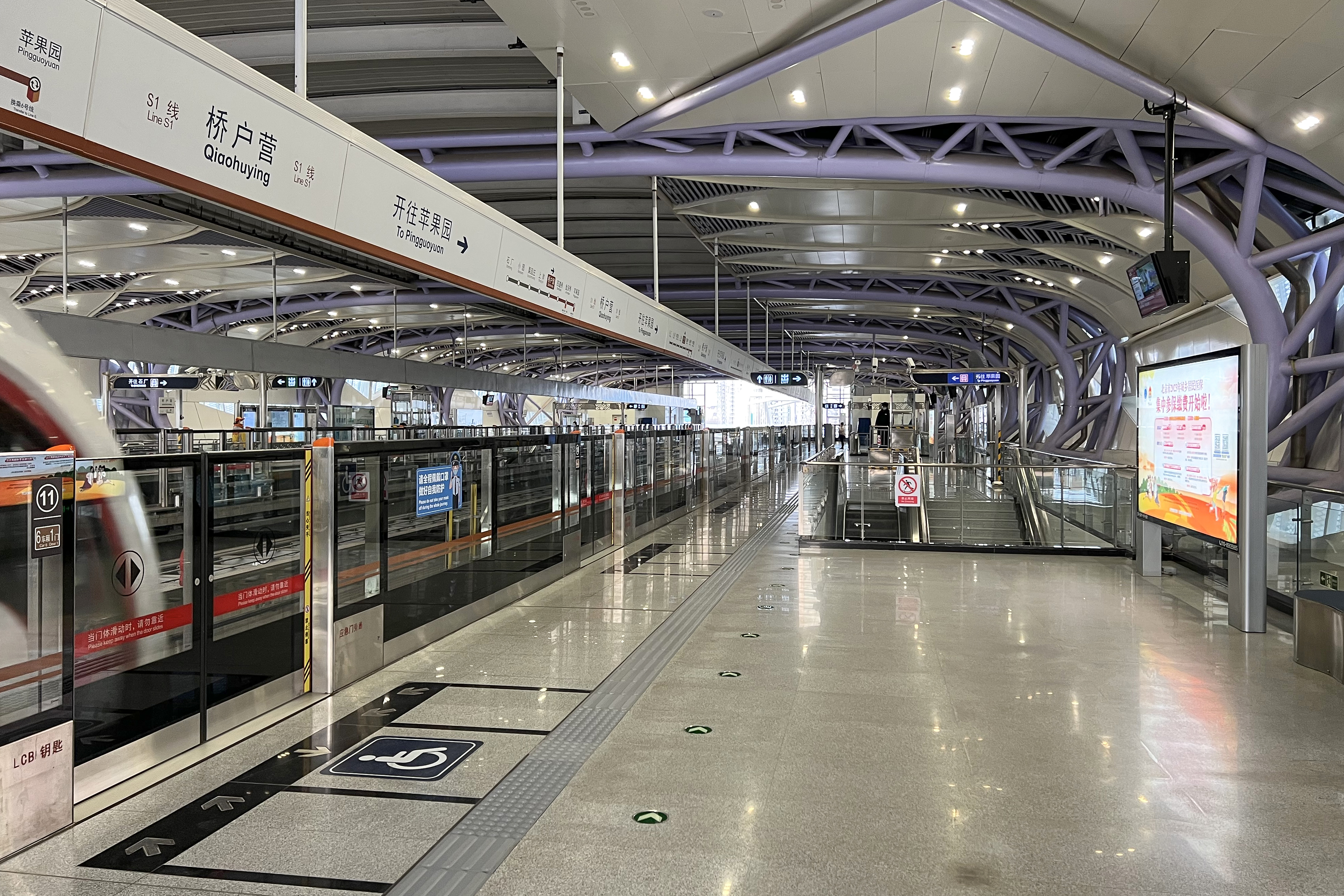
- Platform in February 2023

General information
- Other names: Shilonglu (石龙路), Caogezhuang (曹各庄)
- Location: East Shilong Road (石龙东路); Qiaohuying, Yongding, Mentougou District, Beijing; China
- Coordinates: 39°54′45″N 116°07′33″E
- Operator: Beijing Mass Transit Railway Operation Corporation Limited
- Line: Line S1
- Platforms: 2 (2 side platforms)
- Tracks: 2

Construction
- Structure type: Elevated
- Accessible: Yes

History
- Opened: December 30, 2017; 8 years ago

Services
Preceding station	Beijing Subway	Following station
Shang'an towards Shichang	Line S1	Sidao Qiao towards Pingguoyuan
Location
- Location within Beijing

Qiaohuying station (simplified Chinese: 桥户营站; traditional Chinese: 橋戶營站; pinyin: Qiáohùyíng Zhàn) is a station on Line S1 of the Beijing Subway, it was opened on 30 December 2017.

== Station layout ==
The station has 2 elevated side platforms.

== Exits ==
The station has 2 exits, lettered A and B. Both exits are accessible.
