= Liyuanzhuang station =

Beijing Subway station

Liyuanzhuang 栗园庄
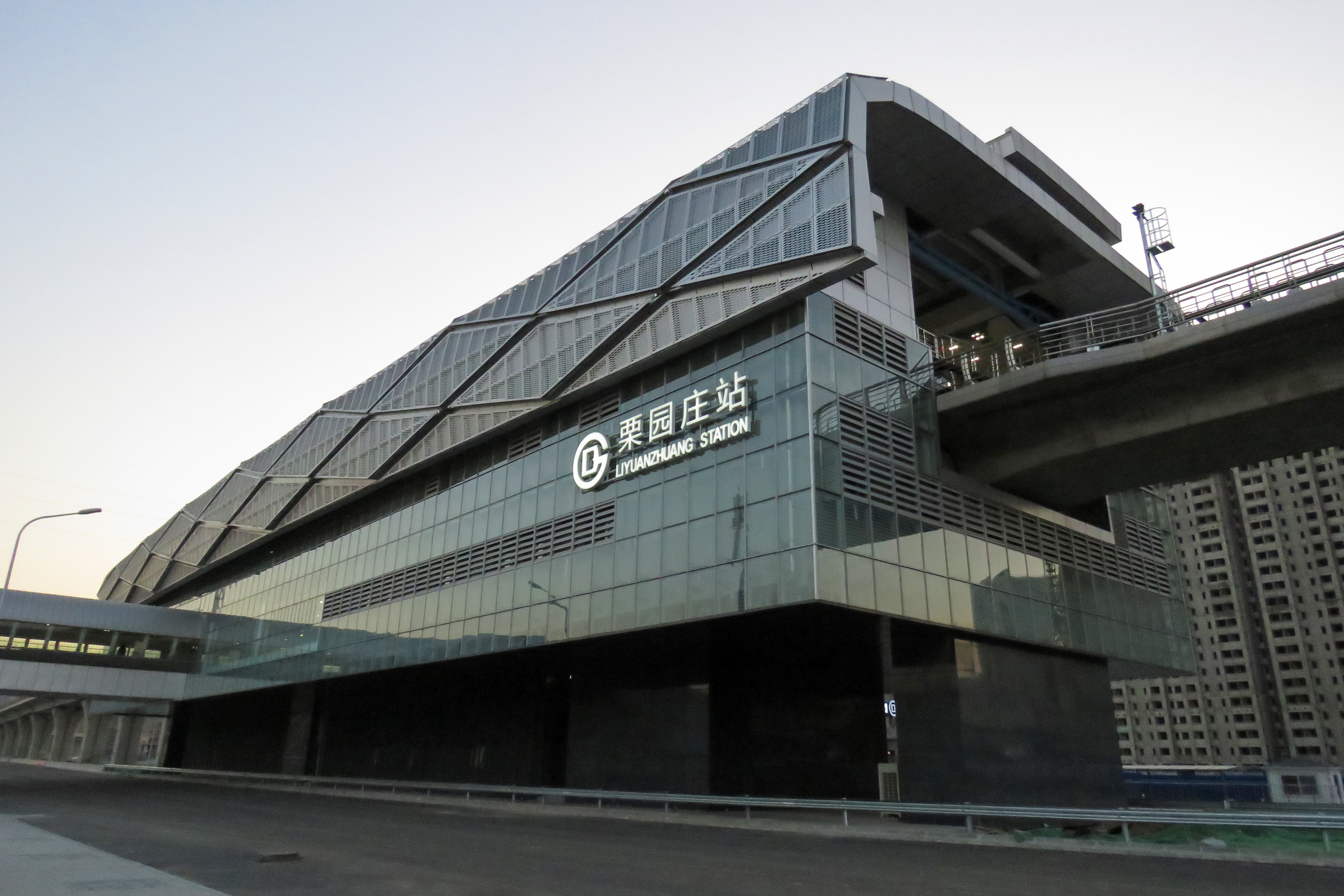
- East façade

General information
- Location: Liyuanzhuang, Yongding, Mentougou District, Beijing; China
- Coordinates: 39°53′45″N 116°07′24″E
- Operator: Beijing Mass Transit Railway Operation Corporation Limited
- Line: Line S1
- Platforms: 2 (2 side platforms)
- Tracks: 2

Construction
- Structure type: Elevated
- Accessible: Yes

History
- Opened: December 30, 2017

Services
Preceding station	Beijing Subway	Following station
Xiaoyuan towards Shichang	Line S1	Shang'an towards Pingguoyuan
Location
- Location within Beijing

Liyuanzhuang station (simplified Chinese: 栗园庄站; traditional Chinese: 栗園莊站; pinyin: Lìyuánzhuāng Zhàn) is a station on Line S1 of the Beijing Subway, it opened on 30 December 2017.

== Station layout ==
The station has 2 elevated side platforms.

== Exits ==
The station has 2 exits, lettered A and B. Both exits are accessible.
