= Shang'an station =

Beijing Subway station

Shang'an 上岸
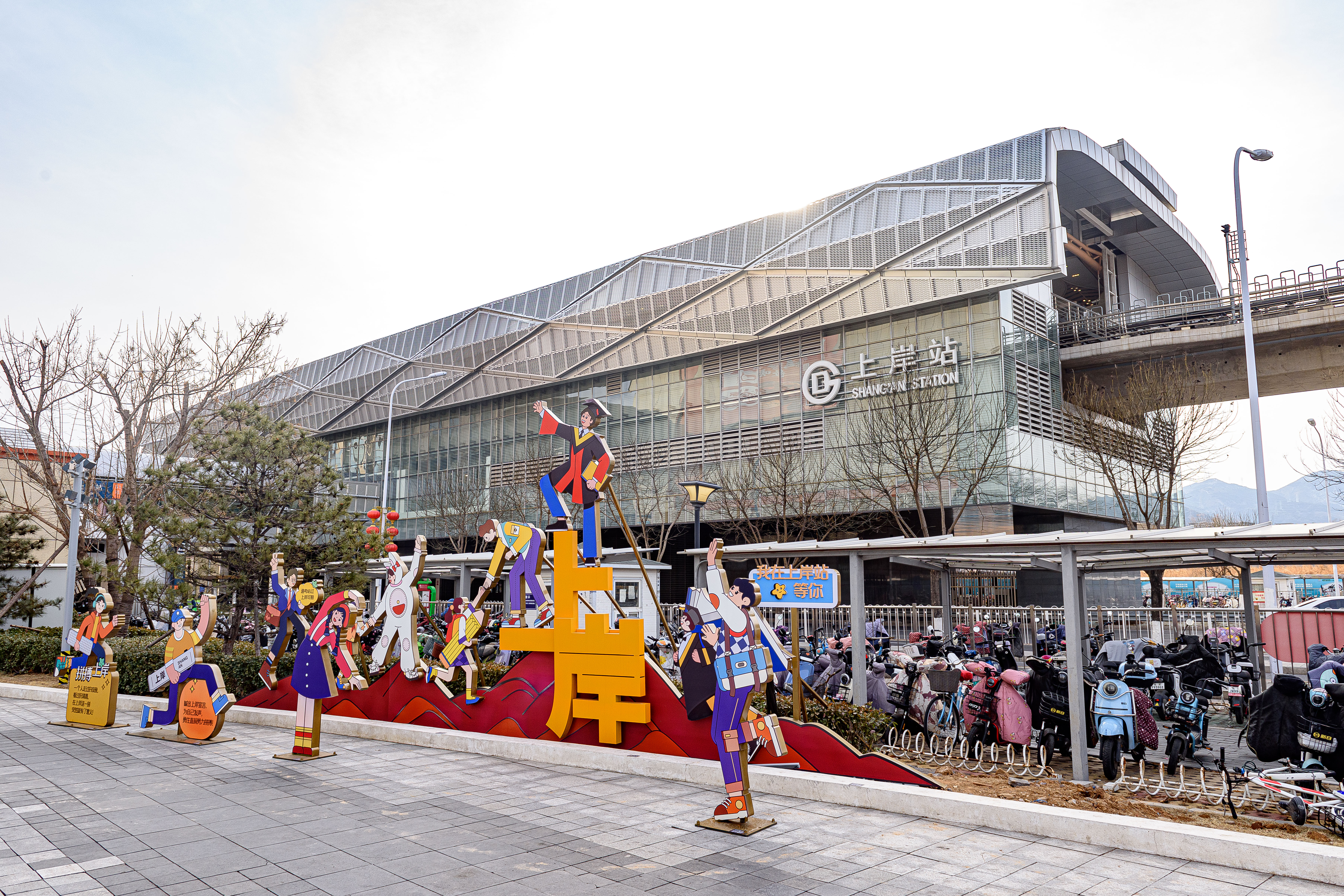
- Shang'an Station in February 2023, with special decorations outside

General information
- Location: Shang'an, Yongding, Mentougou District, Beijing; China
- Coordinates: 39°54′18″N 116°07′20″E
- Operator: Beijing Mass Transit Railway Operation Corporation Limited
- Line: Line S1
- Platforms: 2 (2 side platforms)
- Tracks: 2

Construction
- Structure type: Elevated
- Accessible: Yes

History
- Opened: December 30, 2017

Services
Preceding station	Beijing Subway	Following station
Liyuanzhuang towards Shichang	Line S1	Qiaohuying towards Pingguoyuan
Location
- Location within Beijing

Shang'an station (Chinese: 上岸站; pinyin: Shàng'àn Zhàn) is a station on Line S1 of the Beijing Subway, it was opened on 30 December 2017.

== Station layout ==
The station has 2 elevated side platforms.

== Exits ==
There are 2 exits, lettered A and B. Both exits are accessible.
