= Xiaoyuan station =

Beijing Subway station

Xiaoyuan 小园
- Xiaoyuan Station in September 2026

General information
- Location: Zijin Road (紫金路) and Longlin Road (龙林路); Xiaoyuan, Yongding, Mentougou District, Beijing; China
- Coordinates: 39°53′26″N 116°06′52″E
- Operator: Beijing Mass Transit Railway Operation Corporation Limited
- Line: Line S1
- Platforms: 2 (2 side platforms)
- Tracks: 2

Construction
- Structure type: Elevated
- Accessible: Yes

History
- Opened: 30 December 2017

Services
Preceding station	Beijing Subway	Following station
Shichang Terminus	Line S1	Liyuanzhuang towards Pingguoyuan
Location
- Location within Beijing

Xiaoyuan station (simplified Chinese: 小园站; traditional Chinese: 小園站; pinyin: Xiǎoyuán Zhàn) is a station on Line S1 of the Beijing Subway, it was opened on 30 December 2017.

== Station layout ==
The station has 2 elevated side platforms.

== Exits ==
There are 2 exits, lettered A and B. Both exits are accessible.
