= China Railways 22B rolling stock =

Chinese railway passenger coach

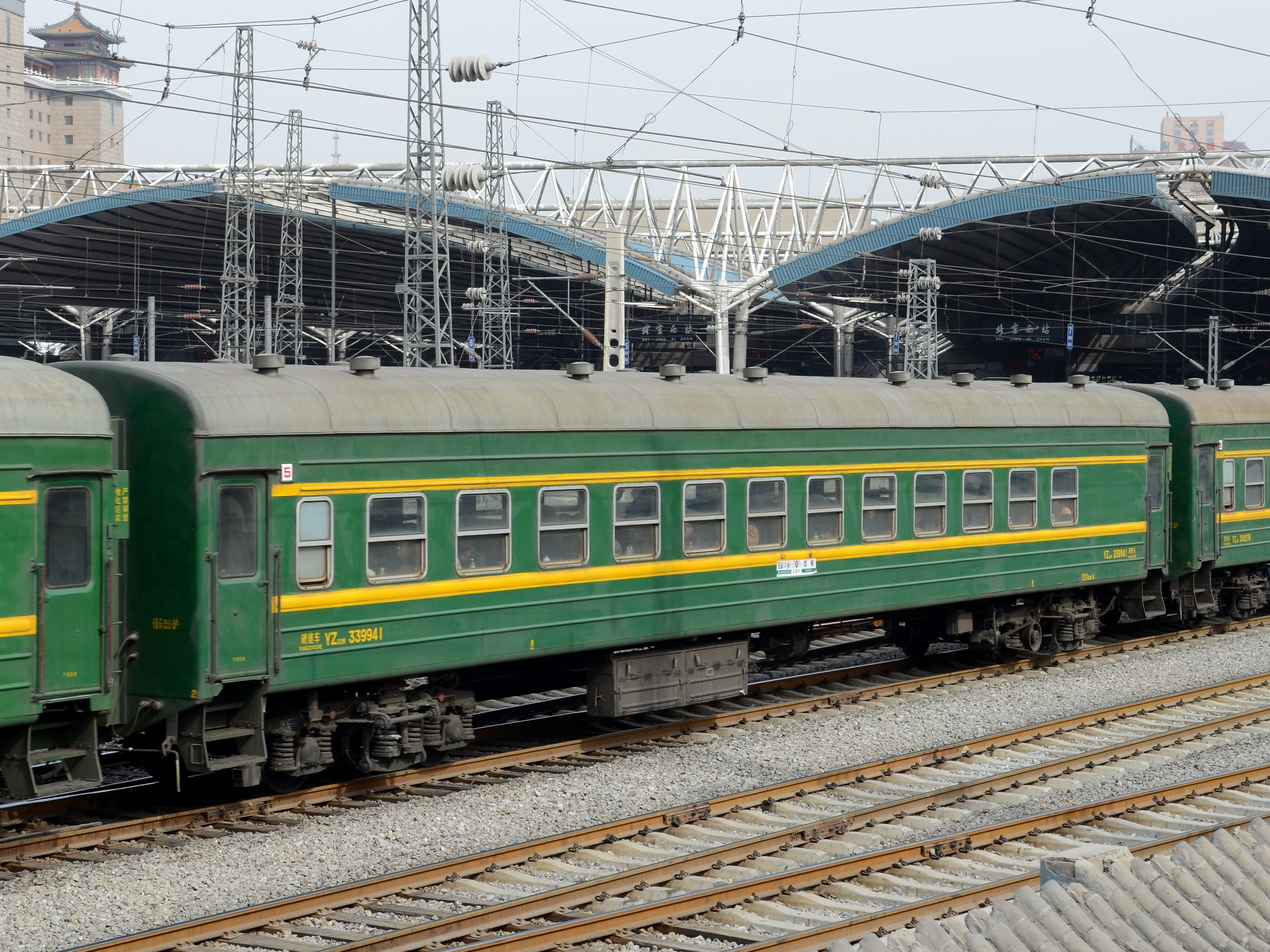
- YZ-22B "hard seat" coach
- In service: 1988-
- Manufacturer: Changchun Railway Vehicles
- Built at: Changchun; Tangshan
- Constructed: 1988–1994
- Operators: China Railways

Specifications
- Car body construction: Steel
- Car length: 23.6 metres (77 ft) (over body); 24.5 metres (80 ft) (over couplers)
- Width: 3.1 m (10 ft 2 in)
- Height: 4.28 m (14 ft 1 in)
- Maximum speed: 120 km/h (75 mph)
- Braking system(s): Disc and flange
- Coupling system: AAR couplers
- Track gauge: 1,435 mm (4 ft 8 1/2 in) standard gauge

China Railways 22B is a type of Chinese-built railway passenger coaches operated by China Railway. It is a variant of the Type 22 coach and has a maximum operating speed of 120 km/h (75 mph).

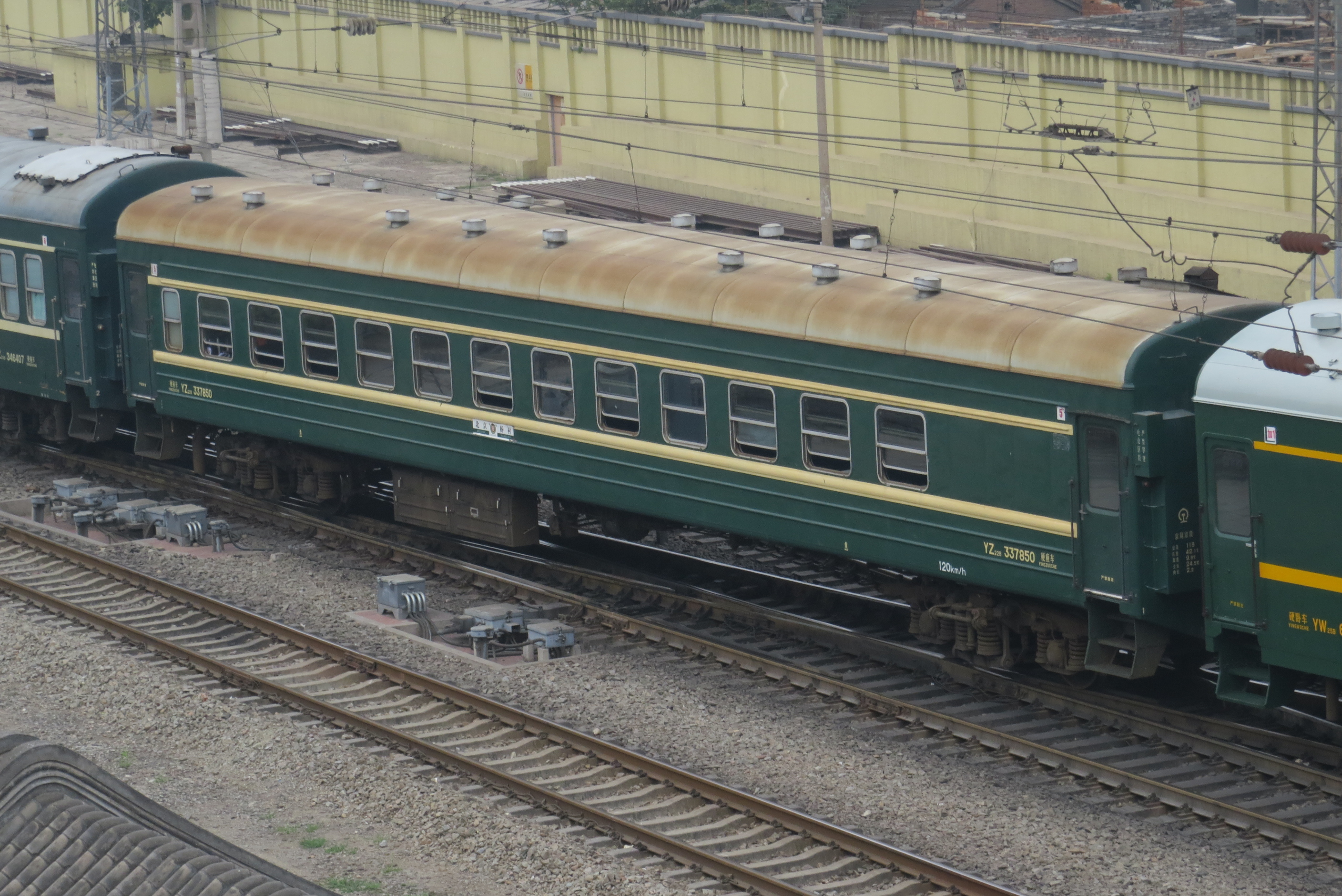
Exterior

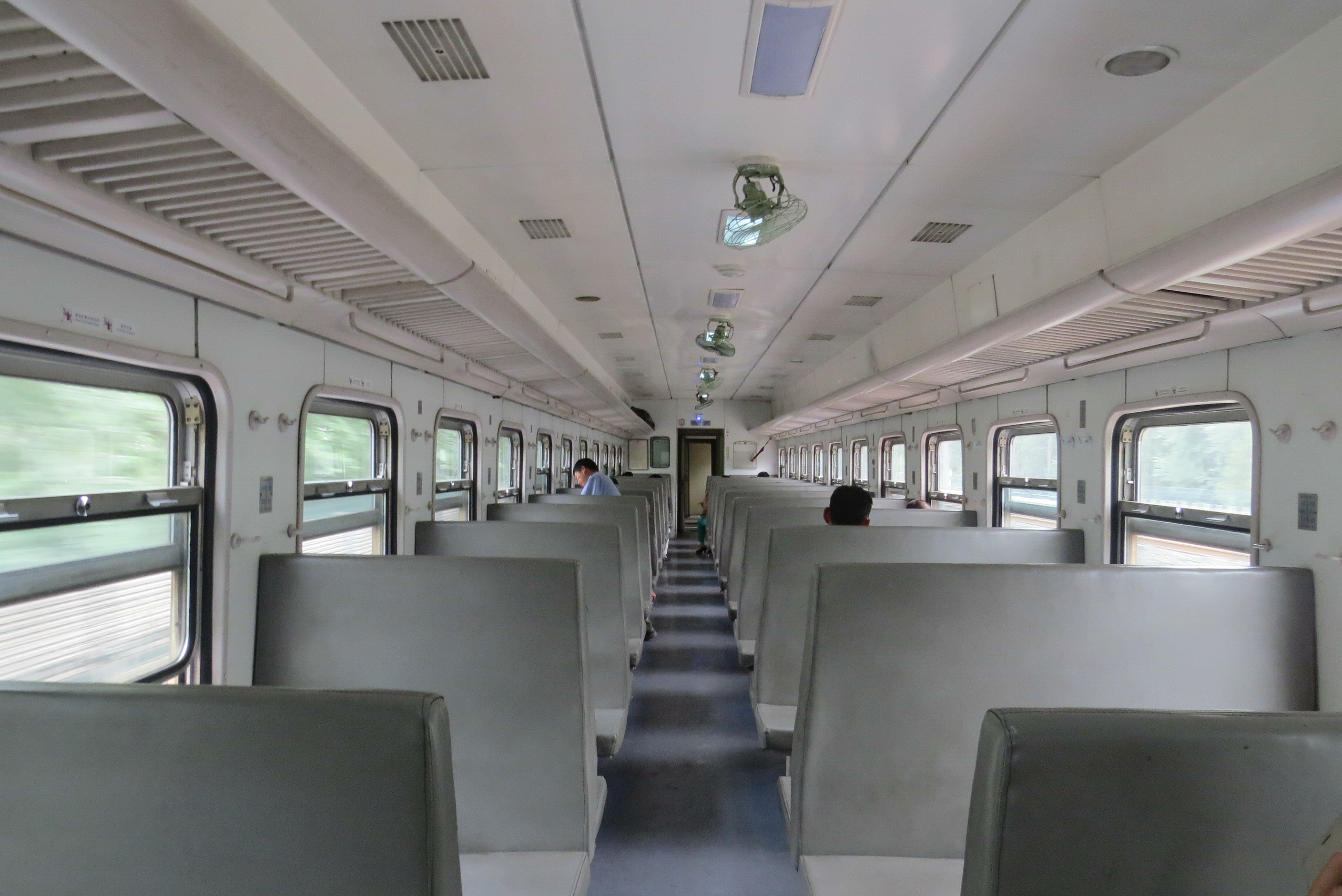
Interior

== See also ==
- China Railways Type 23 rolling stock
