= China Railways Type 23 rolling stock =

Chinese rail carriage

China Railways Type 23 Carriage
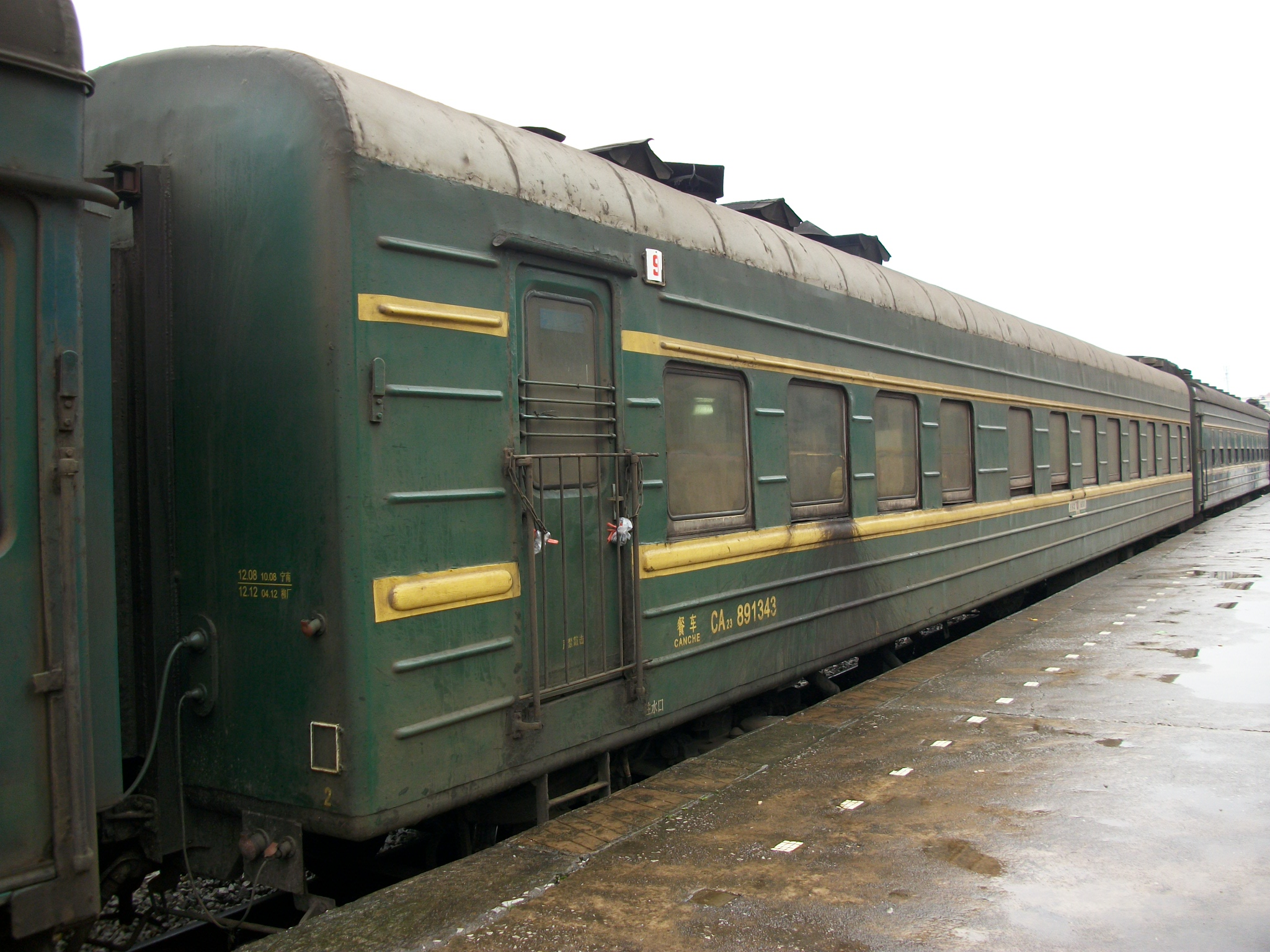
- A CA23 type restaurant car
- Manufacturer: Nanjing Puzhen Rolling Stock; Tangshan Locomotive; Sifang Locomotive and Rolling Stock; Changchun Railway Vehicles
- Family name: China Railways Type 22 carriage
- Constructed: 1960–?
- Fleet numbers: YZ23, CA23

The China Railways Type 23 are a group of somewhat related carriages that are a class of the China Railways Type 22 carriage series, as they were a series of derivative carriages from the Type 22, rather than an independent class of carriages.

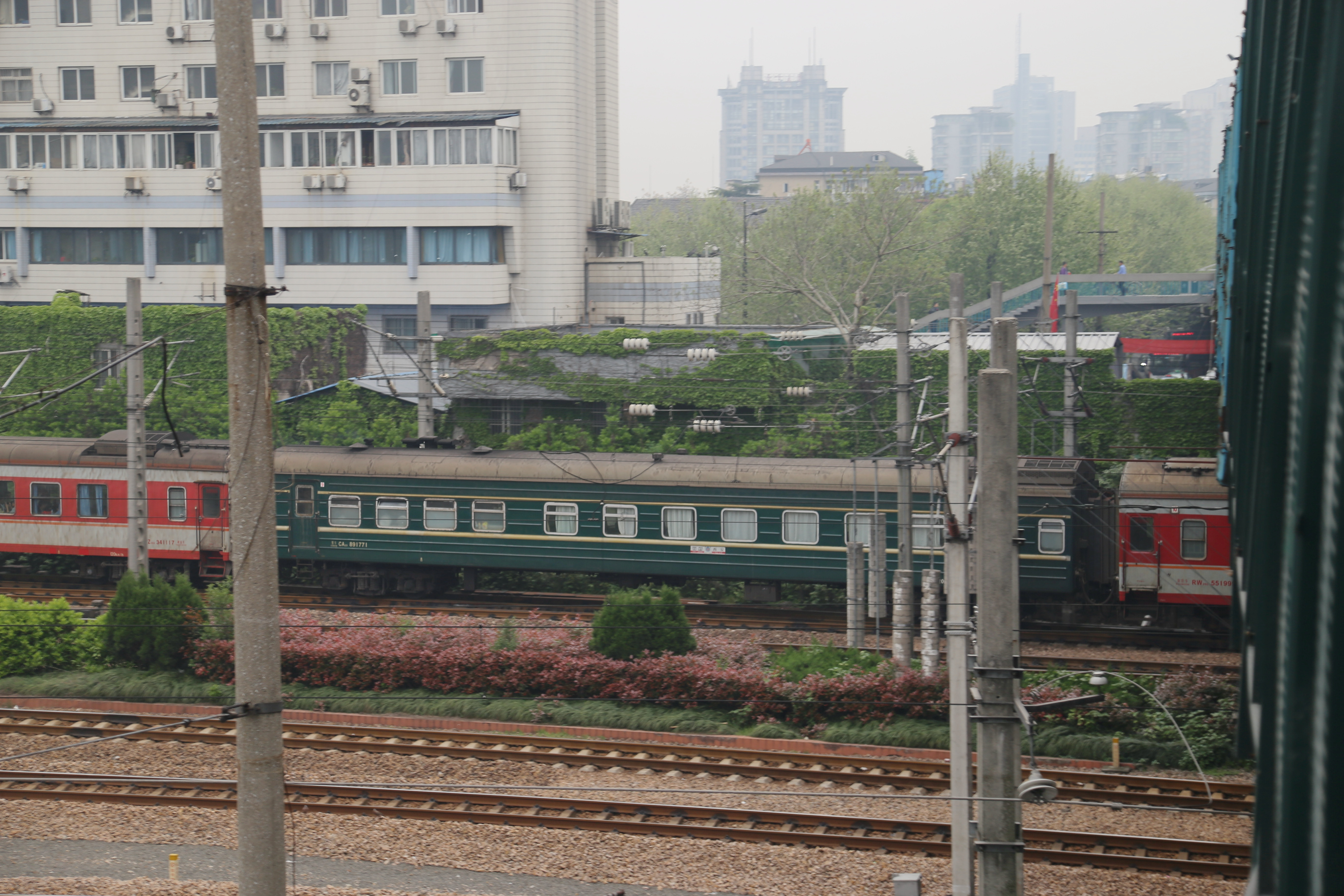
A CA23 restaurant car in service K2906

== Overview ==
Towards the end of the 1950s, the type 22 carriage started entering services with the Chinese railways. In 1960, this carriage was improved upon by Qingdao Sifang by improving the hard seat type 22 carriage, mainly by changing the heating on the carriage from circulating heated water to using pressurised steam for heating; this modification was named the YZ23 hard seater car, with a capacity of 122 passengers, an improvement of two over the type 22 carriage. In 1962, however, both the type 22 and 23 passenger cars received some minor revision, reducing the seating on the YZ23 to 120. This was again reduced in another revision in 1970, to a capacity of 116. In these revisions, the YZ23 also changed its bogie, from initially the model 202, then the model 203 and finally the model 205. In 1968, some YZ23 hard seaters were converted to dual use sleeper and seater cars.

In 1961, Changchun Railway Vehicles delivered a different design of the passenger car, also registered as type 23 to the southern regions of China. The roof received an additional panel, which allows air to circulate from roof mechanical mounted ventilators, and cooling equipment was fitted to reduce the temperature of air flowing into the carriage. Two showers were added at each end of the carriage, and the seating arrangement was changed to two by two seating, reducing the capacity to 96 people.

However, the type 23 restaurant car, the CA23 is not a modification of either type 23 car; instead, it is modified from the type 22 restaurant car (CA22), which was designed by Sifang. The CA23 restaurant car used the model 205 bogies and had a weight of 48 to 50 tons. These blueprints were passed on to Tangshan Locomotive in 1963, which then modified the existing design by adding a counter and a refrigerator room, creating the CA23 car. This design was further improved in 1969 by Nanjing Puzhen, adding doors at either end of the carriage and changing the windows to a top opening window. Yet another unrelated design was created in 1966 by Tangshan Locomotive, with their CA23 car having air conditioning. These cars were used on the Guangshen railway, and had a capacity of 30 people.

== See also ==
- China Railways Type 22B rolling stock
