= Line S1 (Beijing Subway) =

Maglev line in Beijing, China

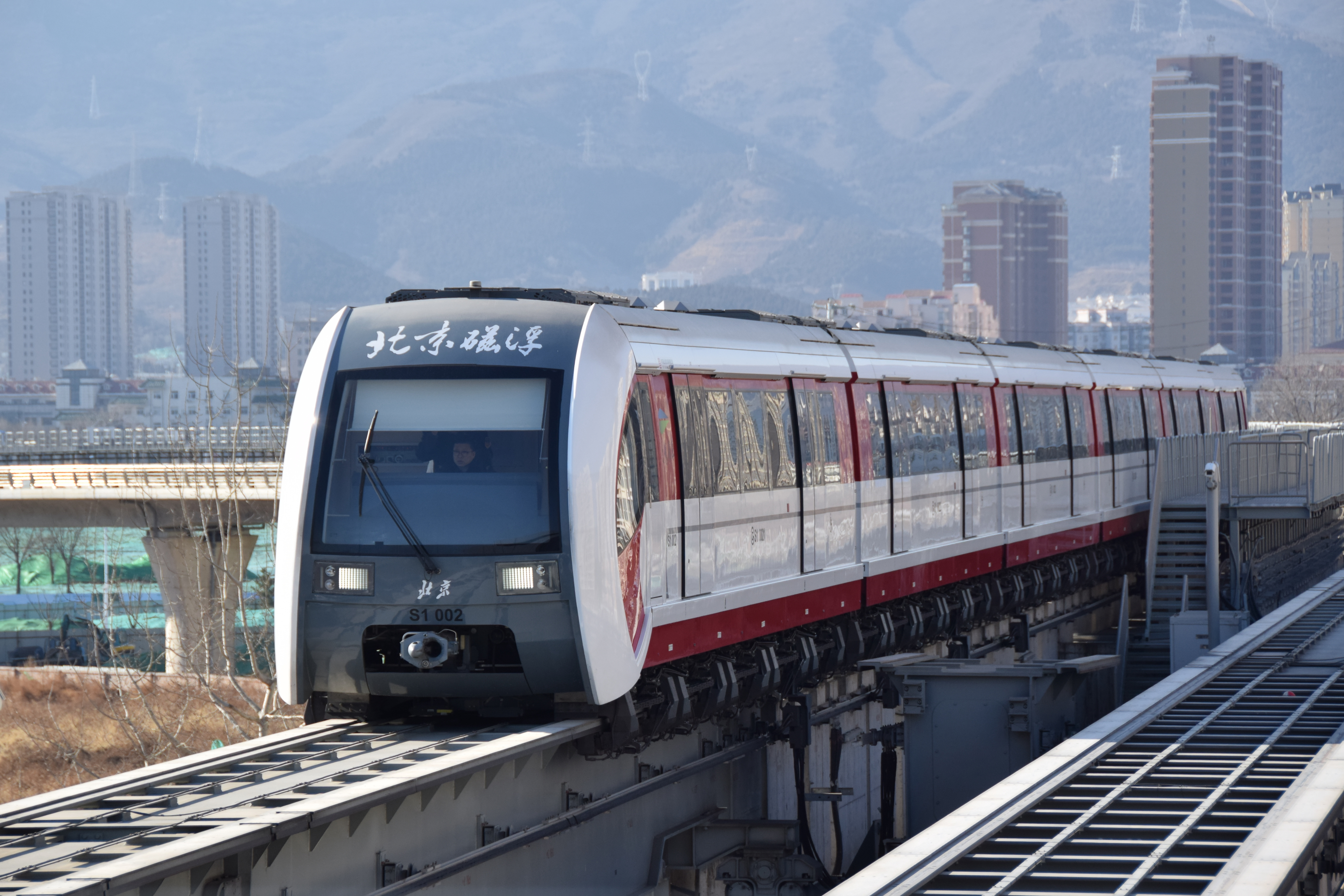
- A line S1 train arriving Qiaohuying station

Overview
- Other names: M26 (planned name); Line 26; Mentougou Line; Datai Line; Beijing Low-speed Maglev; Beijing Maglev
- Status: Operational
- Locale: Shijingshan and Mentougou districts Beijing
- Termini: Shichang; Pingguoyuan
- Stations: 8

Service
- Type: Rapid Transit, Maglev
- System: Beijing Subway
- Operator: Beijing Mass Transit Railway Operation Co., Ltd
- Depot: Shimenying

History
- Opened: 30 December 2017; 8 years ago

Technical
- Line length: 10.2 km (6.3 mi)
- Electrification: 1,500 V DC third rail linear motor
- Operating speed: 100 km/h (62 mph)

Line S1 (Chinese: 北京地铁S1线; pinyin: běijīng dìtiě S-yī xiàn) of the Beijing Subway is a medium-low speed maglev line. It is operated by the Beijing Mass Transit Railway Operation Corporation Limited. The line was opened on 30 December 2017. It starts from Pingguoyuan in Shijingshan District and goes west towards Shichang in Mentougou District.

== Description ==
The line uses a medium-low speed magnetic levitation technology which can give a top speed of 105 km/h (65 mph). The actual operating speed of the line is either 80 or 100 km/h (50 or 62 mph).

The line is 10.236 km (6.360 mi) long, with 9.953 km (6.185 mi) elevated and 0.283 km (0.176 mi) underground. There are eight stations.

Six-coach maglev trains were built by the CRRC Tangshan, a subsidiary of CRRC. It is China's third commercial maglev train in operation. Line S1 is part of Beijing's attempts to tackle environmental problems caused by heavy car use, coal burning and fast urbanization by upgrading its urban rail systems.

The Line S1 designation is a holdover from a defunct plan to build several suburban railway lines in Beijing. Line S1 was envisioned to reuse the Jingmen Railway connecting Cishousi station to Mentougou District. That plan was abandoned and the section between Pingguoyuan and Cishousi stations was replaced with Phase 3 of Line 6, and the other section was replaced with today's Maglev S1 Line.

== History ==
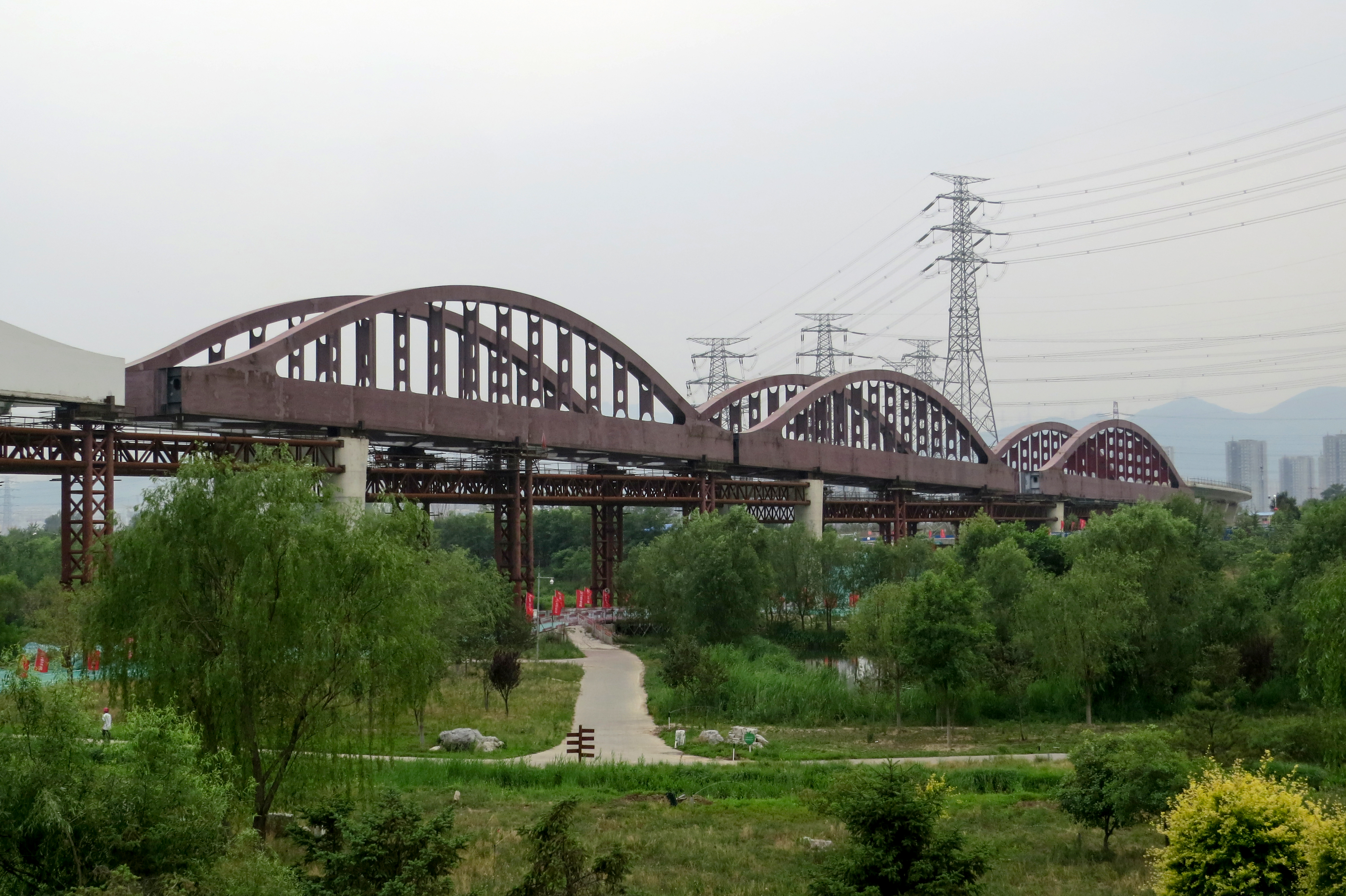
The under construction Yongding River Bridge of Line S1.

Construction of the line began on 20 April 2015. The line was completed west of the Yongding River on 31 March 2017, and the initial section from Jin'anqiao to Shichang opened on 30 December 2017.

When the Line S1 originally opened in 2017, it was not connected to the rest of the subway network. With the opening of Line 6 Phase 3 on 30 December 2018, passengers can transfer to Line 6 at Jin'anqiao.

In July 2021, a major bridge was completed, and the opening of the extension to Pingguoyuan planned for the end of the year. The extension opened on 31 December 2021.

Segment	Commencement	Length	Station(s)	Name
Jin'anqiao — Shichang	30 December 2017	8.216 km (5.105 mi)	7	Initial Section
Jin'anqiao — Pingguoyuan	31 December 2021	1.419 km (0.9 mi)	1	Remaining Section

== Stations ==
Station Name		Connections	Nearby Bus Stops	Distance km		Location
English	Chinese	Connections	Nearby Bus Stops	Distance km		Location
Shichang	石厂		931 948 959 960 M26 M32 M42 M44 通医专线8	0.000	0.000	Mentougou
Xiaoyuan	小园		890 890区 903 960 965 981 快速直达专线68 快速直达专线107 快速直达专线139 M1 M26 M27 M41 M42 M44 通医专线8	1.297	1.297	Mentougou
Liyuanzhuang	栗园庄		941 981 快速直达专线213 M1 M24 M25 M27 M42 M44 通医专线8	1.266	2.563	Mentougou
Shang'an	上岸		903 992 快速直达专线208 快速直达专线222 M1 M25 M27 M41 M43 M44 专218	1.044	3.607	Mentougou
Qiaohuying	桥户营		903 快速直达专线208 M25 M41	1.065	4.672	Mentougou
Sidao Qiao	四道桥		941 快速直达专线204 M24	0.834	5.506	Mentougou
Jin'anqiao	金安桥	6 11	325 336 337 358 370 396 472 489 502 892 920 921 929 931 932 941 941快 948 959 961 977 977快 981 BRT4(快速公交4) 快速直达专线135 快速直达专线142 快速直达专线150 M3 M4 M5 M6 M7 M11 M16 M20 M22 专61 专110 专148 专198	2.710	8.216	Shijingshan
Pingguoyuan	苹果园	1 6	325 336 358 370 396 399 472 527 597 892 920 929 931 932 941快 948 961 972 977 977快 981 M3 M4 M5 M6 M7 M11 M16 M20 M22	1.419	9.635	Shijingshan

== Rolling Stock ==
Being the only maglev line, the rolling stock is incompatible with any other line in the system. The rolling stock was made by CRRC Tangshan. Trains consist of 6 cars, with the train as a whole being 89 meters (292 ft 0 in) long and 3 meters (9 ft 10 in) wide. The top speed of the trains is 105 km/h (65 mph), with the operating speed being either 80 or 100 km/h (50 or 62 mph).
