= Ghana Railways 1300 series DMUs =

Ghanaian diesel multiple unit

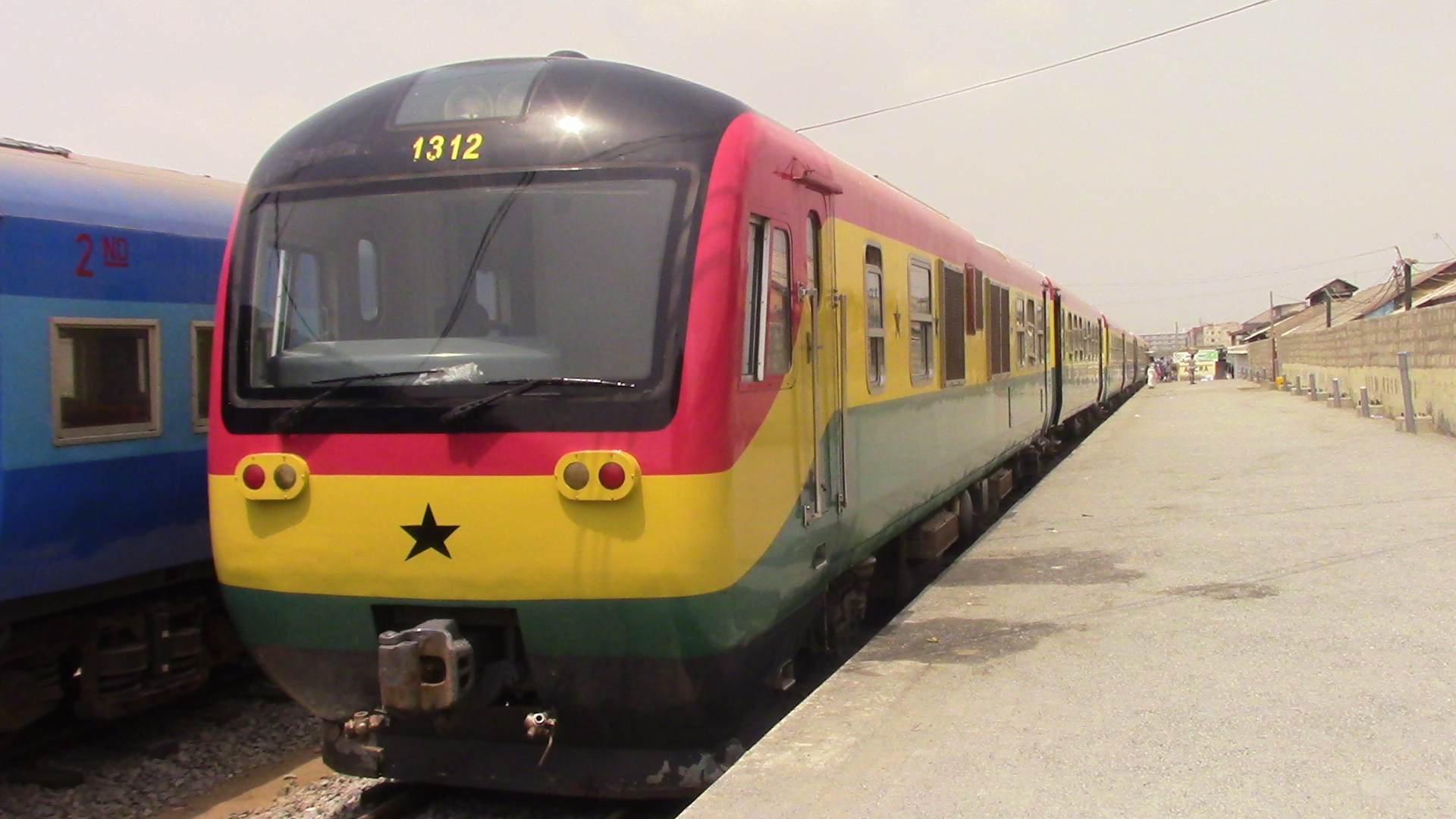
- Ghana railways 1307–1312 in Accra
- Stock type: Diesel multiple unit
- Manufacturer: CRRC Tangshan
- Replaced: Locomotive-hauled trains
- Constructed: 2009
- Entered service: October 2010
- Number built: 2
- Formation: 6 cars
- Fleet numbers: 1301–1306; 1307–1312
- Capacity: 668
- Operator: Ghana Railway Company
- Depot: Tema Maintenance Yard
- Line served: Achimota–Tema

Specifications
- Train length: 108.4 metres (356 ft)
- Width: 2,650 millimetres (8 ft 8 in)
- Floor height: 1,130 millimetres (3 ft 8 in)
- Doors: Automatic sliding-plug
- Wheel diameter: 700–640 millimetres (28–25 in)
- Maximum speed: 90 kilometres per hour (56 mph) (Design speed); 80 kilometres per hour (50 mph) (Operational speed)
- Weight: 254 tonnes (560,000 lb); 48 tonnes (106,000 lb) (Motor car); 39.5 tonnes (87,000 lb) (Trailer car)
- Axle load: 14 tonnes (31,000 lb)
- Power output: 2x 618 kW (2x 828 hp)
- Tractive effort: 145 kN (33,000 lbf) (Starting)
- Transmission: AC-DC-AC Electric
- Acceleration: 0.55 m/s2
- Deceleration: 0.83~1.11 m/s2
- Braking system: Air
- Track gauge: 1,067 mm (3 ft 6 in)

Ghana railways 1300 series DMUs are Ghanaian diesel-electric multiple units manufactured by CRRC Tangshan in China for Ghana Railway Company in Ghana, they are designed for shuttle service between Accra and Tema on the Achimota–Tema branchline.

In 2008, GRC ordered two diesel multiple units from China CNR Corporation's Tangshan plant for 23 million dollars to replace locomotive-hauled trains, they were built in 2009 and were shipped from the Chinese port of Tianjin. Both multiple units entered service in October 2010. In July 2022, the multiple units ceased operation due to the railway line being suspended temporarily for rehabilitation works.

== Design ==
The diesel multiple unit is formed of 6 cars (2 being motor cars of Bo'Bo' axle arrangement and 4 being trailer cars), the model of a motor car is TWD161 and the model of a trailer car is TWD162. Each motor car is provided with a driver's cab, a control room, a power room, a cooling room and a passenger saloon, and each trailer car is provided with semi-cushioned seats, movable windows, automatic sliding-plug doors and end doors.

The multiple unit adopts an AC-DC-AC electric transmission, with each unit compromising traction converters from Vossloh Kiepe, traction motors and gear boxes from Voith, and the diesel engine from CAT. Traction bogies with solid wheelsets, air-spring bolsters, rubber axle box guides, axle hung traction motors and hollow shaft drive gear box structures are mounted on the underbody of each car, and traction converters are mounted beneath underframes of each motor car. A diesel engine and a generator are installed in the power room of each motor car, featuring a transmission mode of "one of two". A total capacity of a fuel tank is approximately 750 liters and the power output of each diesel engine is 618 kW (828 horsepower) at 1800 rpm. The maximum design speed of the multiple unit is 90 km/h (56 mph) while the maximum operational speed is 80 km/h (50 mph).

The total weight of the multiple unit is 254 tonnes (560,000 lb) (48 tonnes (106,000 lb) for the motor car, and 39.5 tonnes (87,000 lb) for the trailer car), the axle load is 14 tonnes (31,000 lb). It is 108.4 m (356 ft) long and 2,650 mm (8 ft 8 in) wide, the wheel diameter is 700 mm (28 in) wide (640 mm (25 in) for worn out). The car body is a carbon steel structure.

The key techniques used on the multiple unit includes:

- a microcomputer control technique
- performance matching technique for traction power system
- stabilizing technique for traction control system
- applied technique of AC drive mode
- development techniques for power performance and track adaptability of traction and trailing bogies
- anticorrosion and coating techniques

== Accidents and incidents ==
- On 23 October 2017, at around 7:30 am, 1301–1306 series multiple unit at Alajo in Accra derailed off the tracks, the cause of the derailment remained unknown. 3 passengers sustained minor injuries.
