= CRRC Tangshan high-speed freight train =

World's fastest cargo electric multiple unit

CRRC Tangshan High-speed Freight Train
- Manufacturer: CRRC
- Built at: CRRC Tangshan
- Constructed: 2020-Present
- Capacity: 110 metric tons

Specifications
- Maximum speed: 350 km/h (220 mph)

CRRC Tangshan unveiled the prototype high-speed freight electric multiple unit in December 2020, with top speeds of 350 km/h (220 mph).

== Design ==
The prototype builds on a temporarily rebuilt CR400BF passenger trainset (used for Alibaba's Single's Day shopping festival in November 2020), with purpose-built 2.9m doors, accommodating two rows of containers with roller floors.

The train's design based on a passenger train resulted in an 85% utility rate for cargo, with 800 m^{2} of usable floor space. The train is designed to handle temperatures from -25 to 40 degrees Celsius.

The train was designed using biomimicry to resemble a Chinese sturgeon, which is claimed to reduce air resistance.
