= CRRC Tangshan =

Chinese train manufacturer

CRRC Tangshan Co., Ltd.
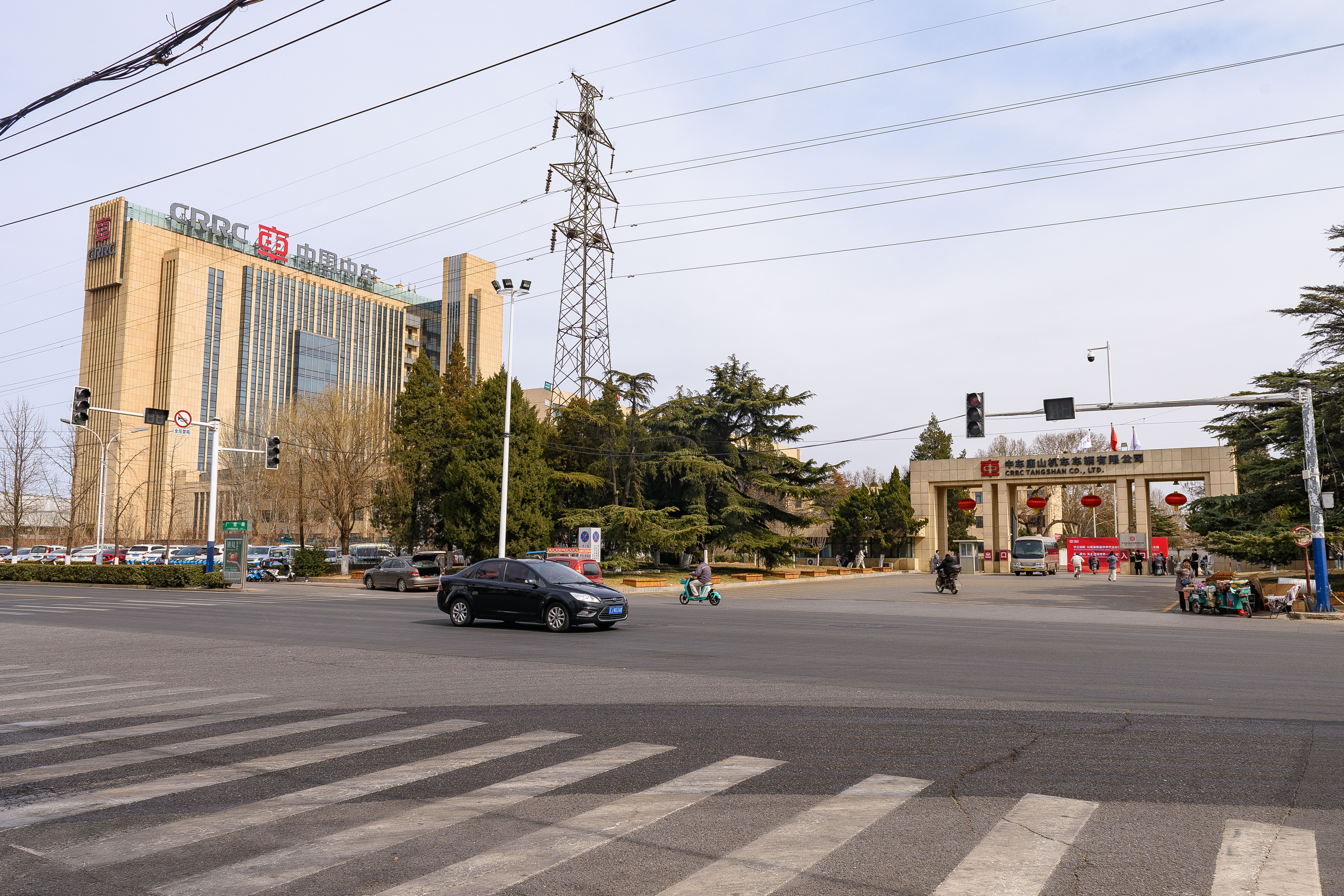
- Native name: 中车唐山机车车辆有限公司
- Formerly: Tangshan Railway Vehicle
- Type: Subsidiary
- Industry: Manufacturing
- Predecessor: Tangshan Locomotive and Rolling Stock Works
- Founded: 1881 (predecessor); 10 July 2007; 19 years ago (date of incorporation)
- Headquarters: Tangshan, China
- Products: locomotive; rolling stock; metro coaches
- Owner: CRRC (100%)
- Parent: CRRC
- Divisions: in Tianjin, Zhengzhou
- Subsidiaries: in Quanzhou
- Website: crrcgc.cc/ts

CRRC Tangshan
- Simplified Chinese: 中车唐山机车车辆有限公司
- Traditional Chinese: 中車唐山機車車輛有限公司
- Literal meaning: CRRC Tangshan Locomotive and Rolling Stock Co., Ltd.
Transcriptions
Standard Mandarin
- Hanyu Pinyin: Zhōngchē Tángshān Jīchē Chēliàng Yǒuxiàn Gōngsī

Tangshan Railway Vehicle Co., Ltd.
- Simplified Chinese: 唐山轨道客车有限責任公司
Transcriptions

CRRC Tangshan Co., Ltd., is a manufacturer of rolling stock located in Tangshan, Hebei province, People's Republic of China. While Datong built mainline steam locomotives until 1988, Tangshan built steam for industrial use until 1999, becoming the last works in the world to build steam for non-tourist use.

== History ==
The predecessor of the subsidiary, Tangshan Locomotive and Rolling Stock Works was founded before the establishment of the People's Republic of China in 1949. It was nationalized and remaining as an entity of the Ministry of Railways until 2002, when it was a manufacturing facility of China National Railway Locomotive & Rolling Stock Industry Corporation (LORIC). In 2002, LORIC was split into CNR Group and CSR Group, which Tangshan works belonged to the former due to geographical location. CNR Group and CSR Group also belonged to newly established State-owned Assets Supervision and Administration Commission, another department of the State Council.

Due to the initial public offering of China CNR, the assets of the works was injected to a newly incorporated subsidiary, which was known as Tangshan Railway Vehicle Co., Ltd..

In November 2005, CNR Group signed a 669 million euro agreement with Siemens under CEO Klaus Kleinfeld that gave them access to the intellectual property jewels of the latter. The first of these trains were to run in 2008 on the Beijing-Tianjin route. Only the first three of 60 trains were to be built in Germany. The balance were built at the plant which is now named CRRC Tangshan.

After the merger of CSR and CNR to CRRC, the subsidiary also renamed to Chinese: 中车唐山机车车辆有限公司; lit. 'CRRC Tangshan Locomotive and Rolling Stock Co.', 'Ltd.', known as just CRRC Tangshan Co., Ltd. in English.

== Products ==
=== Steam locomotives ===
- "Rocket of China", first locomotive built in China (1881)
- China Railways SY (from 1960 to 1999)

Two tourist railways in the United States own Tangshan steam locomotives – The New York, Susquehanna and Western Technical and Historical Society (on the Belvidere and Delaware River Railway) and the Valley Railroad.

=== Diesel locomotives ===
- China Railways DF5

=== Passenger coaches ===
- 25B
- 25G
- 25K
- 25T

=== Multiple units ===
- TSD09
- CRH3, Chinese version of the Siemens Velaro train set
- Ghana Railways 1300 series DMUs using Voith transmissions for suburban use with Ghana Railway Corporation.
- 20 DMU for Bangladesh (2011)
- Unidad de tren diésel CNR for Trenes Argentinos
- High-speed freight train

==== Metro ====
- Tianjin Metro line 1
- Fuzhou Metro line 1
- Shijiazhuang Metro line 1
- Xiamen Metro

==== Intercity commuter rail ====
- CRHCJ-2
- CRHCJ-3
- CR200J

==== Regional rail ====
- Bi-Level cars for RTM in Montreal, Canada and SEPTA Regional Rail in Southeastern Pennsylvania (SEPTA order cancelled in April 2024)

=== LRV ===
- Changchun Tram licensed from Siemens Mobility
- Samsun Tram, Turkey
- İzmir Metro, Turkey
- Porto Metro, Portugal

=== Maglev ===
- Line S1 (Beijing Subway) Medium-low Speed Maglev
