= Shichang station =

Beijing Subway station

Shichang 石厂
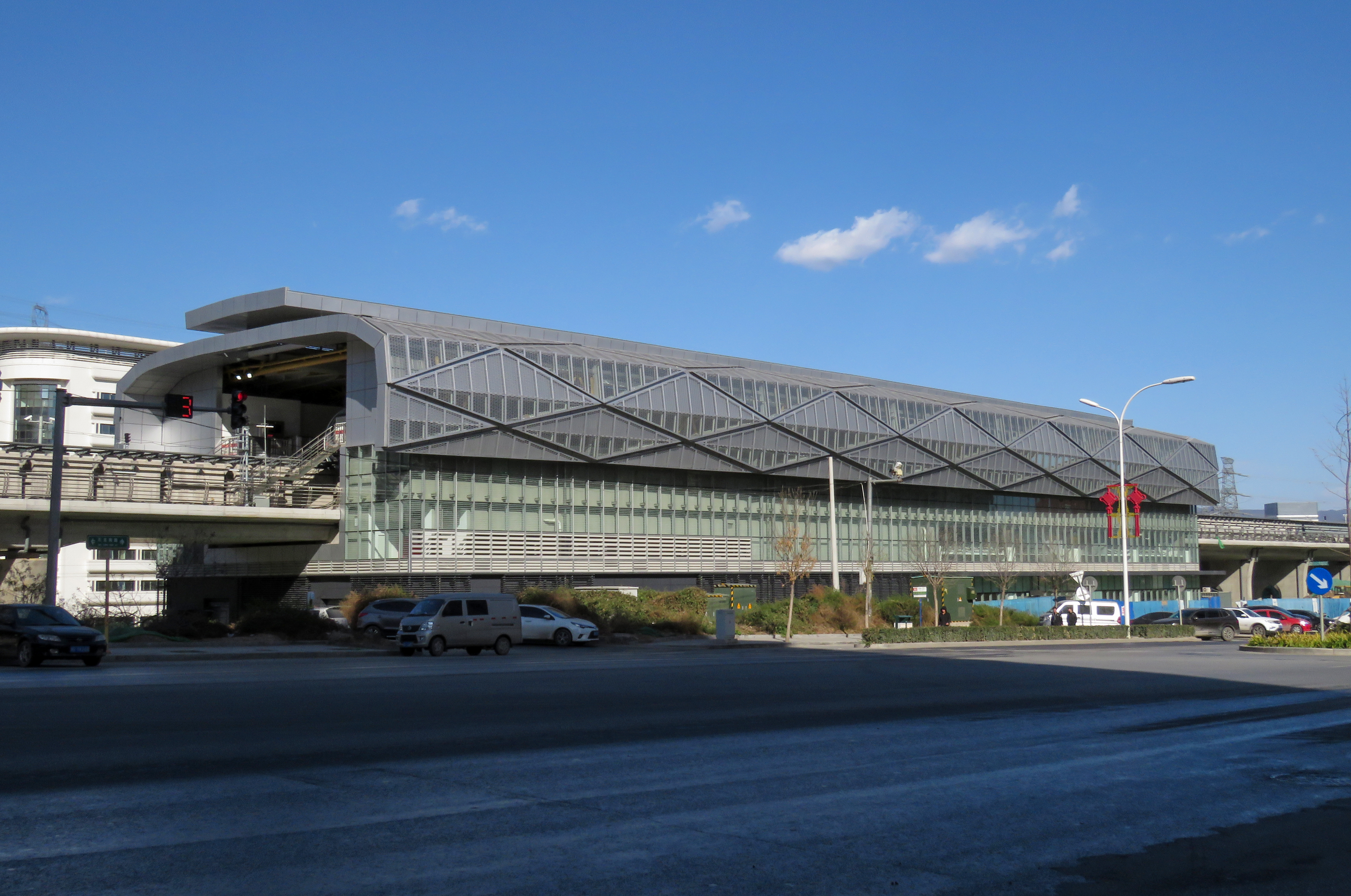
- Shichang Station in November 2017

General information
- Other names: Shimenying (石门营) (construction name)
- Location: Shichang Village, Yongding Town, Mentougou District, Beijing; China
- Coordinates: 39°53′22″N 116°06′01″E
- Operator: Beijing Mass Transit Railway Operation Corporation Limited
- Line: Line S1
- Platforms: 2 (2 side platforms)
- Tracks: 2

Construction
- Structure type: Elevated
- Accessible: Yes

History
- Opened: 30 December 2017

Services
Preceding station	Beijing Subway	Following station
Terminus	Line S1	Xiaoyuan towards Pingguoyuan
Location
- Location within Beijing

Shichang station (simplified Chinese: 石厂站; traditional Chinese: 石廠站; pinyin: Shíchǎng Zhàn) is a station on and the western terminus of Line S1 of the Beijing Subway, it was opened on 30 December 2017.

== Station layout ==
The station has 2 elevated side platforms.

== Exits ==
There are 2 exits, lettered A and B. Both exits are accessible.

== Gallery ==
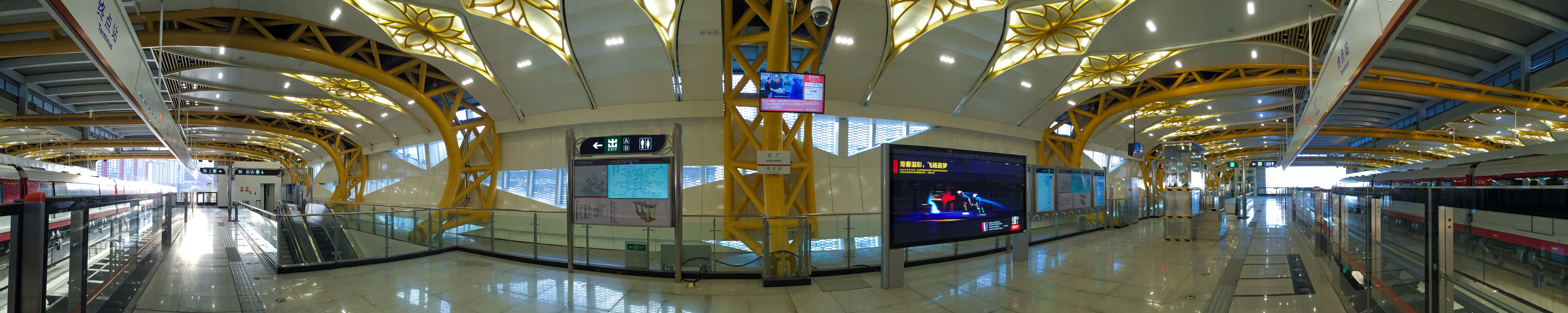
Panorama of terminus platform (January 2018)
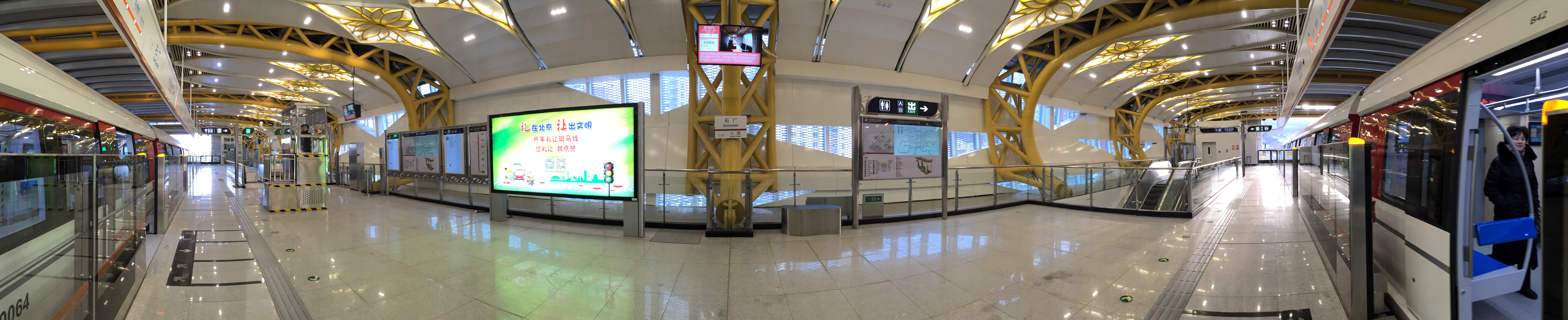
Panorama of eastbound platform (January 2018)
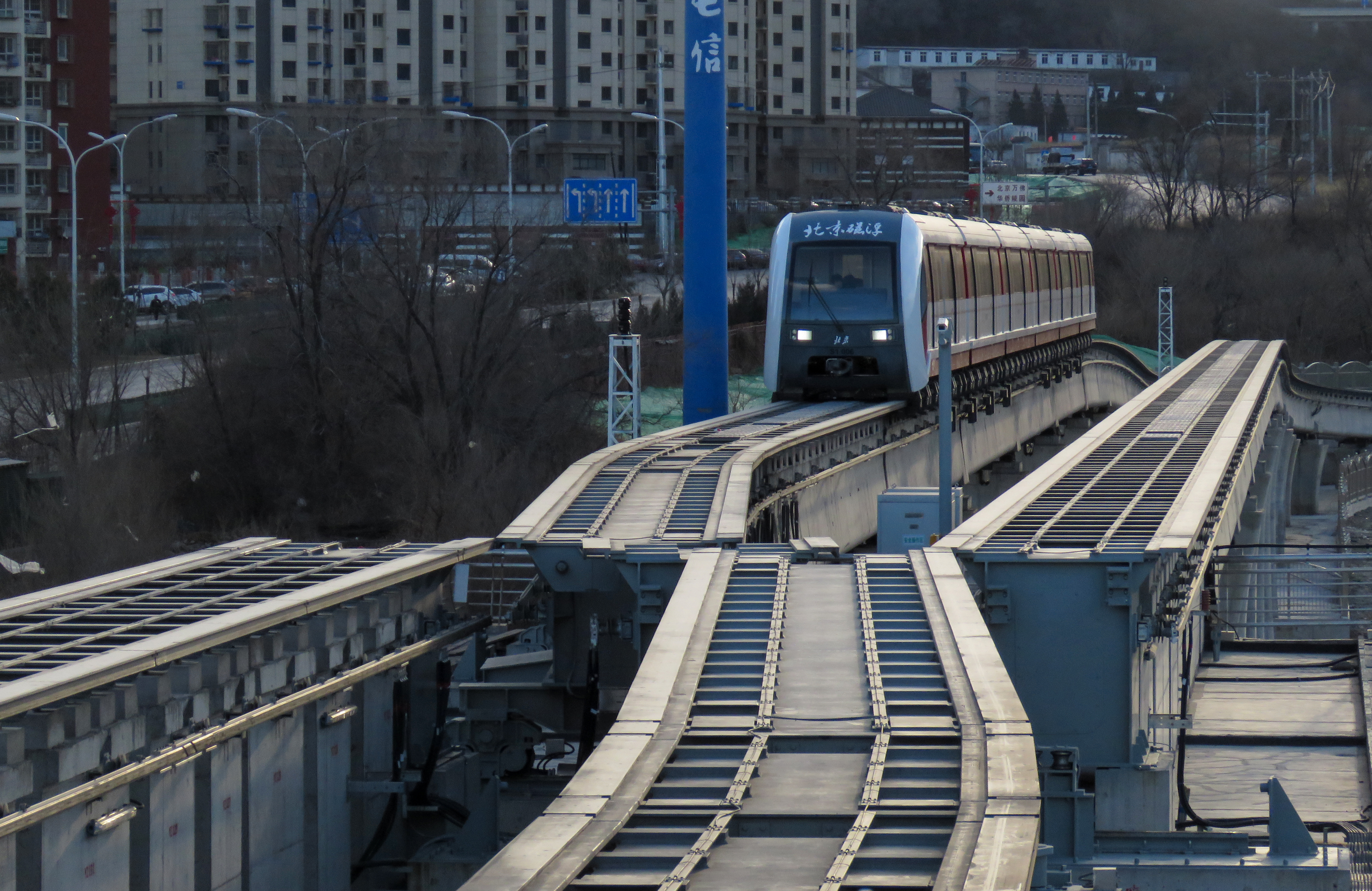
Track transfer for trains turning around behind Shichang station (January 2018)

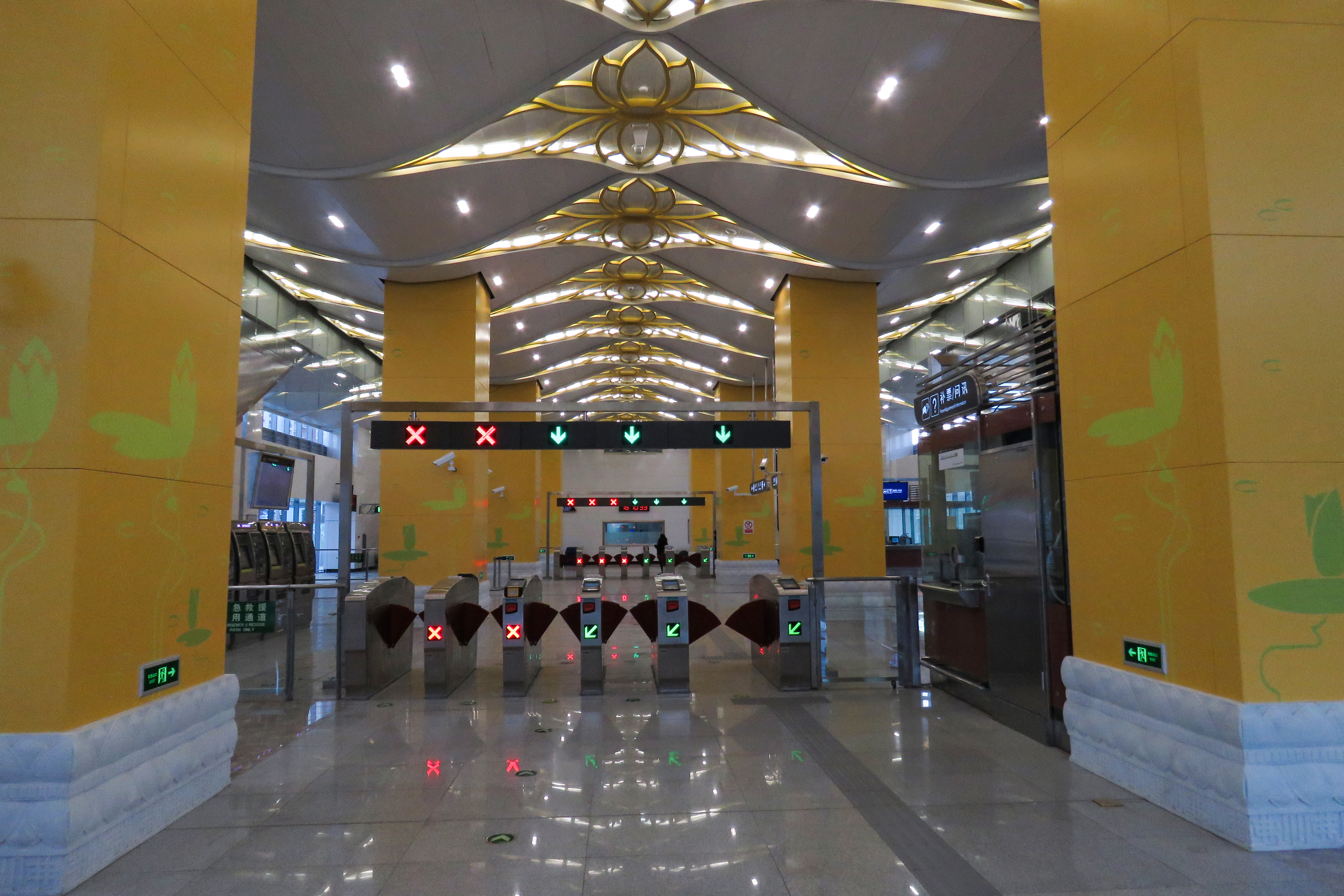
Turnstiles and concourse of Shichang station (January 2018)
