= Pingguoyuan station =

Beijing Subway station

Pingguoyuan 苹果园
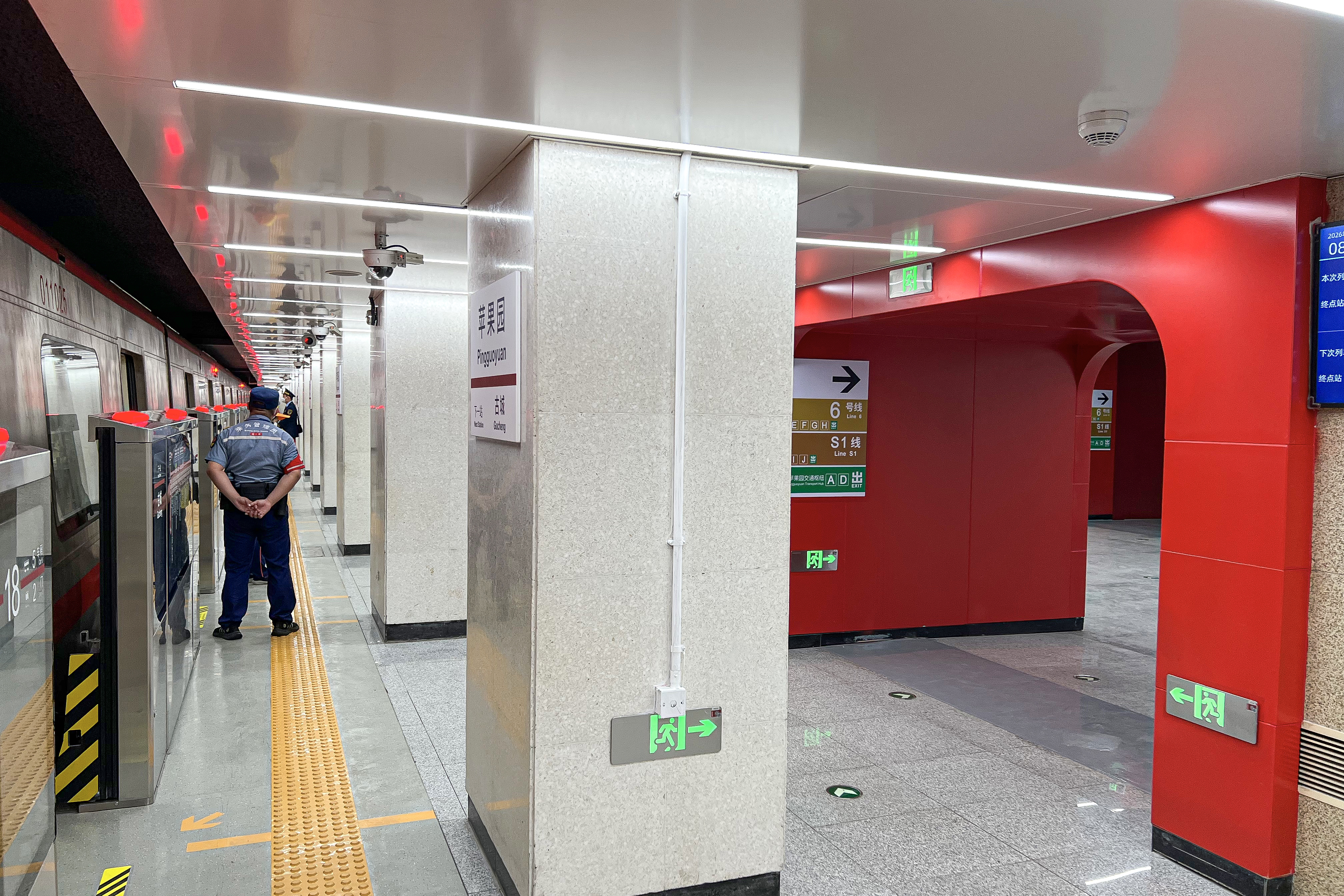
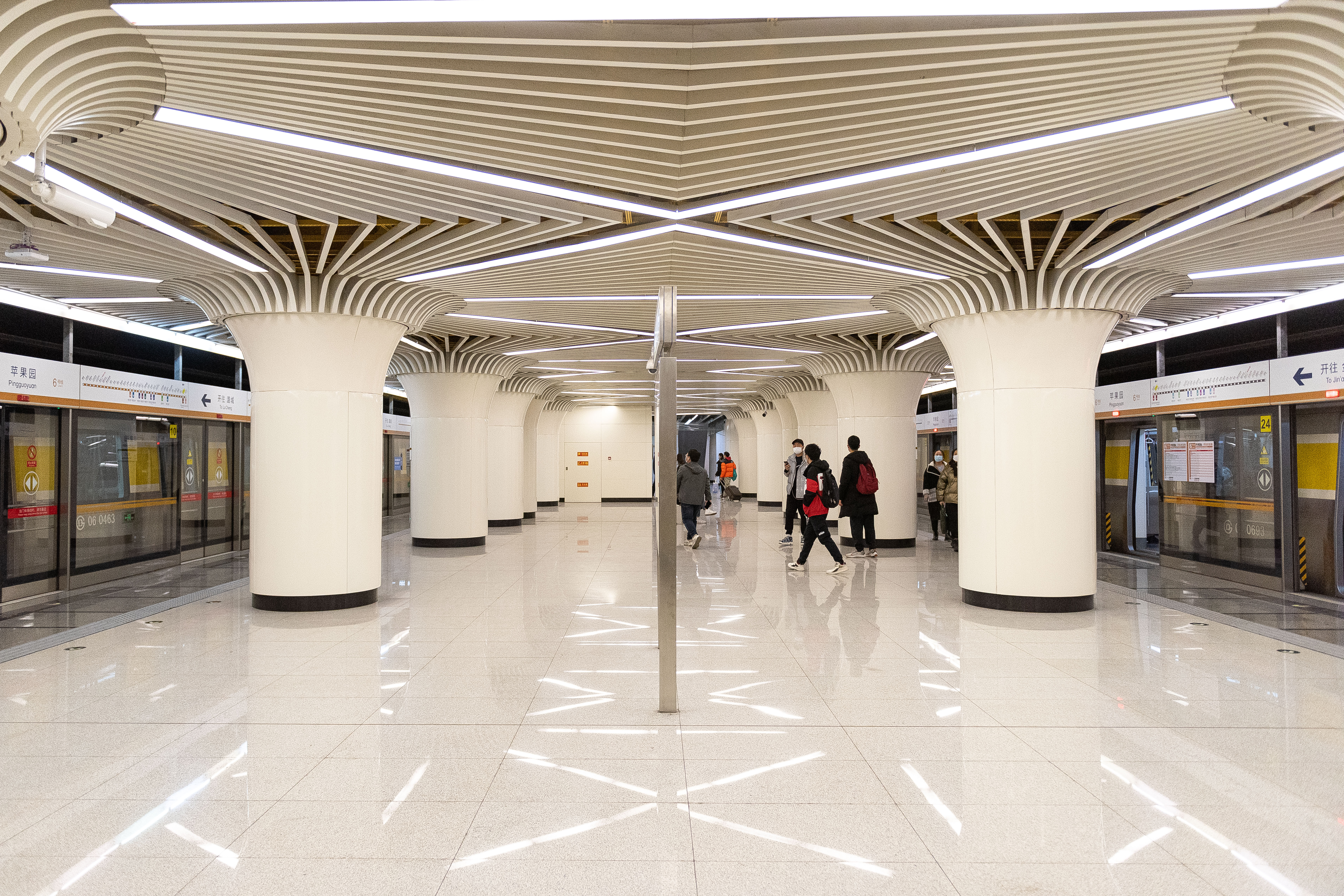
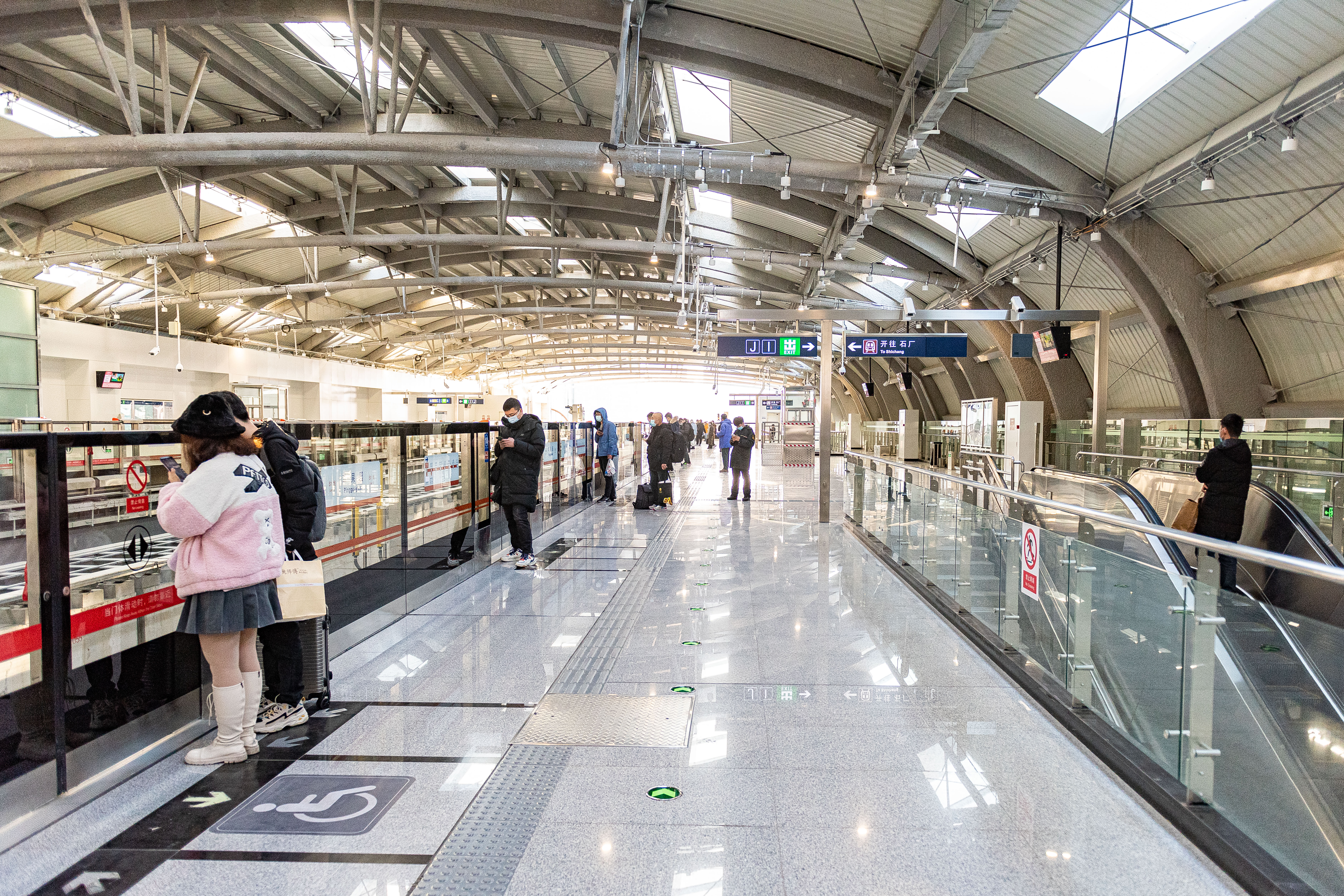
- Line 1 platform Line 6 platform Line S1 originating platform

General information
- Location: Pingguoyuan South Road (苹果园南路); Pingguoyuan Subdistrict, Shijingshan District, Beijing; China
- Coordinates: 39°55′36″N 116°10′39″E
- Operator: Beijing Mass Transit Railway Operation Corp., Ltd
- Lines: Line 1 Line 6 Line S1
- Platforms: 6 (1 island platform and 4 side platforms)
- Tracks: 6

Construction
- Structure type: Underground (Line 1 & Line 6); Elevated (Line S1)
- Accessible: Yes

Other information
- Status: in service
- Station code: 103 (Line 1)

History
- Opened: April 23, 1973; 53 years ago (Line 1; initial); December 31, 2021; 4 years ago (Lines 6 and S1); May 16, 2026; 3 months ago (Line 1; reopen)
- Closed: April 18, 2020; 6 years ago (Line 1)

Services
Preceding station	Beijing Subway	Following station
Terminus	Line 1	Gucheng towards Universal Resort
Jin'anqiao Terminus	Line 6	Yangzhuang towards Luyang
Jin'anqiao towards Shichang	Line S1	Terminus
Under renovation
Fushouling Terminus	Line 1 Projected to reopen 2027+	Gucheng towards Universal Resort
Location
- Location within Beijing

Pingguoyuan station (Chinese: 苹果园站; pinyin: Píngguǒyuán zhàn) is a station on Line 1, Line 6 and Line S1 of the Beijing Subway, located in Pingguoyuan Subdistrict, Shijingshan District, Beijing.

The station for Line 1 was opened on April 23, 1973. Pingguoyuan station on Line 1 closed for renovation on April 18, 2020 and reopened on May 16, 2026, as part of renovation and integration of Pingguoyuan Transit Terminal. The station for Line 6 and Line S1 was opened on December 31, 2021.

The Line 1 station and Line 6 station are underground, and the Line S1 station is elevated.

== Station layout ==
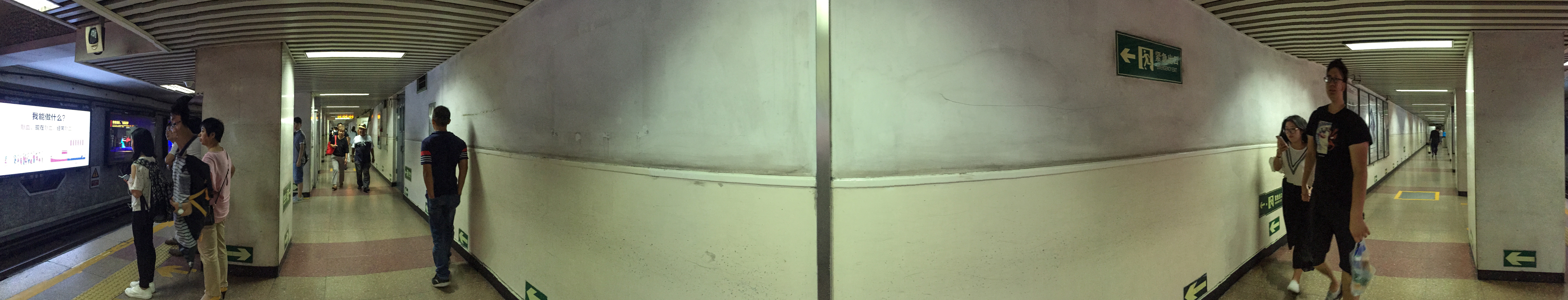
Platform panorama of pre-renovated ine 1 Pingguoyuan station.

The line 1 of Pingguoyuan station has two underground side platforms. Both were the only two platforms in the Beijing Subway that didn't have platform gates installed when the station closed on April 18, 2020 due to the aging of platform devices. The platform gates were installed after the station reopened.

Line 6 has an underground island platform and Line S1 has 2 elevated side platforms.

== Exits ==
There are 11 exits, lettered A, B, C, D, E, F, G, H, I and J.

Prior of the renovation of Line 1, there are four exit lettered A, B, C and D. Exit A and B are connected to platform towards to Universal Resort station, and Exit C and D are connected to terminus platform. Following the renovation of Line 1 platform, Exit A and B are merged into the new exit A, and exit C and D are merged into new exit B. The exit C and D are reassign to new-build exits connect to Pingguoyuan Transit Terminal.

The exit E, F, G and H are connected to Line 6's platform, and exit I and J are connected to Line S1's platform. Exit E, F, H, I and J are opened on 31 December 2021 with extension of Line 6 and Line 1, and Exit G is opened on 26 May 2026 with reopening of Line 1 platform.

For accessibility entrance, Exit A, B and G are accessible via elevators, and exit F and H have stairlifts. One extra unlettered exit connect between Line 1 platform and Pingguohui Shopping Mall, is accessible via elevator.

== Gallery ==
=== Line 1 ===
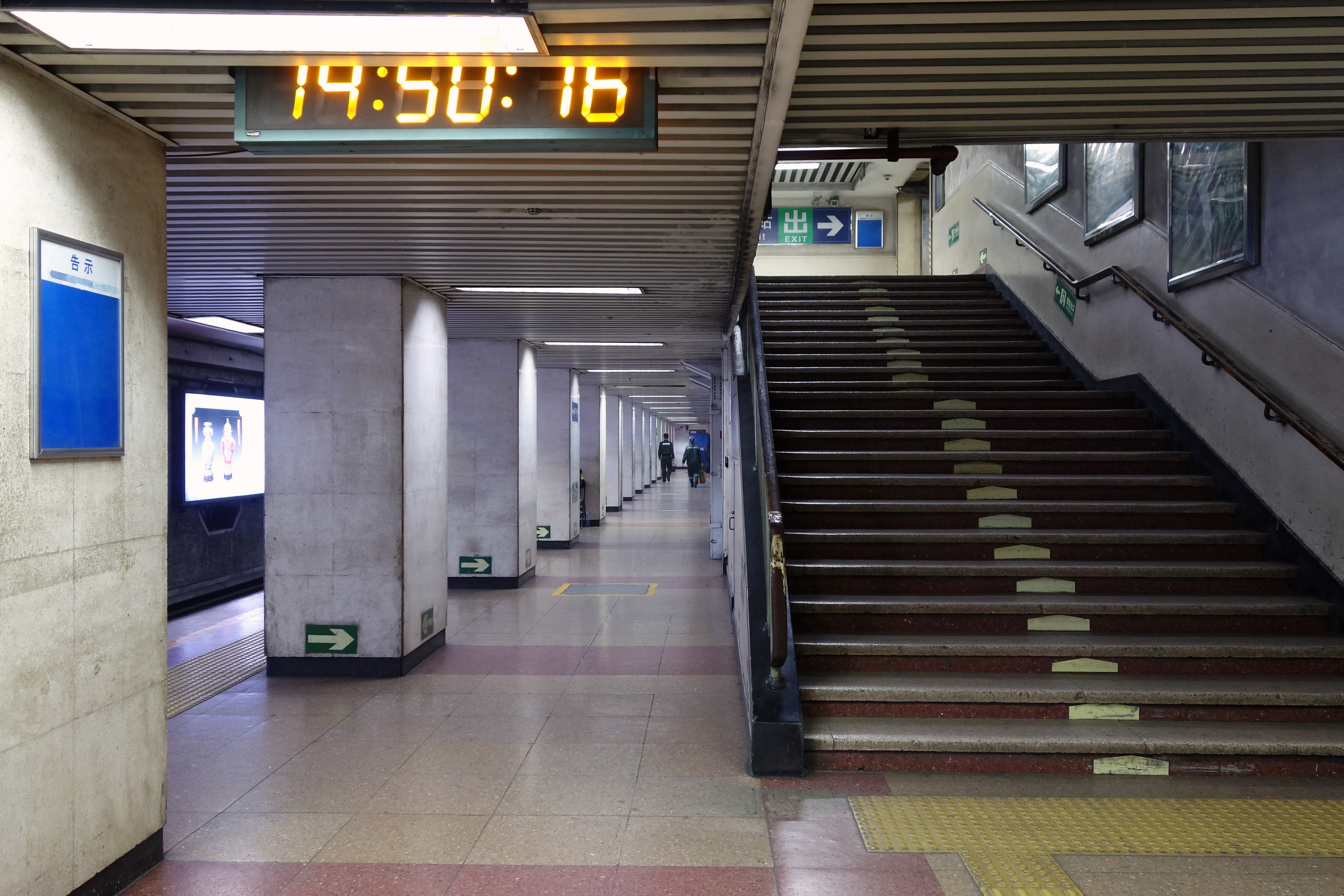
Pre-renovated station platform with exit stairs

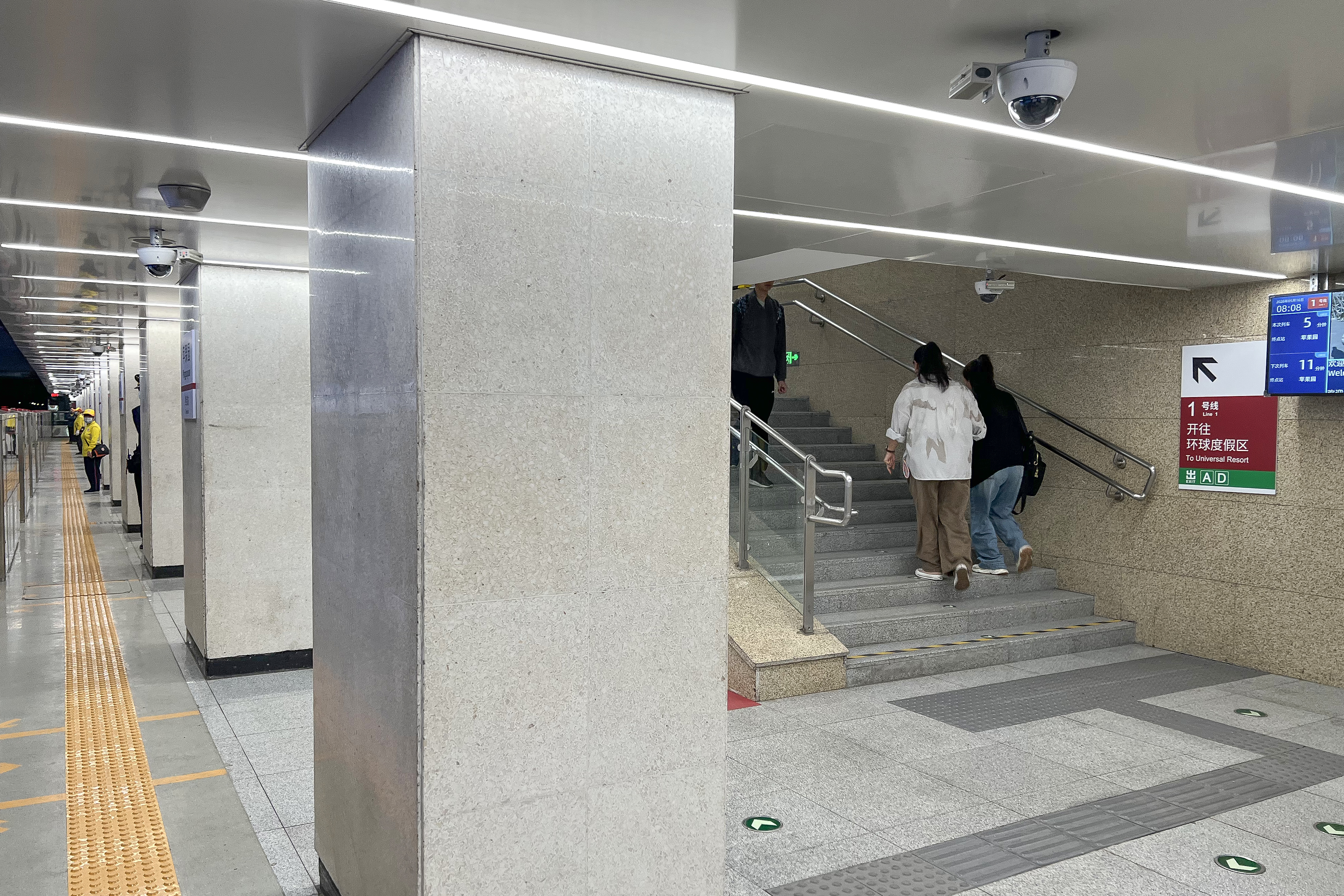
Post-renovated station platform with same exit stairs, now repurposed as passenger direction-change walkway

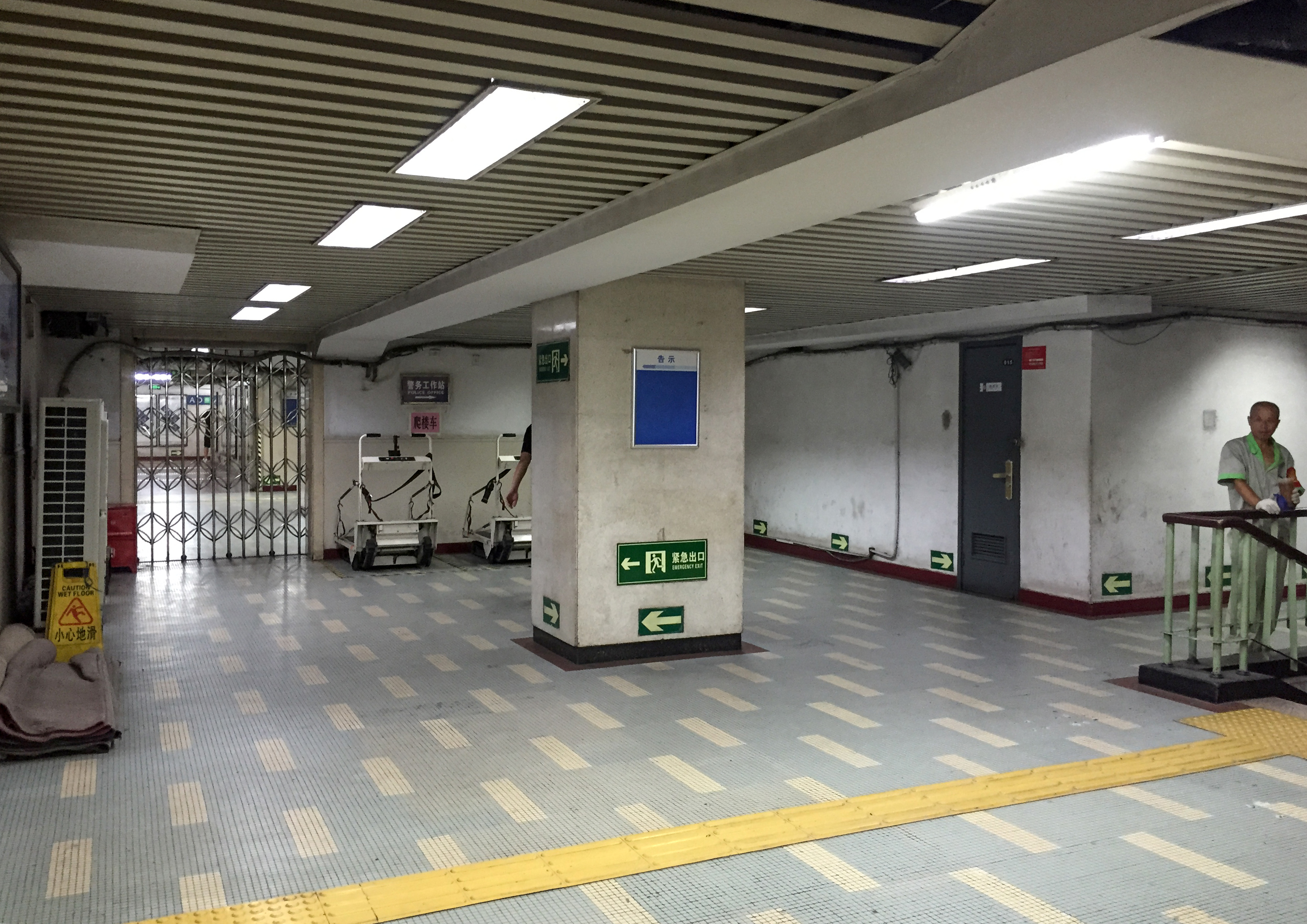
Pre-renovated Mezzanine

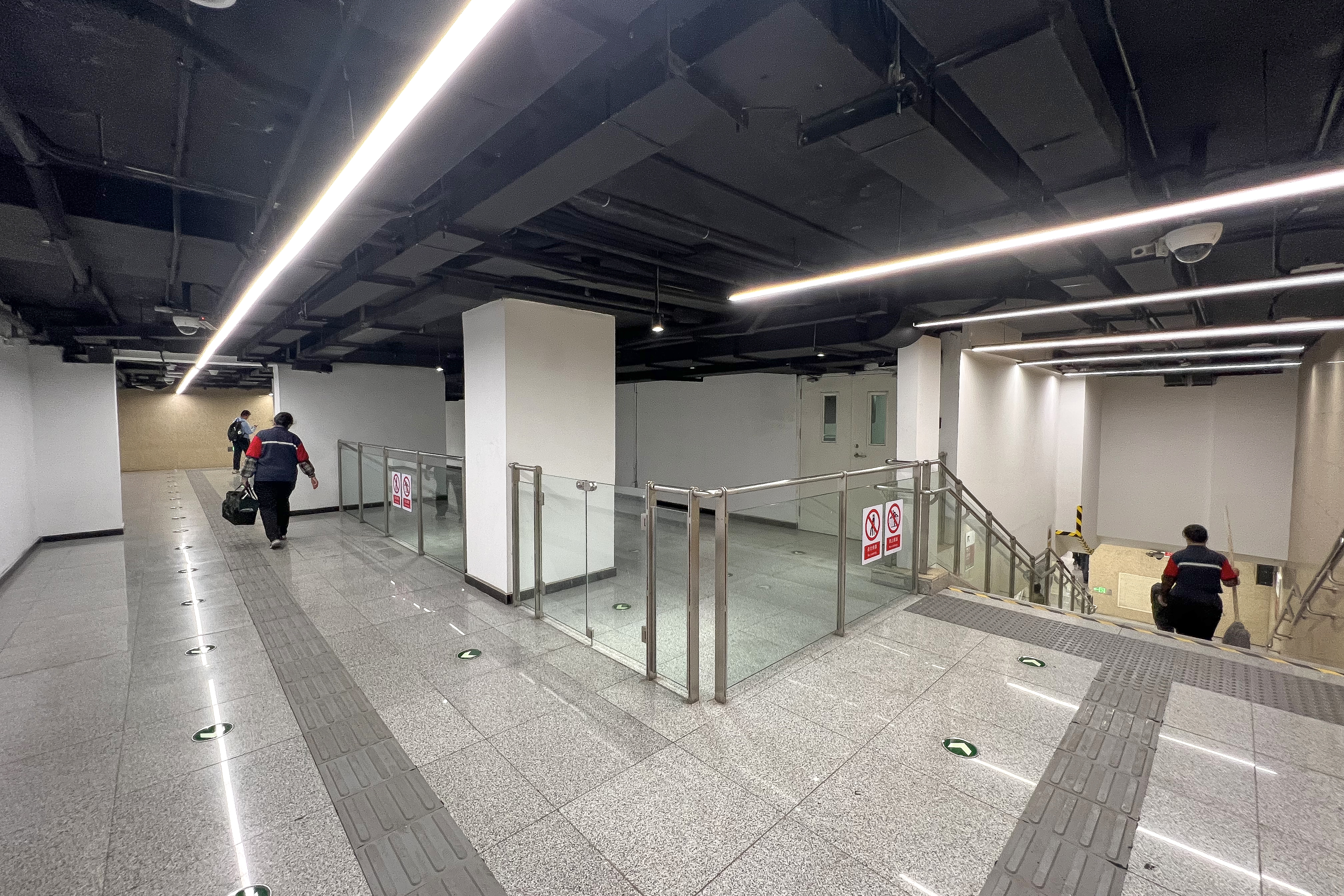
Post-renovated Mezzanine

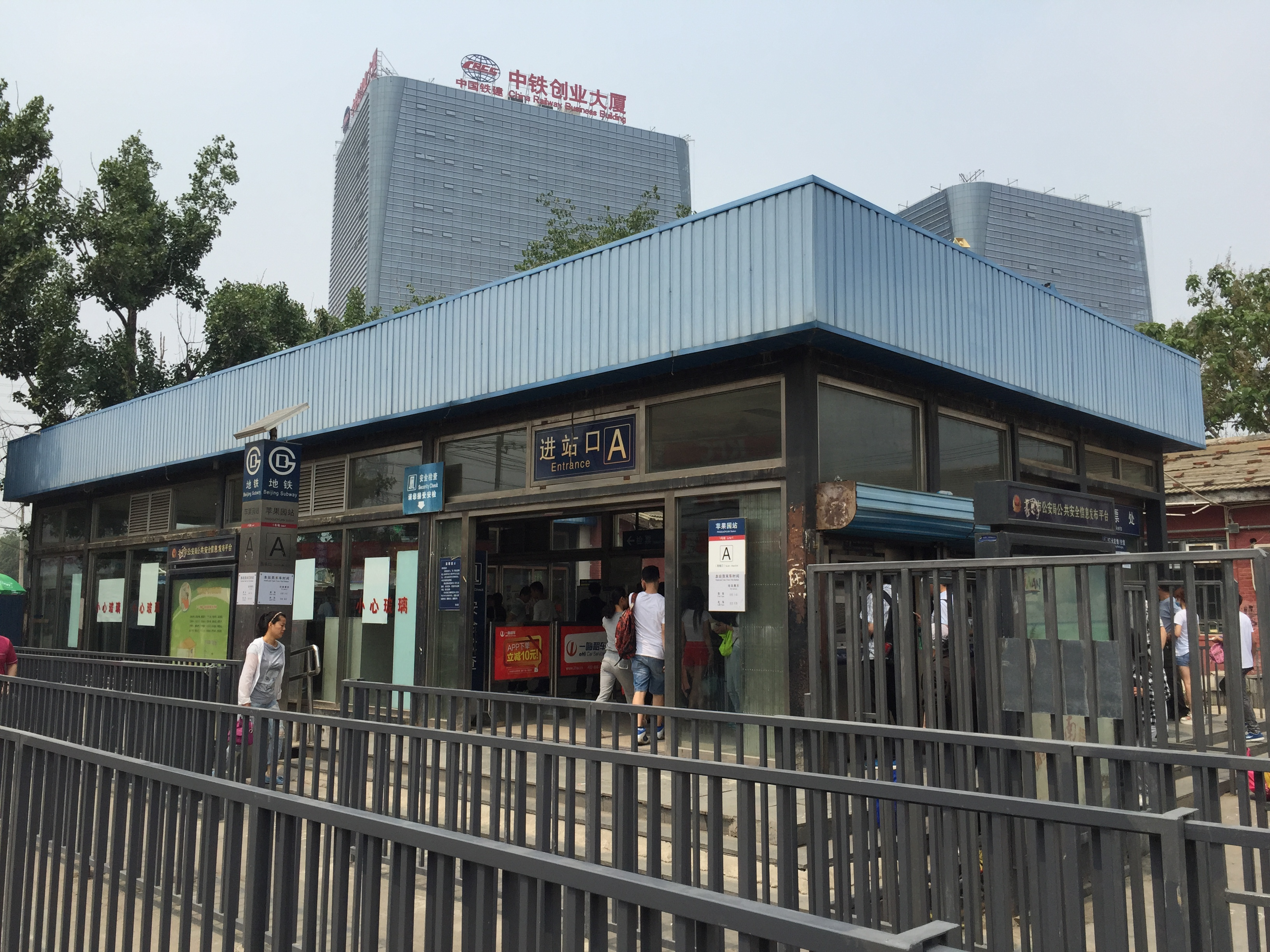
Original Street Level Station Hall

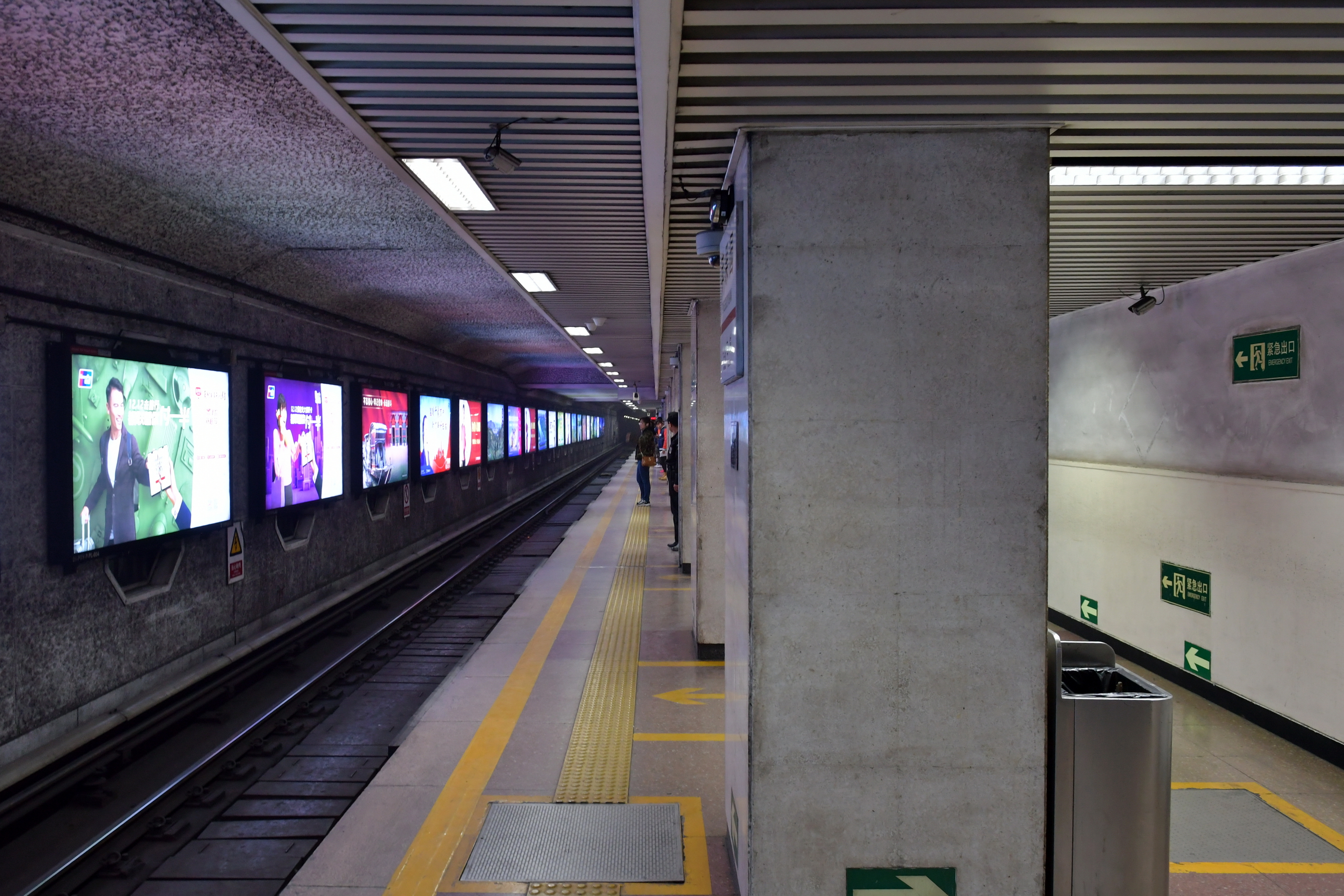
Pre-renovated platform middle

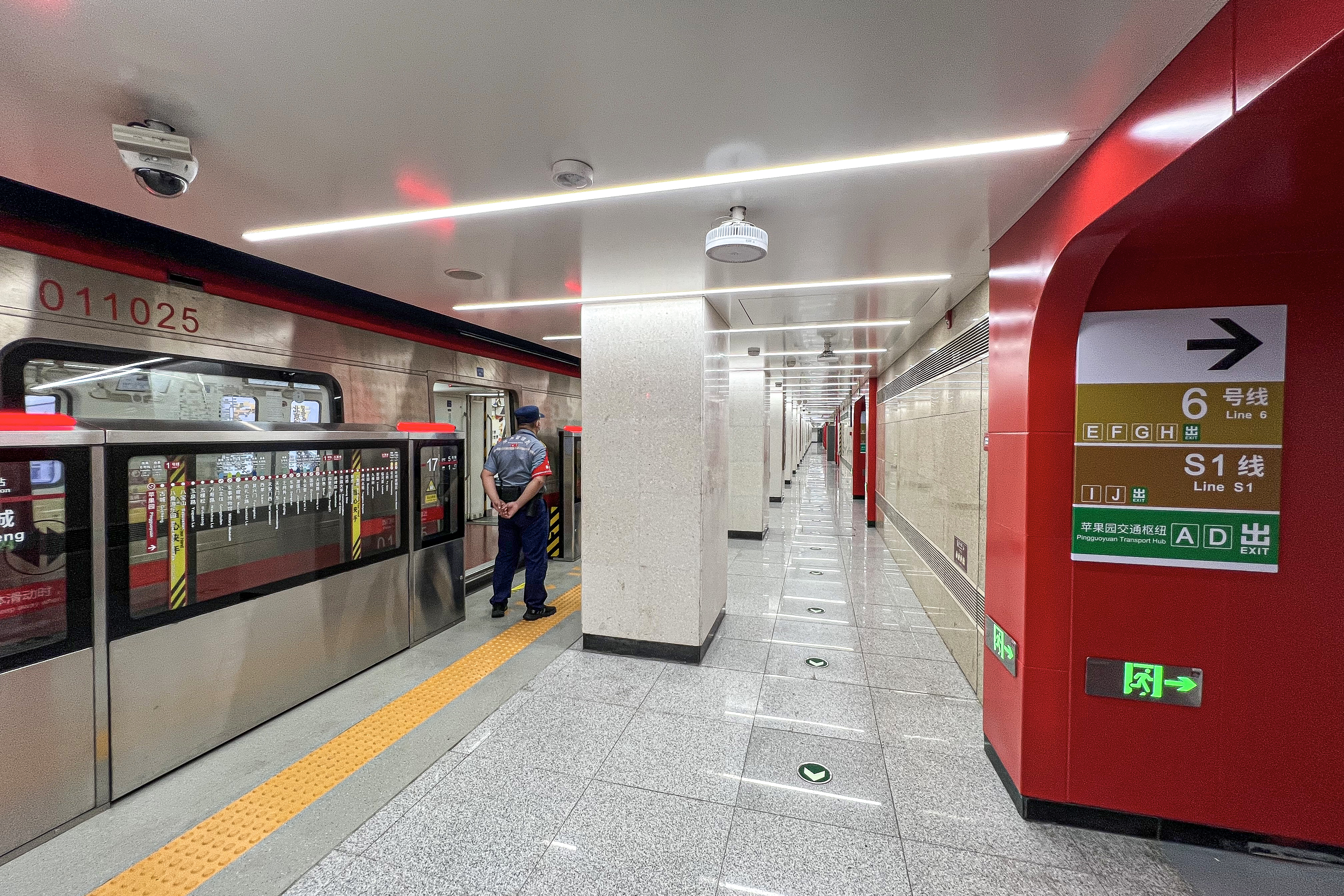
Post-renovated platform middle, with access to the newly-built concourse

=== Line 6 & Line S1 ===
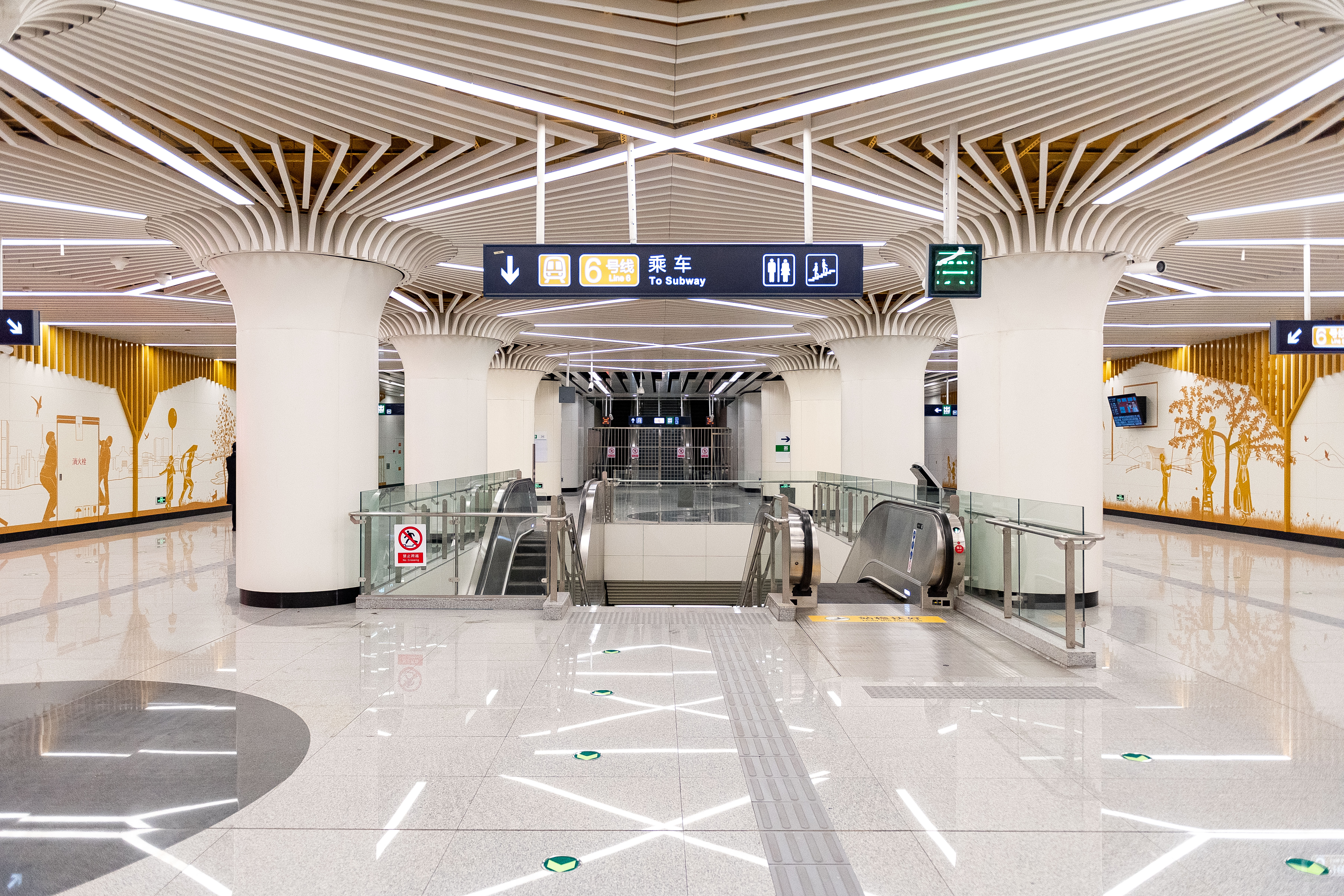
Line 6 concourse

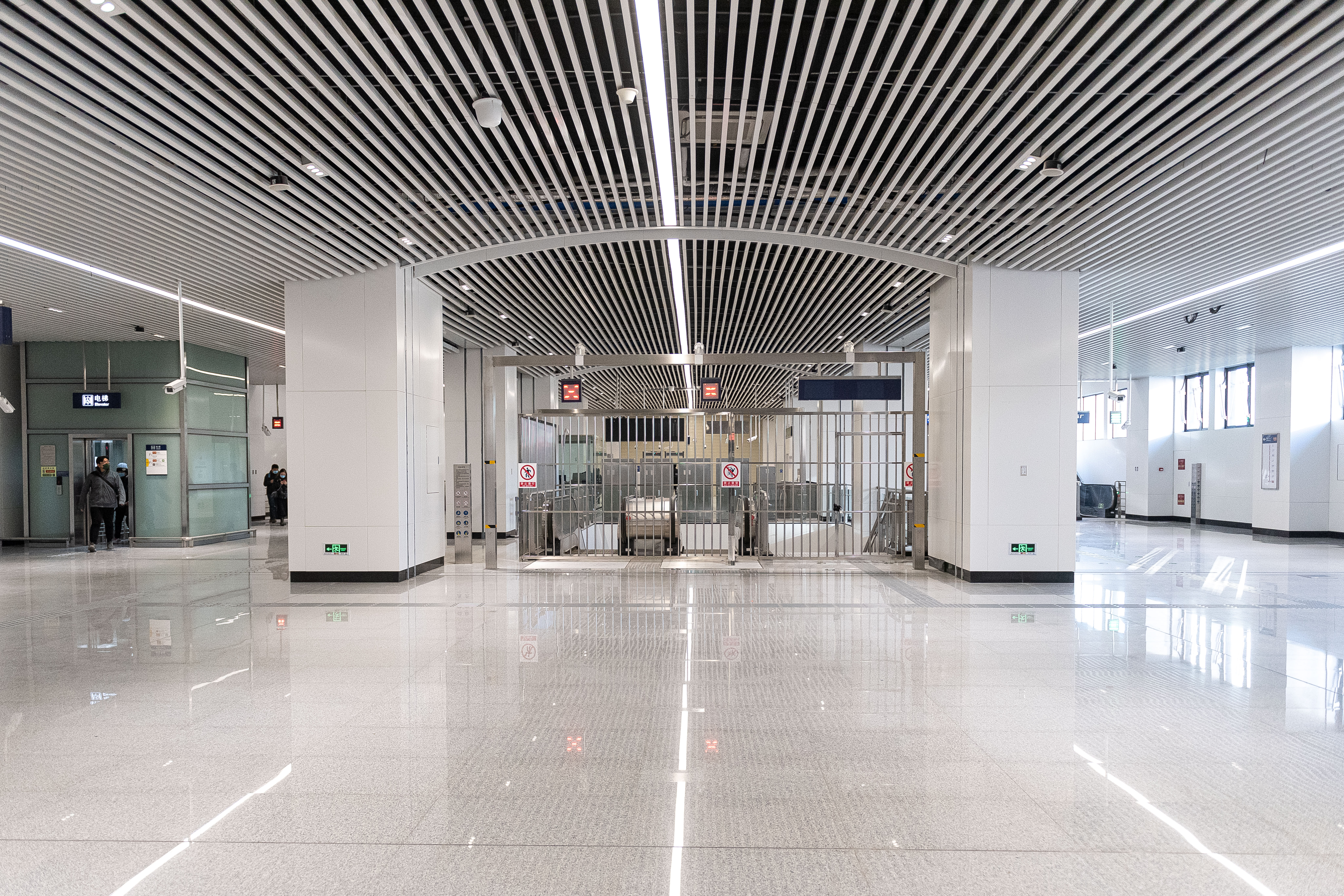
Line S1 concourse
