= Sujiatuo =

Sujiatuo Town 苏家坨镇
- Town
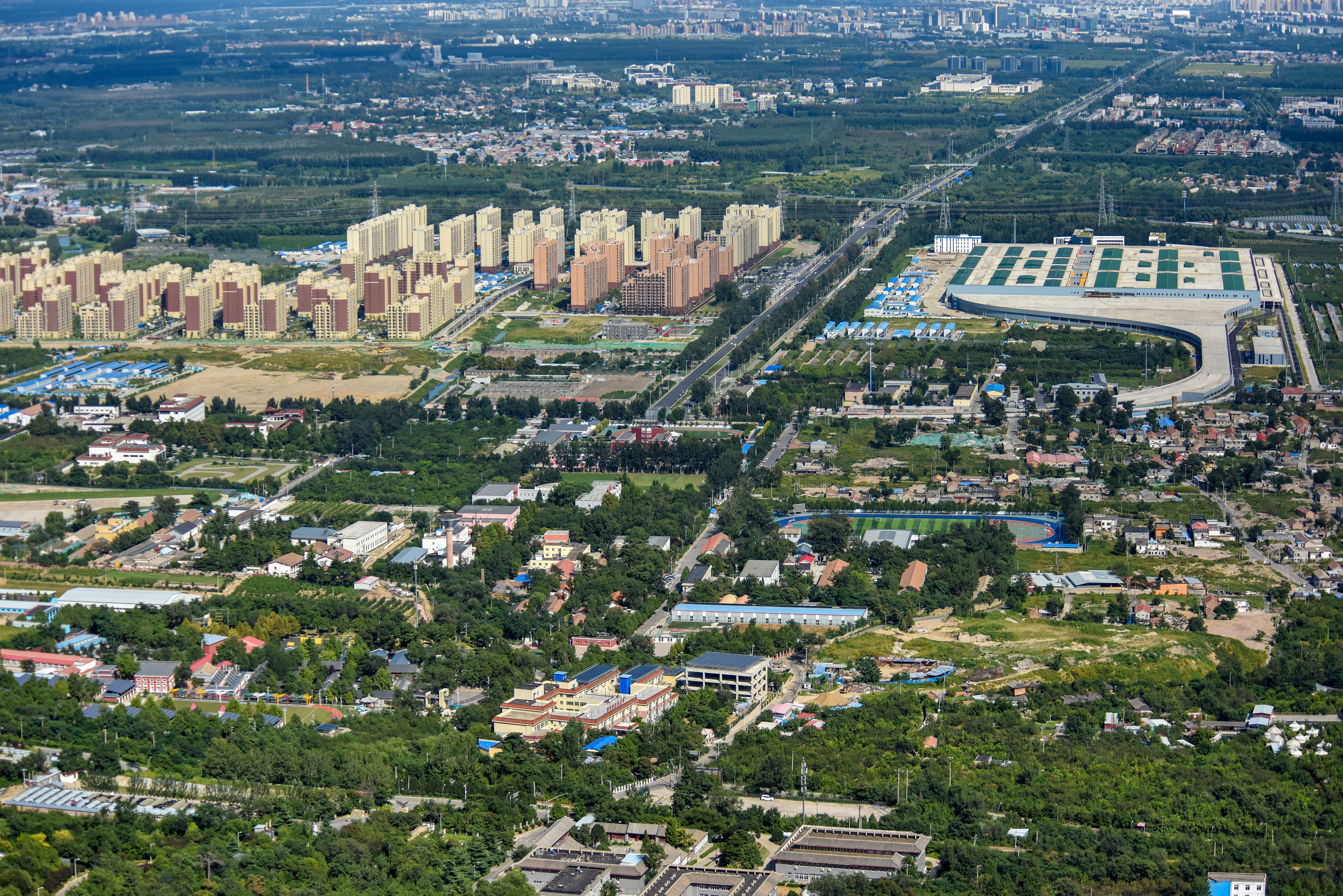
- Aerial view of Sujiatuo Town, 2017

- Location within Beijing Location within China
- Coordinates: 40°03′54″N 116°06′38″E
- Country: China
- Municipality: Beijing
- District: Haidian
- Village-level Divisions: 9 communities 10 villages 9 residential area

Area
  - Total: 84.57 km^{2} (32.65 sq mi)

Population (2020)
  - Total: 78,235
  - Density: 925.1/km^{2} (2,396/sq mi)
- Time zone: UTC+8 (China Standard)
- Postal code: 100194
- Area code: 010

Sujiatuo Town (Chinese: 苏家坨镇; pinyin: Sūjiātuó Zhèn) is a town on the northwestern corner of Haidian District, Beijing, China. It shares border with Yangfang Town to the north, Shangzhuang and Xibeiwang Town to the east, Wenquan and Juanzhuang Towns to the south, Miaofengshan and Liucun Towns to the west. It had a population of 78,235 in the year 2020.

During the Yuan dynasty this region was called Sujiakou Village, and the name was later changed to Sujiatuo (Chinese: 苏家坨; lit. 'Su Family's Mound') for a lump of soil on the north of the village.

== History ==
Timeline of Sujiatuo Area
Time	Status
Yuan dynasty	Part of Changping County
Ming and Qing dynasties	Part of Changping Department
1949	Part of the 6th District of Wanping County Hebei
1953	Established as Sujiatuo Township
1955	Incorporated Liulin and Changle Townships
1961	Formed Sujiatuo People's Commune
1983	Reinstalled as Sujiatuo Township
2003	Sujiatuo merged with Bei'anhe and Niegezhuang to form Sujiatuo Town
2011	Became an area while retaining the status of a town

== Administrative Divisions ==
Sujiatuo Town was subdivided into 28 sections in 2021, including 9 communities, 10 villages and 9 residential areas for stock economic cooperatives:

Administrative division code	Subdivision names	Name transliteration	Type
110108029001	北分瑞利	Beifen Ruili	Community
110108029002	北安河	Bei'anhe	Community
110108029003	聂各庄	Niegezhuang	Community
110108029004	稻香湖	Daoxianghu	Community
110108029005	前沙涧	Qianshajian	Community
110108029006	同泽园东里	Tongzeyuan Dongli	Community
110108029007	同泽园西里	Tongzeyuan Xili	Community
110108029008	安河家园东区	Anhe Jiayuan Dongqu	Community
110108029009	安河家园西区	Anhe Jiayuan Xiqu	Community
110108029203	苏三四	Susansi	Village
110108029204	西小营	Xixiaoying	Village
110108029206	柳林	Liulin	Village
110108029208	后沙涧	Shoushajian	Village
110108029213	草厂	Caochang	Village
110108029214	西埠头	Xibutou	Village
110108029215	七王坟	Qiwangfen	Village
110108029216	梁家园	Liangjiayuan	Village
110108029217	台头	Taitou	Village
110108029218	聂各庄	Niegezhuang	Village
110108029500	三星庄村	Sanxingzhuangcun	Residential Area
110108029501	苏一二村	Suyi'ercun	Residential Area
110108029502	北庄子村	Beizhuangzicun	Residential Area
110108029503	前沙涧村	Qianshajiancun	Residential Area
110108029504	南安河村	Nananhecun	Residential Area
110108029505	徐各庄村	Xugezhuangcun	Residential Area
110108029506	周家巷村	Zhoujiaxiangcun	Residential Area
110108029507	北安河村	Bei'anhecun	Residential Area
110108029508	车耳营村	Che'eryingcun	Residential Area

== Landmark ==
- Dajue Temple

== See also ==
- List of township-level divisions of Beijing
