= Yanyuan Subdistrict =

Yanyuan Subdistrict 燕园街道
- Subdistrict
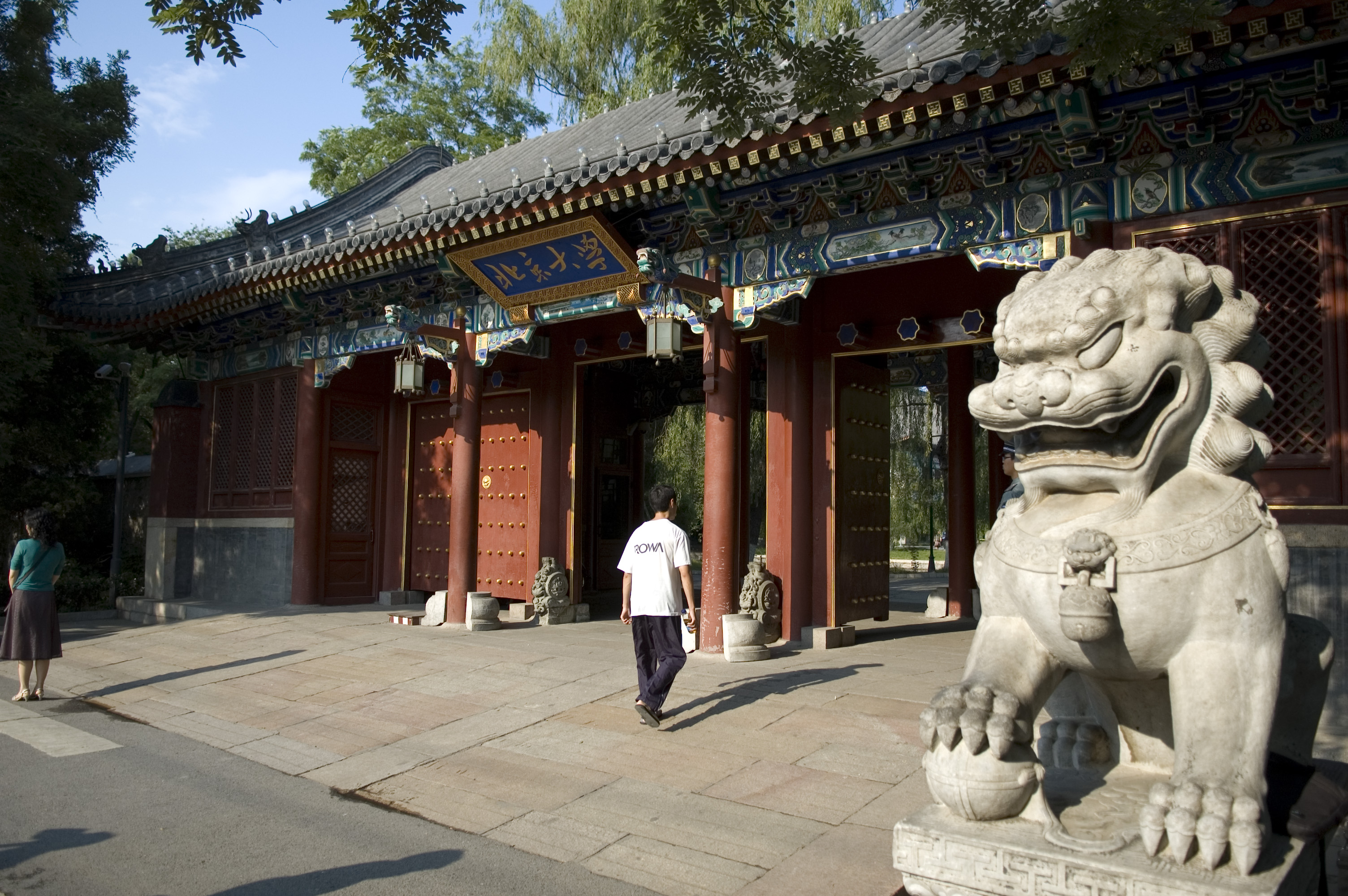
- Peking University within the subdistrict, 2008

- Location within Beijing Location within China
- Coordinates: 39°59′36″N 116°17′47″E
- Country: China
- Municipality: Beijing
- District: Haidian
- Village-level Divisions: 7 communities

Area
  - Total: 2.1 km^{2} (0.81 sq mi)
- Elevation: 54 m (177 ft)

Population (2020)
  - Total: 29,779
  - Density: 14,000/km^{2} (37,000/sq mi)
- Time zone: UTC+8 (China Standard)
- Postal code: 100871
- Area code: 010

Yanyuan Subdistrict (simplified Chinese: 燕园街道; traditional Chinese: 燕園街道; pinyin: Yànyuán Jiēdào) is a subdistrict of Haidian District, Beijing, It borders Qinghuayuan Subdistrict to its northeast, Zhongguancun Subdistrict to its southeast, Wanliu Area and Haidian Subdistrict to its south, and Qinglongqiao Subdistrict to its northwest. In 2020, it had a total population of 29,779.

The subdistrict was established in 1981. It derived its name from its location near the campus of Peking University, formerly known as Yanjing (Yenching) University. Currently it is co-administered by the Government of Haidian District and Peking University.

== Administrative Divisions ==
Yanyuan Subdistrict was made up of 7 residential communities. They are listed in the table below:

Administrative division code	Subdivision names	Name transliteration
110108015001	承泽园	Chengzeyuan
110108015002	畅春园	Changchunyuan
110108015003	蔚秀园	Weixiuyuan
110108015004	校内	Xiaonei
110108015005	中关园	Zhongguanyuan
110108015006	燕东园	Yandongyuan
110108015007	燕北园	Yanbeiyuan

== See also ==
- List of township-level divisions of Beijing
