= Pinggu Town =

Area and town in Beijing, China

Pinggu Town 平谷镇
- Town
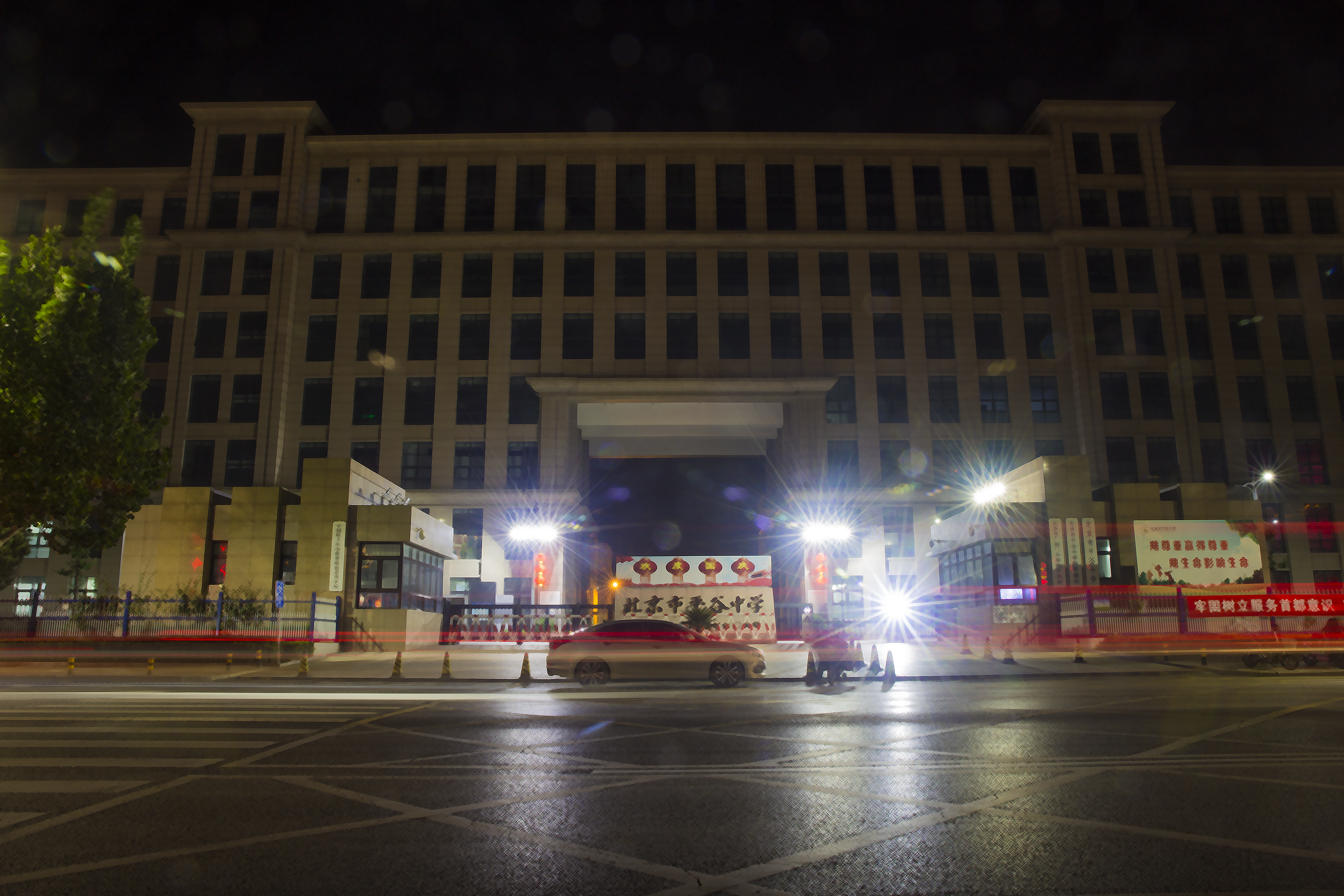
- Beijing Pinggu Middle School at night, 2018

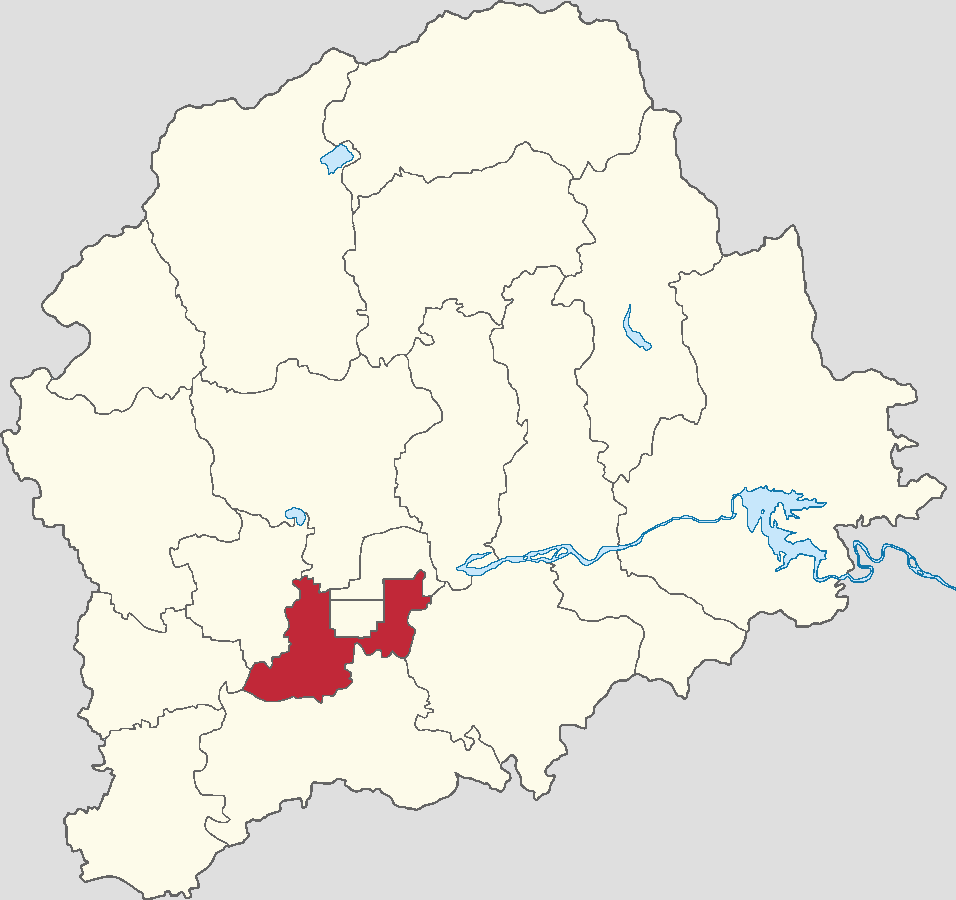
- Location of Pinggu Town in Pinggu District

- Location within Beijing Location within China
- Coordinates: 40°08′18″N 117°05′38″E
- Country: China
- Municipality: Beijing
- District: Pinggu
- Village-level Divisions: 8 communities 13 villages

Area
  - Total: 19.05 km^{2} (7.36 sq mi)
- Elevation: 30 m (98 ft)

Population (2020)
  - Total: 62,694
  - Density: 3,291/km^{2} (8,524/sq mi)
- Time zone: UTC+8 (China Standard)
- Postal code: 101205
- Area code: 010

Pinggu Town (Chinese: 平谷镇; pinyin: Pínggǔ Zhèn) is a town in Pinggu District, Beijing, China. It borders Wangxinzhuang Town and Xinggu Subdistrict to the north, Xiagezhuang Town to the east, Donggaocun Town to the south, Machangying and Daxingzhuang Towns to the west, and surrounds Binhe Subdistrict on three sides. According to the 2020 census, its population was 62,694.

It was named Pinggu Town (Chinese: 平谷镇; pinyin: Pínggǔ Zhèn) because of its location in a plain surrounded by mountains on the north, east and south. When it became an area in 2002, the name Yuyang Area (Chinese: 渔阳地区; pinyin: Yúyáng Dìqū) was given, in order to distinguish it from the larger Pinggu District. As of 2025, official sources solely use the term Pinggu Town.

== History ==
Timeline of Pinggu Town's History
Year	Status	Within
1953 - 1958	Chengguan Town	Pinggu County, Hebei
1958 - 1984	Chengguan People's Commune	Pinggu County, Beijing
1984 - 1990	Chengguan Township	Pinggu County, Beijing
1990 - 2002	Pinggu Town	Pinggu County, Beijing
2002–present	Yuyang Area (Pinggu Town)	Pinggu District, Beijing

== Administrative divisions ==
By the end of 2021, Pinggu Town consisted of 21 subdivisions, in which 8 were communities and 13 were villages. They are named in the following list:

Subdivision names	Name transliterations	Type
海关西园	Haiguan Xiyuan	Community
胜利	Shengli	Community
太和园	Taiheyuan	Community
建兰	Jianlan	Community
迎宾花园	Yingbin Huayuan	Community
岳泰嘉园	Yuetai Jiayuan	Community
仁和	Renhe	Community
洳河	Ruhe	Community
西寺渠	Xi Siqu	Village
东寺渠	Dong Siqu	Village
园田队	Yuantiandui	Village
胜利街	Shenglijie	Village
平安街	Ping'anjie	Village
和平街	Hepingjie	Village
太平街	Taipingjie	Village
岳各庄	Yuegezhuang	Village
赵各庄	Zhaogezhuang	Village
北台头	Beitaitou	Village
西鹿角	Xi Lujiao	Village
下纸寨	Xiazhizhai	Village
东鹿角	Dong Lujiao	Village

== See also ==
- List of township-level divisions of Beijing
