= Yan Yuan =

Yan Yuan (Wade-Giles: Yen Yüan) may refer to:

- Yan Hui (disciple of Confucius), also known as Yan Yuan
- Yan Yuan (Qing dynasty), Confucian scholar
- Yanyuan County, Sichuan
- Yanyuan Subdistrict (燕园庄街道), Haidian District, Beijing
