= Dongsheng, Beijing =

Dongsheng Town 东升镇
- Town
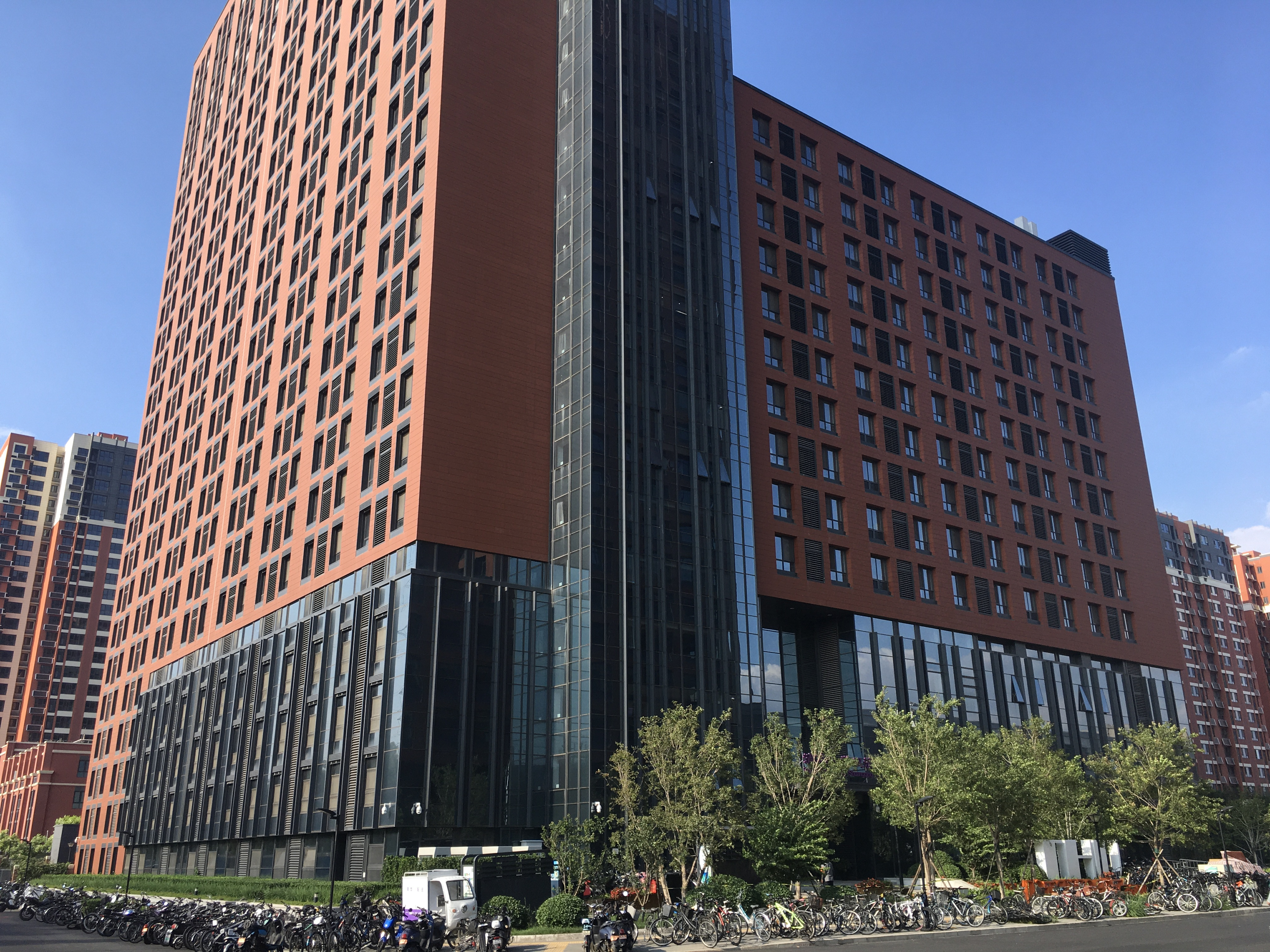
- Shuangqing Apartment of Tsinghua University within the town, 2021

- Location within Beijing Location within China
- Coordinates: 39°59′34″N 116°19′42″E
- Country: China
- Municipality: Beijing
- District: Haidian
- Village-level Divisions: 9 communities 2 villages 1 residential area

Area
  - Total: 8.13 km^{2} (3.14 sq mi)

Population (2020)
  - Total: 58,151
  - Density: 7,150/km^{2} (18,500/sq mi)
- Time zone: UTC+8 (China Standard)
- Postal code: 100083
- Area code: 010

Dongsheng Town (Chinese: 东升镇; pinyin: Dōngshēng Zhèn) is a town on the eastern side of Haidian District, Beijing, China. Its population was 58,151 as of 2020. The name Dongsheng literally translates to "rising from the east“.

== History ==
Timeline of Dongsheng Area
Year	Status
1949	Part of the 16th District
1950	Part of the 13th District
1958	Beitaipingzhuang Subdistrict, Dazhongsi and Wudaokou Townships Merged to form Dongsheng People's Commune
1984	Changed from commune to a township
2001	Gained the status of an area while still remaining as a township
2011	Changed to a town

== Administrative Divisions ==
In 2021, Dongsheng Area was composed of 12 subdivisions, including 9 communities, 2 villages and 1 residential area:

Administrative division code	Subdivision names	Name transliteration	Type
110108024001	八家	Bajia	Community
110108024002	前屯	Qiantun	Community
110108024003	马坊	Mafang	Community
110108024004	奥北	Aobei	Community
110108024005	文龙	Wenlong	Community
110108024006	龙岗	Longgang	Community
110108024007	观林园	Guanlinyuan	Community
110108024008	龙樾	Longyue	Community
110108024009	文晟	Wensheng	Community
110108024206	马坊	Mafang	Village
110108024209	清河	Qinghe	Village
110108024500	小营股份经济合作社	Xiaoying Gufen Jingji Hezuoshe	Residential Area

== See also ==
- List of township-level divisions of Beijing
