= List of township-level divisions of Beijing =

Location of Beijing Municipality in China

This is a list of township-level divisions of the municipality of Beijing, People's Republic of China (PRC). After province, prefecture, and county-level divisions, township-level divisions constitute the formal fourth-level administrative divisions of the PRC. However, as Beijing is a province-level municipality, the prefecture-level divisions are absent and so county-level divisions are at the second level, and township-level divisions are at the third level of administration. There are a total of 343 such divisions in Beijing, divided into 165 subdistricts, 143 towns, 30 townships, and 5 ethnic townships. This list is organised by the county-level divisions of the municipality.

== Changping District ==
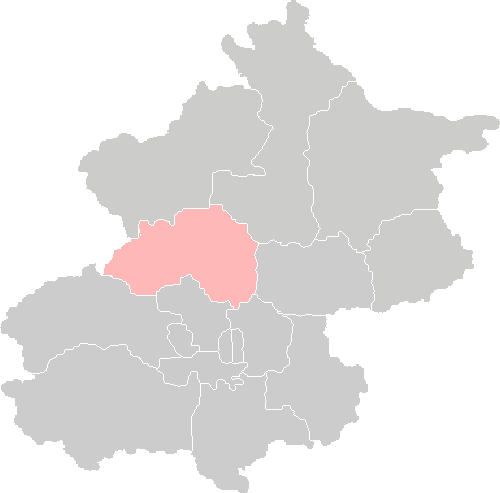
Location of Changping District in the municipality

Subdistricts

- Chengbei Subdistrict (城北街道), Chengnan Subdistrict (城南街道), Huilongguan Subdistrict (回龙观街道), Longzeyuan Subdistrict (龙泽园街道), Shigezhuang Subdistrict (史各庄街道), Tiantongyuanbei Subdistrict (天通苑北街道), Tiantongyuannan Subdistrict (天通苑南街道), Huoying Subdistrict (霍营街道)

Towns

- Yangfang (阳坊镇), Xiaotangshan (小汤山镇), Nanshao (南邵镇), Cuicun (崔村镇), Baishan (百善镇), Beiqijia (北七家镇), Xingshou (兴寿镇), Liucun (流村镇), Shisanling (十三陵镇), Yanshou (延寿镇), Nankou (南口镇), Machikou (马池口镇), Shahe (沙河镇), Dongxiaokou (东小口镇)

== Chaoyang District ==
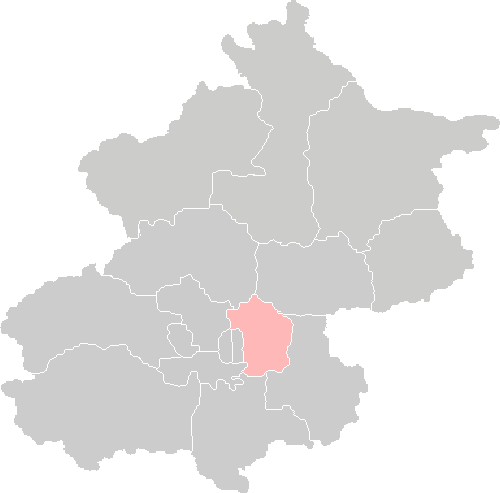
Location of Chaoyang District in the municipality

Subdistricts

- Jianwai Subdistrict (建外街道), Chaowai Subdistrict (朝外街道), Hujialou Subdistrict (呼家楼街道), Sanlitun Subdistrict (三里屯街道), Zuojiazhuang Subdistrict (左家庄街道), Xiangheyuan Subdistrict (香河园街道), Hepingjie Subdistrict (和平街街道), Anzhen Subdistrict (安贞街道), Yayuncun Subdistrict (亚运村街道), Xiaoguan Subdistrict (小关街道), Jiuxianqiao Subdistrict (酒仙桥街道), Maizidian Subdistrict (麦子店街道), Tuanjiehu Subdistrict (团结湖街道), Liulitun Subdistrict (六里屯街道), Balizhuang Subdistrict (八里庄街道), Shuangjing Subdistrict (双井街道), Jinsong Subdistrict (劲松街道), Panjiayuan Subdistrict (潘家园街道), Fatou Subdistrict (垡头街道), Datun Subdistrict (大屯街道), Wangjing Subdistrict (望京街道), Aoyuncun Subdistrict (奥运村街道), Capital Airport Subdistrict (首都机场街道), Donghu Subdistrict (东湖街道)

Townships

- Nanmofang (南磨房乡), Gaobeidian (高碑店乡), Jiangtai (将台乡), Taiyanggong (太阳宫乡), Xiaohongmen (小红门乡), Shibalidian (十八里店乡), Pingfang (平房乡), Dongfeng (东风乡), Laiguangying (来广营乡), Sanjianfang (三间房乡), Guanzhuang (管庄乡), Jinzhan (金盏乡), Sunhe (孙河乡), Cuigezhuang (崔各庄乡), Dongba (东坝乡), Heizhuanghu (黑庄户乡), Dougezhuang (豆各庄乡), Wangsiying (王四营乡)

Ethnic Townships

- Changying Hui Ethnic Township (常营回族乡)

== Daxing District ==
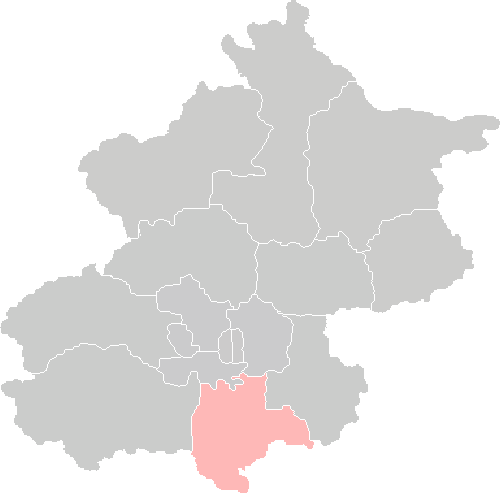
Location of Daxing District in the municipality

Subdistricts

- Xingfeng Subdistrict (兴丰街道), Linxiaolu Subdistrict (林校路街道), Qingyuan Subdistrict (清源街道), Guanyinsi Subdistrict (观音寺街道), Tiangongyuan Subdistrict (天宫院街道), Gaomidian Subdistrict (高米店街道), Ronghua Subdistrict (荣华街道), Boxing Subdistrict (博兴街道)

Towns

- Yizhuang (亦庄镇), Huangcun (黄村镇), Jiugong (旧宫镇), Xihongmen (西红门镇), Yinghai (瀛海镇), Qingyundian (青云店镇), Caiyu (采育镇), Anding (安定镇), Lixian (礼贤镇), Yufa (榆垡镇), Panggezhuang (庞各庄镇), Beizangcun (北臧村镇), Weishanzhuang (魏善庄镇), Zhangziying (长子营镇)

== Dongcheng District ==
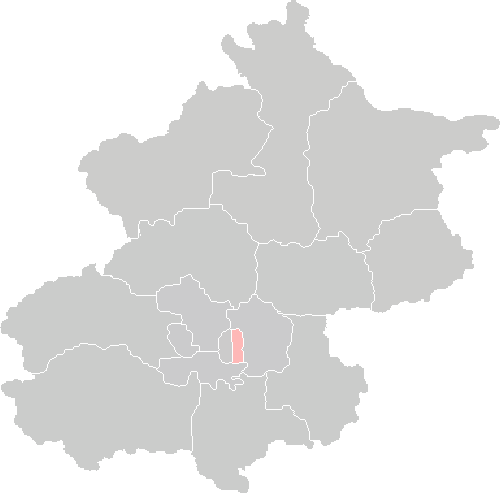
Location of Dongcheng District in the municipality

Subdistricts

- Jingshan Subdistrict (景山街道), Donghuamen Subdistrict (东华门街道), Jiaodaokou Subdistrict (交道口街道), Andingmen Subdistrict (安定门街道), Beixinqiao Subdistrict (北新桥街道), Dongsi Subdistrict (东四街道), Chaoyangmen Subdistrict (朝阳门街道), Jianguomen Subdistrict (建国门街道), Dongzhimen Subdistrict (东直门街道), Hepingli Subdistrict (和平里街道), Qianmen Subdistrict (前门街道), Chongwenmenwai Subdistrict (崇文门外街道), Donghuashi Subdistrict (东花市街道), Longtan Subdistrict (龙潭街道), Tiyuguanlu Subdistrict (体育馆路街道), Tiantan Subdistrict (天坛街道), Yongdingmenwai Subdistrict (永定门外街道)

== Fangshan District ==
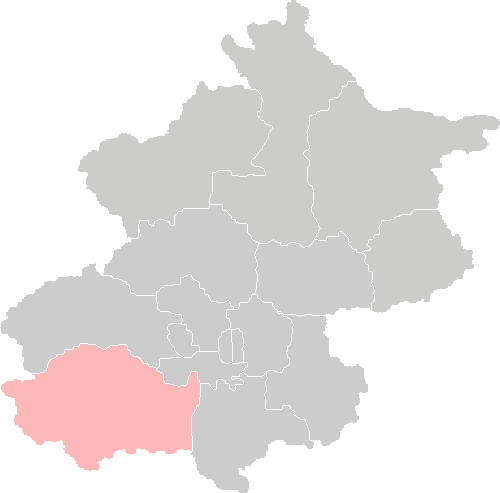
Location of Fangshan District in the municipality

Subdistricts

- Gongchen Subdistrict (拱辰街道), Chengguan Subdistrict (城关街道), Xinzhen Subdistrict (新镇街道), Xiangyang Subdistrict (向阳街道), Dongfeng Subdistrict (东风街道), Yingfeng Subdistrict (迎风街道), Xingcheng Subdistrict (星城街道), Xilu Subdistrict (西潞街道)

Towns

- Liangxiang (良乡镇), Zhoukoudian (周口店镇), Liulihe (琉璃河镇), Yancun (阎村镇), Doudian (窦店镇), Shilou (石楼镇), Changyang (长阳镇), Hebei (河北镇), Changgou (长沟镇), Dashiwo (大石窝镇), Zhangfang (张坊镇), Shidu (十渡镇), Qinglonghu (青龙湖镇), Hancunhe (韩村河镇)

Townships

- Xiayunling (霞云岭乡), Nanjiao (南窖乡), Fozizhuang (佛子庄乡), Da'anshan (大安山乡), Shijiaying (史家营乡), Puwa (蒲洼乡)

== Fengtai District ==
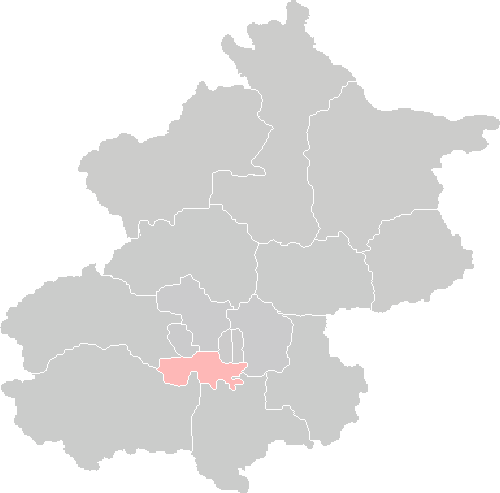
Location of Fengtai District in the municipality

Subdistricts

- Fengtai Subdistrict (丰台街道), You'anmen Subdistrict (右安门街道), Taipingqiao Subdistrict (太平桥街道), Xiluoyuan Subdistrict (西罗园街道), Dahongmen Subdistrict (大红门街道), Nanyuan Subdistrict (南苑街道), Donggaodi Subdistrict (东高地街道), Dongtiejiangying Subdistrict (东铁匠营街道), Lugouqiao Subdistrict (卢沟桥街道), Xincun Subdistrict (新村街道), Changxindian Subdistrict (长辛店街道), Yungang Subdistrict (云岗街道), Majiapu Subdistrict (马家堡街道), Heyi Subdistrict (和义街道), Fangzhuang Subdistrict (方庄街道), Liuliqiao Subdistrict (六里桥街道), Wanping Subdistrict (宛平城街道), Chengshousi Subdistrict (成寿寺街道), Shiliuzhuang Subdistrict (石榴庄街道), Yuquanying Subdistrict (玉泉营街道), Kandan Subdistrict (看丹街道), Wulidian Subdistrict (五里店街道), Qingta Subdistrict (青塔街道), Huaxiang Subdistrict (花乡街道)

Towns

- Beigong (北宫镇), Wangzuo (王佐镇)

== Haidian District ==
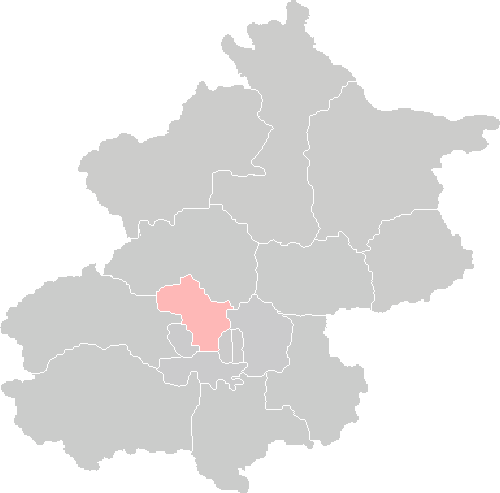
Location of Haidian District in the municipality

Subdistricts

- Wanshoulu Subdistrict (万寿路街道), Yongdinglu Subdistrict (永定路街道), Yangfangdian Subdistrict (羊坊店街道), Ganjiakou Subdistrict (甘家口街道), Balizhuang Subdistrict (八里庄街道), Zizhuyuan Subdistrict (紫竹院街道), Beixiaguan Subdistrict (北下关街道), Beitaipingzhuang Subdistrict (北太平庄街道), Xueyuanlu Subdistrict (学院路街道), Zhongguancun Subdistrict (中关村街道), Haidian Subdistrict (海淀街道), Qinglongqiao Subdistrict (青龙桥街道), Qinghuayuan Subdistrict (清华园街道), Yanyuan Subdistrict (燕园街道), Xiangshan Subdistrict (香山街道), Qinghe Subdistrict (清河街道), Huayuanlu Subdistrict (花园路街道), Xisanqi Subdistrict (西三旗街道), Malianwa Subdistrict (马连洼街道), Tiancunlu Subdistrict (田村路街道), Shangdi Subdistrict (上地街道), Shuguang Subdistrict (曙光街道)

Towns

- Wanliu (海淀镇), Dongsheng (东升镇), Wenquan ( 温泉镇), Sijiqing (四季青镇), Xibeiwang (西北旺镇), Sujiatuo (苏家坨镇), Shangzhuang (上庄镇)

== Huairou District ==
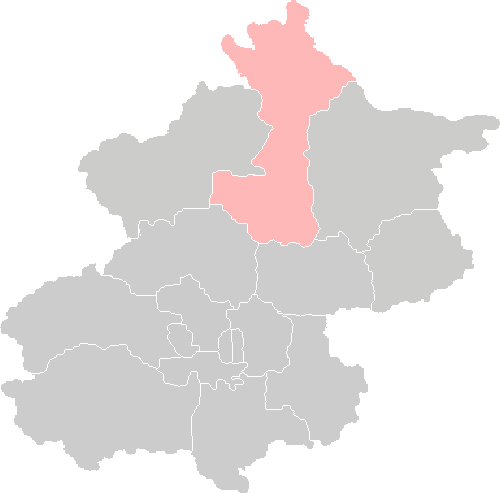
Location of Huairou District in the municipality

Subdistricts

- Longshan Subdistrict (龙山街道), Quanhe Subdistrict (泉河街道)

Towns

- Huairou (怀柔镇), Yanqi (雁栖镇), Miaocheng (庙城镇), Beifang (北房镇), Yangsong (杨宋镇), Qiaozi (桥梓镇), Huaibei (怀北镇), Tanghekou (汤河口镇), Bohai (渤海镇), Jiuduhe (九渡河镇), Liulimiao (琉璃庙镇), Baoshan (宝山镇)

Ethnic Townships

- Changxiaoying Manchu Ethnic Township (长哨营满族乡), Labagoumen Manchu Ethnic Township (喇叭沟门满族乡)

== Mentougou District ==
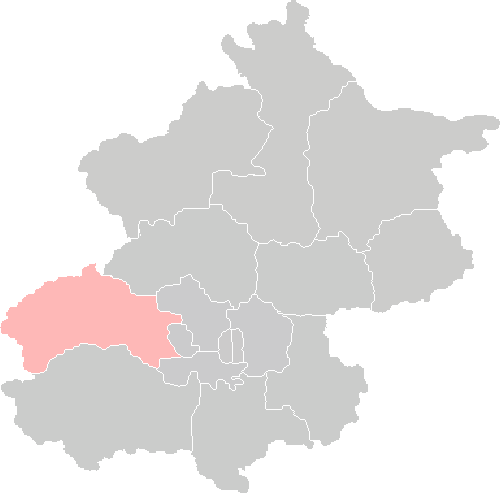
Location of Mentougou District in the municipality

Subdistricts

- Dayu Subdistrict (大峪街道), Chengzi Subdistrict (城子街道), Dongxinfang Subdistrict (东辛房街道), Datai Subdistrict (大台街道)

Towns

- Wangping (王平镇),Tanzhesi (潭柘寺镇), Yongding (永定镇), Longquan (龙泉镇), Junzhuang (军庄镇), Yanchi (雁翅镇), Zhaitang (斋堂镇), Qingshui (清水镇), Miaofengshan (妙峰山镇)

== Pinggu District ==
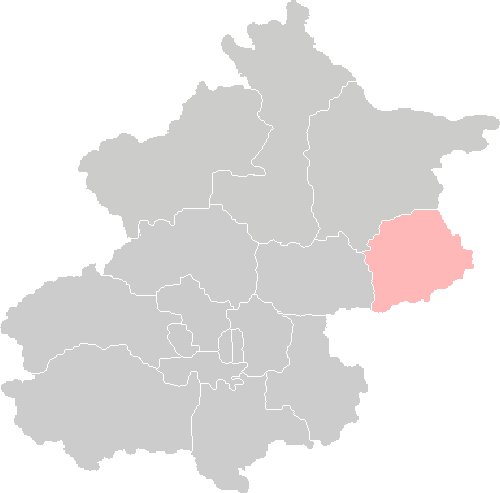
Location of Pinggu District in the municipality

Subdistricts

- Xinggu Subdistrict (兴谷街道), Binhe Subdistrict (滨河街道)

Towns

- Pinggu (平谷镇), Yukou (峪口镇), Mafang (马坊镇), Jinhaihu (金海湖镇), Donggaocun (东高村镇), Shandongzhuang (山东庄镇), Nandulehe (南独乐河镇), Dahuashan (大华山镇), Xiagezhuang (夏各庄镇), Machangying (马昌营镇), Wangxinzhuang (王辛庄镇), Daxingzhuang (大兴庄镇), Liujiadian (刘家店镇), Zhenluoying (镇罗营镇)

Townships

- Xiong'erzhai Township (熊儿寨乡), Huangsongyu Township (黄松峪乡)

== Shijingshan District ==
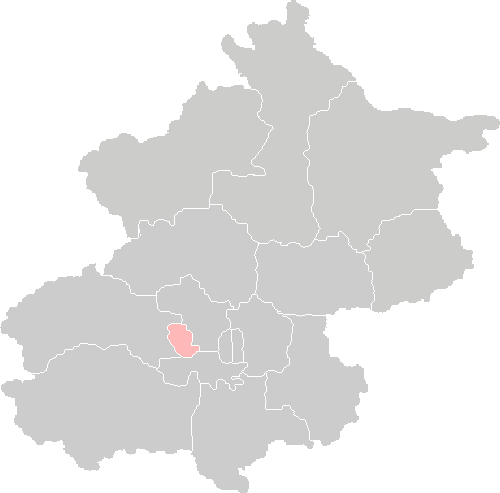
Location of Shijingshan District in the municipality

Subdistricts

- Babaoshan Subdistrict (八宝山街道), Laoshan Subdistrict (老山街道), Bajiao Subdistrict (八角街道), Gucheng Subdistrict (古城街道), Pingguoyuan Subdistrict (苹果园街道), Jindingjie Subdistrict (金顶街街道), Guangning Subdistrict (广宁街道), Wulituo Subdistrict (五里坨街道), Lugu Subdistrict (鲁谷街道)

== Shunyi District ==
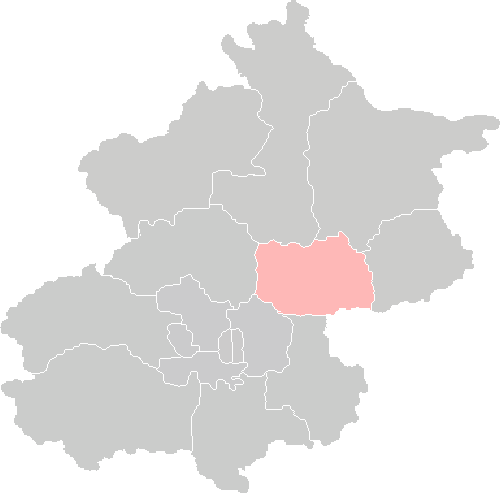
Location of Shunyi District in the municipality

Subdistricts

- Shengli Subdistrict (胜利街道), Guangming Subdistrict (光明街道), Shiyuan Subdistrict (石园街道), Shuangfeng Subdistrict (双丰街道), Wangquan Subdistrict (旺泉街道), Konggang Subdistrict (空港街道)

Towns

- Renhe (仁和镇), Houshayu (后沙峪镇), Tianzhu (天竺镇), Yangzhen (杨镇镇), Niulanshan (牛栏山镇), Nanfaxin (南法信镇), Mapo (马坡镇), Gaoliying (高丽镇), Liqiao (李桥镇), Lisui (李遂镇), Nancai (南彩镇), Beiwu (北务镇), Dasungezhuang (大孙各庄镇), Zhang (张镇), Longwantun (龙湾屯镇), Mulin (木林镇), Beixiaoying (北小营镇), Beishicao (北石槽镇), Zhaoquanying (赵全营镇)

== Tongzhou District ==
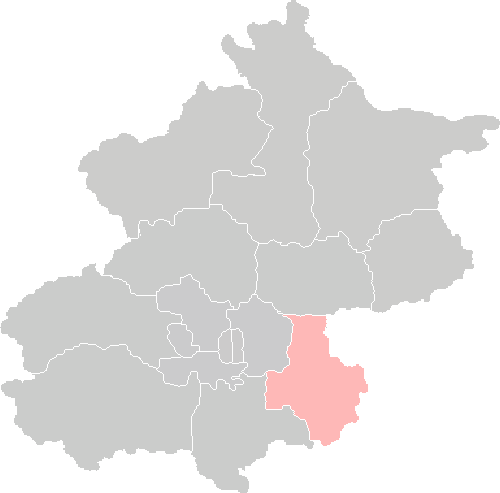
Location of Tongzhou District in the municipality

Subdistricts

- Beiyuan Subdistrict (北苑街道), Zhongcang Subdistrict (中仓街道), Xinhua Subdistrict (新华街道), Yuqiao Subdistrict (玉桥街道), Tongyun Subdistrict (通运街道), Luyuan Subdistrict (潞源街道), Wenjing Subdistrict (文景街道), Jiukeshu Subdistrict (九棵树街道), Linheli Subdistrict (临河里街道), Yangzhuang Subdistrict (杨庄街道), Luyi Subdistrict (潞邑街道)

Towns

- Yongshun (永顺镇), Liyuan (梨园镇), Songzhuang (宋庄镇), Zhangjiawan (张家湾镇), Huoxian (漷县镇), Majuqiao (马驹桥镇), Xiji (西集镇), Taihu (台湖镇), Yongledian (永乐店镇), Lucheng (潞城镇)

Ethnic Townships

- Yujiawu Hui Ethnic Township (于家务回族乡)

== Xicheng District ==
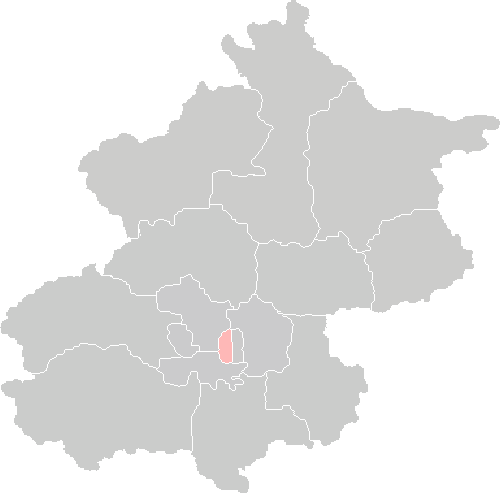
Location of Xicheng District in the municipality

Subdistricts

- Financial Street Subdistrict (金融街街道), Xichang'anjie Subdistrict (西长安街街道), Xinjiekou Subdistrict (新街口街道), Yuetan Subdistrict (月坛街道), Zhanlanlu Subdistrict (展览路街道), Desheng Subdistrict (德胜街道), Shichahai Subdistrict (什刹海街道), Dashilan Subdistrict (大栅栏街道), Tianqiao Subdistrict (天桥街道), Chunshu Subdistrict (椿树街道), Taoranting Subdistrict (陶然亭街道), Guang'anmennei Subdistrict (广安门内街道), Niujie Subdistrict (牛街街道), Baizhifang Subdistrict (白纸坊街道), Guang'anmenwai Subdistrict (广安门外街道)

== Miyun District ==
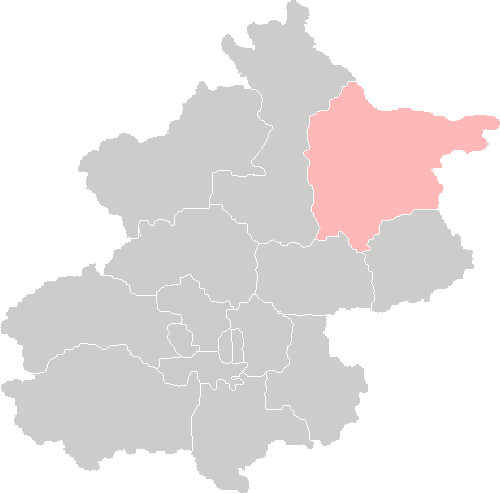
Location of Miyun District in the municipality

Subdistricts

- Gulou Subdistrict (鼓楼街道), Guoyuan Subdistrict (果园街道)

Towns

- Miyun (密云镇), Xiwengzhuang (溪翁庄镇), Xitiangezhuang (西田各庄镇), Shilipu (十里堡镇), Henanzhai (河南寨镇), Jugezhuang (巨各庄镇), Mujiayu (穆家峪镇), Taishitun (太师屯镇), Gaoling (高岭镇), Bulaotun (不老屯镇), Fengjiayu (冯家峪镇), Gubeikou (古北口镇), Dachengzi (大城子镇), Dongshaoqu (东邵渠镇), Beizhuang (北庄镇), Xinchengzi (新城子镇), Shicheng (石城镇)

Ethnic Townships

- Tanying Manchu and Mongol Ethnic Township (檀营满族蒙古族乡)

== Yanqing District ==
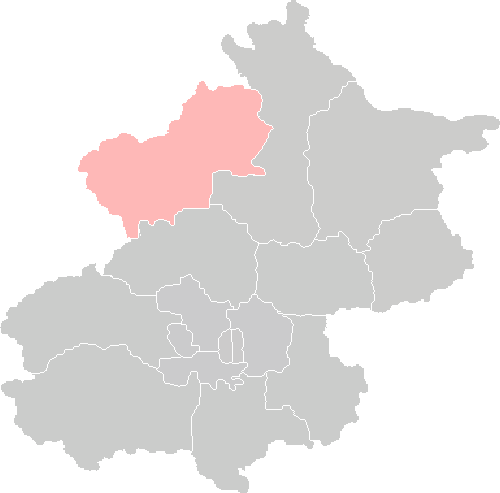
Location of Yanqing District in the municipality

Subdistricts

- Rulin Subdistrict (儒林街道), Baiquan Subdistrict (百泉街道), Xiangshuiyuan Subdistrict (香水园街道)

Towns

- Yanqing (延庆镇), Kangzhuang (康庄镇), Badaling (八达岭镇), Yongning (永宁镇), Jiuxian (旧县镇), Zhangshanying (张山营镇), Sihai (四海镇), Qianjiadian (千家店镇), Shenjiaying (沈家营镇), Dayushu (大榆树镇), Jingzhuang (井庄镇)

Townships

- Dazhuangke Township (大庄科乡), Liubinbu Township (刘斌堡乡), Xiangying Township (香营乡), Zhenzhuquan Township (珍珠泉乡)
