= Liubinbu =

Liubinbu Township 刘斌堡乡
- Township
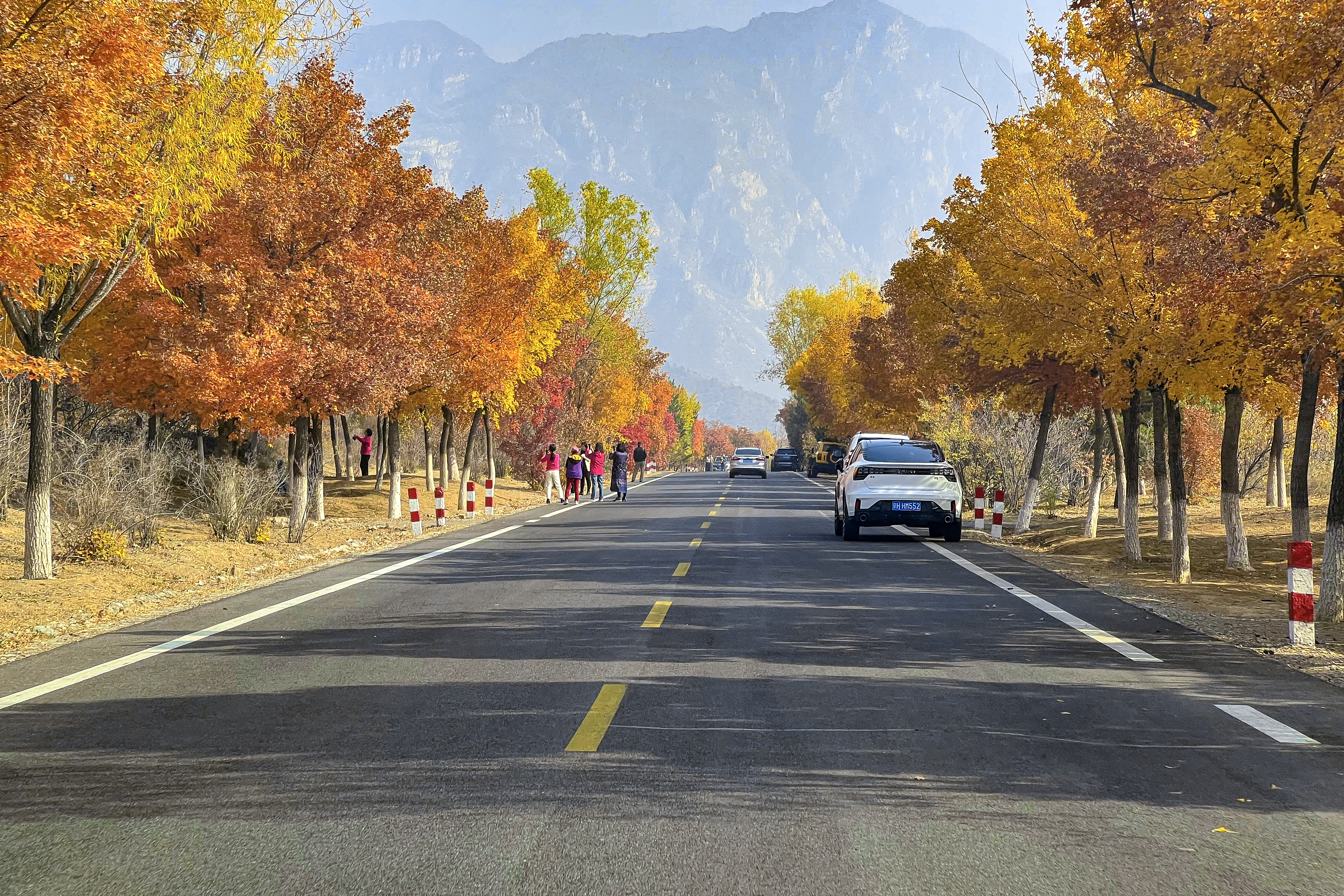
- Liubinbu section of Xianlong Highway, 2022

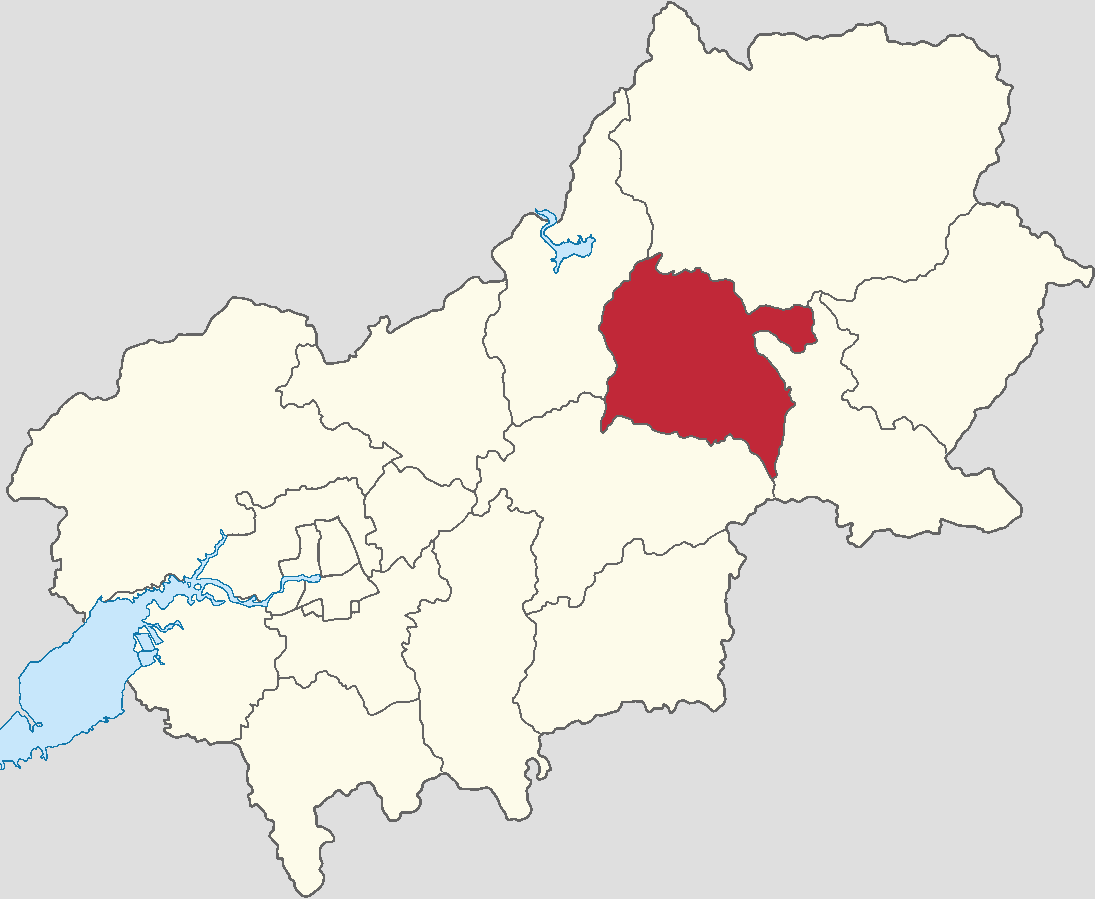
- Location within Yanqing District

- Location within Beijing Location within China
- Coordinates: 40°34′05″N 116°13′34″E
- Country: China
- Municipality: Beijing
- District: Yanqing
- Village-level Divisions: 1 community 16 villages

Area
  - Total: 119.5 km^{2} (46.1 sq mi)
- Elevation: 583 m (1,913 ft)

Population (2020)
  - Total: 4,497
  - Density: 37.63/km^{2} (97.47/sq mi)
- Time zone: UTC+8 (China Standard)
- Postal code: 102104
- Area code: 010

Liubinbu Township (simplified Chinese: 刘斌堡乡; traditional Chinese: 劉斌堡鄉; pinyin: Liúbīnbǔ Xiāng) is a township situated on the northeastern side of Yanqing District, Beijing, China. It shares border with Qianjiadian Town to its north, Sihai Town to its east, Yongning Town to its south, and Xiangying Township to its west. It had 4,497 people residing within its boundaries in 2020.

== Geography ==
Liubinbu Township sits inside of a basin within Yan Mountain Range. China National Highway 234 (formerly known as S323 Yanliu Road) goes through the town.

== History ==
Timetable of Liubinbu Township
| Year | Status | Belong to |
|---|---|---|
| 1946 - 1951 | 3rd District | Sihai County, Hebei |
| 1951 - 1952 | 8th District | Yanqing County, Chahar |
| 1952 - 1953 | 8th District | Yanqing County, Hebei |
| 1953 - 1956 | Yingpan Township Liubinbu Township Hongguosi Township | Yanqing County, Hebei |
| 1956 - 1957 | Liubinbu Township Hongguosi Township | Yanqing County, Hebei |
| 1957 - 1958 | Liubinbu Township | Yanqing County, Hebei |
| 1958 - 1967 | Liubinbu Production Team, under Yongning People's Commune | Yanqing County, Beijing |
| 1967 - 1973 | Daguantou People's Commune | Yanqing County, Beijing |
| 1973 - 1983 | Liubinbu People's Commune | Yanqing County, Beijing |
| 1983 - 2015 | Liubinbu Township | Yanqing County, Beijing |
| 2015–present | Liubinbu Township | Yanqing District, Beijing |

== Administrative divisions ==
So far in 2021, Liubinbu Township is divided into 17 subdivisions, of those 1 is a community and 16 are villages. They are, by order of their Administrative Division Codes:

| Subdivision names | Name transliterations | Type |
|---|---|---|
| 刘斌堡乡 | Liubinbuxiang | Community |
| 刘斌堡 | Liubinbu | Village |
| 大观头 | Daguantou | Village |
| 周四沟 | Zhousigou | Village |
| 红果寺 | Hongguosi | Village |
| 上虎叫 | Shang Hujiao | Village |
| 下虎叫 | Xia Hujiao | Village |
| 营盘 | Yingpan | Village |
| 营东沟 | Yingdonggou | Village |
| 马道梁 | Madaoliang | Village |
| 山西沟 | Shanxigou | Village |
| 山东沟 | Shandonggou | Village |
| 山南沟 | Shannangou | Village |
| 小观头 | Xiaoguantou | Village |
| 观西沟 | Guanxigou | Village |
| 姚官岭 | Yaoguanling | Village |
| 小吉祥 | Xiaojixiang | Village |

== Gallery ==
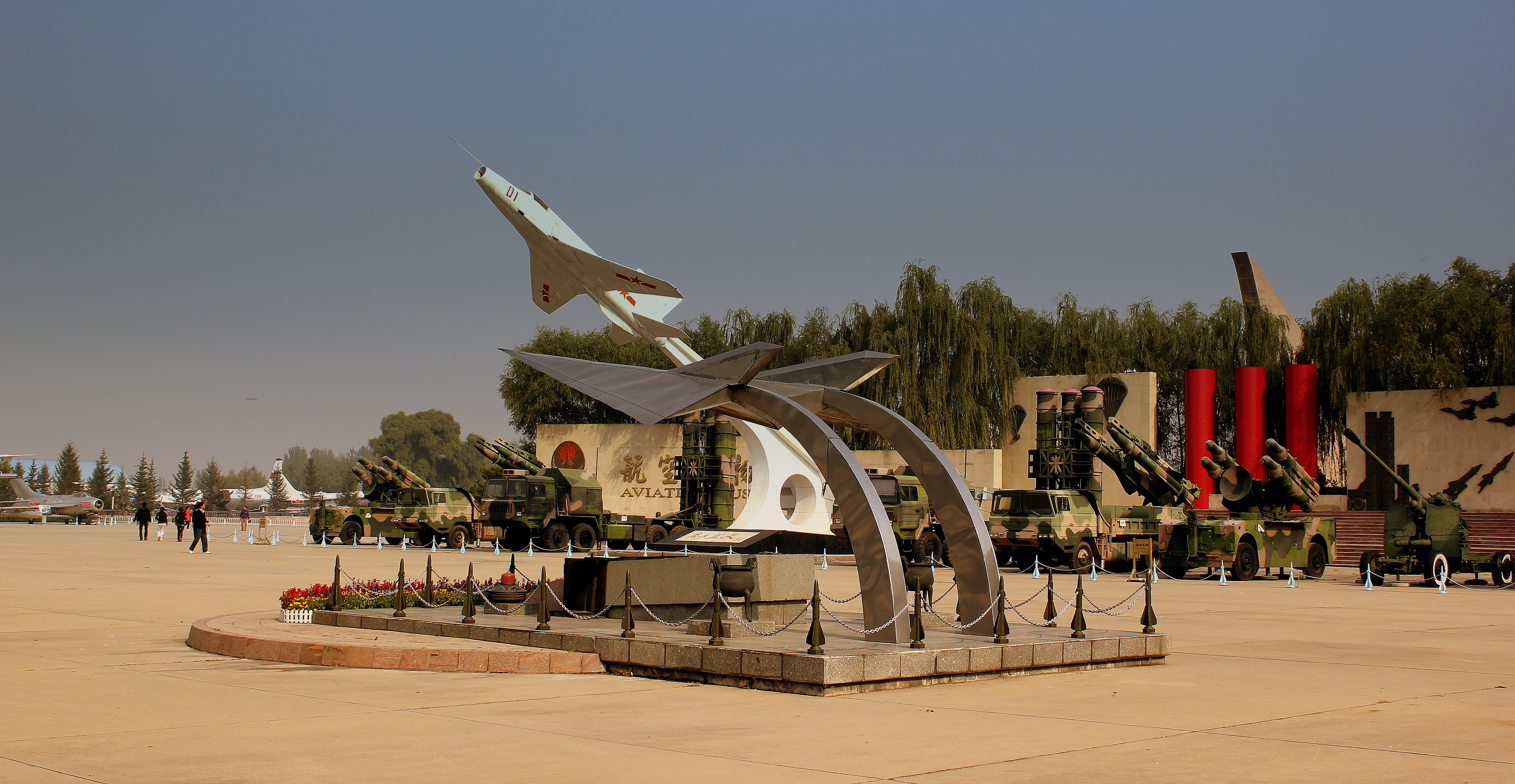
China Aviation Museum at Datanshan, 2012

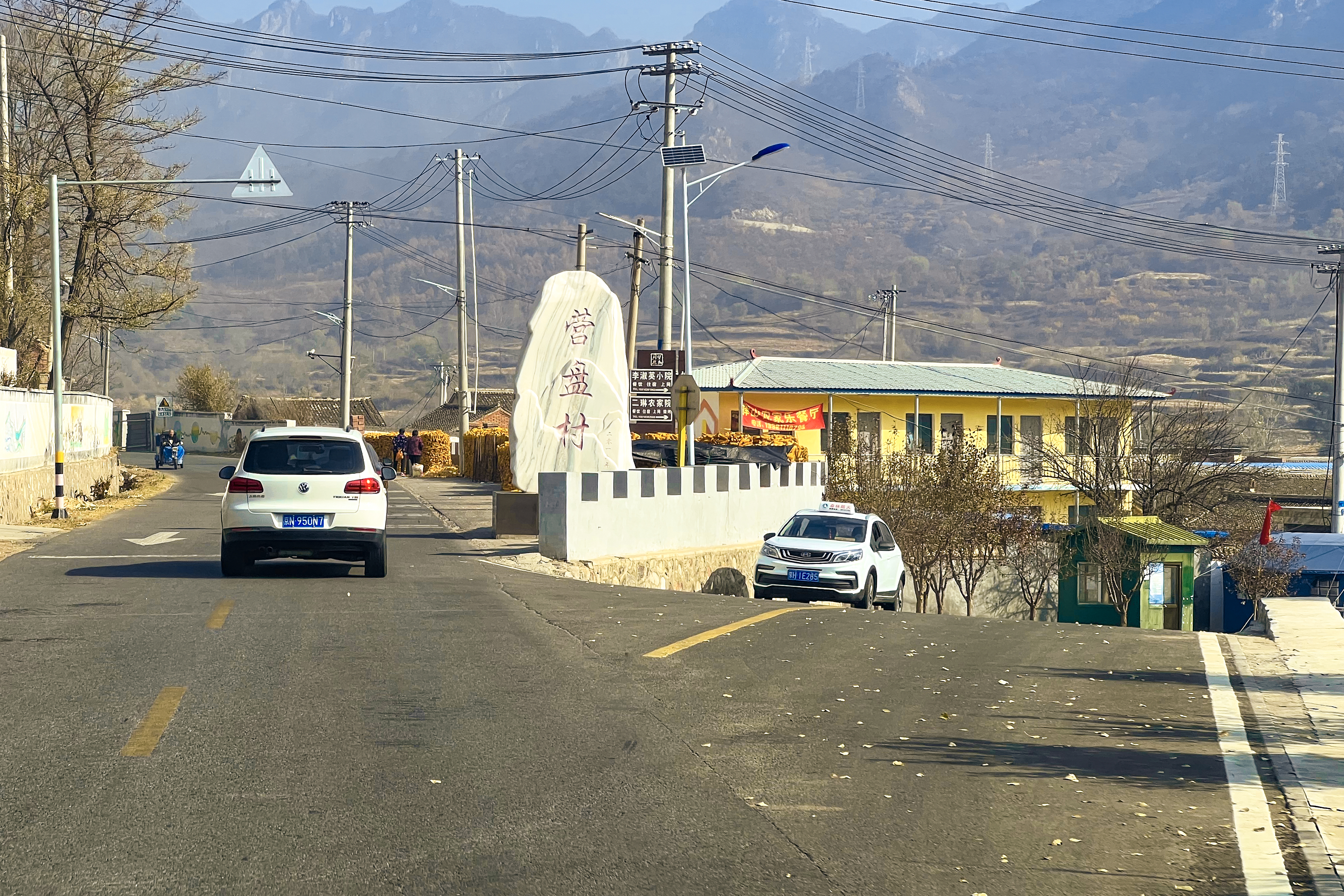
Yingpan Village, 2022

== See also ==
- List of township-level divisions of Beijing
