= Qingyundian =

Qingyundian Town 青云店镇
- Town
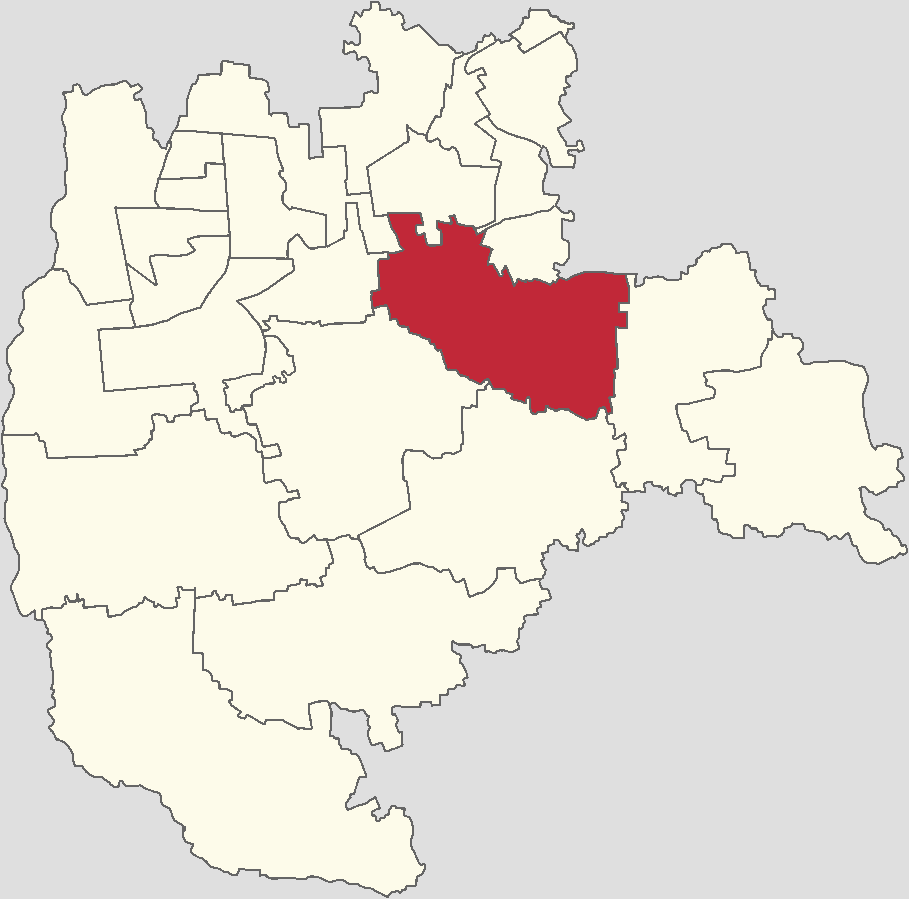
- Location in Daxing District

- Location within Beijing Location within China
- Coordinates: 39°41′03″N 116°29′45″E
- Country: China
- Municipality: Beijing
- District: Daxing
- Village-level Divisions: 2 communities 23 villages

Area
  - Total: 70.48 km^{2} (27.21 sq mi)
- Elevation: 28 m (92 ft)

Population (2020)
  - Total: 69,612
  - Density: 987.7/km^{2} (2,558/sq mi)
- Time zone: UTC+8 (China Standard)
- Postal code: 102605
- Area code: 010

Qingyundian Town (simplified Chinese: 青云店镇; traditional Chinese: 青雲店鎮; pinyin: Qīngyúndiàn Zhèn) is a town located on northeastern Daxing District, Beijing, China. It shares border with Boxing Subdistrict and Yinghai Town to its north, Majuqiao Town to its northeast, Changziying Town to its east, Anding and Weishanzhuang Towns to its south, as well as Huangcun and Xihongmen Towns in its west. According to the 2020 census, the population of Qingyundian was 69,612.

The name Qingyundian (Chinese: 青云店; lit. 'Azure Cloud Shop') originated as an evolved version of Qingrundian (Chinese: 青润店; lit. 'Azure Moist Shop'), which in turn was given for the region's rich soil and abundant water supply during the Qing dynasty.

== History ==
History of Qingyundian Town
Year	Status	Under
1949 - 1953	Qingyundian District	Daxing County
1953 - 1958	Qingyundian Township	Daxing County
1958 - 1961	A part of Caiyu People's Commune	Daxing County
1961 - 1983	Qingyundian People's Commune	Daxing County
1983 - 1990	Qingyundian Township	Daxing County
1990 - 2001	Qingyundian Town (Fashang Township was added in 2000)	Daxing County
2001–present	Qingyundian Town (Fashang Township was added in 2000)	Daxing District

== Administrative divisions ==
As of the year 2021, Qingyundian Town was divided into 25 subdivisions, of those 2 were residential communities, and 23 were villages:

Administrative division code	Subdivision names	Name transliterations	Type
110112209001	于家务西里	Yujiawu Xili	Community
110112209002	永济	Yongji	Community
110112209201	于家务	Yujiawu	Village
110112209202	南仪阁	Nanyige	Village
110112209203	北辛店	Beixindian	Village
110112209204	大耕垡	Dagengfa	Village
110112209205	东马各庄	Dong Magezhuang	Village
110112209206	西马坊	Xi Mafang	Village
110112209207	神仙	Shenxian	Village
110112209208	果村	Guocun	Village
110112209209	渠头村	Qutou Cun	Village
110112209210	富各庄村	Fugezhuang Cun	Village
110112209211	满庄村	Manzhuang Cun	Village
110112209212	王各庄	Wanggezhuang	Village
110112209213	崔各庄	Cuigezhuang	Village
110112209214	南三间房村	Nan Sanjianfang Cun	Village
110112209215	小海字村	Xiaohaizi Cun	Village
110112209216	枣林村	Zaolin Cun	Village
110112209217	吴寺村	Wusi Cun	Village
110112209218	仇庄村	Qiuzhuang Cun	Village
110112209219	南刘庄	Nanliuzhuang	Village
110112209220	东垡村	Dongfa Cun	Village
110112209221	西垡村	Xifa Cun	Village
110112209222	后伏	Houfu	Village
110112209223	前伏	Qianfu	Village

== See also ==
- List of township-level divisions of Beijing
