= Luyuan Subdistrict =

Luyuan Subdistrict 潞源街道
- Subdistrict
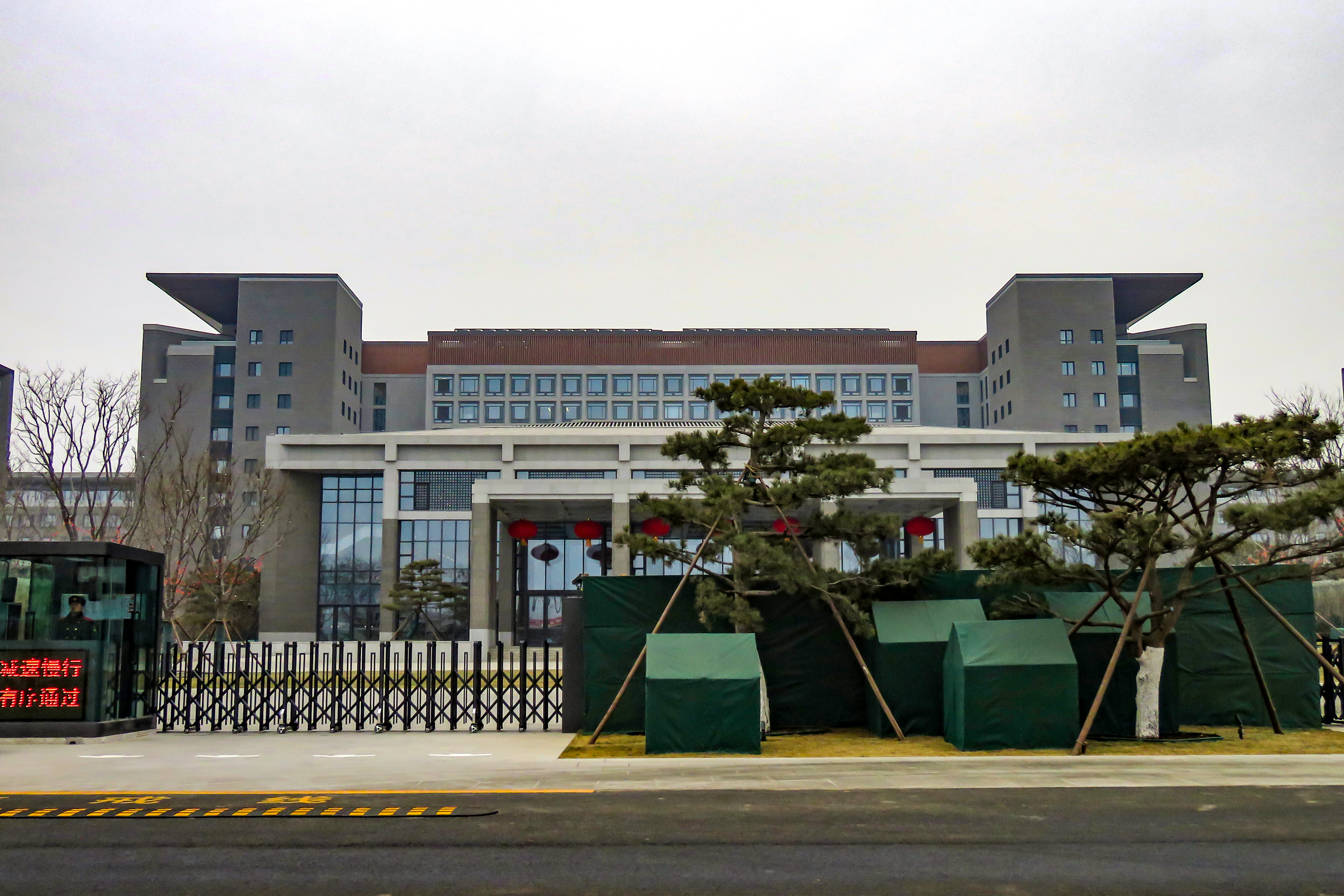
- New headquarters of Beijing municipal government, 2019

- Location within Beijing Location within China
- Coordinates: 39°54′55″N 116°43′07″E
- Country: China
- Municipality: Beijing
- District: Tongzhou
- Village-level Divisions: 6 communities

Area
  - Total: 6.95 km^{2} (2.68 sq mi)

Population (2020)
  - Total: 8,472
  - Density: 1,220/km^{2} (3,160/sq mi)
- Time zone: UTC+8 (China Standard)
- Postal code: 101117
- Area code: 010

Luyuan Subdistrict (Chinese: 潞源街道; pinyin: Lùyuán Jiēdào) is a subdistrict in northern Tongzhou District, Beijing. It borders Lucheng Town in its north and east, Yongshun Town in its south, and Tongyun Subdistrict in its west. As of 2020, it had 8,472 people residing inside its borders.

The subdistrict was created from a portion of Lucheng Town in 2018.

== Administrative divisions ==
Luyuan Subdistrict had 6 residential communities under its administration:

Administrative division code	Subdivision names	Name transliteration
110112007001	含英园东	Hanyingyuan Dong
110112007002	含英园西	Hanyingyuan Xi
110112007003	朗清园北	Langqingyuan Bei
110112007004	朗清园南	Langqingyuan Nan
110112007005	朗清园东	Langqingyuan Dong
110112007401	潞源	Luyuan

== Gallery ==
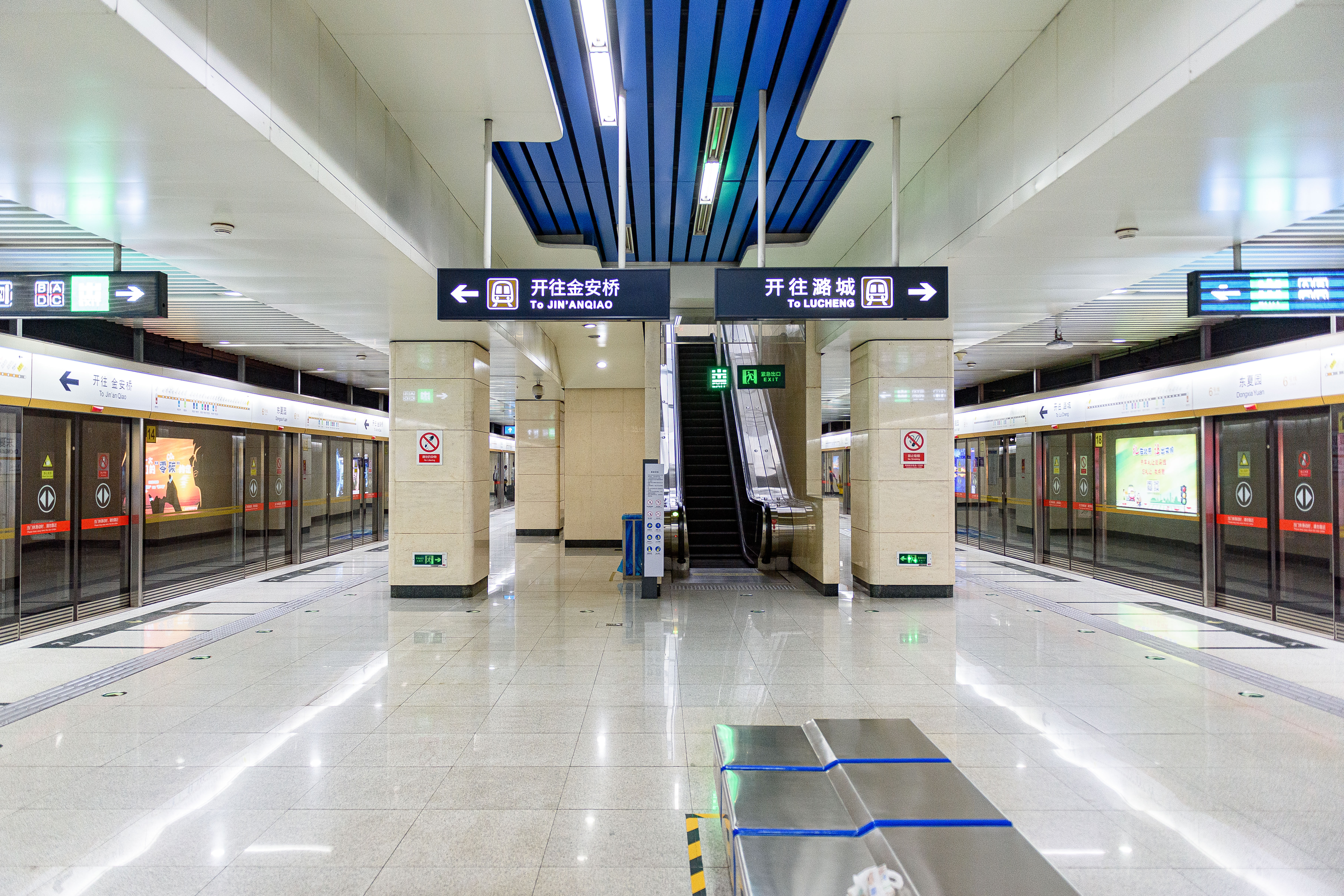
Dongxiayuan Station of Beijing Subway, 2021

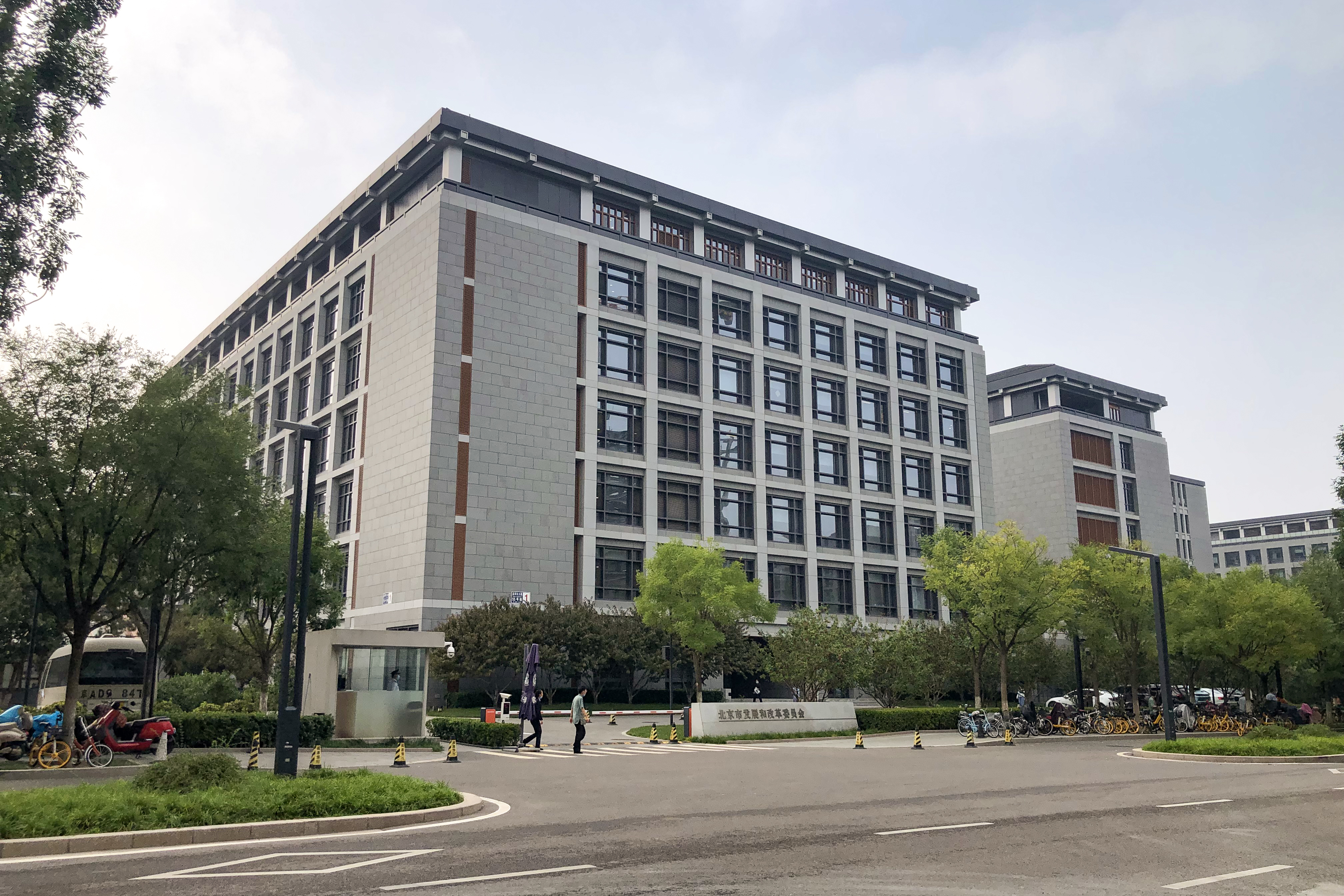
Beijing Municipal Commission of Development and Reform, 2021

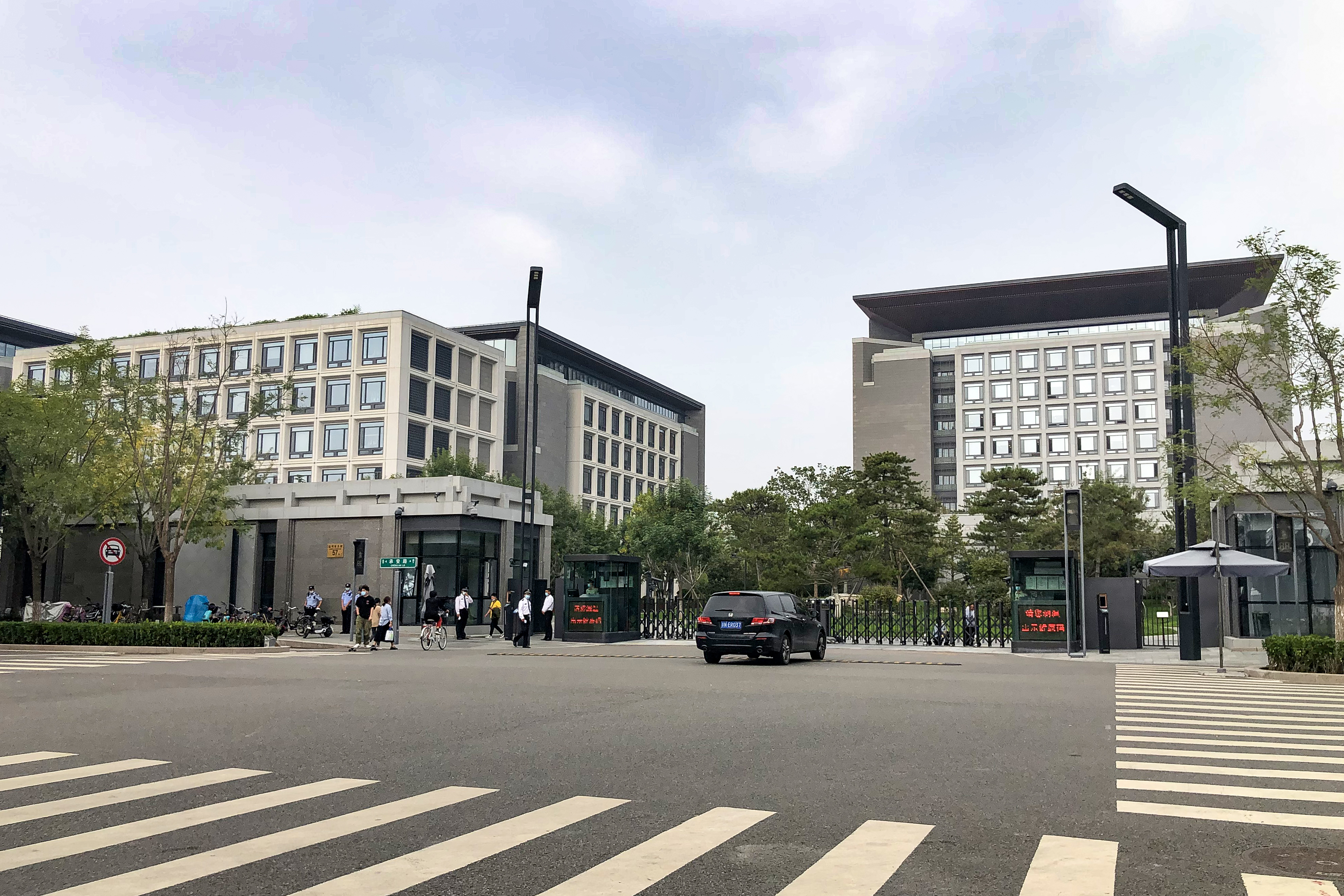
West gate of 57 Yunhe East Ave, 2021

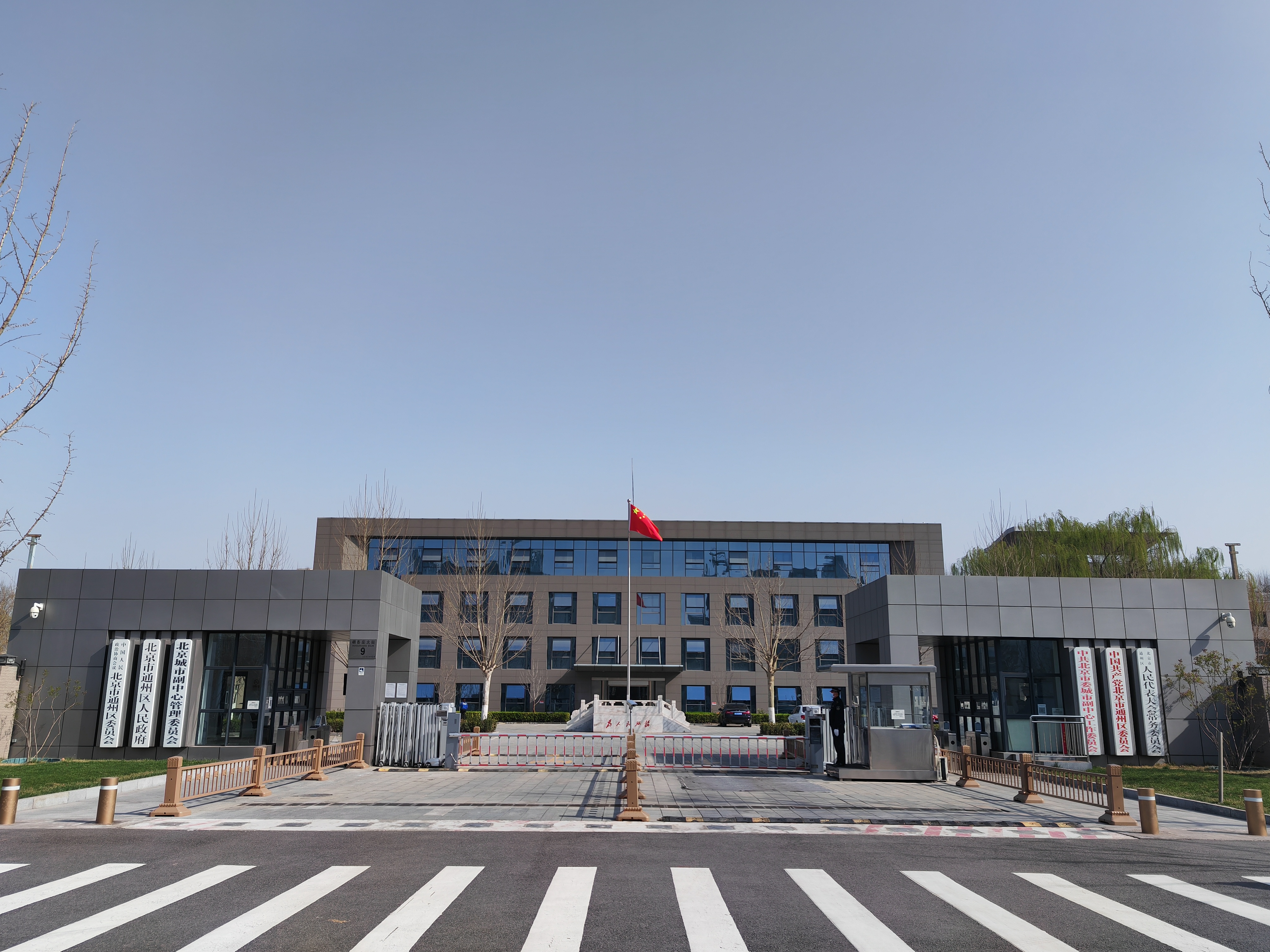
Building of Tongzhou District Government, 2022

== Transport ==
- Luyuan station
- Luyuandong station

== See also ==
- List of township-level divisions of Beijing
