= Beixiaguan Subdistrict =

Beixiaguan Subdistrict 北下关街道
- Subdistrict
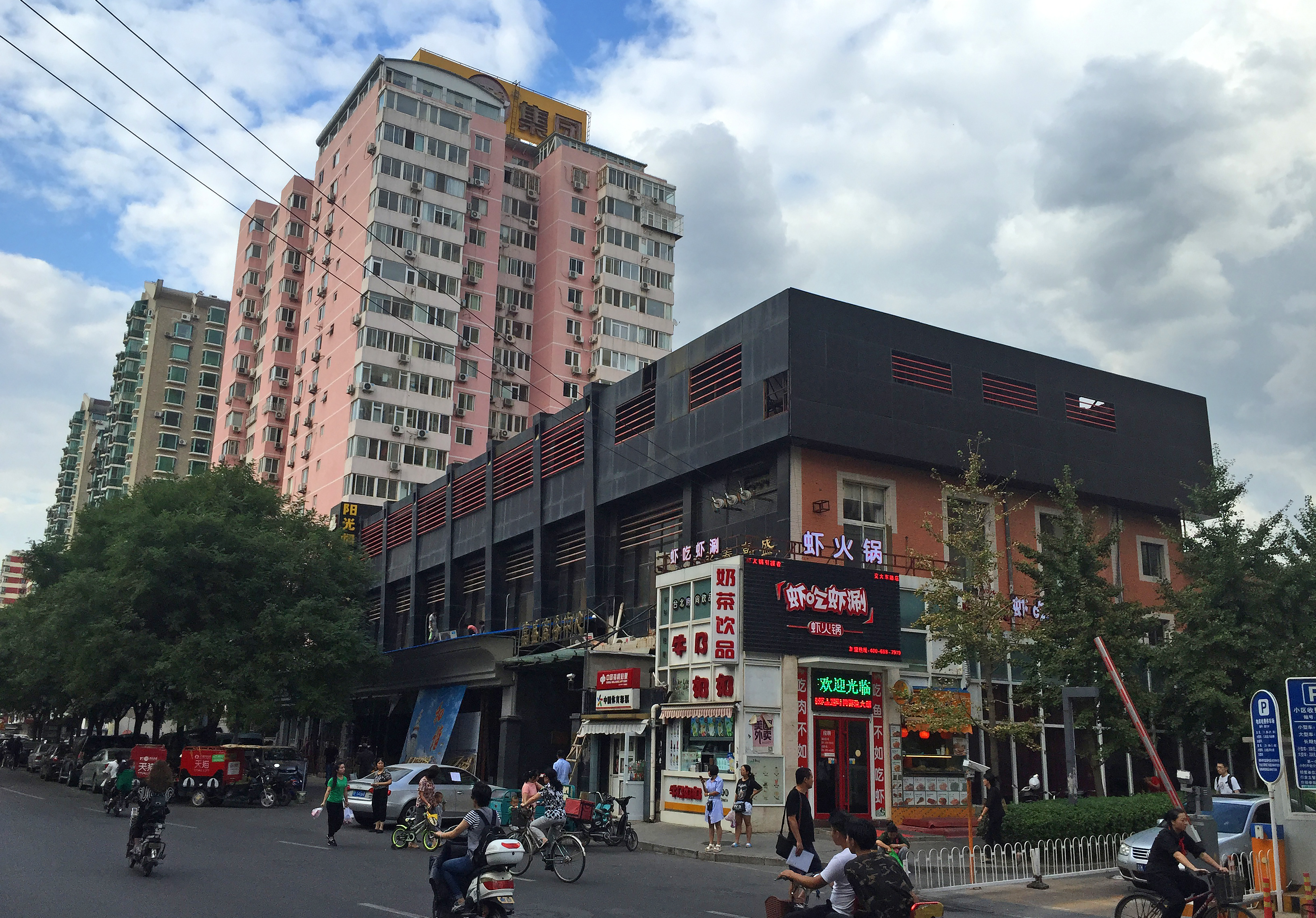
- Shuzhi Jiayuan within the subdistrict, 2016

- Location within Beijing Location within China
- Coordinates: 39°57′24″N 116°19′55″E
- Country: China
- Municipality: Beijing
- District: Haidian
- Village-level Divisions: 31 communities

Area
  - Total: 6.04 km^{2} (2.33 sq mi)
- Elevation: 59 m (194 ft)

Population (2020)
  - Total: 146,366
  - Density: 24,200/km^{2} (62,800/sq mi)
- Time zone: UTC+8 (China Standard)
- Postal code: 100081
- Area code: 010

Beixiaguan Subdistrict (simplified Chinese: 北下关街道; traditional Chinese: 北下關街道; pinyin: Běixiàguān Jiēdào) is a subdistrict located in the southeastern part of the Haidian District, Beijing.

Beijing Jiaotong University is situated in this area. As of 2021, it had 146,366 residents within its borders.

The region was named Beixiaguan (Chinese: 北下关; lit. 'North Below Pass') for its location outside of North Pass of the Xizhimen.

== History ==
Timeline of Beixiaguan Subdistrict
Time	Status
Ming and Qing dynasty	Part of Wanping County, Shuntian Prefecture
1947	Part of the 6th Suburban District
1951	Established as Beixiaguan Subdistrict
1954	Incorporated into Dazhongsi Township
1956	Part of Taipingzhuang Subdistrict
1963	Restored as Beixiaguan Subdistrict
1967	Changed to Beixiaguan Subdistrict Revolutionary Committee
1978	Restored as a subdistrict

== Geography ==
Beixiaguan Subdistrict extends from the Jingbao Railway in the east and adjacent to Beitaipingzhuang Street, and in the west to Zhongguancun South Street and Zizhuyuan Street in the north. The North Third Ring West Road is adjacent to Zhongguancun Street, and the south to the Nanchang River, the west boundary of Beijing Zoo, and the section of Xizhimenwai Street to the south of the Capital Gymnasium is connected to the exhibition road of Xicheng District.

== Administrative Divisions ==
As of 2021, Beixiaguan Subdistrict was subdivided into 31 communities:

Administrative division code	Subdivision names	Name transliteration
110108007001	五塔寺	Wutasi
110108007002	头堆	Toudui
110108007003	北京动物园	Beijing Dongwuyuan
110108007004	钢铁研究总院	Gangtie Yanjiu Zongyuan
110108007005	上园	Shangyuan
110108007006	大慧寺	Dahuisi
110108007007	大柳树	Daliushu
110108007008	大柳树北	Daliushu Bei
110108007009	中国气象局	Zhongguo Qixiangju
110108007010	中关村南大街40号	Zhongguancun Nandajie 40 Hao
110108007012	净土寺	Jingtusi
110108007013	娘娘庙	Niangniangmiao
110108007016	广通苑	Guangtongyuan
110108007018	北京交通大学	Beijing Jiaotong Daxue
110108007019	中国铁道科学研究院	Zhongguo Tiedao Kexue Yanjiuyuan
110108007020	南里	Nanli
110108007021	皂君西里	Zhaojun Xili
110108007022	南里二区	Nanli Erqu
110108007023	农影	Nongying
110108007024	中监所	Zhongjiansuo
110108007025	中国农业科学院	Zhongguo Nongye Kexueyuan
110108007026	国防大学军事文化学院	Guofang Daxue Junshi Wenhua Xueyuan
110108007027	青云南区	Qingyun Nanqu
110108007028	皂君庙	Zhaojunmiao
110108007029	皂君东里	Zhaojun Dongli
110108007030	中央财经大学	Zhongyang Caijing Daxue
110108007031	大钟寺	Dazhongsi
110108007032	皂君庙南路	Zhaojunmiao Nanlu
110108007033	卫生部	Weishengbu
110108007035	海洋环境预报中心	Haiyang Huanjing Yubao Zhongxin
110108007036	交大嘉园	Jiaoda Jiayuan

== See also ==
- List of township-level divisions of Beijing
