= Xiaohongmen =

Xiaohongmen Township 小红门乡
- Township
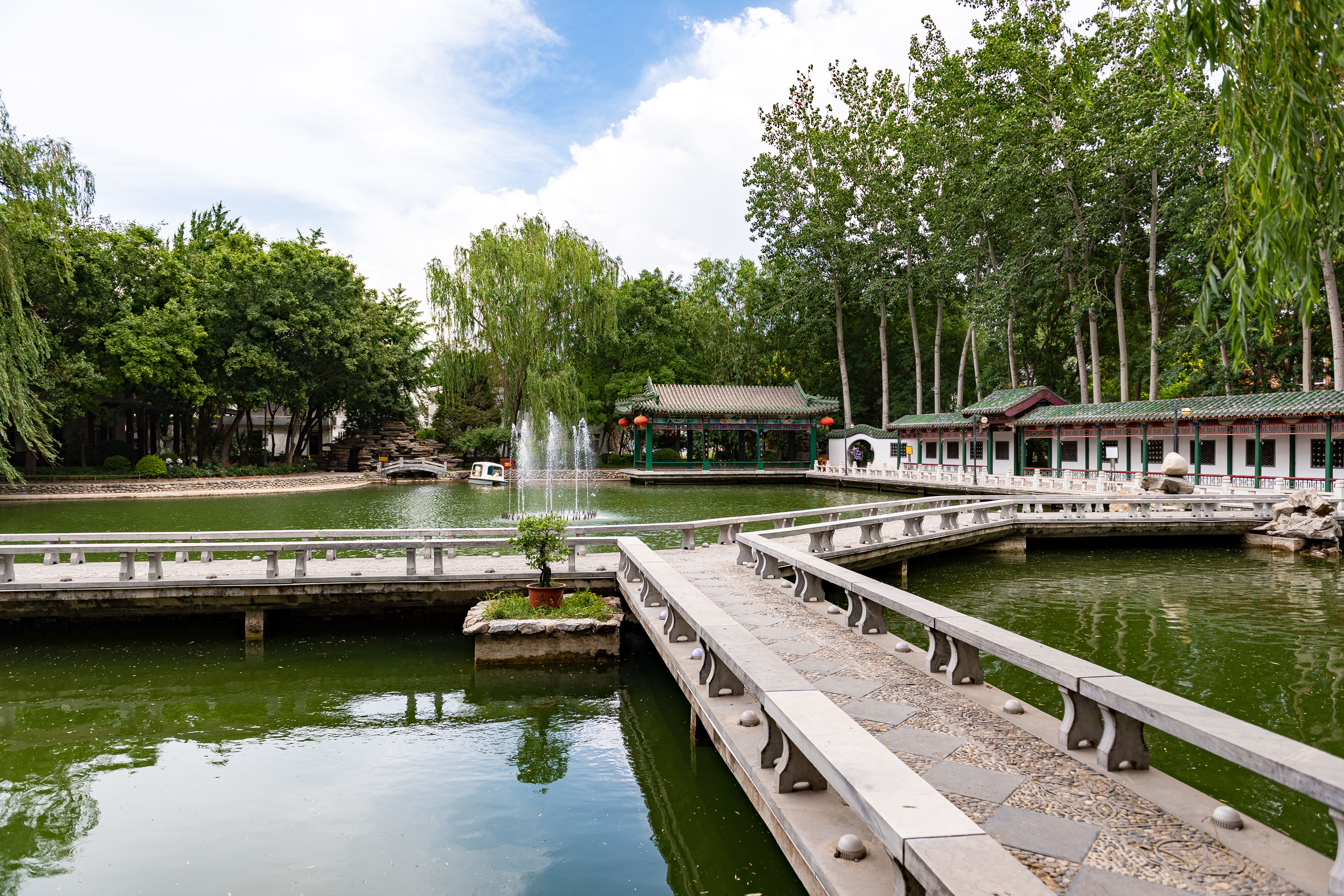
- Artificial lake in the north of the township, 2021

- Location within Beijing Location within China
- Coordinates: 39°50′00″N 116°27′11″E
- Country: China
- Municipality: Beijing
- District: Chaoyang
- Village-level Divisions: 10 communities 4 villages

Area
  - Total: 12.4 km^{2} (4.8 sq mi)

Population (2020)
  - Total: 83,675
  - Density: 6,750/km^{2} (17,500/sq mi)
- Time zone: UTC+8 (China Standard)
- Postal code: 100176
- Area code: 010

Xiaohongmen Township (Chinese: 小红门乡; pinyin: Xiǎohóngmén Xiāng) is a township on the southern part of Chaoyang District, Beijing, China. It borders Shibalidian Township to the northeast, Yizhuang Township to the southeast, Jiugong Township to the southwest, Dahongmen, Dongtiejiangying Subdistricts and Nanyuan Township to the northwest. In the year 2020, it has a total population of 83,675.

The subdistrict was named after Xiaohongmen (Chinese: 小红门; lit. 'Small Red Gate'), a former city gate during the Ming and Qing dynasty.

== History ==
Timetable of changes in the status of Xiaohongmen Township
Year	Status
1958	Incorporated into Chaoyang District
1961	Formed Xiaohongmen People's Commune
1983	Restored as a subdistrict
2002	Became an area while retaining township status

== Administrative Divisions ==
At the end of 2021, there are 14 subdivisions within Xiaohongmen, where 10 are communities and 4 are villages:

Administrative Division Code	Community Name in Simplified Chinese	Community Name in English	Type
110105027001	四道口	Sidaokou	Community
110105027002	三台山	Santaishan	Community
110105027003	玉器厂	Yuqichang	Community
110105027004	恋日绿岛	Lianri Lüdao	Community
110105027009	中海城	Zhonghaicheng	Community
110105027010	鸿博家园第一	Hongbo Jiayuan Diyi	Community
110105027011	鸿博家园第二	Hongbo Jiayuan Di'er	Community
110105027012	鸿博家园第三	Hongbo Jiayuan Disan	Community
110105027013	鸿博家园第四	Hongbo Jiayuan Disi	Community
110105027014	鸿博家园第五	Hongbo Jiayuan Diwu	Community
110105027200	小红门	Xiaohongmen	Village
110105027201	牌坊村	Paifangcun	Desakota
110105027202	龙爪树	Longzhaoshu	Village
110105027203	肖村	Xiaocun	Village

== See also ==
- List of township-level divisions of Beijing
