= Dazhuangke =

Dazhuangke Township 大庄科乡
- Township
- Entrance of Piposhi Temple southwest of the town, 2018

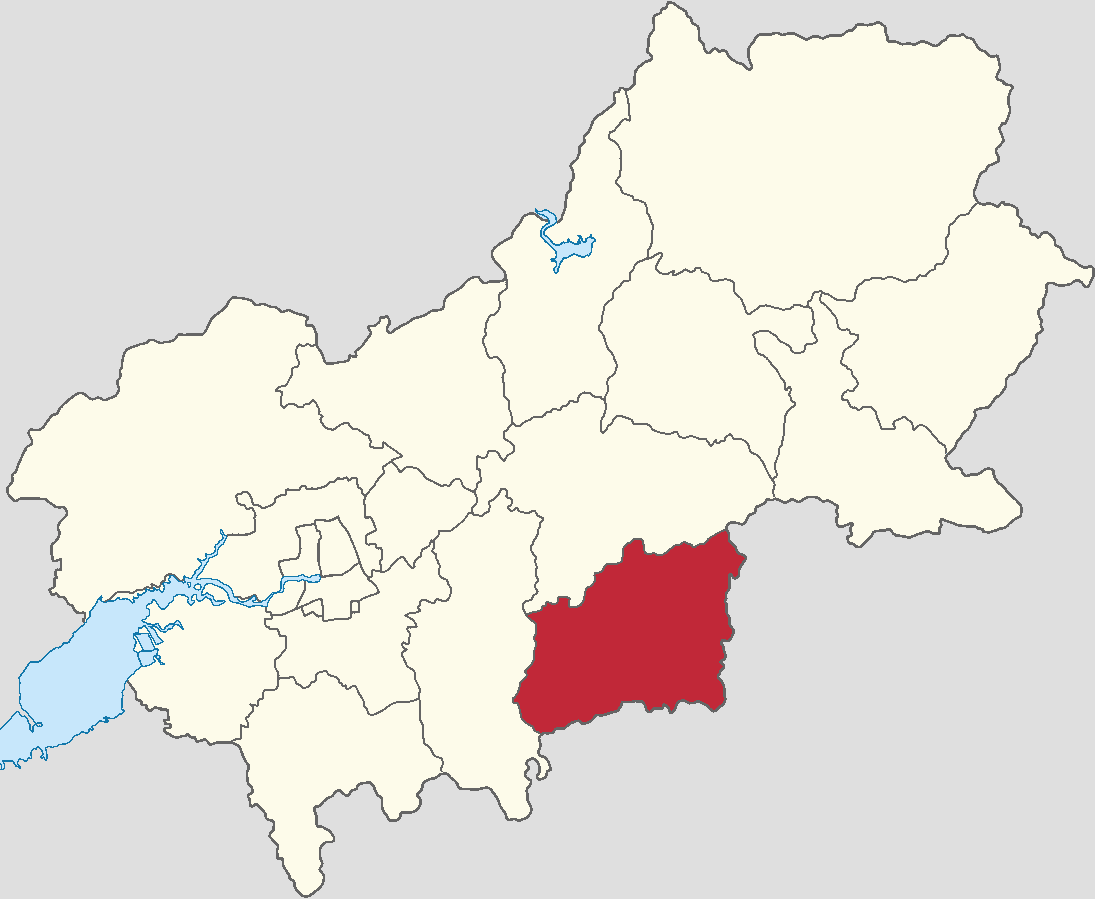
- Location in Yanqing District

- Location within Beijing Location within China
- Coordinates: 40°25′50″N 116°13′46″E
- Country: China
- Municipality: Beijing
- District: Yanqing
- Village-level Divisions: 1 community 29 villages

Area
  - Total: 126.3 km^{2} (48.8 sq mi)
- Elevation: 524 m (1,719 ft)

Population (2020)
  - Total: 4,202
  - Density: 33.27/km^{2} (86.17/sq mi)
- Time zone: UTC+8 (China Standard)
- Postal code: 102106
- Area code: 010

Dazhuangke Township (simplified Chinese: 大庄科乡; traditional Chinese: 大莊科鄉; pinyin: Dàzhuāngkē Xiāng) is a township located inside of Yanqing District, Beijing, China. It shares border with Yongning Town in its north, Jiuduhe and Yanshou Towns in its east, Shisanling Town in its south, and Jingzhuang Town in its west. In the 2020, the township was home to 4,202 inhabitants.

Originally this region was known as Dazhuangke (Chinese: 大庄窠; lit. 'Large Villa Bird's Nest'). But due to the rarity and writing difficulty of the last character 窠, it was later swapped for 科.

== Geography ==
Dazhuangke Township is located entirely within a mountainous area, with parts of the Yan Mountain Range dominating its northern portion. Changchi Road and Datong–Qinhuangdao railway pass through this region.

== History ==
Timetable of Dazhuangke Township
| Year | Status | Under |
|---|---|---|
| 1948 - 1952 | 6th District | Yanqing County, Chahar |
| 1952 - 1956 | 6th District | Yanqing County, Hebei |
| 1956 - 1958 | Tielu Township Dazhuangke Township Dongsancha Township Hanjiachuan Township | Yanqing County, Hebei |
| 1958 - 1961 | Dazhuangke Production Team, Dongfeng People's Commune | Yanqing County, Beijing |
| 1961 - 1983 | Dazhuangke People's Commune | Yanqing County, Beijing |
| 1983 - 2015 | Dazhuangke Township | Yanqing County, Beijing |
| 2015–present | Dazhuangke Township | Yanqing District, Beijing |

== Administrative divisions ==
By the end of 2021, Dazhuangke Township had 30 subdivisions within its borders, of which 1 was a community and 29 were villages. They are listed as follows:

| Subdivision names | Name transliterations | Type |
|---|---|---|
| 大庄科乡 | Dazhuangkexiang | Community |
| 东二道河 | Dong Erdaohe | Village |
| 台自沟 | Taizigou | Village |
| 榆木沟 | Yumugou | Village |
| 东太平庄 | Dong Taipingzhuang | Village |
| 黄土梁 | Huangtuliang | Village |
| 小庄科 | Xiaozhuangke | Village |
| 里长沟 | Lichanggou | Village |
| 大庄科 | Dazhuangke | Village |
| 汉家川河北 | Hanjiachuan Hebei | Village |
| 汉家川河南 | Hanjiachuan Henan | Village |
| 董家沟 | Dongjiagou | Village |
| 慈母川 | Cimuchuan | Village |
| 沙门 | Shamen | Village |
| 景而沟 | Jing'ergou | Village |
| 沙塘沟 | Shatanggou | Village |
| 霹破石 | Piposhi | Village |
| 铁炉 | Tielu | Village |
| 西沙梁 | Xishaliang | Village |
| 瓦庙 | Wamiao | Village |
| 车岭 | Cheling | Village |
| 松树沟 | Songshugou | Village |
| 暖水面 | Nuanshuimian | Village |
| 水泉沟 | Shuiquangou | Village |
| 旺泉沟 | Wangquangou | Village |
| 龙泉峪 | Longquanyu | Village |
| 香屯 | Xiangtun | Village |
| 东三岔 | Dongsancha | Village |
| 解字石 | Jiezishi | Village |
| 东王庄 | Dongwangzhuang | Village |

== See also ==
- List of township-level divisions of Beijing
