= Xinggu Subdistrict =

Xinggu Subdistrict 兴谷街道
- Subdistrict
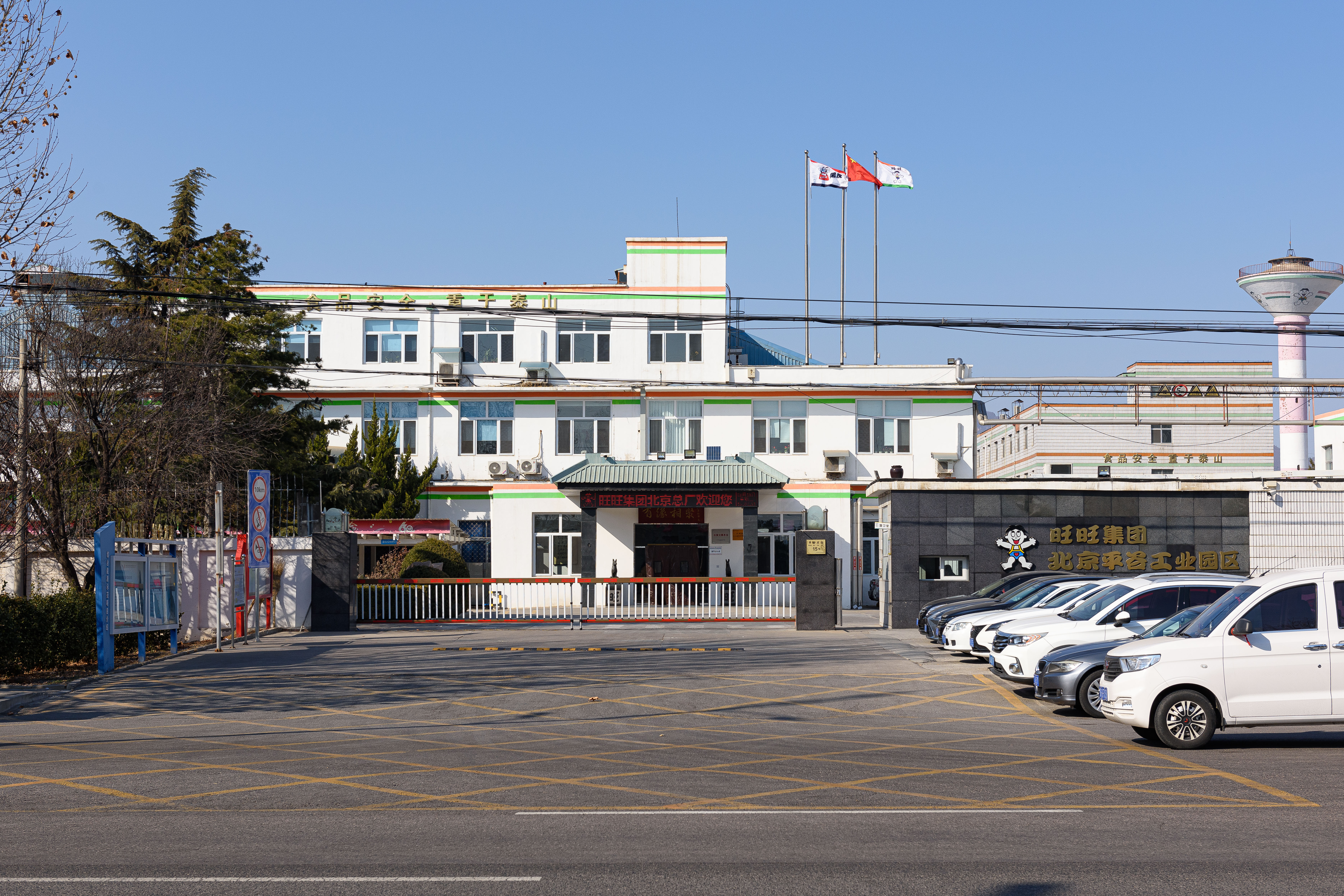
- Want Want Beijing factory within the subdistrict, March 2024

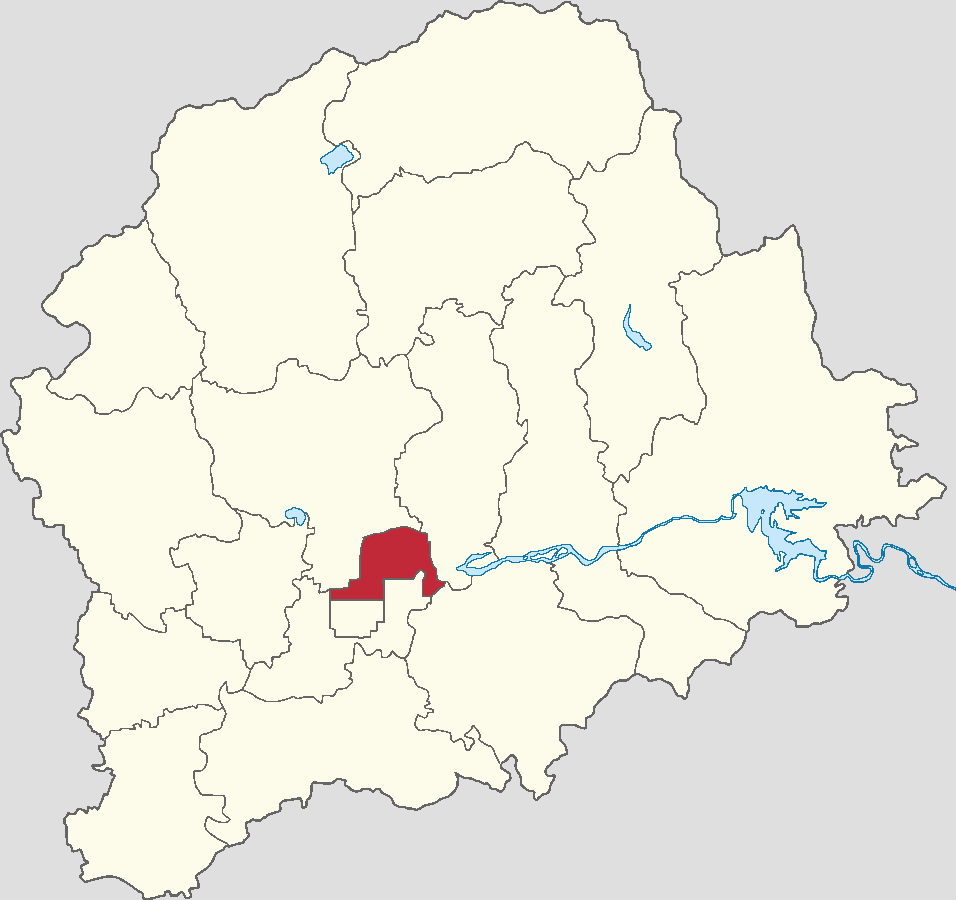
- Location within Pinggu District

- Location within Beijing Location within China
- Coordinates: 40°09′17″N 117°06′45″E
- Country: China
- Municipality: Beijing
- District: Pinggu
- Village-level Divisions: 12 communities 3 villages

Area
  - Total: 9.83 km^{2} (3.80 sq mi)
- Elevation: 33 m (108 ft)

Population (2020)
  - Total: 61,949
  - Density: 6,300/km^{2} (16,300/sq mi)
- Time zone: UTC+8 (China Standard)
- Postal code: 101212
- Area code: 010

Xinggu Subdistrict (simplified Chinese: 兴谷街道; traditional Chinese: 興谷街道; pinyin: Xìnggǔ Jiēdào) is a subdistrict on the center of Pinggu District, Beijing, China. It shares border with Shandongzhuang Town in the northeast, Xiagezhuang Town in the southeast, Pinggu Town and Binhe Subdistrict in the south, and Wangxinzhuang Town in the northwest. The subdistrict had 61,949 people residing under its administration according to the 2020 census. This subdistrict was created from part of Pinggu Town in 2002, and the name Xinggu literally means “Flourish Grain".

== Administrative divisions ==
So far in 2021, Xinggu Subdistrict consists of 15 subdivisions, where 12 of them are communities and 3 of them are villages. They are named in the following list:

| Subdivision names | Name transliterations | Type |
|---|---|---|
| 乐园东 | Leyuan Dong | Community |
| 兴谷园 | Xingguyuan | Community |
| 光明 | Guangming | Community |
| 新星 | Xinxing | Community |
| 金乡东 | Jinxiang Dong | Community |
| 金乡西 | Jinxiang Xi | Community |
| 园丁 | Yuanding | Community |
| 乐园西 | Leyuan Xi | Community |
| 阳光 | Yangguang | Community |
| 兴谷家园 | Xinggu Jiayuan | Community |
| 邑上原著 | Yishang Yuanzhu | Community |
| 腾龙 | Tenglong | Community |
| 杜辛庄 | Duxinzhuang | Village |
| 中罗庄 | Zhongluozhuang | Village |
| 上纸寨 | Shangzhizhai | Village |

== See also ==
- List of township-level divisions of Beijing
