= Wenquan, Beijing =

Wenquan Town 温泉镇
- Town
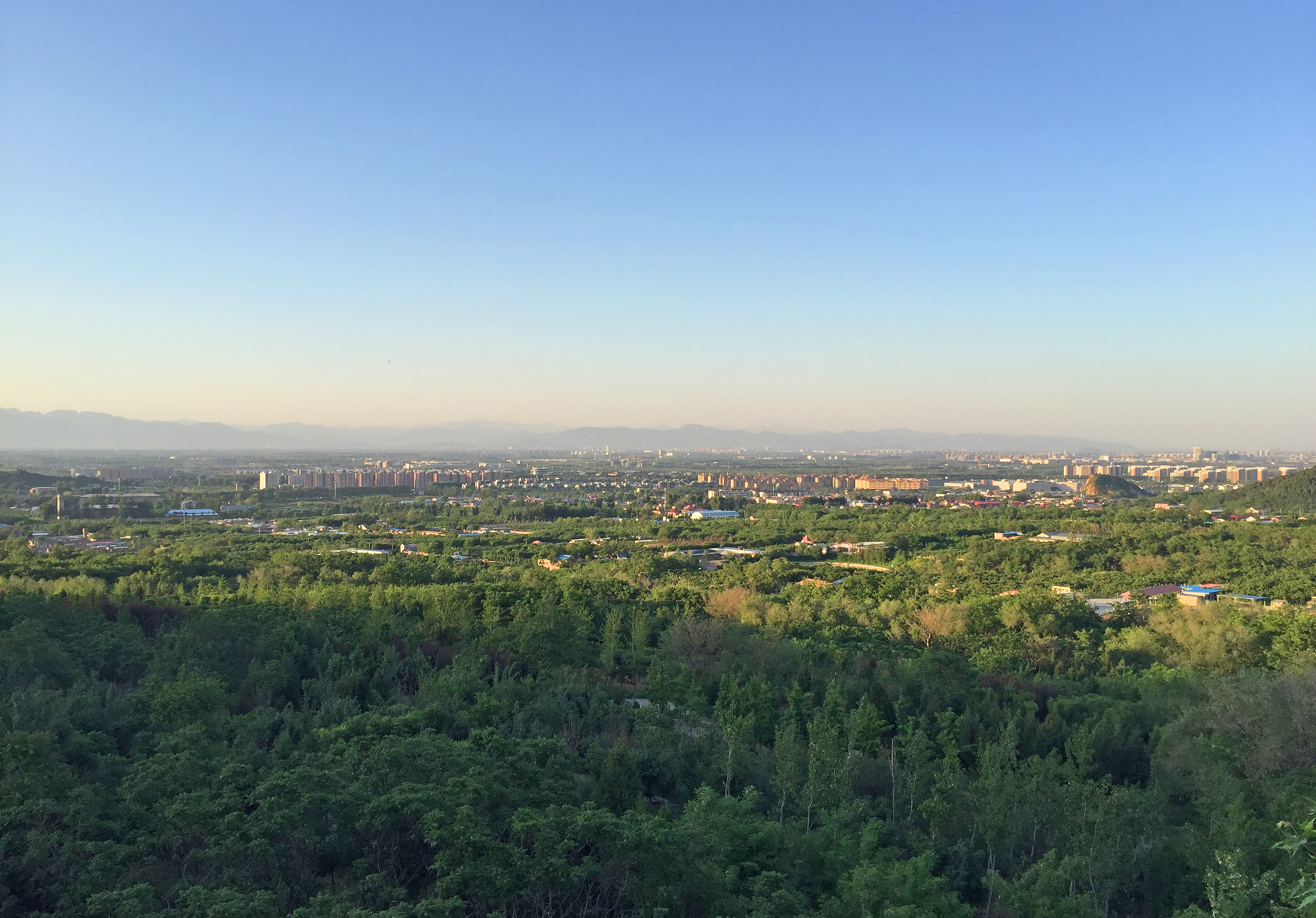
- Aerial view of Wenquan Town, 2016

- Location within Beijing Location within China
- Coordinates: 40°02′51″N 116°10′28″E
- Country: China
- Municipality: Beijing
- District: Haidian
- Village-level Divisions: 13 communities 2 villages 5 residential area

Area
  - Total: 33.17 km^{2} (12.81 sq mi)

Population (2020)
  - Total: 69,165
  - Density: 2,085/km^{2} (5,401/sq mi)
- Time zone: UTC+8 (China Standard)
- Postal code: 100095
- Area code: 010

Wenquan Town (Chinese: 温泉镇; pinyin: Wēnquán Zhèn) is a town on the west of Haidian District, Beijing, China. It borders Xibeiwan Town in its east, Xiangshan Subdistrict in its southeast, Junzhuang Town in its southwest, and Sujiatuo Town in its west and north. The population was 69,165 as of 2020.

The name Wenquan (Chinese: 温泉; lit. 'Hot Spring') refers to a hotspring north of Tangzi Mountain within the region.

== History ==
Timetable of Wenquan Area
| Year | Status |
|---|---|
| 1949 | Wenquan Town, part of the 13th District of Peiping |
| 1953 | Established as Wenquan Township |
| 1956 | Incorporated Baijiatong Township |
| 1958 | Part of Yongfeng People's Commune |
| 1961 | Separated from Yongfeng and formed its own commune |
| 1978 | Incorporated into Dongbeiwang People's Commune |
| 1984 | Restored as a township |
| 1997 | Changed into a town |
| 2011 | Became an area while retaining the status as a town |

== Administrative divisions ==
As of 2021, Wenquan Area consisted of 20 subdivisions, including 13 communities, 2 villages and 5 residential area:

| Administrative division code | Subdivision names | Name transliteration | Type |
|---|---|---|---|
| 110108026001 | 温泉 | Wenquan | Community |
| 110108026002 | 白家疃 | Baijiatong | Community |
| 110108026004 | 航材院 | Hangcaiyuan | Community |
| 110108026005 | 三零四所 | Sanlingsisuo | Community |
| 110108026006 | 西颐 | Xiyi | Community |
| 110108026007 | 颐阳一区 | Yiyang Yiqu | Community |
| 110108026008 | 颐阳二区 | Yiyang Erqu | Community |
| 110108026009 | 杨庄 | Yangzhuang | Community |
| 110108026010 | 辰尚 | Chenshang | Community |
| 110108026011 | 凯盛家园 | Kaisheng Jiayuan | Community |
| 110108026012 | 温泉水岸家园 | Wenquan Shui'an Jiayuan | Community |
| 110108026013 | 环保园 | Huanbaoyuan | Community |
| 110108026014 | 创客 | Chuanke | Community |
| 110108026203 | 温泉 | Wenquan | Village |
| 110108026204 | 白家疃 | Baijiatong | Village |
| 110108026500 | 高里掌村 | Gaolizhangcun | Cooperative Residential Area |
| 110108026501 | 辛庄村 | Xinzhuangcun | Cooperative Residential Area |
| 110108026502 | 杨家庄村 | Yangjiazhuangcun | Cooperative Residential Area |
| 110108026503 | 太舟坞村 | Taizhouwucun | Cooperative Residential Area |
| 110108026504 | 东埠头村 | Dongfutoucun | Cooperative Residential Area |

== See also ==
- List of township-level divisions of Beijing
