= Haidian Subdistrict =

Haidian Subdistrict 海淀街道
- Subdistrict
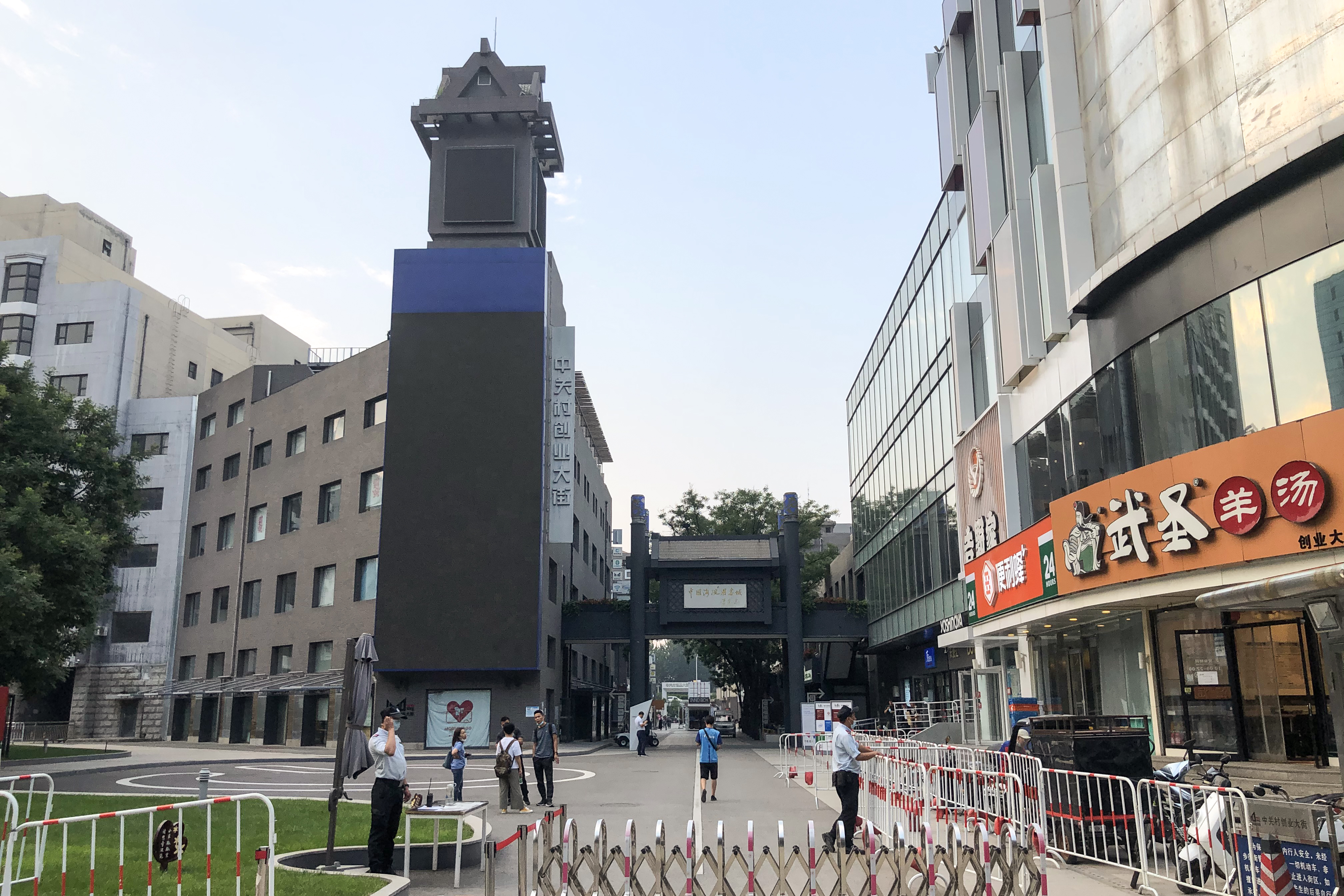
- Haidian Book City, 2020

- Location within Beijing Location within China
- Coordinates: 39°54′48″N 116°18′19″E
- Country: China
- Municipality: Beijing
- District: Haidian
- Village-level Divisions: 32 communities

Area
  - Total: 6.79 km^{2} (2.62 sq mi)

Population (2020)
  - Total: 123,191
  - Density: 18,100/km^{2} (47,000/sq mi)
- Time zone: UTC+8 (China Standard)
- Postal code: 100080
- Area code: 010

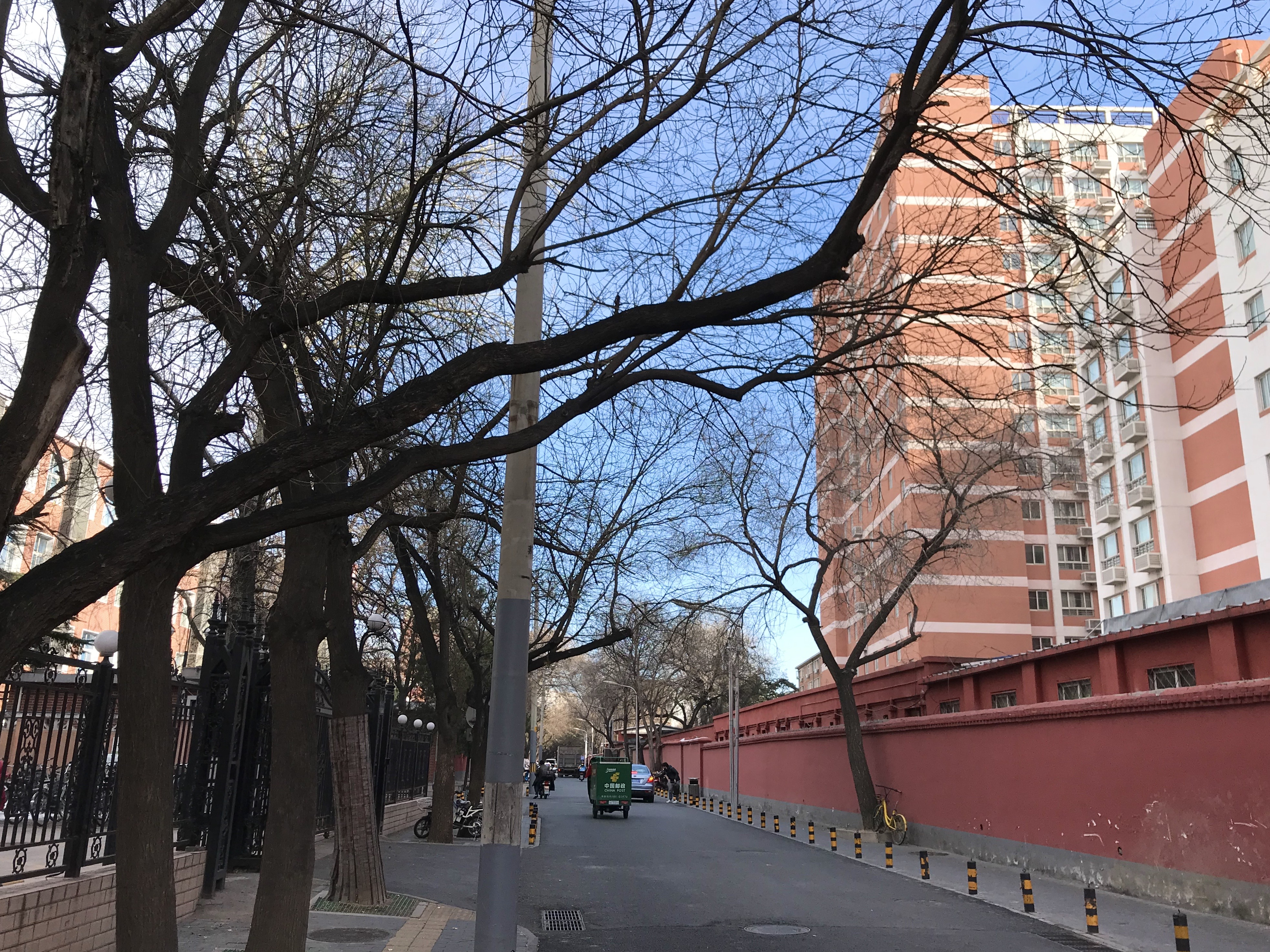
Renmin University North Rd

Haidian Subdistrict (Chinese: 海淀街道; pinyin: Hǎidiàn Jiēdào) is one of the 22 subdistricts inside of Haidian District, Beijing, China. It is on the south of Haidian District, shares border with Wanliu Area and Yanyuan Subdistrict in its north, Zhongguancun Subdistrict in its east, Zizhuyuan Subdistrict in its south, and Shuguang Subdistrict in its west. As of 2020, it was home to 123,191 residents.

== History ==
This area was first organized into Haidian Town in 1949, and then converted to a subdistrict in 1954.

== Administrative Divisions ==
In the year 2021, there were 32 communities within Haidian Subdistrict:

Administrative division code	Subdivision names	Name transliteration
110108012003	海淀路	Haidianlu
110108012004	芙蓉里	Furongli
110108012005	稻香园北	Daoxiangyuan Bei
110108012006	稻香园南	Daoxiangyuan Nan
110108012007	苏州街路	Suzhoujielu
110108012008	倒座庙	Daozuomiao
110108012009	合建楼	Hejianlou
110108012010	海淀南路北	Haidian Nanlu Bei
110108012011	海淀南路南	Haidian Nanlu Nan
110108012012	三环	Sanhuan
110108012013	友谊	Youyi
110108012014	三义庙	Sanyimiao
110108012015	立新	Lixin
110108012016	小南庄	Xiaonanzhuang
110108012017	万泉庄南	Wanquanzhuang Nan
110108012018	新区	Xinqu
110108012019	稻香园西里	Daoxiangyuan Xili
110108012020	万泉庄北	Wanquanzhuang Bei
110108012021	紫金庄园	Zijin Zhuangyuan
110108012024	人大附中	Renda Fuzhong
110108012025	人民大学	Renmin Daxue
110108012026	人大南	Renda Nan
110108012027	飞达	Feida
110108012028	苏州桥西	Suzhouqiao Xi
110108012029	航空港	Hangkonggang
110108012030	光大锋尚园	Guangda Fengshangyuan
110108012031	汇新家园	Huixin Jiayuan
110108012032	新起点怡秀园	Xinqidian Yixiuyuan
110108012033	阳春新纪元	Yangchun Xinjiyuan
110108012034	万泉新新家园	Wanquan Xinxin Jiayuan
110108012035	碧水云天	Bishui Yuntian
110108012036	康桥蜂鸟园	Kangqiao Fengniaoyuan

== See also ==
- List of township-level divisions of Beijing
