= Qinghuayuan Subdistrict =

Qinghuayuan Subdistrict 清华园街道
- Subdistrict
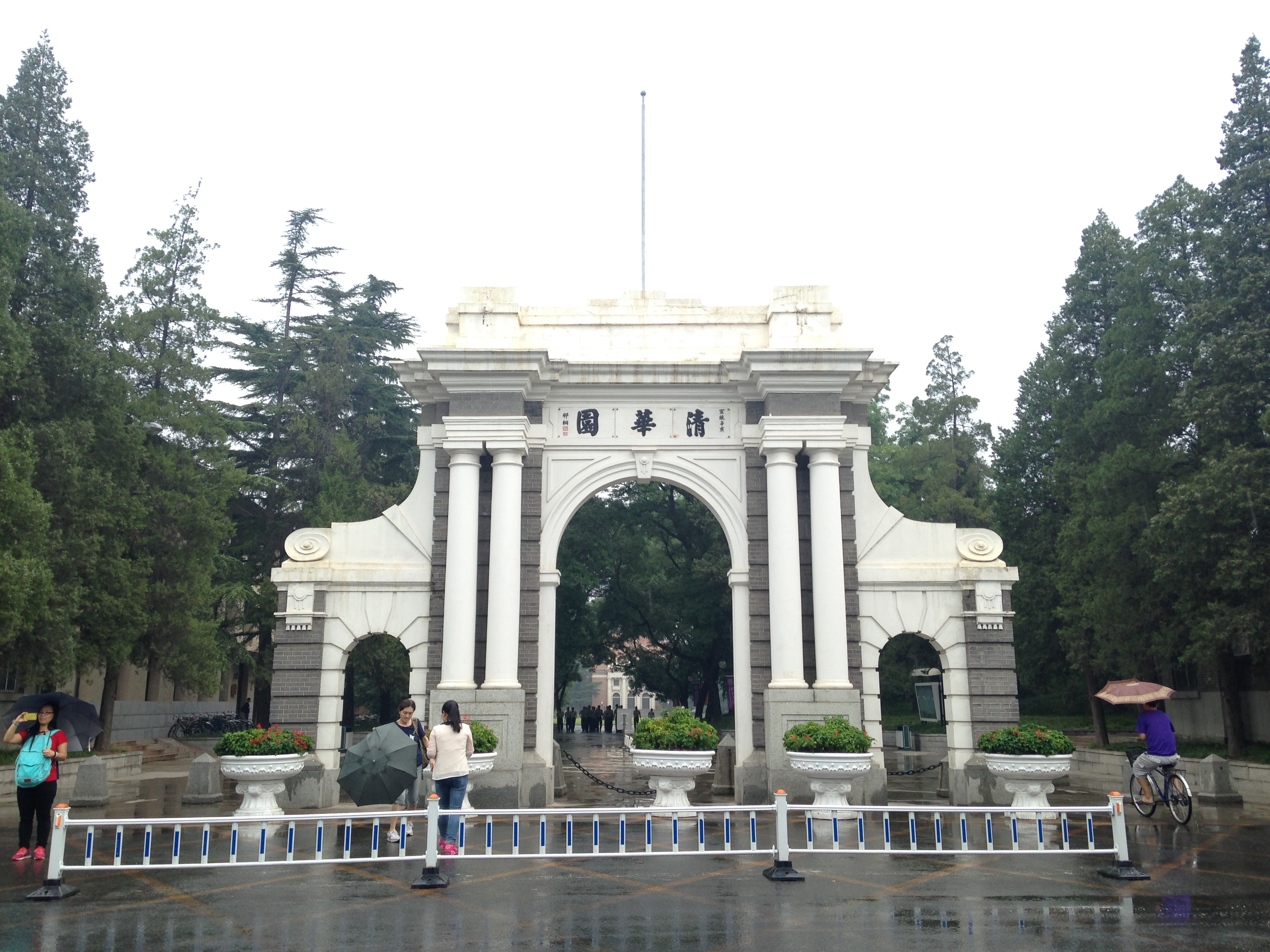
- Former Gate of Tsinghua University, 2015

- Location within Beijing Location within China
- Coordinates: 39°59′54″N 116°19′07″E
- Country: China
- Municipality: Beijing
- District: Haidian
- Village-level Divisions: 10 communities

Area
  - Total: 3.51 km^{2} (1.36 sq mi)
- Elevation: 55 m (180 ft)

Population (2020)
  - Total: 56,592
  - Density: 16,100/km^{2} (41,800/sq mi)
- Time zone: UTC+8 (China Standard)
- Postal code: 100084
- Area code: 010

Qinghuayuan Subdistrict (simplified Chinese: 清华园街道; traditional Chinese: 清華園街道; pinyin: Qīnghuáyuán Jiēdào) is a subdistrict of Haidian District, Beijing, It shares border with Dongsheng Town in the northeast, Xueyuan Road Subdistrict in the east, Yanyuan and Zhongguancun Subdistricts in the south, and Qinglongqiao Subdistrict in the northwest. As of 2020, it had a population of 56,592 under its administration.

"Qinghuayuan" means Tsinghua (University) Garden, referring to the fact it covers much of Tsinghua's campus, and the subdistrict is therefore administered jointly by Haidian District and university officials.

== History ==
Timeline of Qinghuayuan Subdistrict's History
Year	Status
1909	The region was chosen for the construction of a college, which would later become the Tsinghua University
1949	Part of the 16th District
1956	Part of Haidianzhen Subdistrict
1958	Part of Haidian People's Commune
1961	Part of Zhongguancun Subdistrict
1980	Separated from Zhongguancun and created as Qinghuayuan Subdistrict

== Administrative Divisions ==
As of 2021, Qinghuayuan Subdistrict was subdivided into 10 residential communities, all of which are listed below:

Administrative division code	Subdivision names	Name transliteration
110108014001	东楼	Donglou
110108014002	南楼	Nanlou
110108014003	西楼	Xilou
110108014004	北区	Beiqu
110108014005	中楼	Zhonglou
110108014006	西南	Xinan
110108014007	西北	Xibei
110108014008	蓝旗营	Lanqiying
110108014009	荷清苑	Heqingyuan
110108014010	双清苑	Shuangqingyuan

== See also ==
- List of township-level divisions of Beijing
