= Xiagezhuang =

Xiagezhuang Town 夏各庄镇
- Town
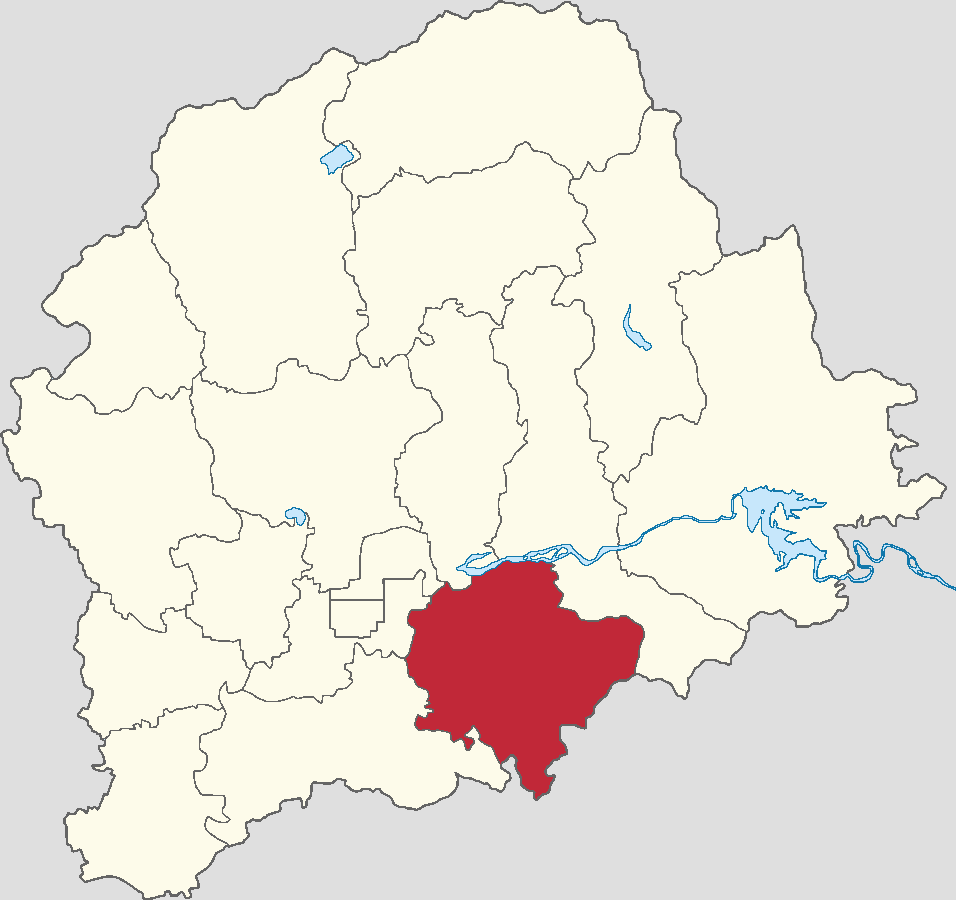
- Location of Xiagezhuang Town in Pinggu District

- Location within Beijing Location within China
- Coordinates: 40°07′23″N 117°10′06″E
- Country: China
- Municipality: Beijing
- District: Pinggu
- Village-level Divisions: 3 communities 15 villages

Area
  - Total: 60.71 km^{2} (23.44 sq mi)
- Elevation: 27 m (89 ft)

Population (2020)
  - Total: 26,185
  - Density: 431.3/km^{2} (1,117/sq mi)
- Time zone: UTC+8 (China Standard)
- Postal code: 101213
- Area code: 010

Xiagezhuang Town (simplified Chinese: 夏各庄镇; traditional Chinese: 夏各莊鎮; pinyin: Xiàgèzhuāng Zhèn) is a town located inside of Pinggu District, Beijing, China. It is situated near the alluvial plain of Ju River. The town shares border with Shandongzhuang Town in the north, Nandulehe Town in the east, Xujiatai Village and Duanjialing Town in the south, Donggaocun Town in the southwest, as well as Pinggu Town and Xinggu Subdistrict in the northwest. It was home to 26,185 inhabitants as of 2020.

The name Xiagezhuang (Chinese: 夏各庄; lit. 'Xia Family's Villa') refers to Xiagezhuang Village, where the town's government is located.

== History ==
Timetable of Xiagezhuang Town
Year	Status	Belonged to
1945 - 1950	1st District 2nd District	Pinggu County, Hebei
1950 - 1953	1st District	Pinggu County, Hebei
1953 - 1956	Jitaiwu Township Xiagezhuang Township Angu Township Magehzuang Township	Pinggu County, Hebei
1956 - 1958	Zhanggezhuang Township	Pinggu County, Hebei
1958 - 1961	Zhanggezhuang Management Area, under Chengguan People's Commune	Pinggu County, Beijing
1961 - 1980	Zhanggezhuang People's Commune	Pinggu County, Beijing
1980 - 1984	Xiagezhuang People's Commune	Pinggu County, Beijing
1984 - 1996	Xiagezhuang Township	Pinggu County, Beijing
1996 - 2002	Xiagezhuang Town	Pinggu County, Beijing
2002	Xiagezhuang Town	Pinggu District, Beijing

== Administrative divisions ==
So far in 2021, Xiagezhuang Town has direct jurisdiction over 18 subdivisions, with 3 of them being communities and 15 of them being villages. They are, by the order of their Administrative Division Codes:

Subdivision names	Name transliterations	Type
礼义园	Liyiyuan	Community
知义园	Zhiyiyuan	Community
仁义园	Renyiyuan	Community
张各庄	Zhanggezhuang	Village
杨各庄	Yanggezhuang	Village
马各庄	Magezhuang	Village
龙家务	Longjiawu	Village
贤王庄	Xianwangzhuang	Village
王都庄	Wangduzhuang	Village
陈太务	Chentaiwu	Village
纪太务	Jitaiwu	Village
魏太务	Weitaiwu	Village
南太务	Nantaiwu	Village
夏各庄	Xiagezhuang	Village
安固	Angu	Village
稻地	Daodi	Village
杨庄户	Yangzhuanghu	Village
大岭后	Dalinghou	Village

== See also ==
- List of township-level divisions of Beijing
