= Huangsongyu Township =

Huangsongyu Township 黄松峪乡
- Township
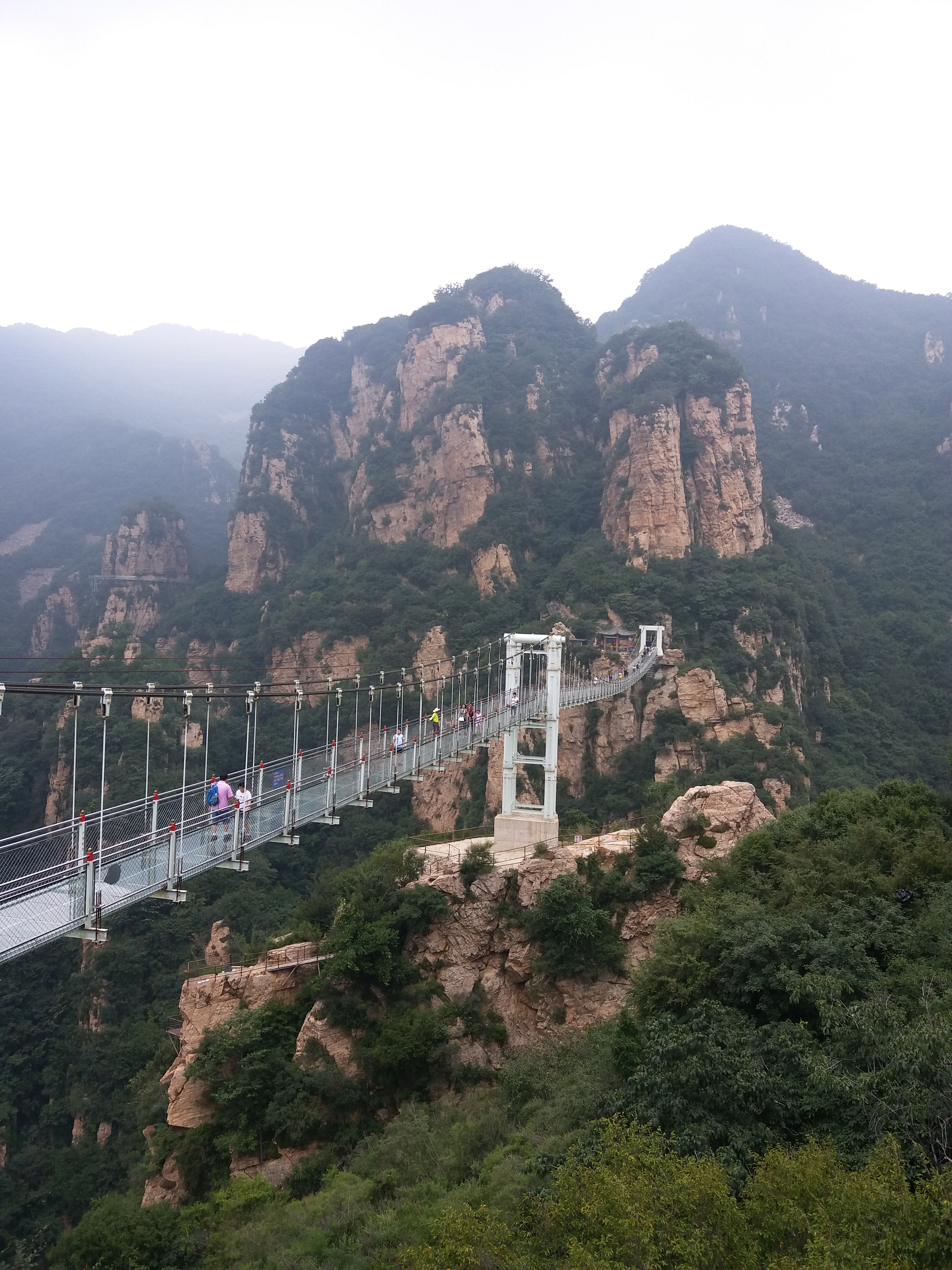
- Glass bridge at Tianyun Mountain, 2018

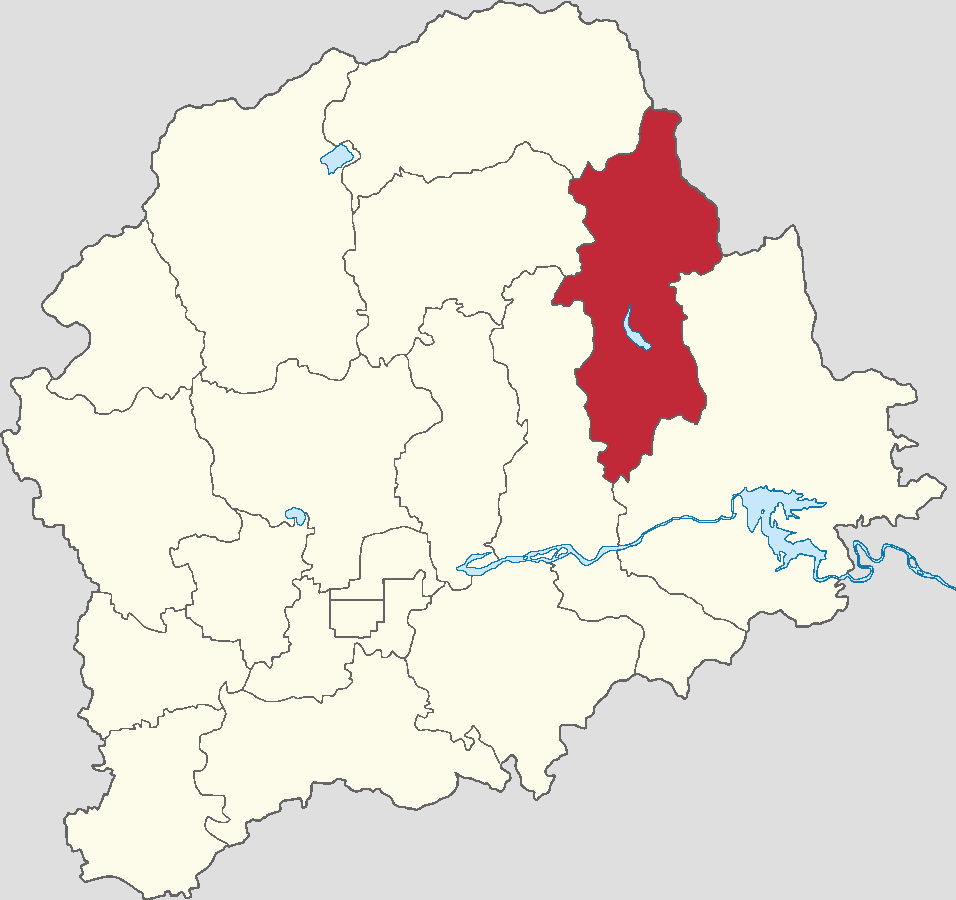
- Location of Huangsongyu Township in Pinggu District

- Location within Beijing Location within China
- Coordinates: 40°13′28″N 117°15′30″E
- Country: China
- Municipality: Beijing
- District: Pinggu
- Village-level Divisions: 7 villages

Area
  - Total: 64.56 km^{2} (24.93 sq mi)
- Elevation: 153 m (502 ft)

Population (2020)
  - Total: 5,062
  - Density: 78.41/km^{2} (203.1/sq mi)
- Time zone: UTC+8 (China Standard)
- Postal code: 101201
- Area code: 010

Huangsongyu Township (simplified Chinese: 黄松峪乡; traditional Chinese: 黃松峪鄉; pinyin: Huángsōngyù Xiāng) is a township in the northeast corner of Pinggu District, Beijing, China. It lies south of the Yan Mountain Range. The township is located to the south of Douziyu Township, west of Jinhaihu Town, north of Nandulehe Town, and east of Xiong'erzhai Township and Zhenluoying Town. According to the 2020 census, Huangsongyu's population was 5,062.

The town was named Huangsongyu (Chinese: 黄松峪; lit. 'Yellow Pine Ravine') after Huangsongyu Village, where the town's government is located.

== History ==
History of Huangsongyu Township
| Year | Status | Belonged to |
|---|---|---|
| 1950–1953 | under 3rd District | Pinggu County, Hebei |
| 1953–1956 | under 3rd and 6th District | Pinggu County, Hebei |
| 1956–1958 | Tawa Township Zuwu Township | Pinggu County, Hebei |
| 1958–1961 | Huangsongyu Management Area, under Hanzhuang People's Commune | Pinggu County, Beijing |
| 1961–1984 | Huangsongyu People's Commune | Pinggu County, Beijing |
| 1984–2002 | Huangsongyu Township | Pinggu County, Beijing |
| 2002–present | Huangsongyu Township | Pinggu District, Beijing |

== Administrative divisions ==
As of the time in writing, Huangsongyu Township was composed of 7 villages, all of which can be seen in the following table:

| Subdivision names | Name transliterations |
|---|---|
| 黄松峪 | Huangsongyu |
| 黑豆峪 | Heidouyu |
| 白云寺 | Baiyunsi |
| 大东沟 | Dadonggou |
| 梨树沟 | Lishugou |
| 塔洼 | Tawa |
| 刁窝 | Diaowo |

== Gallery ==
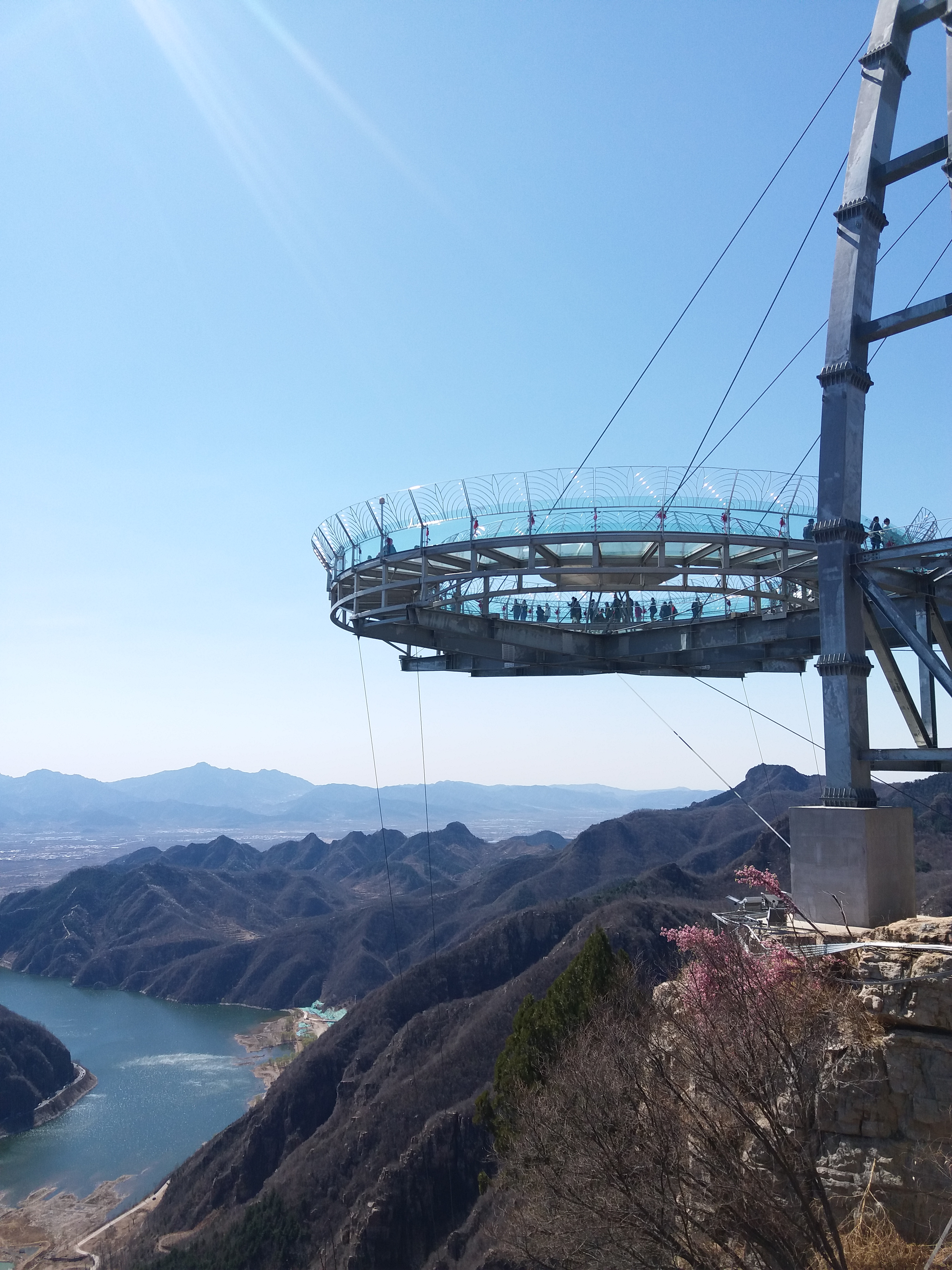
UFO Platform above Shilingxia, 2019

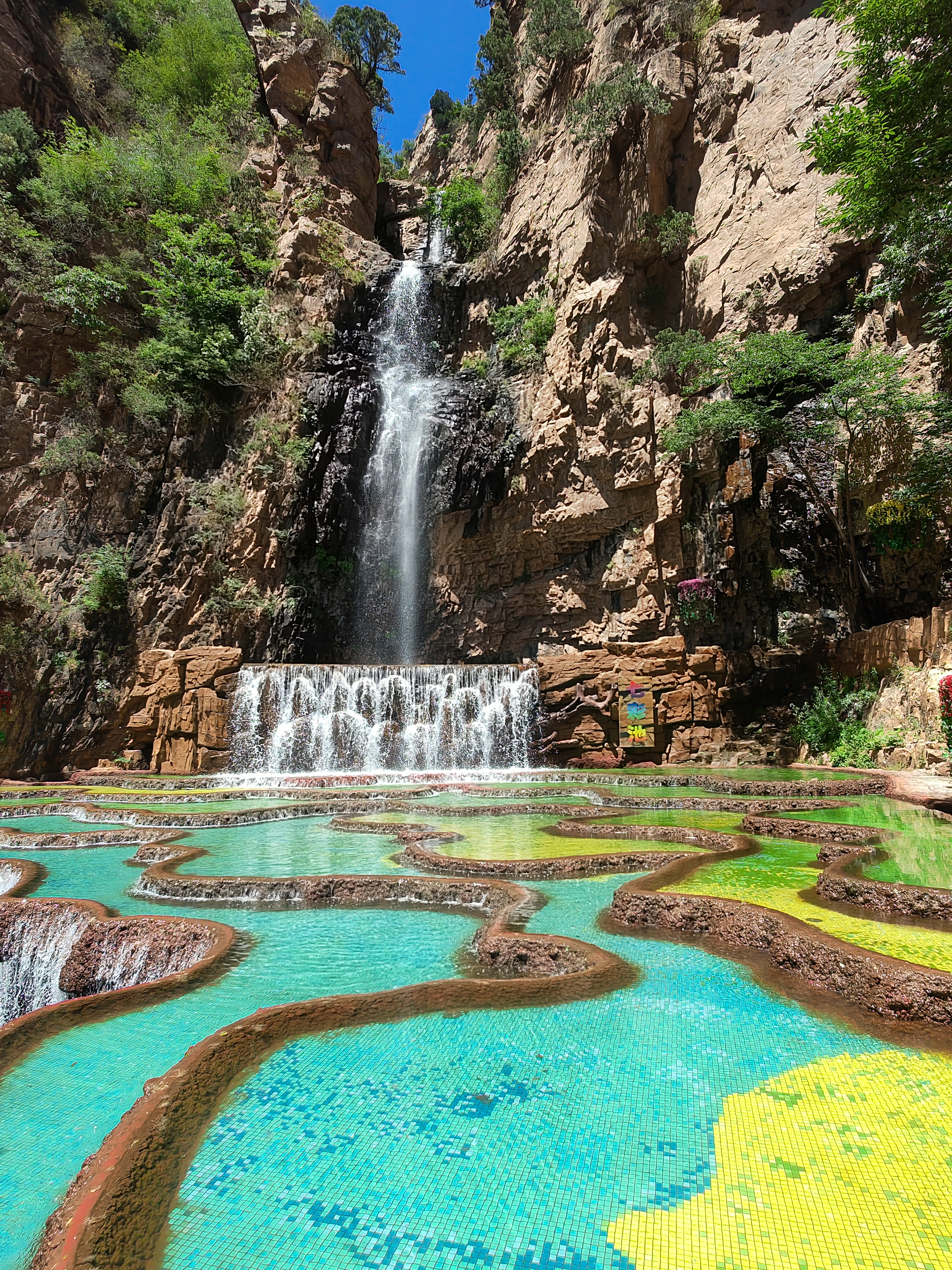
Waterfall at Huangsongyu National Forest Park, 2022

== See also ==
- List of township-level divisions of Beijing
