= Daxingzhuang =

Daxingzhuang Town 大兴庄镇
- Town
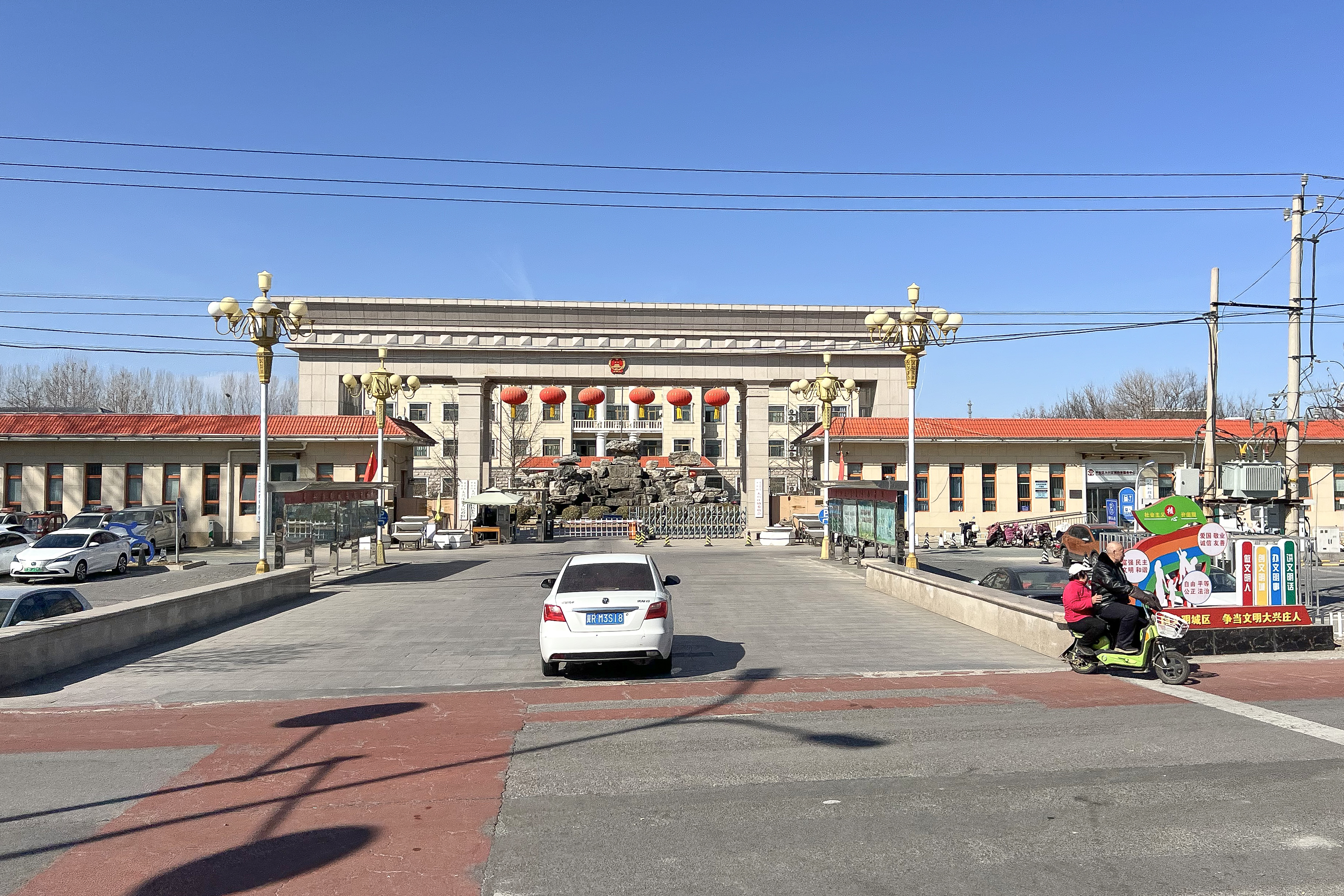
- Government of Daxingzhuang Town

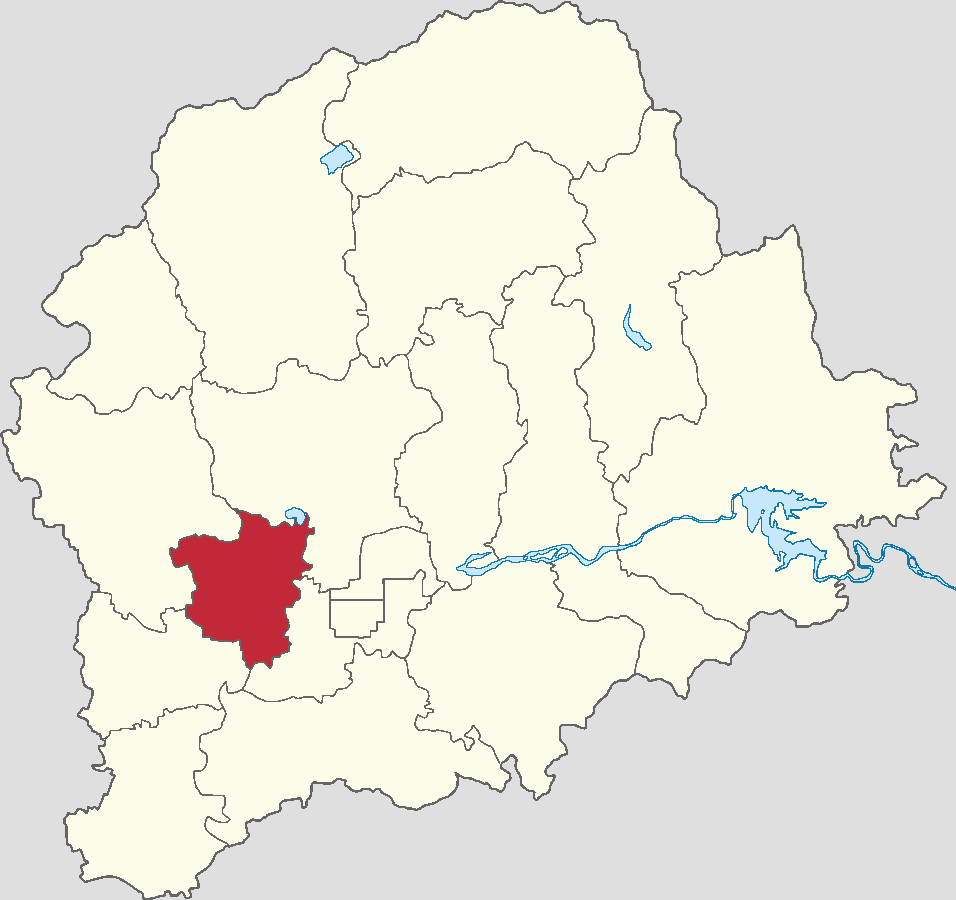
- Location within Pinggu District

- Location within Beijing Location within China
- Coordinates: 40°08′39″N 117°02′09″E
- Country: China
- Municipality: Beijing
- District: Pinggu
- Village-level Divisions: 2 communities 18 villages

Area
  - Total: 24.54 km^{2} (9.47 sq mi)
- Elevation: 32 m (105 ft)

Population (2020)
  - Total: 23,739
  - Density: 967.4/km^{2} (2,505/sq mi)
- Time zone: UTC+8 (China Standard)
- Postal code: 101205
- Area code: 010

Daxingzhuang Town (simplified Chinese: 大兴庄镇; traditional Chinese: 大興莊鎮; pinyin: Dàxīngzhuāng Zhèn) is a town located within Pinggu District, Beijing, China. Situated at the alluvial plain of Ru River, it shares border with Wangxinzhuang Town to the northeast, Pinggu Town to the southeast, Machangying Town to the southwest, and Yukou Town to the northwest. Its population was determined to be 23,739 in the 2020 census.

The name Daxingzhuang was from Daxingzhuang Village. The government of Daxingzhuang Town is now situated near Sanfuzhuang Village.

== History ==
Timeline of Daxingzhuang's History
Year	Status	Within
1958 - 1961	Part of Yukou People's Commune	Pinggu County, Beijing
1961 - 1984	Daxingzhuang People's Commune	Pinggu County, Beijing
1984 - 2000	Daxingzhuang Township	Pinggu County, Beijing
2000 - 2002	Daxibgzhuang Town	Pinggu County, Beijing
2002–present	Daxibgzhuang Town	Pinggu District, Beijing

== Administrative divisions ==
At the end of 2021, Daxingzhuang Town was subdivided 20 divisions, of those 2 were communities and 18 were villages. They can be seen in the following table:

Subdivision names	Name transliterations	Type
如歌家园	Ruge Jiayuan	Community
洳苑嘉园	Ruyuan Jiayuan	Community
大兴庄	Daxingzhuang	Village
鲁各庄	Lugezhuang	Village
白各庄	Baigezhuang	Village
北城子	Beichengzi	Village
东柏店	Dongbaidian	Village
北埝头	Beiniantou	Village
唐庄子	Tangzhuangzi	Village
西柏店	Xibaidian	Village
周庄子	Zhouzhuangzi	Village
韩屯	Hantun	Village
吉卧	Jiwo	Village
良庄子	Liangzhuangzi	Village
三福庄	Sanfuzhuang	Village
陈良屯	Chenliangtun	Village
西石桥	Xishiqiao	Village
东石桥	Dongshiqiao	Village
管家庄	Guanjiazhuang	Village
周村	Zhoucun	Village

== See also ==
- List of township-level divisions of Beijing
