= Wangxinzhuang =

Wangxinzhuang Town 王辛庄镇
- Town
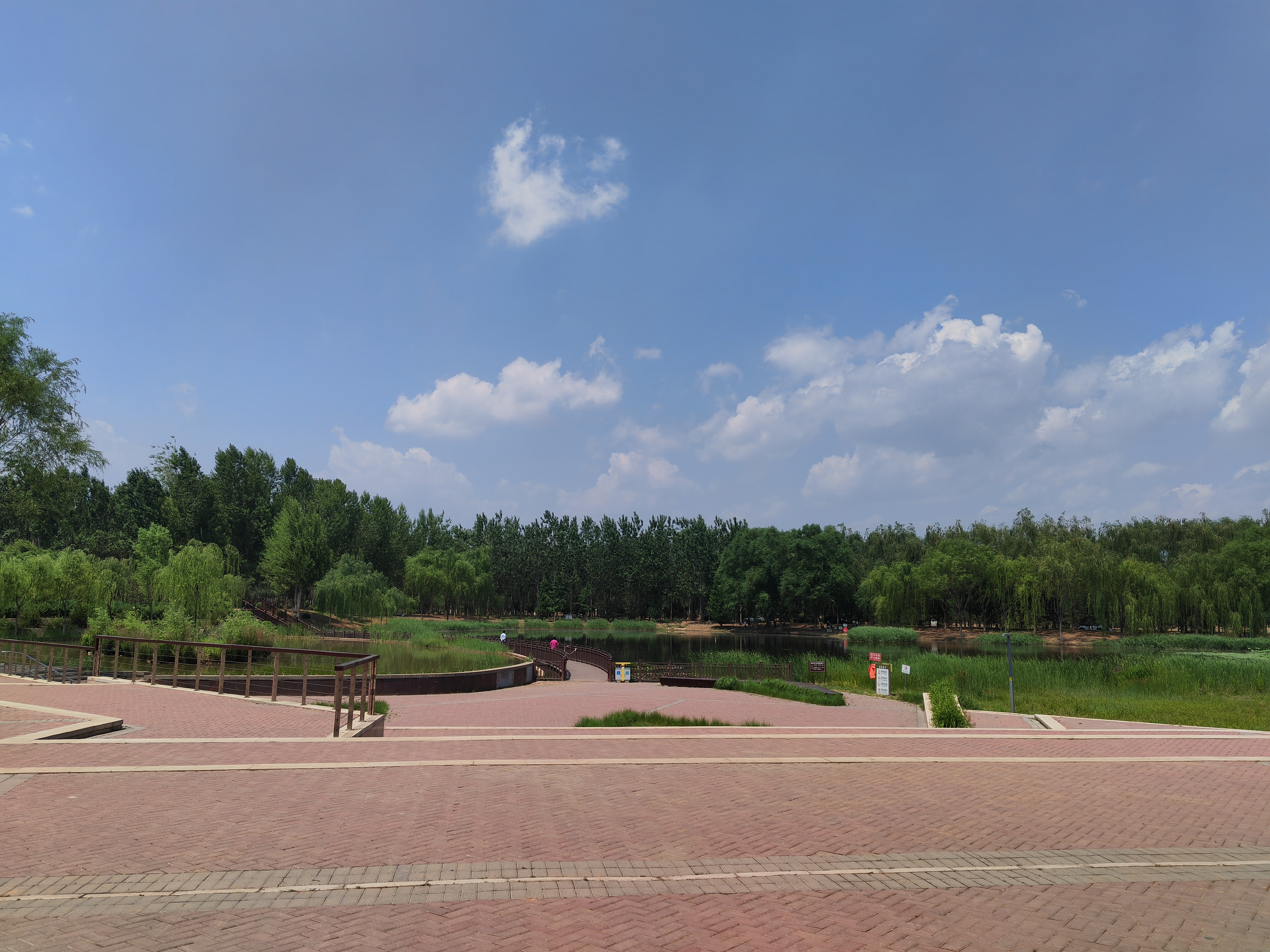
- A park in Qigezhuang Village, 2022

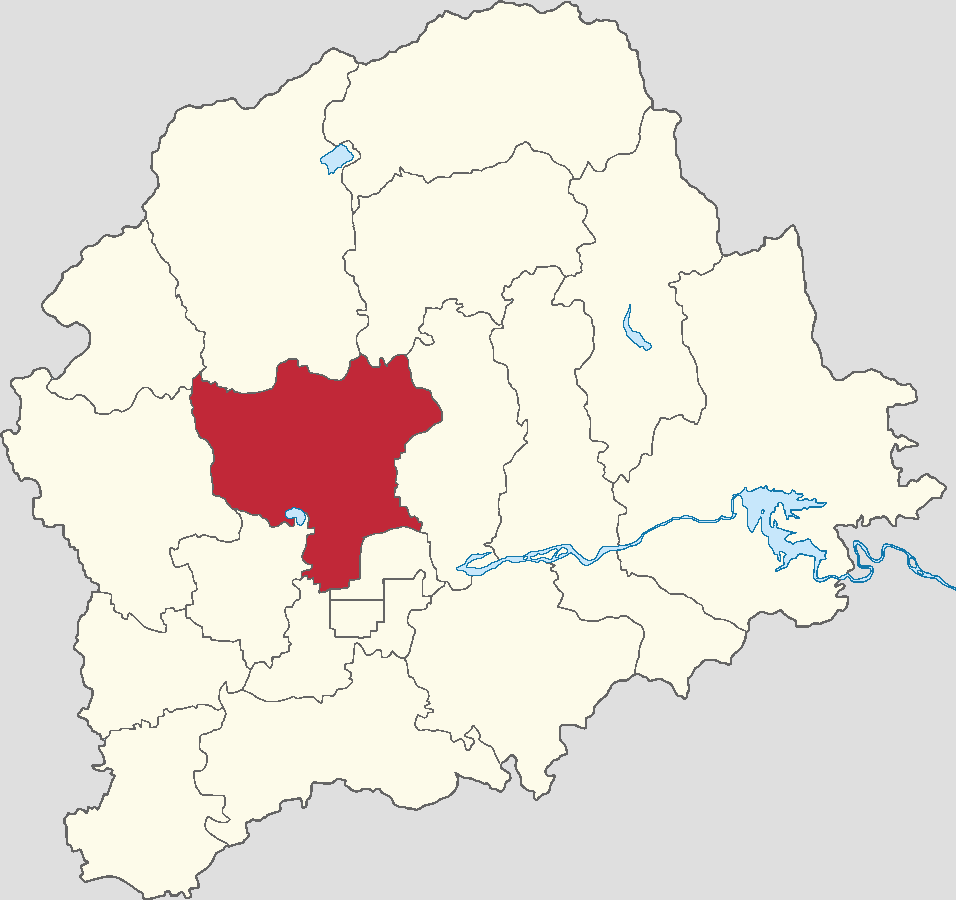
- Location of Wangxinzhuang Town within Pinggu District

- Location within Beijing Location within China
- Coordinates: 40°09′35″N 117°05′50″E
- Country: China
- Municipality: Beijing
- District: Pinggu
- Village-level Divisions: 23 villages

Area
  - Total: 62.58 km^{2} (24.16 sq mi)
- Elevation: 31 m (102 ft)

Population (2020)
  - Total: 30,586
  - Density: 488.8/km^{2} (1,266/sq mi)
- Time zone: UTC+8 (China Standard)
- Postal code: 101209
- Area code: 010

Wangxinzhuang Town (simplified Chinese: 王辛庄镇; traditional Chinese: 王辛莊鎮; pinyin: Wángxīnzhuāng Zhèn) is a town located in the western part of Pinggu District, Beijing, China. It shares borders with Dahuashan Town and Xiong'erzhai Township to the north, Shandongzhuang Town and Xinggu Subdistrict to the east, Pinggu and Daxingzhuang Towns to the south, and Yukou Town to the west. Its population was 30,586 in 2020.

This town name was taken from Wangxinzhuang Village, the place where the town's government is hosted.

== History ==
History of Wangxinzhuang Town
Year	Status	Within
1956 - 1958	Wangxinzhuang Township Yuezhengwu Township	Pinggu County, Hebei
1958 - 1961	(Wangxinzhuang) part of Chengguan People's Commune (Yuezhengwu) part of Yukou People's Commune	Pinggu County, Beijing
1961 - 1984	Wangxinzhuang People's Commune Yuezhengwu People's Commune	Pinggu County, Beijing
1984 - 2000	Wangxinzhuang Township Yuezhengwu Township	Pinggu County, Beijing
2000 - 2002	Wangxinzhuang Town	Pinggu County, Beijing
2002–present	Wangxinzhuang Town	Pinngu District, Beijing

== Administrative divisions ==
So far in 2021, Wangxinzhuang Town is composed of 23 villages, as listed in the table below:

Subdivision names	Name transliterations
太后	Taihou
北上营	Beishangying
中胡家务	Zhong Hujiawu
熊耳营	Xiong'erying
东古村	Dong Gucun
西古村	Xi Gucun
太平庄	Taipingzhuang
大辛寨	Da Xinzhai
小辛寨	Xiao Xinzhai
贾各庄	Jiagezhuang
齐各庄	Qigezhuang
王辛庄	Wangxinzhuang
后罗庄	Houluozhuang
许家务	Xujiawu
莲花潭	Lianhuatan
放光庄	Fangguangzhuang
杨家会	Yangjiahui
井儿峪	Jing'eryu
北辛庄	Beixinzhuang
翟各庄	Zhaigezhuang
西杏园	Xi Xingyuan
东杏园	Dong Xingyuan
乐政务	Yuezhengwu

== See also ==
- List of township-level divisions of Beijing
