= Binhe Subdistrict, Beijing =

Binhe Subdistrict 滨河街道
- Subdistrict
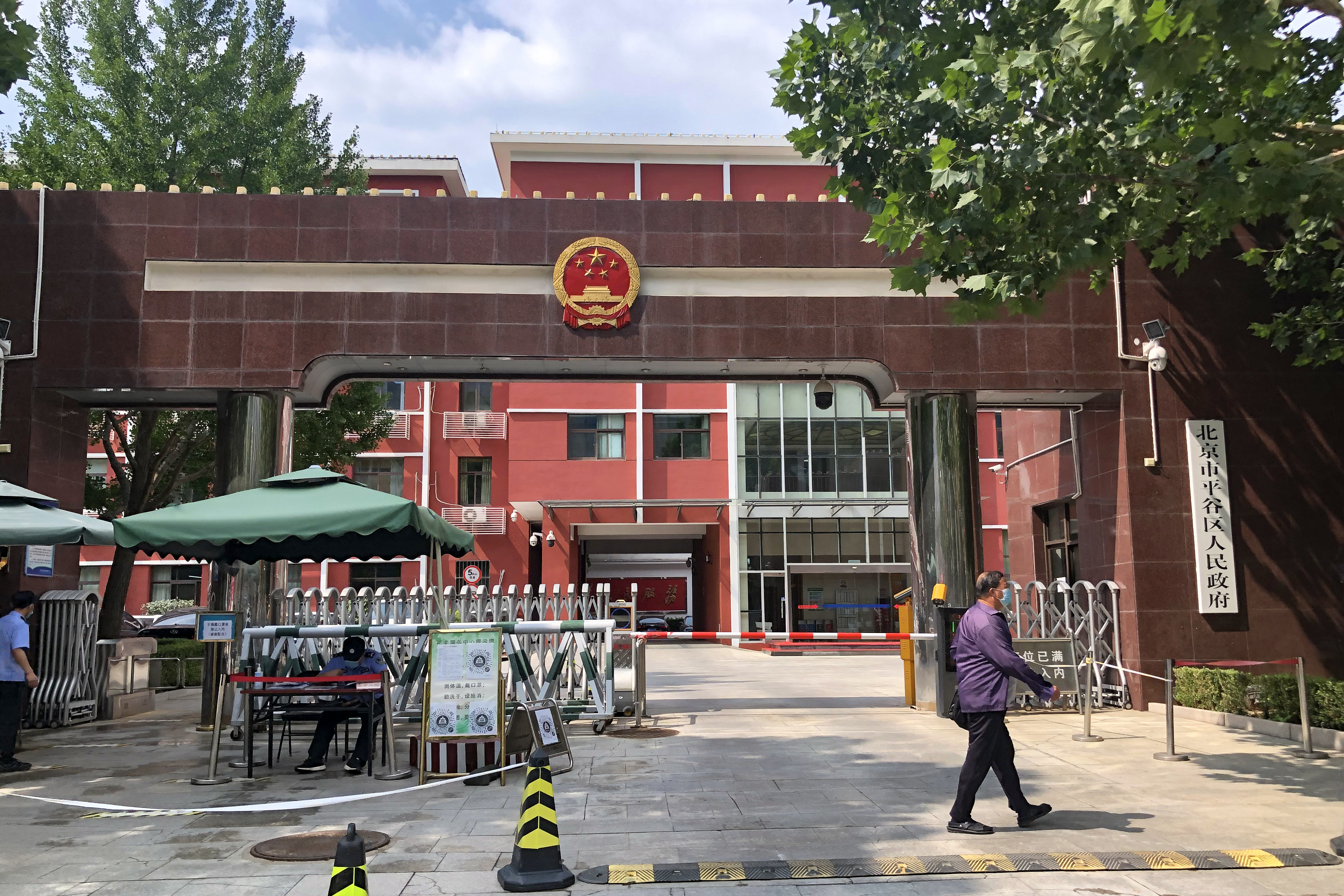
- Government of Pinggu District within the subdistrict, 2020

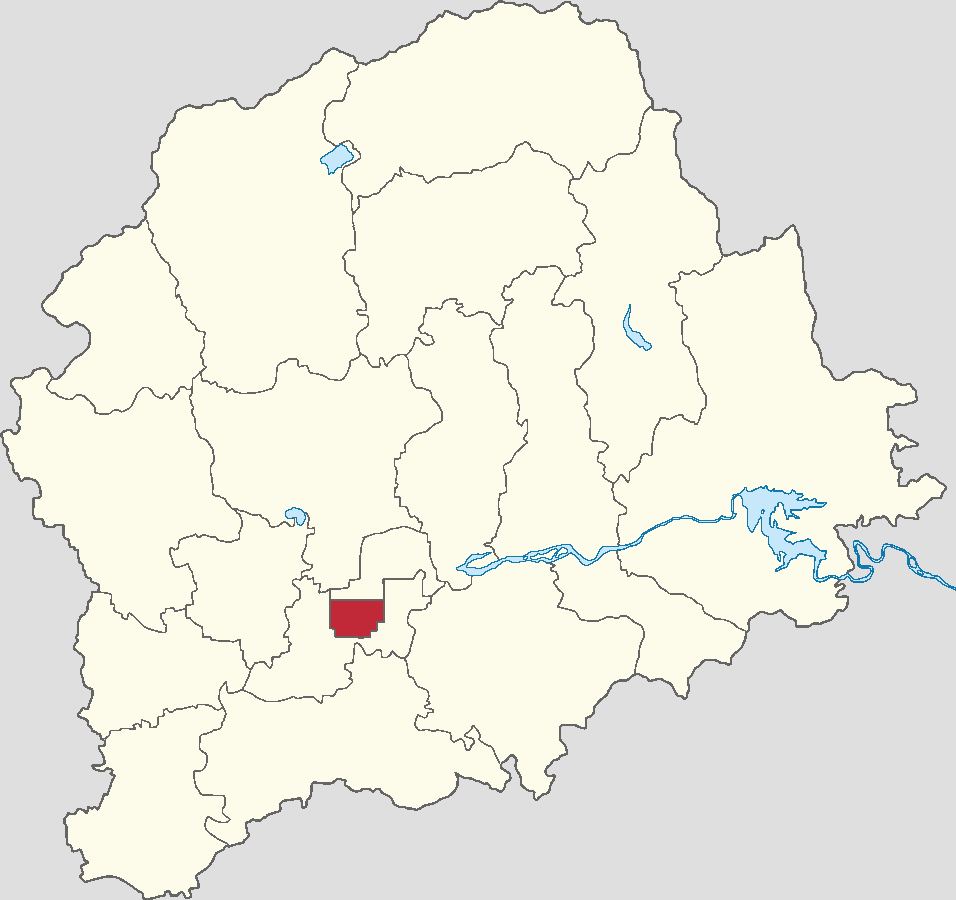
- Location of Binhe Subdistrict in Pinggu District

- Location within Beijing Location within China
- Coordinates: 40°08′01″N 117°06′31″E
- Country: China
- Municipality: Beijing
- District: Pinggu
- Village-level Divisions: 15 communities

Area
  - Total: 3.29 km^{2} (1.27 sq mi)
- Elevation: 31 m (102 ft)

Population (2020)
  - Total: 50,541
  - Density: 15,400/km^{2} (39,800/sq mi)
- Time zone: UTC+8 (China Standard)
- Postal code: 101213
- Area code: 010

Binhe Subdistrict (simplified Chinese: 滨河街道; traditional Chinese: 濱河街道; pinyin: Bīnhé Jiēdào) is a subdistrict in the southern side of Pinggu District, Beijing, China. It borders Xinggu Subdistrict in its north, and is surrounded by Pinggu Town in all other directions. As of 2020, its population was 50,541. This subdistrict was formed in 2002, and its name can be translated as "Shore River".

== Administrative divisions ==
In the year 2021, Binhe Subdistrict comprised 15 residential communities. They are listed as follows:

Subdivision names	Name transliterations
金谷东园	Jingu Dongyuan
平粮	Pingliang
向阳	Xiangyang
金谷园	Jinguyuan
承平园	Chengpingyuan
北小区	Beixiaoqu
建西	Jianxi
南小区	Nanxiaoqu
滨河	Binhe
金海	Jinhai
建南	Jiannan
府前	Fuqian
林荫家园	Linyin Jiayuan
绿谷新苑	Lügu Xinyuan
泃河湾	Juhewan

== See also ==
- List of township-level divisions of Beijing
