= Pinggu, Beijing =

Pinggu 平谷区 Pingku
- District
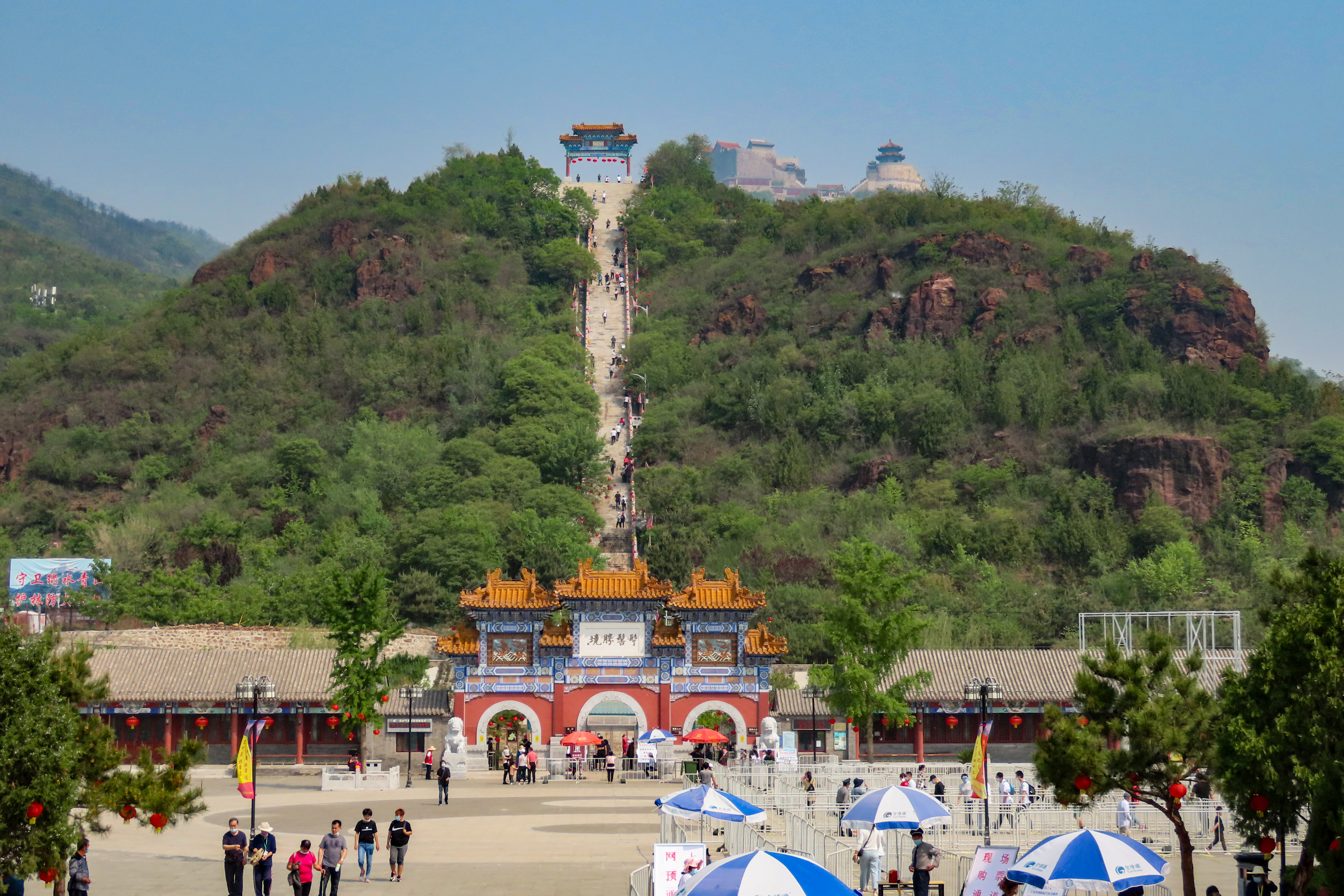
- Yaji Mountain

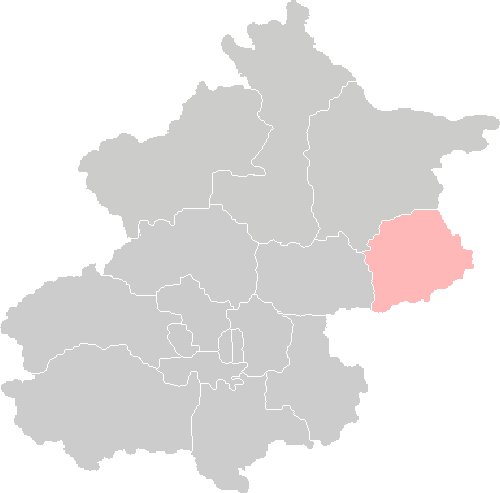
- Pinggu District in Beijing
- Coordinates: 40°8′32″N 117°6′4″E
- Country: People's Republic of China
- Municipality: Beijing
- Township-level divisions: 2 subdistricts 15 towns 1 township

Area
  - Total: 950 km^{2} (370 sq mi)

Population (2020)
  - Total: 457,313
  - Density: 480/km^{2} (1,200/sq mi)
- Time zone: UTC+8 (China Standard)
- Postal code: 101200
- Area code: 0010
- Website: bjpg.gov.cn

Pinggu District (Chinese: 平谷区; pinyin: Pínggǔ Qū), formerly Pinggu County (平谷县), lies in the far east of Beijing Municipality. It has an area of 950 km^{2} (370 sq mi) and a population of 457,313 (2020 Census). The district is subdivided into 2 subdistricts, 14 towns, and 2 townships. It borders the Beijing districts of Miyun and Shunyi to the north and west, respectively, Tianjin's Jizhou District to the southeast, and in Hebei province, Xinglong County and Sanhe to the northeast and south, respectively.

== Administrative divisions ==
There are 2 subdistricts, 14 towns, and 2 townships in the district:

Name	Chinese (S)	Hanyu Pinyin	Population (2010)	Area (km^{2})
Xinggu Subdistrict	兴谷街道	Xìnggǔ Jiēdào	53,000	15.00
Binhe Subdistrict	滨河街道	Bīnhé Jiēdào	44,897	3.36
Pinggu town	平谷镇	Pínggǔ Zhèn	56,015	27.50
Yukou town	峪口镇	Yùkǒu Zhèn	26,493	64.10
Mafang town	马坊镇	Mǎfāng Zhèn	17,949	44.00
Jinhaihu town	金海湖(镇)地区	Jīnhǎihú Zhèn	26,835	128.53
Donggaocun town	东高村镇	Dōnggāocūn Zhèn	27,945	57.00
Shandongzhuang town	山东庄镇	Shāndōngzhuāng Zhèn	16,439	50.00
Nandulehe town	南独乐河镇	Nándúlèhé Zhèn	20,449	69.00
Dahuashan town	大华山镇	Dàhuàshān Zhèn	16,396	96.64
Xiagezhuang town	夏各庄镇	Xiàgèzhuāng Zhèn	20,958	59.60
Machangying town	马昌营镇	Mǎchāngyíng Zhèn	16,303	28.80
Wangxinzhuang town	王辛庄镇	Wángxīnzhuāng Zhèn	29,686	96.00
Daxingzhuang town	大兴庄镇	Dàxīngzhuāng Zhèn	17,297	33.00
Liujiadian town	刘家店镇	Liújiādiàn Zhèn	7,509	35.60
Zhenluoying town	镇罗营镇	Zhènluōyíng Zhèn	8,875	80.90
Xiong'erzhai Township	熊儿寨乡	Xióng'erzhài Xiāng	5,498	59.20
Huangsongyu Township	黄松峪乡	Huángsōngyù Xiāng	3,414	64.40

== Climate ==
Pinggu District has a humid continental climate (Köppen climate classification Dwa). The average annual temperature in Pinggu is 12.0 °C (53.6 °F). The average annual rainfall is 603.2 mm (23.75 in) with July as the wettest month. The temperatures are highest on average in July, at around 26.5 °C (79.7 °F), and lowest in January, at around −4.9 °C (23.2 °F).

Climate data for Pinggu District, elevation 32 m (105 ft), (1991–2020 normals, extremes 1959–present)
Month	Jan	Feb	Mar	Apr	May	Jun	Jul	Aug	Sep	Oct	Nov	Dec	Year
Record high °C (°F)	13.8 (56.8)	24.3 (75.7)	28.7 (83.7)	33.7 (92.7)	36.9 (98.4)	39.3 (102.7)	41.3 (106.3)	37.3 (99.1)	36.8 (98.2)	30.7 (87.3)	22.3 (72.1)	14.5 (58.1)	41.3 (106.3)
Mean daily maximum °C (°F)	2.0 (35.6)	5.9 (42.6)	12.8 (55.0)	20.7 (69.3)	26.9 (80.4)	30.5 (86.9)	31.5 (88.7)	30.4 (86.7)	26.2 (79.2)	19.2 (66.6)	10.1 (50.2)	3.2 (37.8)	18.3 (64.9)
Daily mean °C (°F)	−4.9 (23.2)	−1.2 (29.8)	6.1 (43.0)	14.3 (57.7)	20.4 (68.7)	24.6 (76.3)	26.5 (79.7)	25.2 (77.4)	19.8 (67.6)	12.3 (54.1)	3.5 (38.3)	−3.2 (26.2)	12.0 (53.5)
Mean daily minimum °C (°F)	−10.3 (13.5)	−7.1 (19.2)	−0.1 (31.8)	7.5 (45.5)	13.5 (56.3)	18.8 (65.8)	22.0 (71.6)	20.7 (69.3)	14.5 (58.1)	6.5 (43.7)	−1.7 (28.9)	−8.1 (17.4)	6.4 (43.4)
Record low °C (°F)	−22.2 (−8.0)	−26.6 (−15.9)	−17.2 (1.0)	−5.5 (22.1)	0.2 (32.4)	7.7 (45.9)	13.9 (57.0)	8.0 (46.4)	3.0 (37.4)	−5.0 (23.0)	−14.9 (5.2)	−22.3 (−8.1)	−26.6 (−15.9)
Average precipitation mm (inches)	2.1 (0.08)	4.5 (0.18)	7.9 (0.31)	23.0 (0.91)	42.8 (1.69)	92.8 (3.65)	194.6 (7.66)	128.5 (5.06)	59.4 (2.34)	29.8 (1.17)	15.0 (0.59)	2.8 (0.11)	603.2 (23.75)
Average precipitation days (≥ 0.1 mm)	1.4	1.9	2.7	4.5	6.4	10.1	13.1	10.2	7.1	4.9	3.2	1.8	67.3
Average snowy days	3.0	2.6	1.2	0.1	0	0	0	0	0	0	1.7	2.9	11.5
Average relative humidity (%)	49	46	45	46	53	62	74	77	73	67	61	54	59
Mean monthly sunshine hours	183.2	182.5	224.4	235.2	260.6	220.9	183.8	205.0	207.2	194.9	168.4	174.7	2,440.8
Percentage possible sunshine	61	60	60	59	58	49	41	49	56	57	57	61	56
Source: China Meteorological Administration

== History ==
Pinggu District was formerly Pinggu County until 2001. The 10,000-capacity Pinggu Stadium was opened in 1986.

== Economy ==
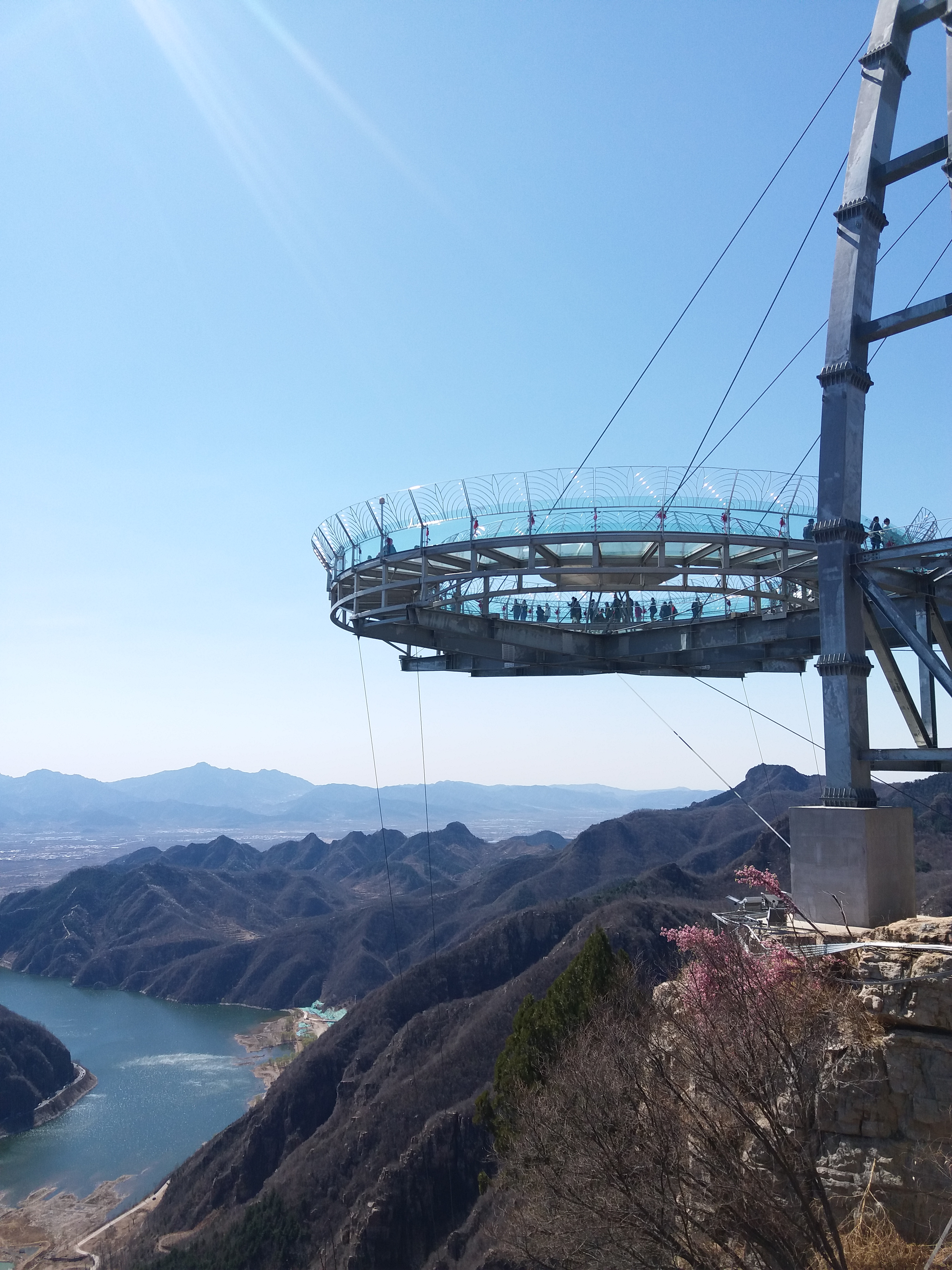
UFO Glass Platform

Pinggu district prides itself on the cultivation of the peach.

In 2009, it represented a growing area of over 6,000 hectares and an annual output of 270 million kilograms of more than 200 varieties of peaches in four major categories. Providing employment for over 150,000 people, Pinggu peaches are also an important source of economic growth for the people in the region. Peaches originated in China and have been cultivated there for thousands of years. The peach tree has special significance in Chinese culture, with it being considered to be the “tree of life,” and peaches are recognized as symbols of immortality and unity. What sets Pinggu peaches apart from those cultivated in other regions are their beautiful colors, high sugar content, unique flavor and large size. These characteristics are a direct result of the unique geographical properties of Pinggu. With mountains on three sides and plains at its center, Pinggu’s fresh air, low pollution, sandy soil, plentiful water supply and the marked difference between day and night temperatures make for ideal peach growing conditions. By 2005 orchard owners were exporting them to over twenty provinces in China as well as foreign markets such as Brunei, the European Union, Russia, Singapore and Thailand.

To register a Geographical Indication for Pinggu peaches, orchard owners and the Pinggu government formed the Pinggu County Production and Distribution Service Center of Agricultural Products (PDSCAP). This alliance resulted in the Pinggu peach being the first agricultural product to have its GI registered in China in 2002.

== Transportation ==
Line 22 of Beijing Subway: Mafang Logistics Hub station, Machangying station, Guononggang station, Pinggu station

== Sister cities ==
- Dongjak-gu, Seoul, South Korea (1995)
- Llíria, Valencia, Spain (2018)
