= Liujiadian =

Liujiadian Town 刘家店镇
- Town
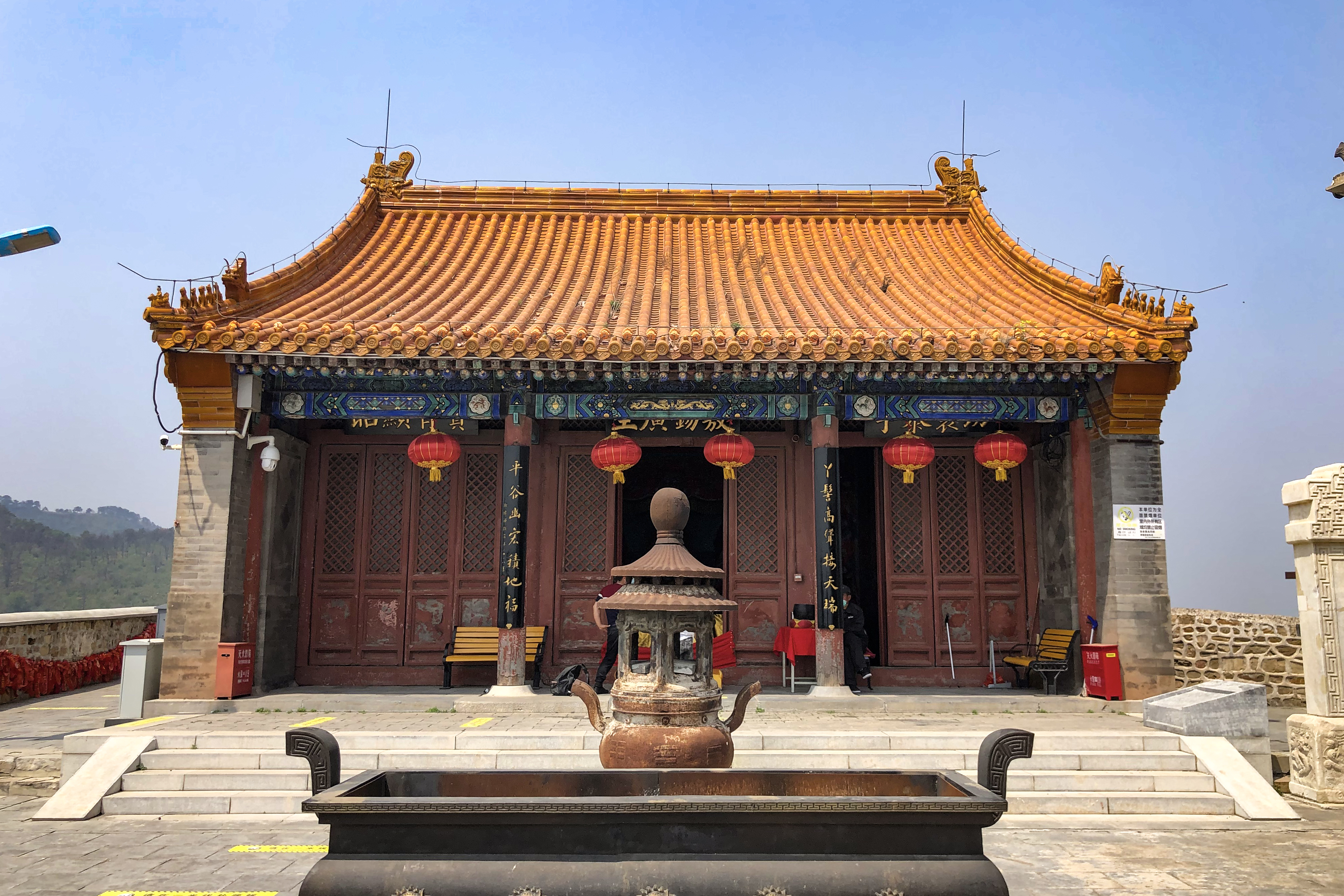
- Temple of the Goddess Bixia Yuanjun at Yaji Mountain, 2020

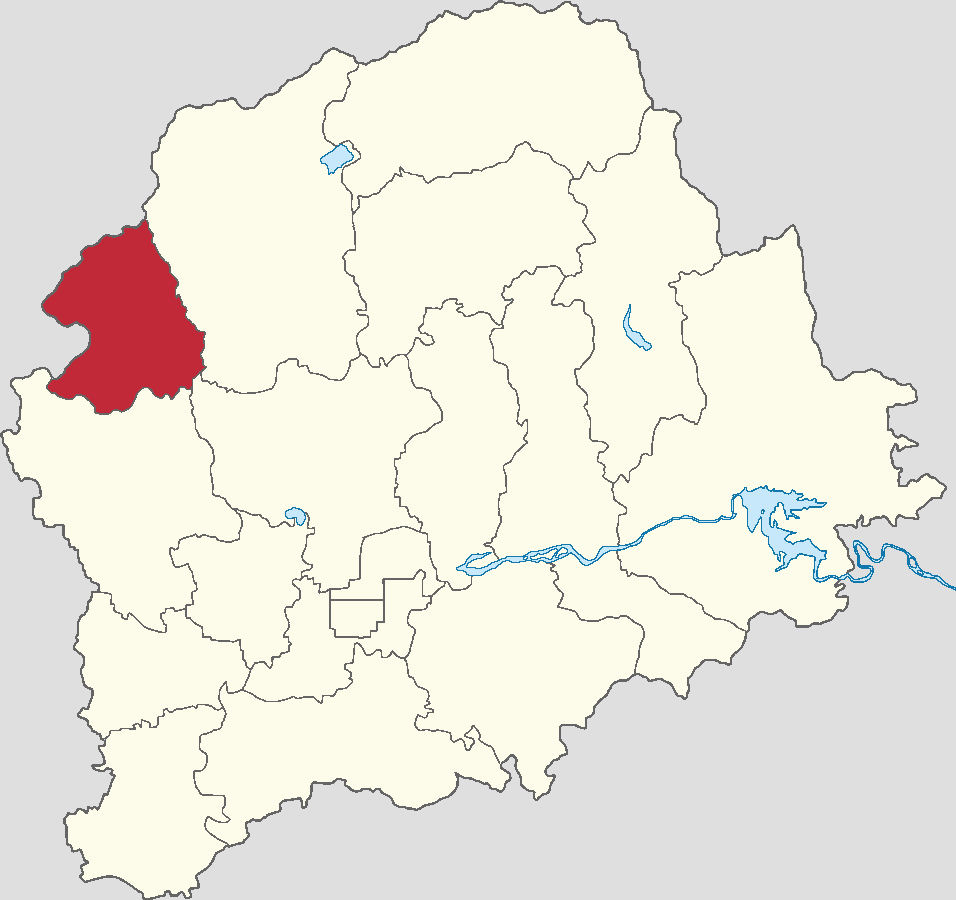
- Location in Pinggu District

- Location within Beijing Location within China
- Coordinates: 40°14′21″N 117°00′55″E
- Country: China
- Municipality: Beijing
- District: Pinggu
- Village-level Divisions: 14 villages

Area
  - Total: 35.71 km^{2} (13.79 sq mi)
- Elevation: 73 m (240 ft)

Population (2020)
  - Total: 7,155
  - Density: 200.4/km^{2} (518.9/sq mi)
- Time zone: UTC+8 (China Standard)
- Postal code: 101206
- Area code: 010

Liujiadian Town (simplified Chinese: 刘家店镇; traditional Chinese: 劉家店鎮; pinyin: Liújiādiàn Zhèn) is a town located inside of Pinggu District, Beijing, China. It borders Dahuashan Town to the northeast, Wangxinzhuang and Yukou Towns to the south, and Dongshaoqu Town to the west. Its total population was 7,155 in the 2020 census.

The name Liujiadian (Chinese: 刘家店; lit. 'Liu Family's Shop') comes from Liujiadian Village, the seat of government for this town.

== History ==
History of Liujiadian Town
Year	Status	Belonged to
1946 - 1953		Pinggu County, Hebei
1953 - 1956	Yindong Township Wanjiazhuang Township Bei Jishan Township	Pinggu County, Hebei
1956 - 1958	Liujiadian Township	Pinggu County, Hebei
1958 - 1961	Liujiadian Management Area, part of Dahuashan People's Commune	Pinggu County, Beijing
1961 - 1984	Liujiadian People's Commune	Pinggu County, Beijing
1984 - 2001	Liujiadian Township	Pinggu County, Beijing
2001 - 2002	Liujiadian Town	Pinggu County, Beijing
2002–present	Liujiadian Town	Pinggu District, Beijing

== Administrative divisions ==
As of 2021, 14 villages constituted Liujiadian Town. They can be seen in the following table:

Subdivision names	Name transliterations
凤落滩	Fengluotan
北店	Beidian
北吉山	Bei Jishan
前吉山	Qian Jishan
松棚	Songpeng
刘家店	Liujiadian
孔城峪	Kongchengyu
万家庄	Changjiazhuang
胡家店	Hujiadian
寅洞	Yindong
辛庄子	Xinzhuangzi
江米洞	Jiangmidong
行宫	Xinggong
东山下	Dongshanxia

== Gallery ==
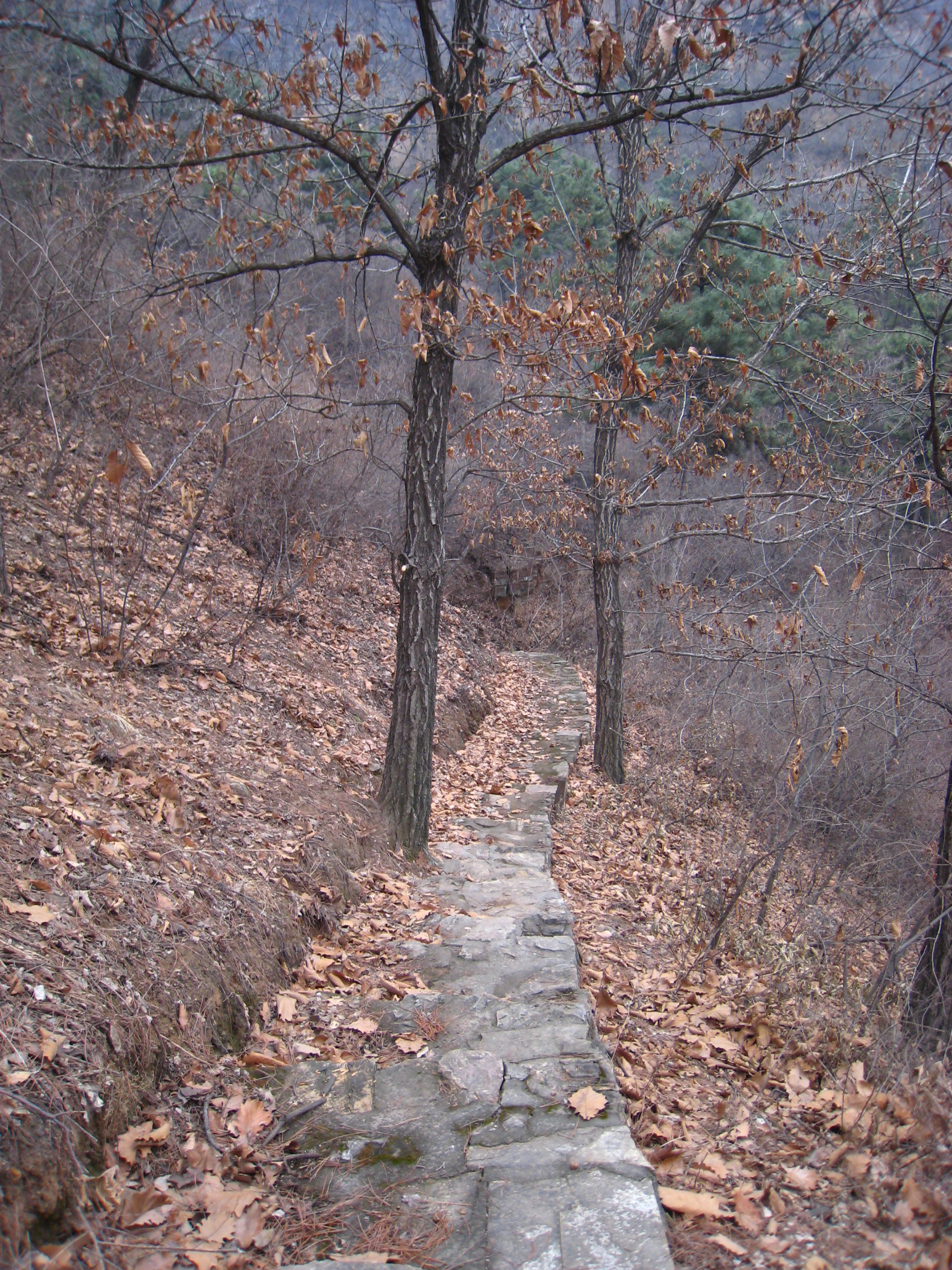
Trails on Yaji Mountain, 2009

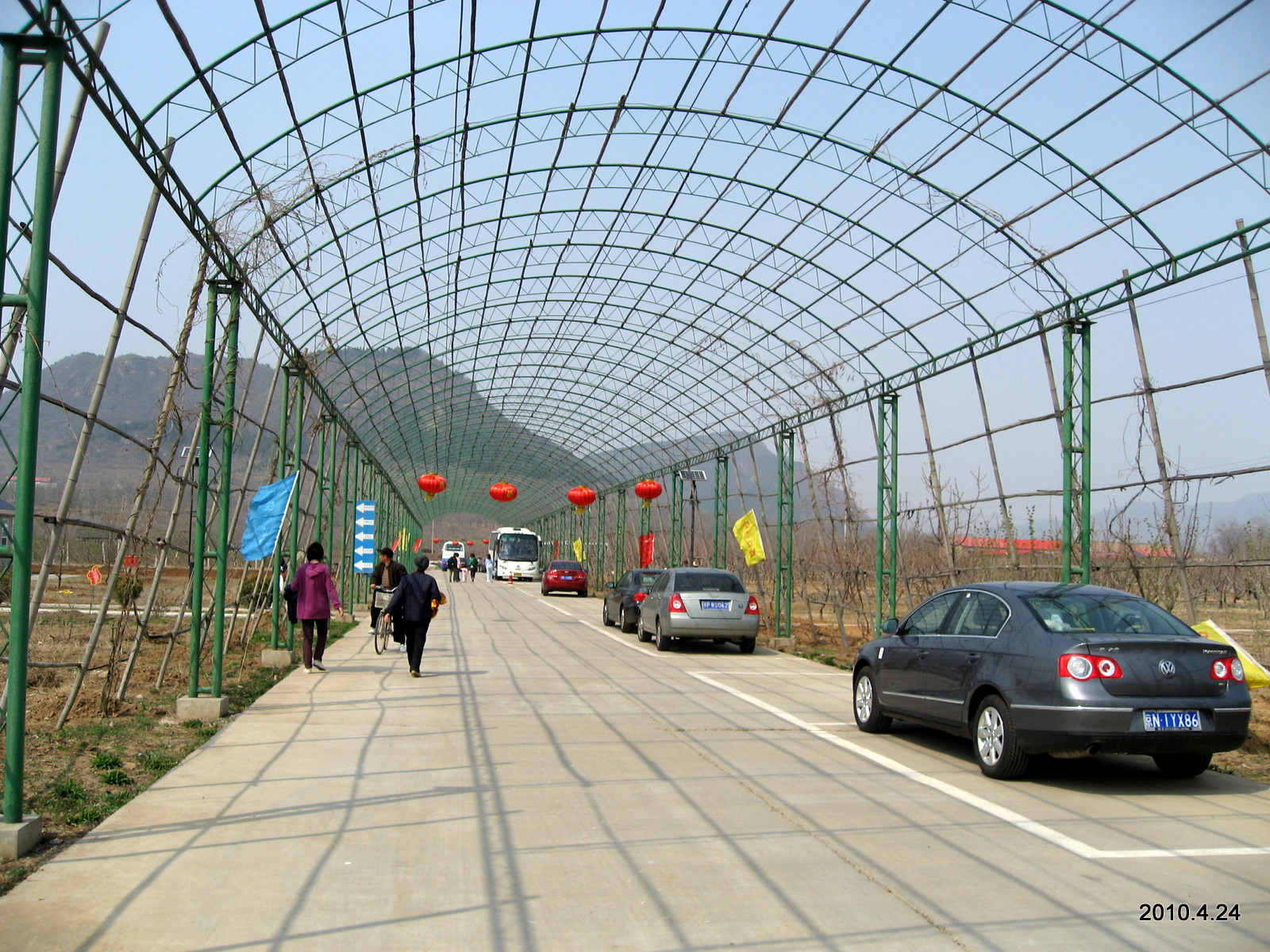
Conghai Yiyuan Picking Orchard, 2010

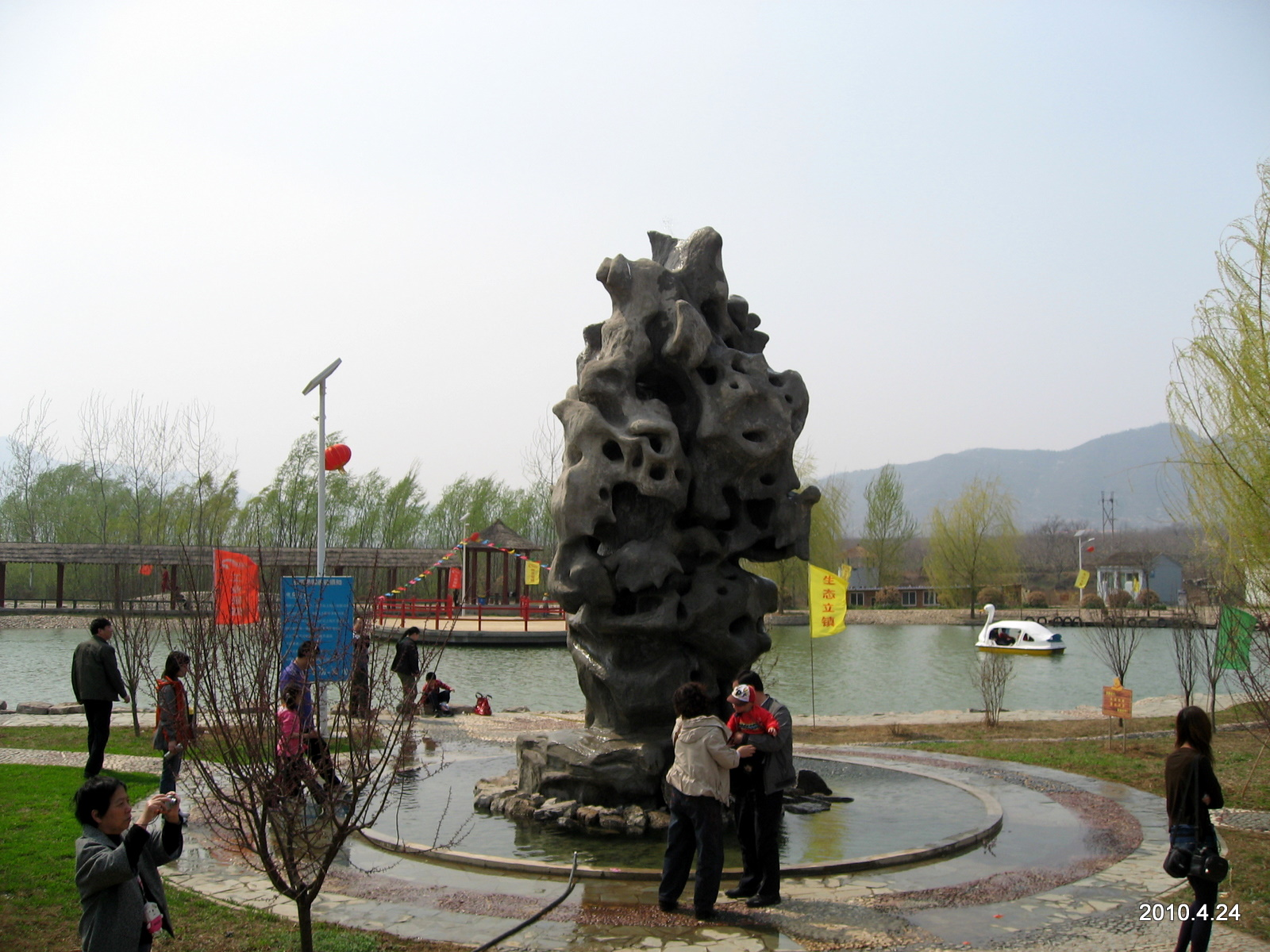
Taohuayuan Ecology Town, 2010

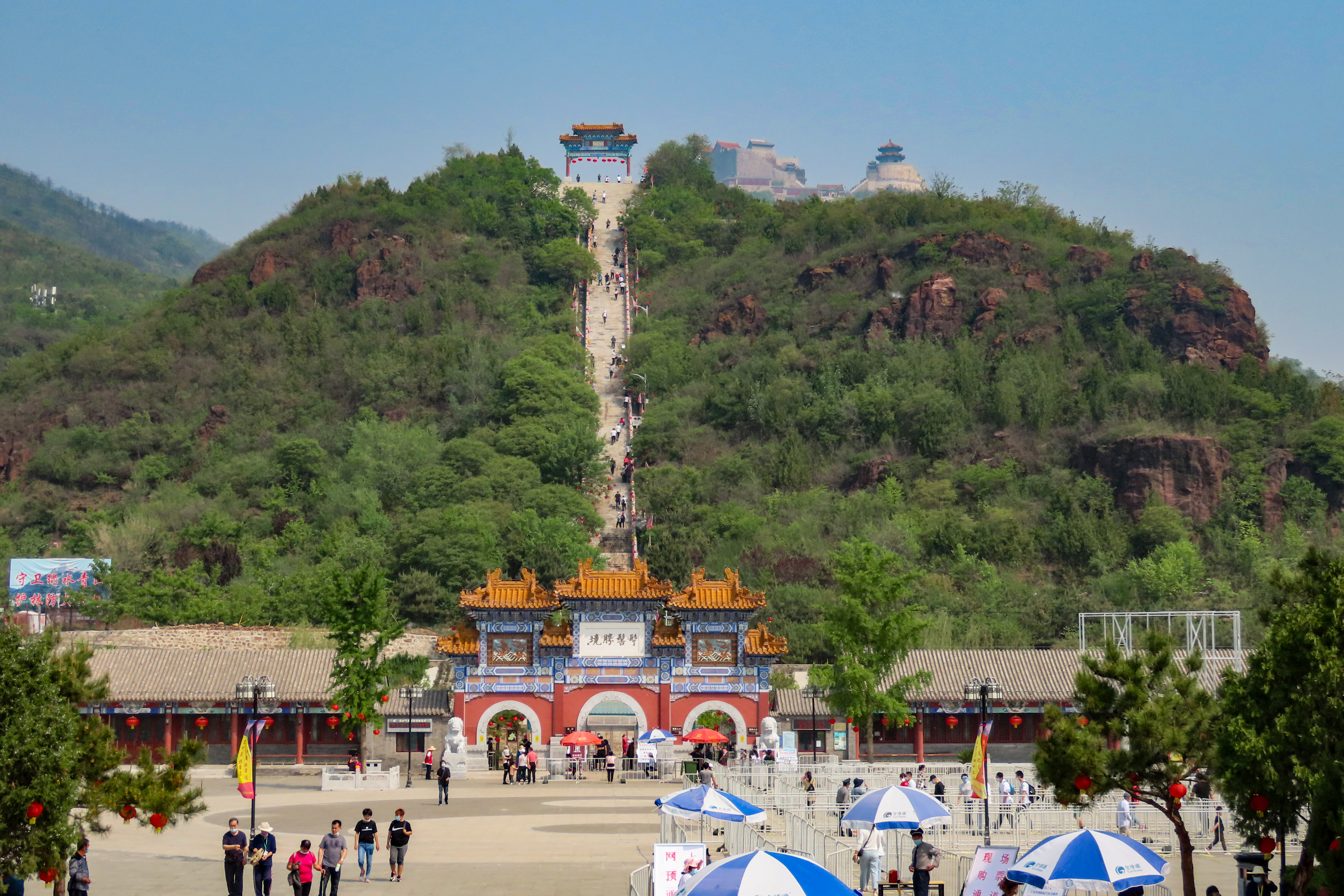
Entrance of Yaji Mountain, 2020

== See also ==
- List of township-level divisions of Beijing
