= Zhenluoying =

Zhenluoying Town 镇罗营镇
- Town
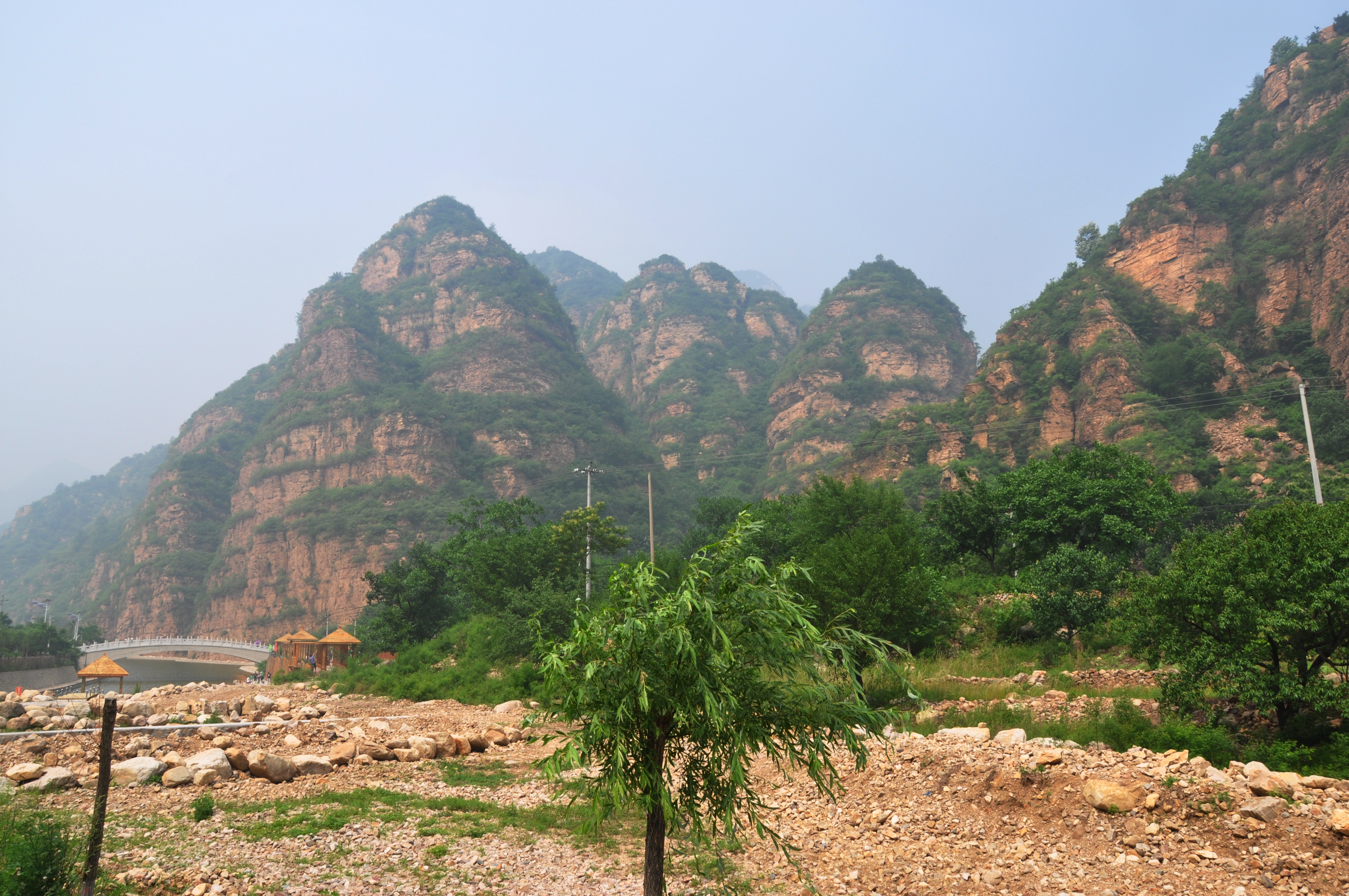
- Scenery near Bolitai Village, 2010

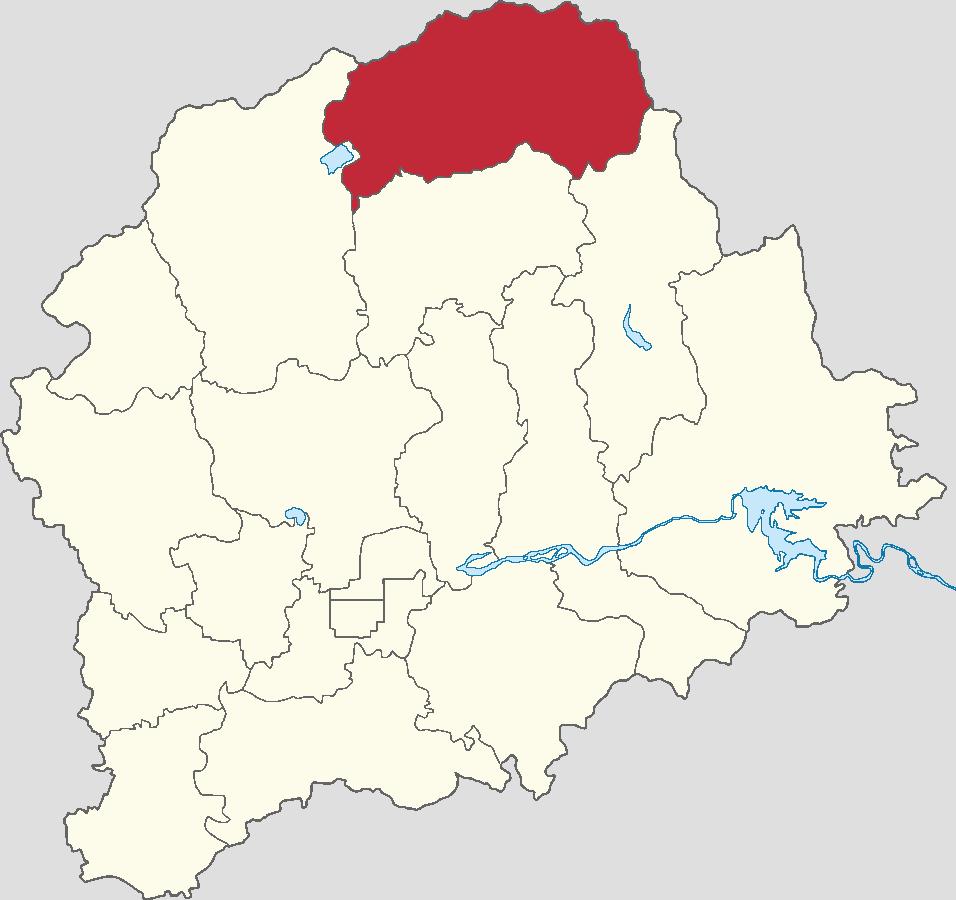
- Location within Pinggu District

- Location within Beijing Location within China
- Coordinates: 40°20′37″N 117°08′35″E
- Country: China
- Municipality: Beijing
- District: Pinggu
- Village-level Divisions: 20 villages

Area
  - Total: 80.21 km^{2} (30.97 sq mi)
- Elevation: 301 m (988 ft)

Population (2020)
  - Total: 7,610
  - Density: 94.9/km^{2} (246/sq mi)
- Time zone: UTC+8 (China Standard)
- Postal code: 101215
- Area code: 010

Zhenluoying Town (simplified Chinese: 镇罗营镇; traditional Chinese: 鎮羅營鎮; pinyin: Zhènluōyíng Zhèn) is a town situated on the northern end of Pinggu District, Beijing, China. It is surrounded by mountains on all sides except the west. The town lies to the south of Dachengzi Town, west of Erdaohezi Town, north of Huangsongyu and Xiong'erzhai Townships, and east of Dahuashan Town. As of 2020, it had 7,610 people residing within its borders.

The origin of its name can be traced back to 1544, when Ming dynasty defeated and captured a group of Doyan raiders from Northern Yuan. The captured Mongols were kept in a garrison in this region, which was named Zhenluying (Chinese: 镇虏营; lit. 'Subdue Captive Barrack'). The name later evolved into Zhenluoying of today during the Qing dynasty.

== History ==
Timetable of Zhenluoying Town
Year	Status	Part of
1950 - 1953	4th District	Pinggu County, Hebei
1953 - 1956	6th District	Pinggu County, Hebei
1956 - 1958	Zhenluoying Township Guanshang Township	Pinggu County, Hebei
1958 - 1961	Zhenluoying Management Area, within Dahuashan People's Commune	Pinggu County, Beijing
1961 - 1984	Zhenluoying People's Commune	Pinggu County, Beijing
1984 - 2001	Zhenluoying Township	Pinggu County, Beijing
2001 - 2002	Zhenluoying Town	Pinggu County, Beijing
2002–present	Zhenluoying Town	Pinggu District, Beijing

== Administrative divisions ==
So far in 2021, Zhenluoying Town consists of 20 villages, all of which are listed in the table below:

Subdivision names	Name transliterations
上镇	Shangzhen
大庙峪	Damiaoyu
季家沟	Jijiagou
北四道岭	Bei Sidaoling
东四道岭	Dong Sidaoling
下营	Xiaying
上营	Shangying
桃园	Taoyuan
见子庄	Jianzizhuang
东牛角峪	Dong Niujiaoyu
五里庙	Wulimiao
西寺峪	Xi Siyu
东寺峪	Dong Siyu
核桃洼	Hetaowa
关上	Guanshang
北水峪	Beishuiyu
清水湖	Qingshuihu
杨家台	Yangjiatai
张家台	Zhangjiatai
玻璃台	Bolitai

== See also ==
- List of township-level divisions of Beijing
