= Machangying =

Machangying Town 马昌营镇
- Town
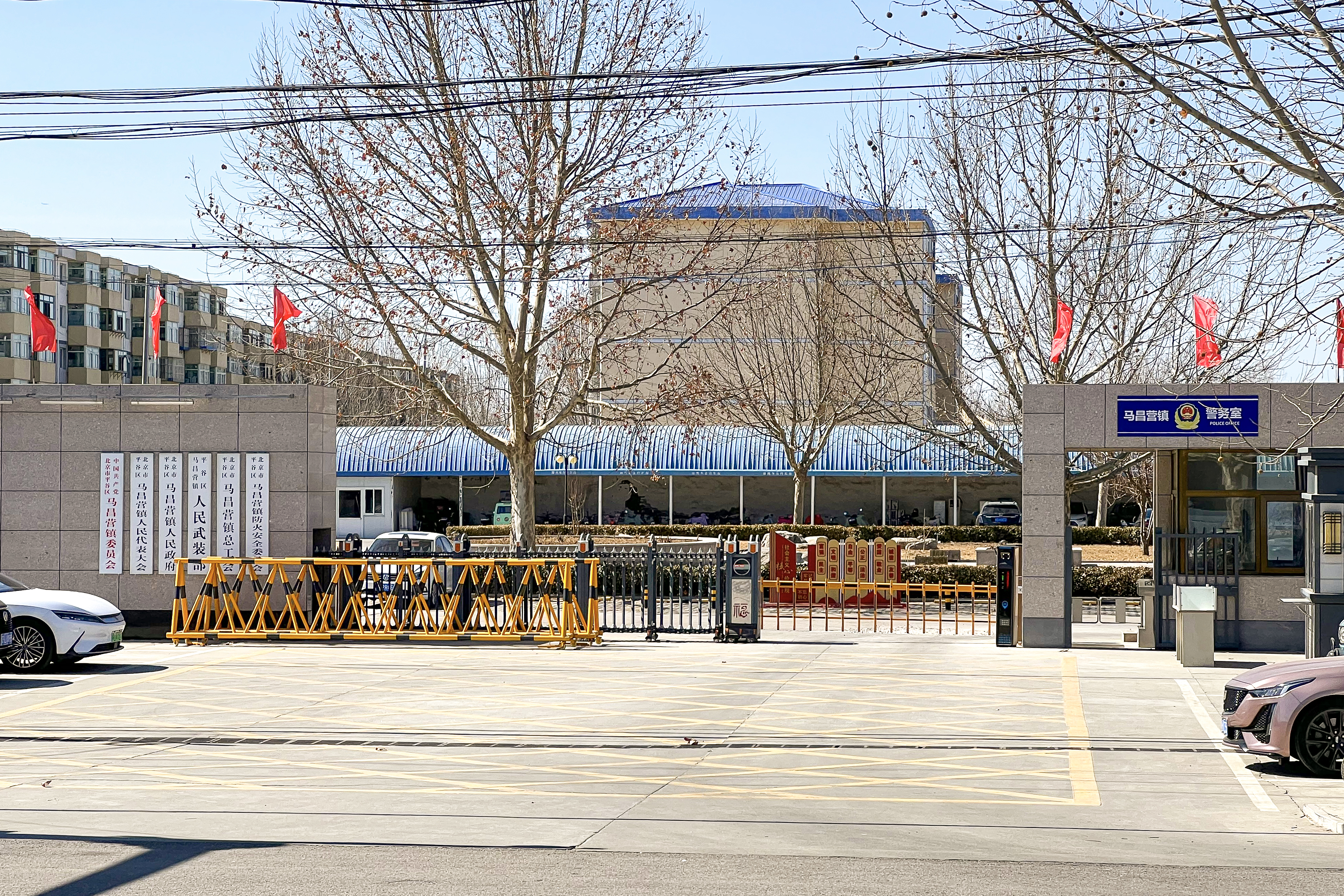
- Government of Machangying Town

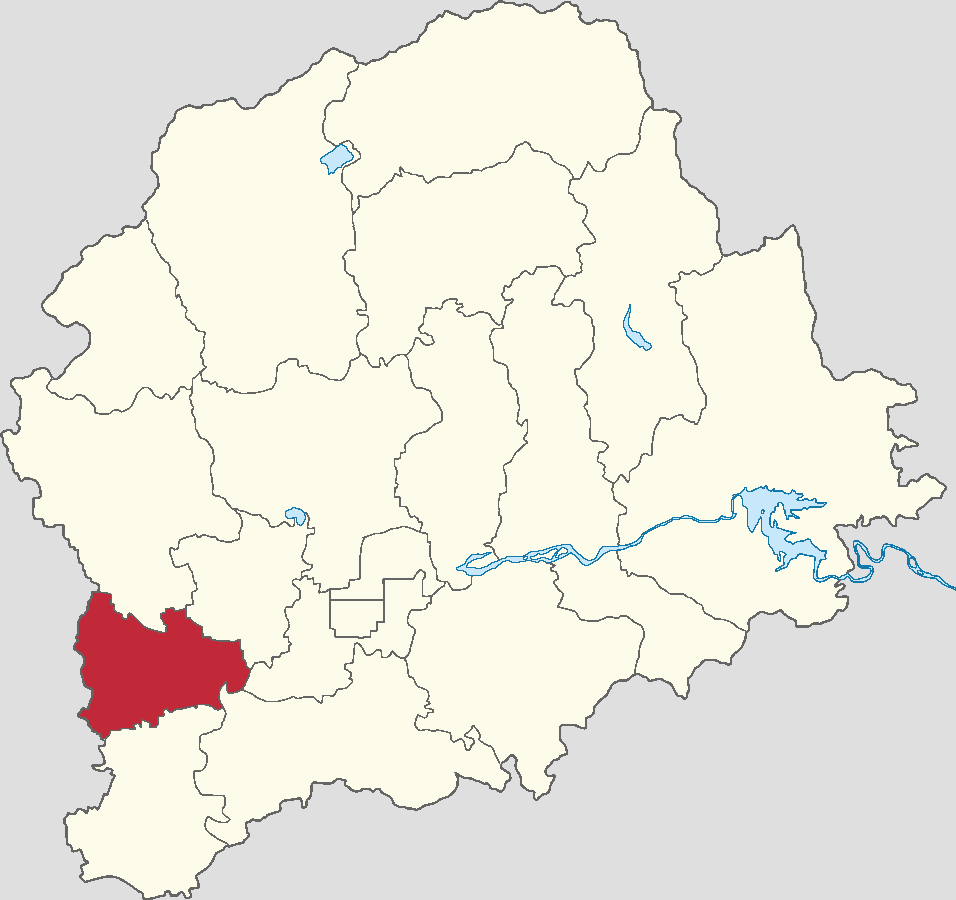
- Location of Machangying Town within Pinggu District

- Location within Beijing Location within China
- Coordinates: 40°08′00″N 117°00′56″E
- Country: China
- Municipality: Beijing
- District: Pinggu
- Village-level Divisions: 1 community 17 villages

Area
  - Total: 28.61 km^{2} (11.05 sq mi)
- Elevation: 31 m (102 ft)

Population (2020)
  - Total: 16,794
  - Density: 587.0/km^{2} (1,520/sq mi)
- Time zone: UTC+8 (China Standard)
- Postal code: 101214
- Area code: 010

Machangying Town (simplified Chinese: 马昌营镇; traditional Chinese: 馬昌營鎮; pinyin: Mǎchāngyíng Zhèn) is a town located on the western portion of Pinggu District, Beijing, China. It shares border with Yukou and Daxingzhuang Towns in its north, Pinggu Town in its east, Donggaocun and Mafang Towns in its south, as well as Dasungezhuang and Zhang Towns in its west. Its population was 16,794 in 2020.

Its name is taken from Machangying Village. The government of Machangying Town is now situated near Nandingfuzhuang Village.

== History ==
Timeline of Machangying's History
Year	Status	Within
1956 - 1958	Machangying Township Houruiying Township	Pinggu County, Hebei
1958 - 1961	Machangyng Management Area, part of Mafang People's Commune	Pinggu County, Beijing
1961 - 1984	Machangying People's Commune	Pinggu County, Beijing
1984 - 1996	Machangying Township	Pinggu County, Beijing
1996 - 2002	Machangying Town	Pinggu County, Beijing
2002–present	Machangying Town	Pinggu District, Beijing

== Administrative divisions ==
By the end of 2021, Machangying Town had 18 subdivisions, more specifically 1 community and 17 villages. These subdivisions are listed as follows:

Subdivision names	Name transliterations	Type
紫贵佳苑	Zigui Jiayuan	Community
圪塔头	Getatou	Village
王官屯	Wangguantun	Village
毛官营	Maoguanying	Village
王各庄	Wanggezhuang	Village
马昌营	Machangying	Village
魏辛庄	Weixinzhuang	Village
东陈各庄	Dongchengezhuang	Village
西陈各庄	Xichengezhuang	Village
东双营	Dongshuangying	Village
西双营	Xishuangying	Village
南定福庄	Nandingfuzhuang	Village
北定福庄	Beidingfuzhuang	Village
薄各庄	Bogezhuang	Village
天井	Tianjing	Village
前芮营	Qian Ruiying	Village
后芮营	Hou Ruiying	Village
西海子	Sihaizi	Village

== See also ==
- List of township-level divisions of Beijing
