= Jinhaihu =

Jinhaihu Town 金海湖镇
- Town
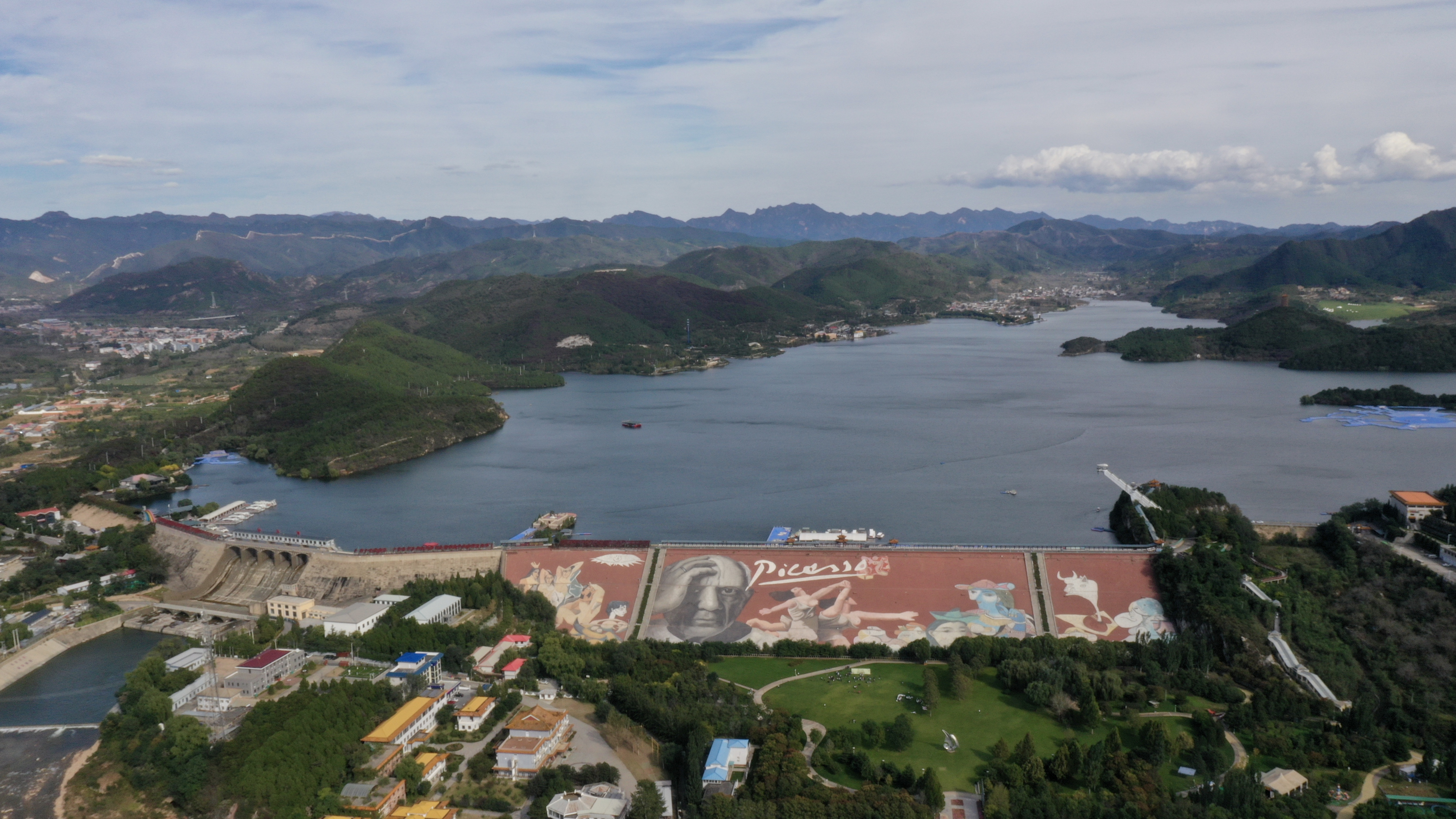
- Haizi Reservoir in eastern Jinhaihu, 2021

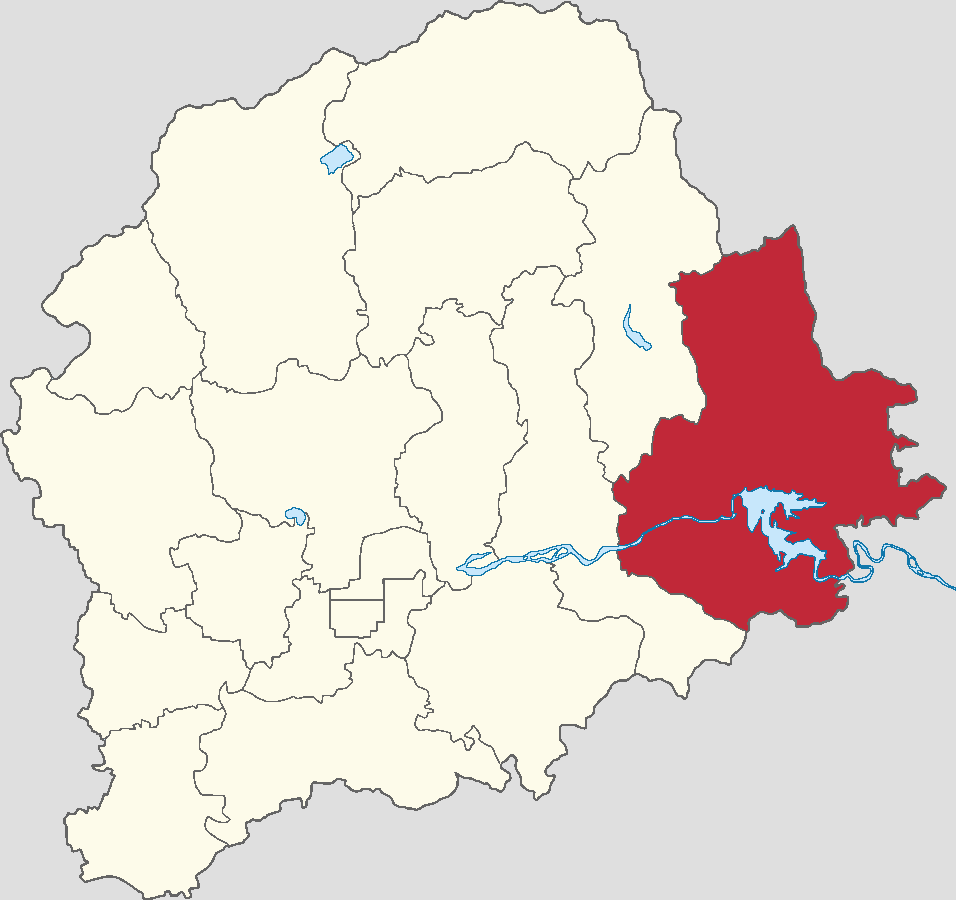
- Location in Pinggu District

- Location within Beijing Location within China
- Coordinates: 40°10′41″N 117°15′38″E
- Country: China
- Municipality: Beijing
- District: Pinggu
- Village-level Divisions: 2 communities 26 villages

Area
  - Total: 132.9 km^{2} (51.3 sq mi)
- Elevation: 73 m (240 ft)

Population (2020)
  - Total: 25,376
  - Density: 190.9/km^{2} (494.5/sq mi)
- Time zone: UTC+8 (China Standard)
- Postal code: 101201
- Area code: 010

Jinhaihu Town (Chinese: 金海湖镇; pinyin: Jīnhǎihú Zhèn) is a town located in eastern Pinggu District, Beijing, China. Surrounding by mountains to three sides, it borders Douziyu Township to the north, Xiaying Town to the east, Nandulehe Town to the south, and Huangsongyu Township. In 2020, it had a population of 25,376. Its name literally translates to "Golden Sea Lake".

== History ==
Timetable of Jinhaihu Town
Year	Status	Within
1946 - 1950	3rd District	Pinggu County, Hebei
1950 - 1956	3rd District	Pinggu County, Hebei
1956 - 1958	Kaoshanji Township	Pinggu County, Hebei
1958 - 1961	Kaoshanji Township	Pinggu County, Beijing
1961 - 1966	Hanzhuang People's Commune Kaoshanji People's Commune Hongshikan People's Commune	Pinggu County, Beijing
1966 - 1984	Hanzhuang People's Commune Kaoshanji People's Commune	Pinggu County, Beijing
1984 - 2001	Hanzhuang Township Kaoshanji Township	Pinggu County, Beijing
2001 - 2002	Hanzhuang Township Kaoshanji Town	Pinggu County, Beijing
2002–present	Jinhaihu Area (Jinhaihu Town)	Pinggu District, Beijing

== Administrative divisions ==
By the end of 2021, Jinhaihu Town was composed of 28 subdivisions, in which 2 were communities and 26 were villages. They are organized in the following list:

Subdivision names	Name transliterations	Type
罗汉石	Luohanshi	Community
东马各庄	Dong Magezhuang	Community
韩庄	Hanzhuang	Village
胡庄	Huzhuang	Village
东土门	Dongtumen	Village
马屯	Matun	Village
祖务	Zuwu	Village
耿井	Gengjing	Village
晏庄	Yanzhuang	Village
上宅	Shangzhai	Village
滑子	Huazi	Village
洙水	Zhushui	Village
水峪	Shuiyu	Village
向阳村	Xiangyangcun	Village
海子	Haizi	Village
靠山集	Kaoshanji	Village
郭家屯	Guojiatun	Village
东上营	Dongshangying	Village
茅山后	Maoshanhou	Village
小东沟	Xiaodonggou	Village
彰作	Zhangzuo	Village
红石门	Hongshimen	Village
中心村	Zhongxincun	Village
将军关	Jiangjunguan	Village
黑水湾	Heishuiwan	Village
黄草洼	Huangcaowa	Village
红石坎	Hongshikan	Village
上堡子	Shangbaozi	Village

== See also ==
- List of township-level divisions of Beijing
