= Dahuashan =

Dahuashan Town 大华山镇
- Town
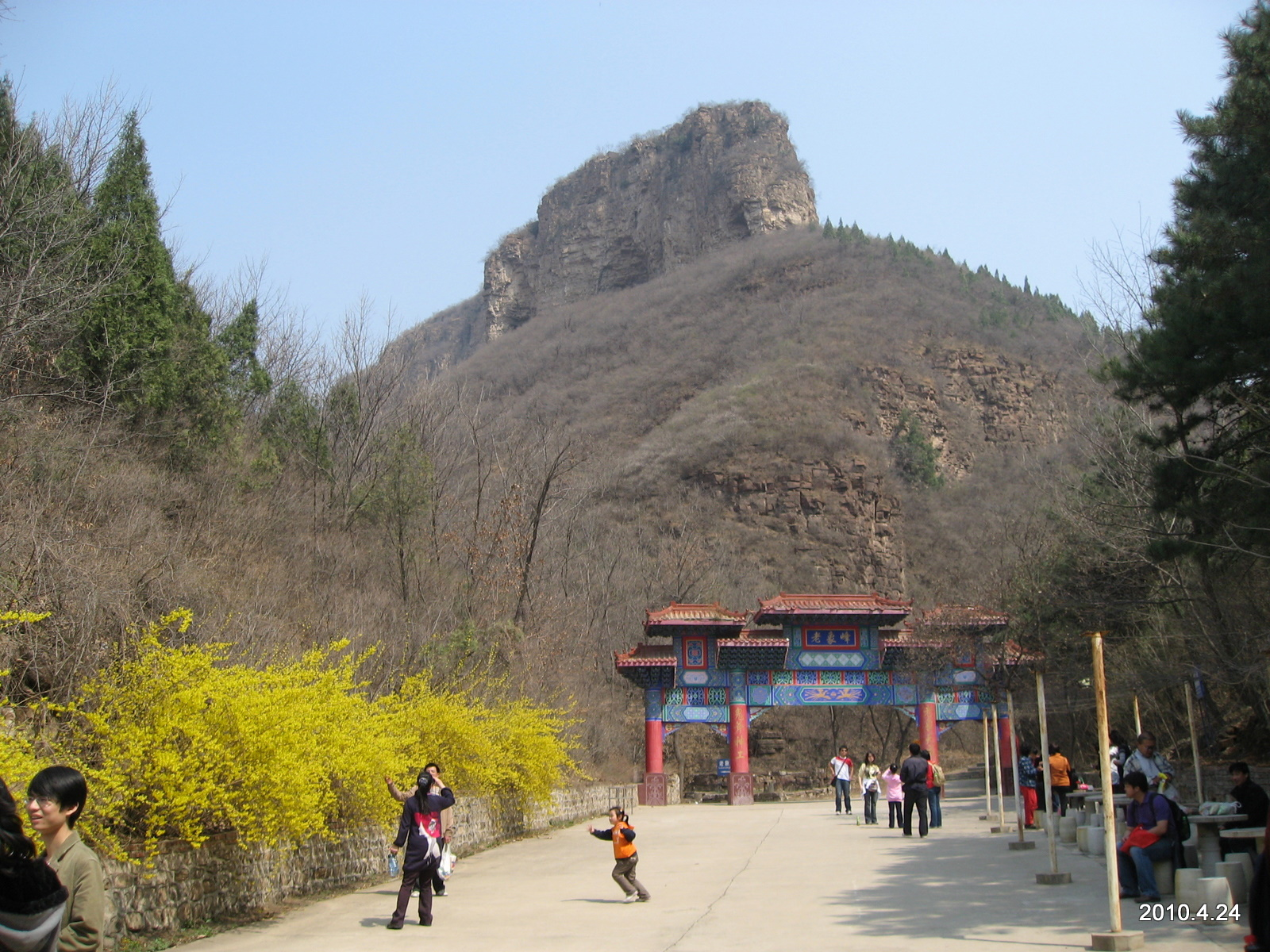
- Laoxiang Mountain on the northwest of the town, 2010

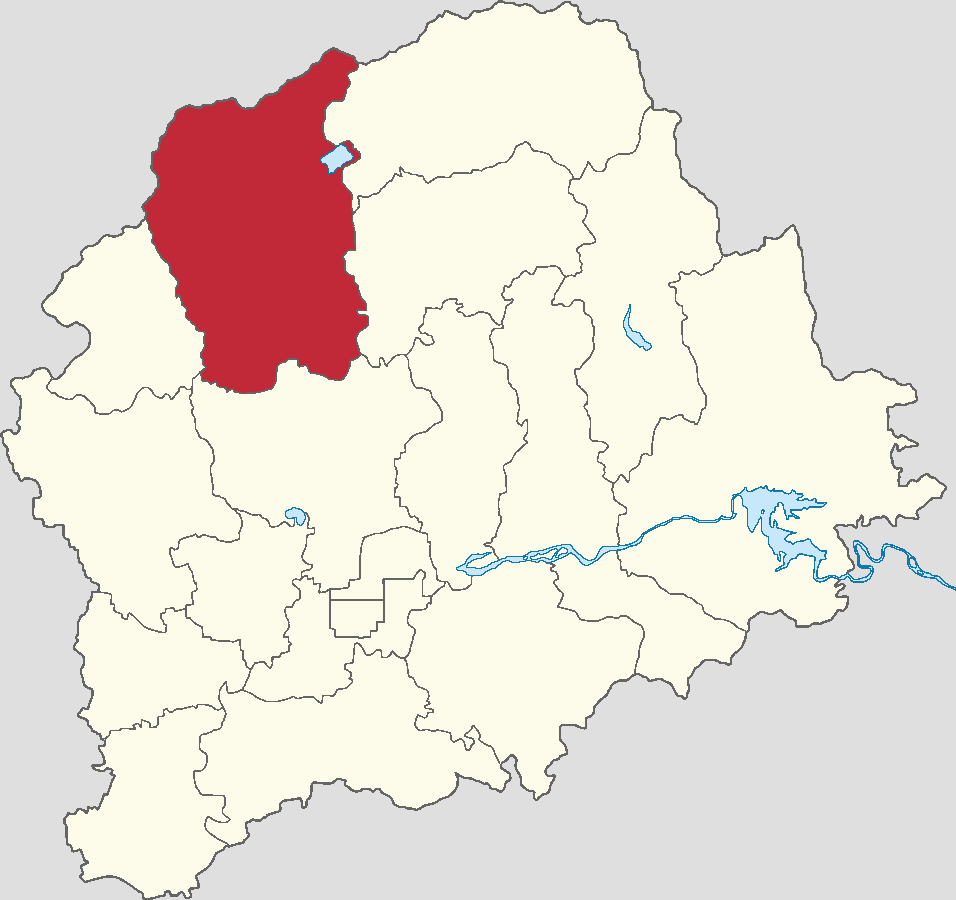
- Location of Dahuashan Town within Pinggu District

- Location within Beijing Location within China
- Coordinates: 40°16′36″N 117°03′35″E
- Country: China
- Municipality: Beijing
- District: Pinggu
- Village-level Divisions: 20 villages

Area
  - Total: 96.64 km^{2} (37.31 sq mi)
- Elevation: 118 m (387 ft)

Population (2020)
  - Total: 15,209
  - Density: 157.4/km^{2} (407.6/sq mi)
- Time zone: UTC+8 (China Standard)
- Postal code: 101207
- Area code: 010

Dahuashan Town (simplified Chinese: 大华山镇; traditional Chinese: 大華山鎮; pinyin: Dàhuàshān Zhèn) is a town situated on the northwestern part of Pinggu District, Beijing, China. Its southern portion is an alluvial plain, and is surrounded by mountains on the other three directions. The town shares border with Jugezhuang and Dachengzi Towns to its north, Zhenluoying Town and Xiong'erzhai Township to its east, Wangxinzhuang Town to its south, as well as Liujiadian and Dongshaoqu Towns to its west. As of 2020, it had a population of 15,209.

The name Dahuashan (Chinese: 大华山; lit. 'Great Magnificent Mountain') refers to the Dahua Mountain on the east of the town.

== History ==
Timeline of Dahuashan's History
Year	Status	Under
1946 - 1956		Pinggu County, Hebei
1956 - 1958	Dahuashan Township	Pinggu County, Hebei
1958 - 1984	Dahuashan People's Commune	Pinggu County, Beijing
1984 - 1990	Dahuashan Township	Pinggu County, Beijing
1990 - 2002	Dahuashan Town	Pinggu County, Beijing
2002–present	Dahuashan Town	Pinggu District, Beijing

== Administrative divisions ==
By the end of 2021, Dahuashan Town was divided into these 20 villages:

Subdivision names	Name transliterations
前北宫	Qian Beigong
后北宫	Hou Beigong
胜利村	Shenglicun
陈庄子	Chenzhuangzi
苏子峪	Suziyu
山门沟	Shanmengou
麻子峪	Maziyu
挂甲峪	Guajiayu
大华山	Dahuashan
砖瓦窑	Zhuanwayao
泉水峪	Quanshuiyu
西峪	Xiyu
西长峪	Xichangyu
西牛峪	Xiniuyu
瓦官头	Waguantou
梯子峪	Tiziyu
李家峪	Lijiayu
东辛撞	Dongxinzhuang
大峪子	Da Yuzi
小峪子	Xiao Yuzi

== Gallery ==
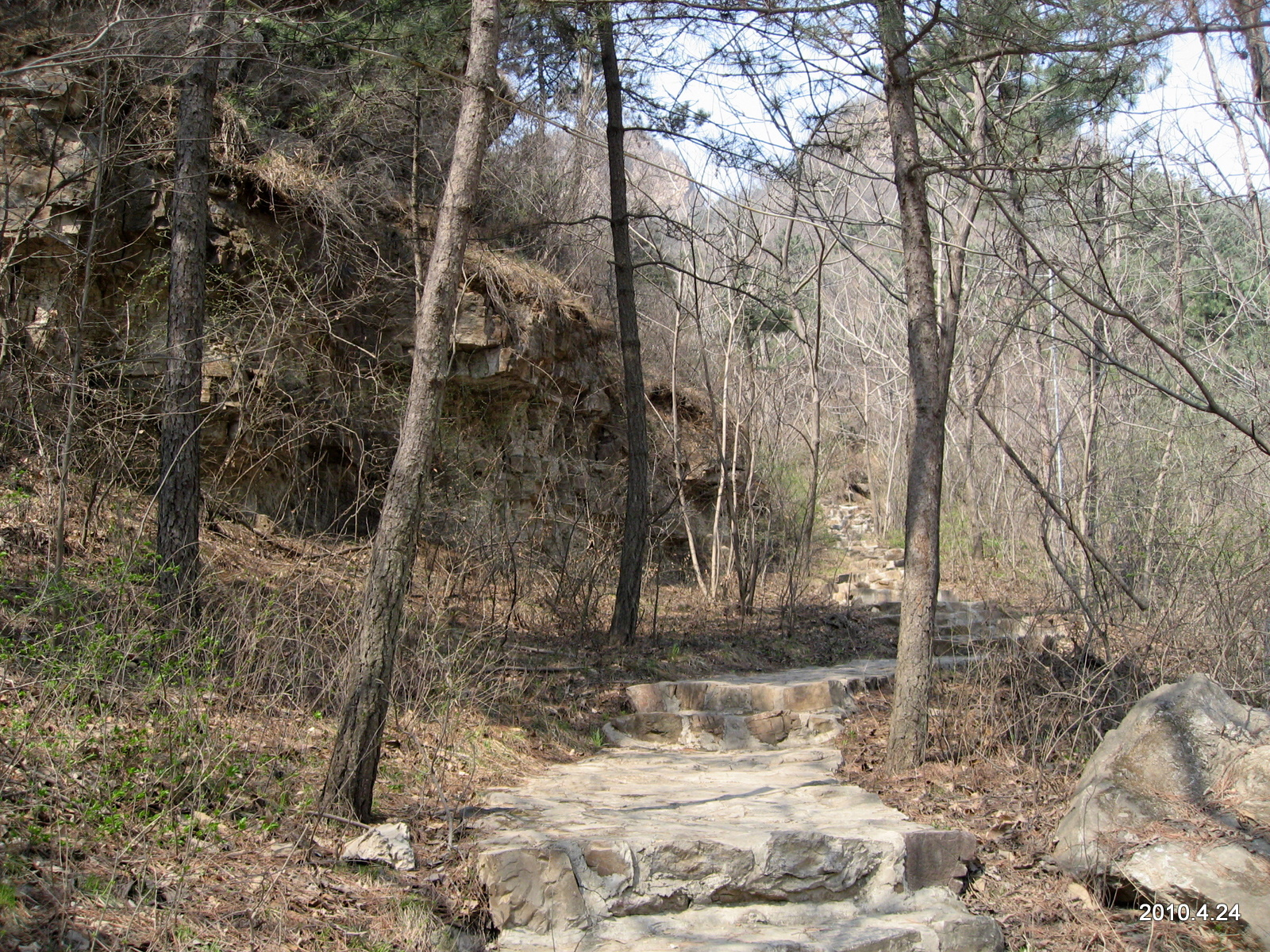
Trails on Laoxiang Mountain, 2010

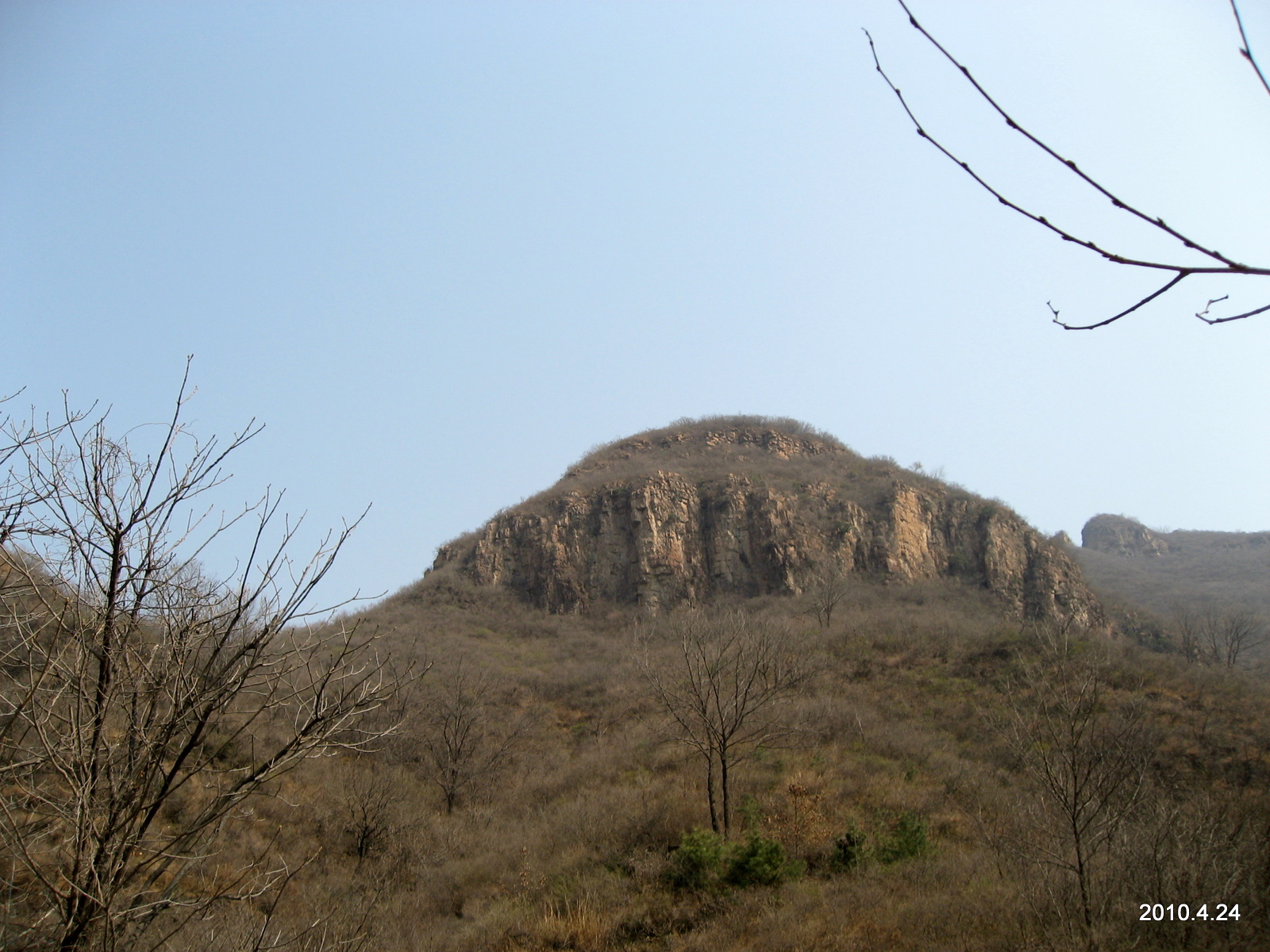
Huzhao Mountain, 2010

== See also ==
- List of township-level divisions of Beijing
