= Nandulehe =

Nandulehe Town 南独乐河镇
- Town
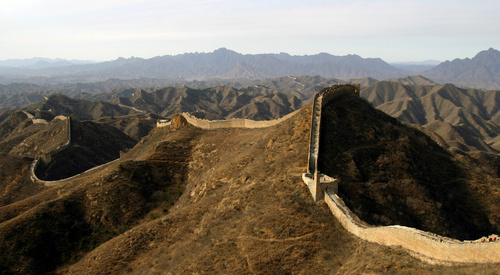
- Section of the Great Wall north of Emeishan Village, 2008

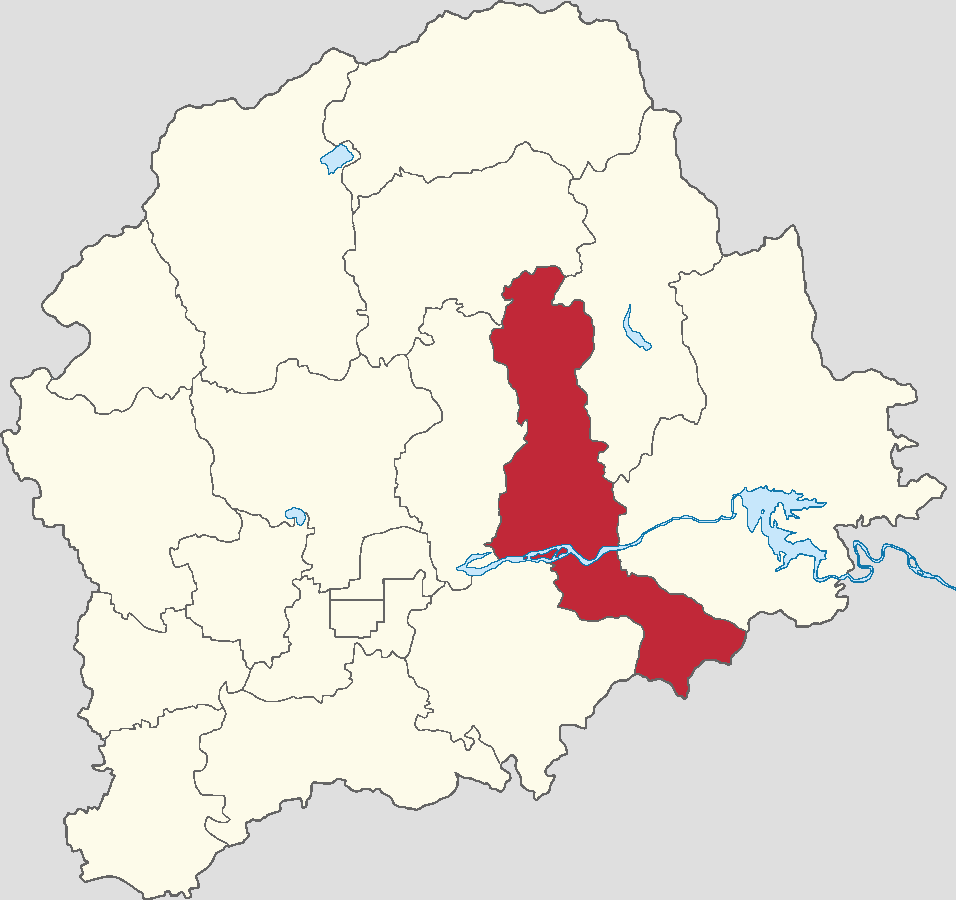
- Location within Pinggu District

- Location within Beijing Location within China
- Coordinates: 40°10′17″N 117°13′14″E
- Country: China
- Municipality: Beijing
- District: Pinggu
- Village-level Divisions: 13 villages

Area
  - Total: 69.45 km^{2} (26.81 sq mi)
- Elevation: 58 m (190 ft)

Population (2020)
  - Total: 18,847
  - Density: 271.4/km^{2} (702.9/sq mi)
- Time zone: UTC+8 (China Standard)
- Postal code: 101212
- Area code: 010

Nandulehe Town (simplified Chinese: 南独乐河镇; traditional Chinese: 南獨樂河鎮; pinyin: Nándúlèhé Zhèn) is a town located on the eastern Pinggu District, Beijing, China. Situated on the banks of Ju River, It borders Xiong'erzhai and Huangsongyu Townships in the north, Jinhaihu Town in the east, Xujiatai Township in the south, as well as Xiagezhuang and Shandongzhuang Towns in the west . It had 18,847 people residing within its borders as of 2020.

== History ==
Timeline of Nandulehe's History
Year	Status	Belonged to
1956 - 1958	Nandulehe Township	Pinggu County, Hebei
1958 - 1961	Hanzhuang People's Commune	Pinggu County, Beijing
1961 - 1984	Nandulehe People's Commune	Pinggu County, Beijing
1984 - 1990	Nandulehe Township	Pinggu County, Beijing
1990 - 2002	Nandulehe Town	Pinggu County, Beijing
2002–present	Nandulehe Town	Pinggu District, Beijing

== Administrative divisions ==
At the time of writing, Nandulehe Town is subdivided into the following 13 villages:

Subdivision names	Name transliterations
南独乐河	Nan Dulehe
北独乐河	Bei Dulehe
刘家河	Liujiahe
峨嵋山	Emeishan
北寨	Beizhai
公爷坟	Gongyefen
峰台	Fengtai
张辛庄	Zhangxinzhuang
望马台	Wangmatai
甘营	Ganying
南山村	Nanshancun
新农村	Xinnongcun
新立村	Xinlicun

== See also ==
- List of township-level divisions of Beijing
