= Shandongzhuang =

Shandongzhuang Town 山东庄镇
- Town
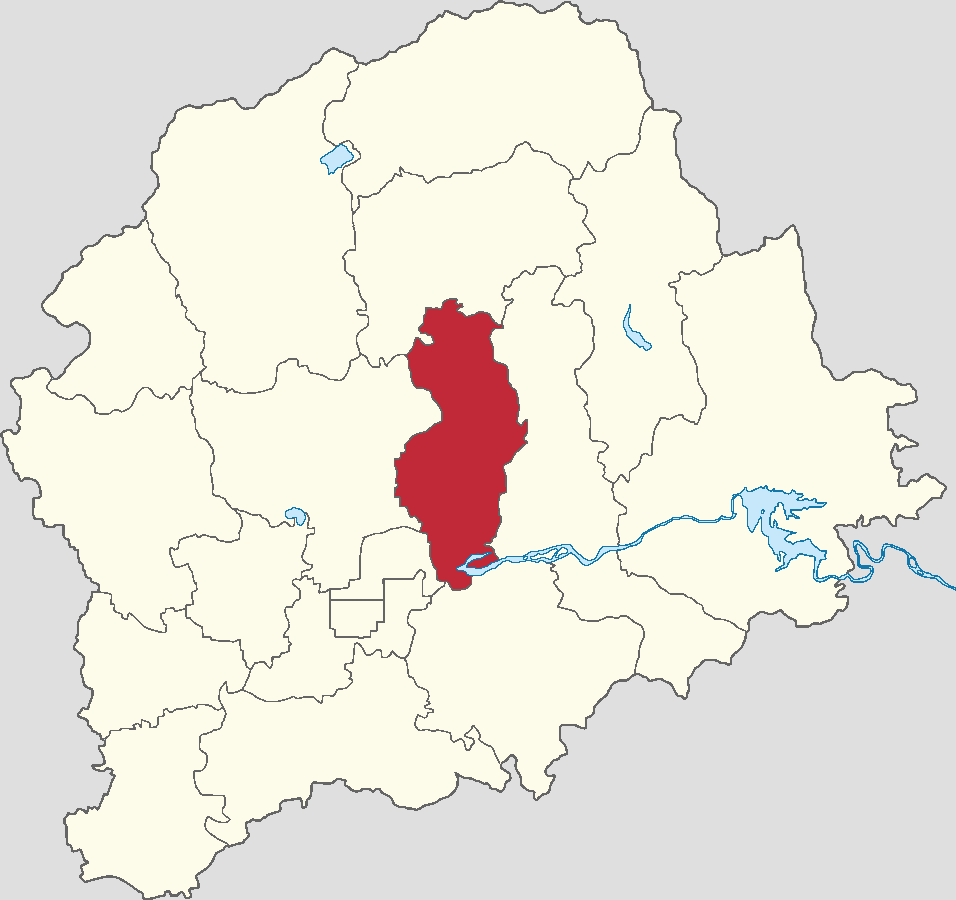
- Location of Shandongzhuang Town within Pinggu District

- Location within Beijing Location within China
- Coordinates: 40°11′12″N 117°09′06″E
- Country: China
- Municipality: Beijing
- District: Pinggu
- Village-level Divisions: 1 community 12 villages

Area
  - Total: 43.5 km^{2} (16.8 sq mi)
- Elevation: 46 m (151 ft)

Population (2020)
  - Total: 16,315
  - Density: 375/km^{2} (971/sq mi)
- Time zone: UTC+8 (China Standard)
- Postal code: 101211
- Area code: 010

Shandongzhuang Town (simplified Chinese: 山东庄镇; traditional Chinese: 山東莊鎮; pinyin: Shāndōngzhuāng Zhèn) is a town in the center of Pinggu District, Beijing, China. On the northeastern corner of Pinggu's urbanized area, It borders Xiong'erzhai Township to its north, Nandulehe Town to its east, Xiagezhuang Town to is south, as well as Xinggu Subdistrict and Wangxinzhuang Town to its west. In the year 2020, It was home to 16,315 residents. The name Shandongzhuang can be translated as "Villa East of Mountains"

== History ==
Timeline of Shandongzhuang's History
Year	Status	Within
1956 - 1958	Dabeiguan Township	Pinggu County, Hebei
1958 - 1961	Part of Chengguan People's Commune	Pinggu County, Beijing
1961 - 1984	Shandongzhuang People's Commune	Pinggu County, Beijing
1984 - 1990	Shandongzhuang Township	Pinggu County, Beijing
1990 - 2002	Shandongzhuang Town	Pinggu County, Beijing
2002–present	Shandongzhuang Town	Pinggu District, Beijing

== Administrative divisions ==
At the time of writing, Shandongzhuang Town consists of 13 subdivisions, with 1 community and 12 villages, which are listed as follows:

Subdivision names	Name transliterations	Type
棠韵家园	Tangyun Jiayuan	Community
桥头营	Qiaotouying	Village
西沥津	Xilijin	Village
大坎	Dakan	Village
东洼	Dongwa	Village
北寺	Beisi	Village
李辛庄	Lixinzhuang	Village
北屯	Beitun	Village
大北关	Da Beiguan	Village
小北关	Xiao Beiguan	Village
山东庄	Shandongzhuang	Village
鱼子山	Yuzishan	Village
桃棚	Taopeng	Village

== See also ==
- List of township-level divisions of Beijing
