= Donggaocun =

Donggaocun Town 东高村镇
- Town
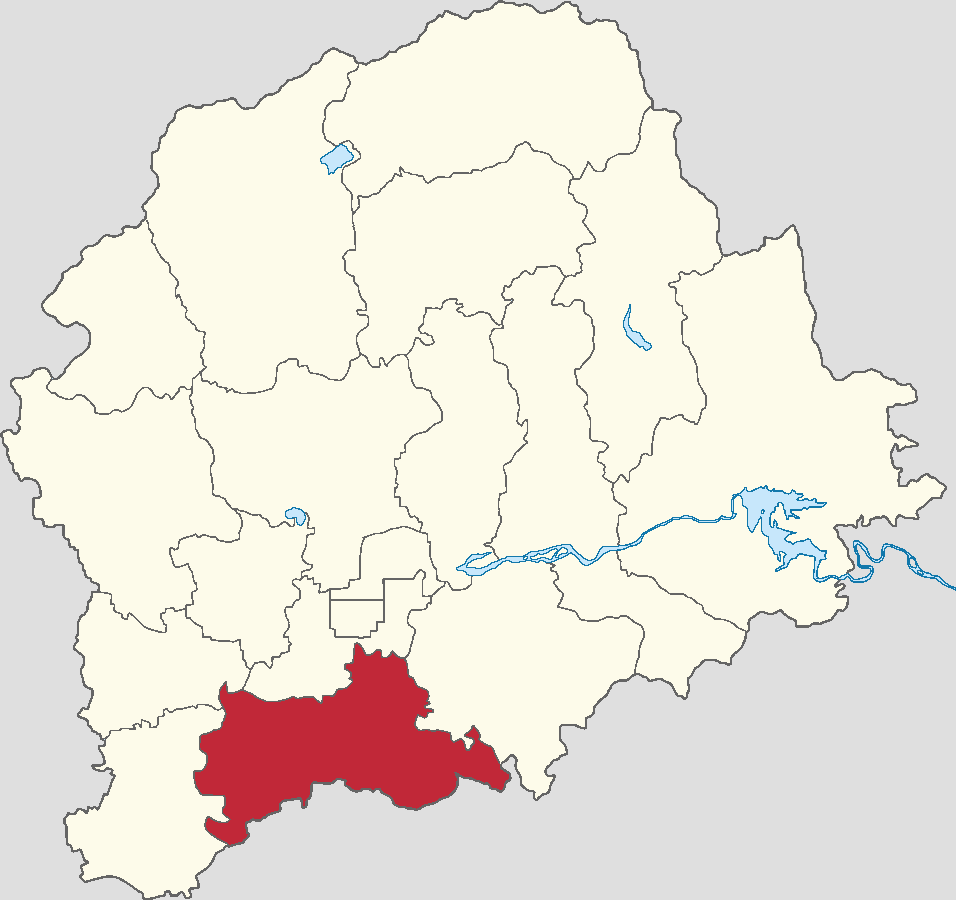
- Location of Donggaocun Town within Pinggu District

- Location within Beijing Location within China
- Coordinates: 40°06′07″N 117°06′27″E
- Country: China
- Municipality: Beijing
- District: Pinggu
- Village-level Divisions: 22 villages

Area
  - Total: 56.22 km^{2} (21.71 sq mi)
- Elevation: 30 m (98 ft)

Population (2020)
  - Total: 28,406
  - Density: 505.3/km^{2} (1,309/sq mi)
- Time zone: UTC+8 (China Standard)
- Postal code: 101200
- Area code: 010

Donggaocun Town (simplified Chinese: 东高村镇; traditional Chinese: 東高村鎮; pinyin: Dōnggāocūn Zhèn) is a town located on the southern edge of Pinggu District, Beijing, China. As a settlement along the Jingping Expressway, It shares border with Machangying and Pinggu Towns to its north, Xiagezhuang Town to its east, Duanjialing Town to its south, and Mafang Town to its west. In the year 2020, its population was 28,406. Its name was taken from Donggao (Chinese: 东高; lit. 'East High') Village, where the town's government is located.

== History ==
History of Donggaocun Town
Year	Status	Within
1956 - 1958	Donggaocun Township Menlouzhuang Township	Pinggu County, Hebei
1958 - 1961	Part of Chengguan People's Commune	Pinggu County, Beijing
1961 - 1984	Donggaocun People's Commune Menlouzhuang People's Commune	Pinggu County, Beijing
1984 - 1990	Donggaocun Township Menlouzhuang Township	Pinggu County, Beijing
1990 - 2000	Donggaocun Town Menlouzhuang Township	Pinggu County, Beijing
2000 - 2002	Donggaocun Town	Pinggu County, Beijing
2002–present	Donggaocun Town	Pinggu District, Beijing

== Administrative divisions ==
As of the year 2021, Donggaocun Town comprised 22 villages, all of which are listed in the table below:

Subdivision names	Name transliterations
东高村	Dong Gaocun
西高村	Xi Gaocun
南埝头	Nanniantou
大旺务	Dawangwu
大庄户	Dazhuanghu
赵家务	Zhaojiawu
赵庄户	Zhaozhuanghu
克头	Ketou
前台头	Qiantaitou
南张岱	Nan Zhangdai
北张岱	Bei Zhangdai
张岱辛撞	Zhangdai Xinzhuang
青杨屯	Qingyangzhuang
崔家庄	Cuijiazhuang
侯家庄	Houjiazhuang
门楼庄	Menlouzhuang
鲍家庄	Baojiazhuang
高家庄	Gaojiazhuang
曹家庄	Caojiazhuang
普贤屯	Puxiantun
南宅	Nanzhai
南宅庄户	Nanzhai Zhuanghu

== See also ==
- List of township-level divisions of Beijing
