= Area (Beijing) =

Township-level divisions in Beijing, China

Area (Chinese: 地区; pinyin: Dìqū) is a type of township-level divisions of China that is only used within Beijing. It is an intermediate designation between the rural township or town and the more urban subdistrict, and is given to settlements resembling desakotas.

Usually, each area within Beijing will also carry its previous respective designation as a town or township, and the town/township government will take additional role as the area office (Chinese: 地区办事处). Such a system is referred to as "One agency, two nameplates" (Chinese: 一个机构，两个牌子). For the most part, the area and town/township will share the same place name, such as Nanmofang and Liangxiang. However, there are also exceptions, such as the town name of Wanliu Area being Haidian. As of 2025, however, most official sources have begun to drop the 'area' name, and instead solely use 'town' or 'township'.

== History ==
Area as a township-level divisions was first implemented inside Chaoyang District, with the creation of 4 areas in 1993. Below is a table listing the creation dates of all areas:

Year	District	Areas Created
1993	Chaoyang	Nanmofang, Gaobeidian, Jiangtai and Taiyanggong
1994	Mentougou	Wangping
1998	Shunyi	Renhe, Houshayu, Tianzhu, Yangzhen, Niulanshan and Nanfaxin
1999	Chaoyang	Sunhe
1999	Fangshan	Liangxiang
1999	Shunyi	Mapo
1999	Changping	Nankou, Machikou and Shahe
2000	Fangshan	Zhoukoudian and Liulihe
2000	Tongzhou	Liyuan and Yongshun (Both abolished in 2020)
2001	Haidian	Wanliu and Dongsheng
2002	Chaoyang	Xiaohongmen and Changying
2002	Huairou	Huairou, Yanqi and Miaocheng
2002	Pinggu	Yuyang, Yukou, Mafang and Jinhaihu
2003	Chaoyang	Shibalidian, Pingfang, Dongfeng, Laiguangying, Sanjianfang, Guanzhuang and Dongba
2004	Chaoyang	Jinzhan, Cuigezhuang, Heizhuanghu, Dougezhuang and Wangsiying
2004	Changping	Dongxiaokou and Huilongguan (The latter was planned to be abolished in 2015, and actually abolished in 2019)
2005	Daxing	Yizhuang, Huangcun, Jiugong and Xihongmen
2005	Miyun	Tanying
2007	Daxing	Yinghai
2010	Fengtai	Lugouqiao, Huaxiang and Nanyuan (All of which were abolished in 2021)
2011	Haidian	Wenquan, Sijiqing, Xibeiwang, Sujiatuo and Shangzhuang
2012	Mentougou	Yongding and Longquan

== List of all current areas ==
As of 2021, these were a total of 56 areas within Beijing. They are listed as follows:

=== Chaoyang District ===
- Nanmofang Area/Nanmofang Township (南磨房地区/南磨房乡)
- Gaobeidian Area/Gaobeidian Township (高碑店地区/高碑店乡)
- Jiangtai Area/Jiangtai Township (将台地区/将台乡)
- Taiyanggong Area/Taiyanggong Township (太阳宫地区/太阳宫乡)
- Xiaohongmen Area/Xiaohongmen Township (小红门地区/小红门乡)
- Shibalidian Area/Shibalidian Township (十八里店地区/十八里店乡)
- Pingfang Area/Pingfang Township (平房地区/平房乡)
- Dongfeng Area/Dongfeng Township (东风地区/东风乡)
- Laiguangying Area/Laiguangying Township (来广营地区/来广营乡)
- Changying Area/Changying Township (常营地区/常营乡)
- Sanjianfang Area/Sanjianfang Township (三间房地区/三间房乡)
- Guanzhuang Area/Guanzhuang Township (管庄地区/管庄乡)
- Jinzhan Area/Jinzhan Township (金盏地区/金盏乡)
- Sunhe Area/Sunhe Township (孙河地区/孙河乡)
- Cuigezhuang Area/Cuigezhuang Township (崔各庄地区/崔各庄乡)
- Dongba Area/Dongba Township (东坝地区/东坝乡)
- Heizhuanghu Area/Heizhuanghu Township (黑庄户地区/黑庄户乡)
- Dougehuang Area/Dougezhuang Township (豆各庄地区/豆各庄乡)
- Wangsiying Area/Wangsiying Township (王四营地区/王四营乡)

=== Haidian District ===
- Wanliu Area/Haidian Town (万柳地区/海淀镇)
- Dongsheng Area/Dongsheng Town (东升地区/东升镇)
- Wenquan Area/Wenquan Town (温泉地区/温泉镇)
- Sijiqing Area/Sijiqing Town (四季青地区/四季青镇)
- Xibeiwang Area/Xibeiwang Town (西北旺地区/西北旺镇)
- Sujiatuo Area/Sujiatuo Town (苏家坨地区/苏家坨镇)
- Shangzhuang Area/Shangzhuang Town (上庄地区/上庄镇)

=== Mentougou District ===
- Wangping Area/Wangping Town (王平地区/王平镇)
- Yongding Area/Yongding Town (永定地区/永定镇)
- Longquan Area/Longquan Town (龙泉地区/龙泉镇)

=== Fangshan District ===
- Liangxiang Area/Liangxiang Town (良乡地区/良乡镇)
- Zhoukoudian Area/Zhoukoudian Town (周口店地区/周口店镇)
- Liulihe Area/Liulihe Town (琉璃河地区/琉璃河镇)

=== Shunyi District ===
- Renhe Area/Renhe Town (仁和地区/仁和镇)
- Houshayu Area/Houshayu Town (后沙峪地区/后沙峪镇)
- Tianzhu Area/Tianzhu Town (天竺地区/天竺镇)
- Yangzhen Area/Yang Town (杨镇地区/杨镇)
- Niulanshan Area/Niulanshan Town (牛栏山地区/牛栏山镇)
- Nanfaxin Area/Nanfaxin Town (南法信地区/南法信镇)
- Mapo Area/Mapo Town (马坡地区/马坡镇)

=== Changping District ===
- Nankou Area/Nankou Town (南口地区/南口镇)
- Machikou Area/Machikou Town (马池口地区/马池口镇)
- Shahe Area/Shahe Town (沙河地区/沙河镇)
- Dongxiaokou Area/Dongxiaokou Town (东小口地区/东小口镇)

=== Daxing District ===
- Yizhuang Area/Yizhuang Town (亦庄地区/亦庄镇)
- Huangcun Area/Huangcun Town (黄村地区/黄村镇)
- Jiugong Area/Jiugong Town (旧宫地区/旧宫镇)
- Xihongmen Area/Xihongmen Town (西红门地区/西红门镇)
- Yinghai Area/Yinghai Town (瀛海地区/瀛海镇)

=== Huairou District ===
- Huairou Area/Huairou Town (怀柔地区/怀柔镇)
- Yanqi Area/Yanqi Town (雁栖地区/雁栖镇)
- Miaocheng Area/Miaocheng Town (庙城地区/庙城镇)

=== Pinggu District ===
- Yuyang Area/Pinggu Town (渔阳地区/平谷镇)
- Yukou Area/Yukou Town (峪口地区/峪口镇)
- Mafang Area/Mafang Town (马坊地区/马坊镇)
- Jinhaihu Area/Jinhaihu Town (金海湖地区/金海湖镇)

=== Miyun District ===
- Tanying Area/Tanying Manchu and Mongolian Ethnic Township (檀营地区/檀营满族蒙古族乡)
