= Dougezhuang =

Dougezhuang Township 豆各庄乡
- Township
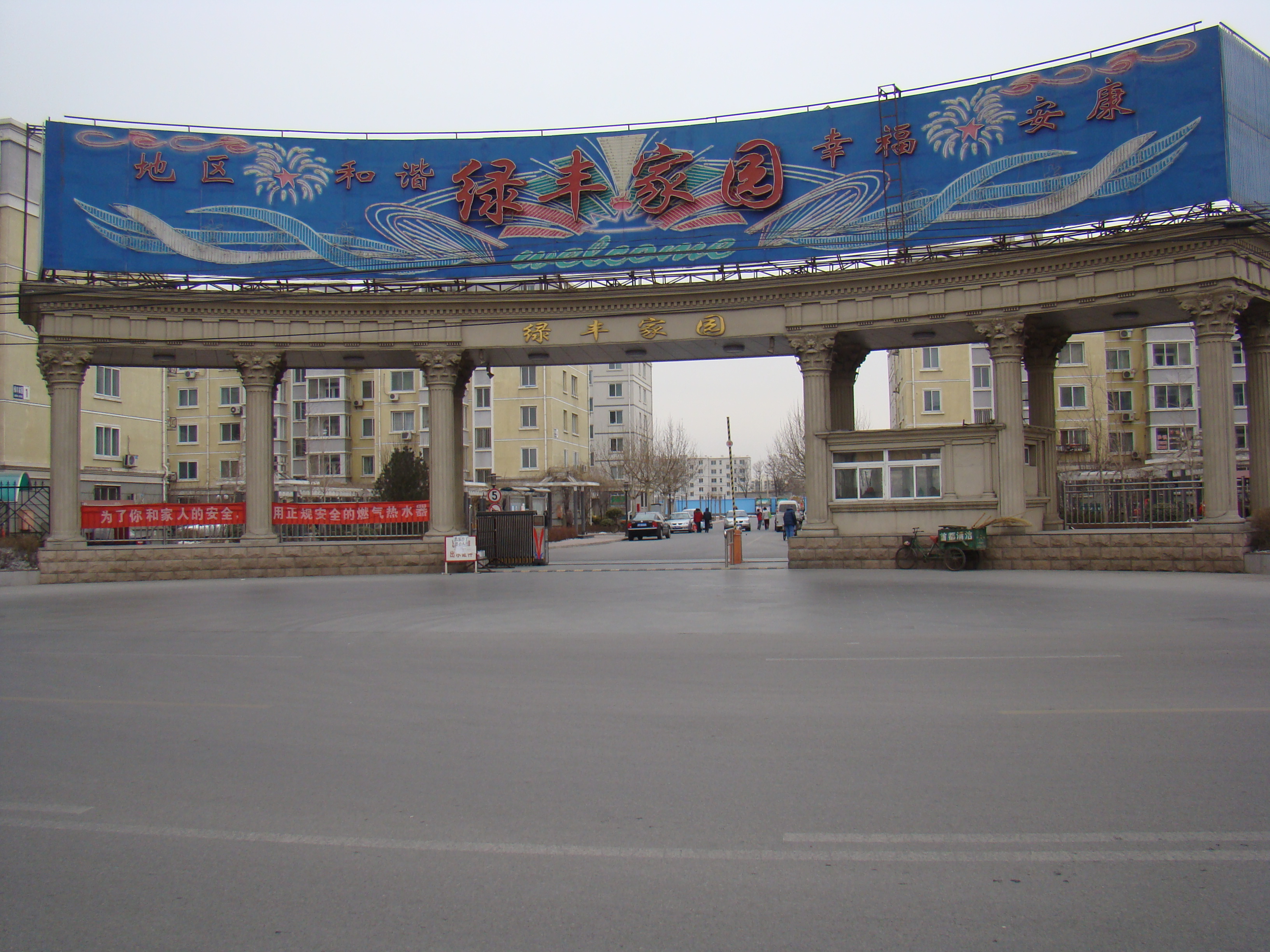
- Gate of Lüfeng Jiayuan on the center of the area, 2010

- Location within Beijing Location within China
- Coordinates: 39°51′28″N 116°33′32″E
- Country: China
- Municipality: Beijing
- District: Chaoyang
- Village-level Divisions: 12 communities 12 villages

Area
  - Total: 14.16 km^{2} (5.47 sq mi)

Population (2020)
  - Total: 53,766
  - Density: 3,797/km^{2} (9,834/sq mi)
- Time zone: UTC+8 (China Standard)
- Postal code: 100023
- Area code: 010

Dougezhuang Township (Chinese: 豆各庄乡; pinyin: Dòugèzhuāng Xiāng) is a township located on the southern part of Chaoyang District, Beijing, China. It borders Gaobeidian and Sanjianfang Townships to the north, Guanzhuang and Heizhuanghu Townships to the east, Taihu Town to the south, Fatou Subdistrict, Wangsiying and Shibalidian Townships to the west. It has a population of 53,766 as of 2020.

The name of this area, Dougezhuang (Chinese: 豆各庄; lit. 'Dou Family Villa') was historically the residence of Dou (Chinese: 窦) family, and later got corrupted to the name used today.

== History ==
Timeline Dougezhuang Area
Year	Status
1961	Established as a management station, part of People's Commune of Chaoyang
1965	Became a management district, part of People's Commune of Shuangqiao
1983	Transformed into a township
1998	Transferred under Chaoyang District
2004	Became an area while retaining township status

== Administrative Divisions ==
As of 2021, the 24 subdivisions of Dougezhuang were administered as 12 communities and 12 villages:

Administrative Division Code	Community Name in Simplified Chinese	Community Name in English	Type
110105041003	青青家园	Qingqing Jiayuan	Community
110105041004	绿丰家园	Lüfeng Jiayuan	Community
110105041005	阳光家园	Yangguang Jiayuan	Community
110105041006	京城雅居	Jingcheng Yaju	Community
110105041007	文化传播	Wenhua Chuanbo	Community
110105041008	朝丰家园	Chaofeng Jiayuan	Community
110105041010	富力又一城第一	Fuliyou Yicheng Diyi	Community
110105041011	富力又一城第二	Fuliyou Yicheng Di'er	Community
110105041012	明德园	Mingdeyuan	Community
110105041013	青荷里	Qingheli	Community
110105041014	御景湾	Yujingwan	Community
110105041015	宸欣园	Chenxinyuan	Community
110105041200	豆各庄	Dougezhuang	Village
110105041201	马家湾	Majiawan	Village
110105041202	水牛坊	Shuiniufang	Village
110105041203	孙家坡	Sunjiapo	Village
110105041204	孟家屯	Mengjiatun	Village
110105041205	东马各庄	Dongma Getun	Village
110105041206	西马各庄	Xima Getun	Village
110105041207	于家围南队	Yujia Weinandui	Village
110105041208	于家围北队	Yujia Weibeidui	Village
110105041209	南何家村	Nanhejiacun	Village
110105041210	石槽村	Shicaocun	Village
110105041211	黄厂村	Huangchangcun	Village

== See also ==
- List of township-level divisions of Beijing
