= Haidian (disambiguation) =

Haidian is a district in Beijing, China.

Haidian may also refer to:

- Haidian Subdistrict, a subdistrictin Haidian District, Beijing
- Haidian Town, a town in Haidian District, Beijing
- Haidian River, in Haikou, Hainan, China
- Haidian Island, in Haikou, Hainan, China
- Haidian Huangzhuang station, subway station in Beijing
- Haidian Wuluju station, subway station in Beijing
