= Liyuan, Beijing =

Liyuan Town 梨园镇
- Town
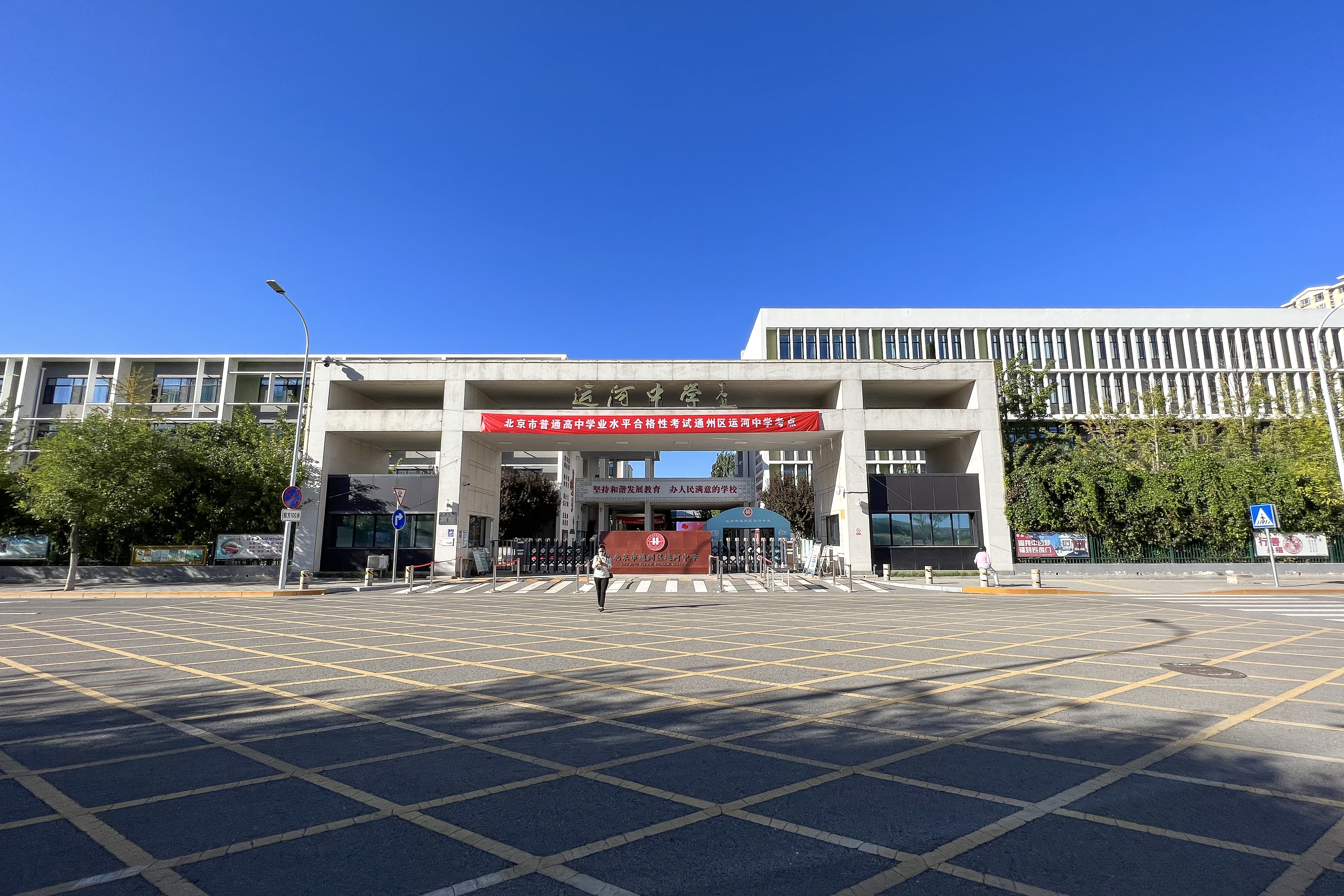
- Western Campus of Beijing Yunhe Middle School, 2022

- Location within Beijing Location within China
- Coordinates: 39°51′56″N 116°39′26″E
- Country: China
- Municipality: Beijing
- District: Tongzhou
- Village-level Divisions: 15 communities 26 villages

Area
  - Total: 19.87 km^{2} (7.67 sq mi)

Population (2020)
  - Total: 285,445
  - Density: 14,370/km^{2} (37,210/sq mi)
- Time zone: UTC+8 (China Standard)
- Postal code: 101121
- Area code: 010

Liyuan Town (simplified Chinese: 梨园镇; traditional Chinese: 梨園鎮; pinyin: Líyuán Zhèn) is a town situated in northwestern side of Tongzhou District, Beijing, China. It shares border with Yangzhuang and Jiukeshu Subdistricts to the north, Linheli Subdistrict to the northeast, Zhangjiawan Town to the east, Wenjing Subdistrict to the south, and Heizhuanghu Township to the west. As of 2020, its total population was 285,445.

The town's name Liyuan (Chinese: 梨园; lit. 'Pear Orchard') came from a pear orchard within the region during the Ming dynasty.

== History ==
Timeline of Liyuan Town's History
| Year | Status | Within |
|---|---|---|
| 1946 – 1950 | Zhangjiawan Township; Dagaocun Township | Tong County |
| 1950 – 1956 | 6th District | Tong County |
| 1956 – 1958 | Tuqiao Township; Dagaocun Township | Tong County |
| 1958 – 1961 | Part of Zhangjiawan People's Commune | Tong County |
| 1961 – 1965 | Part of Tuqiao People's Commune and Dagaocun People's Commune | Tong County |
| 1965 – 1972 | Part of Chengguan People's Commune and Zhangjiawan People's Commune | Tong County |
| 1972 – 1983 | Liyuan People's Commune | Tong County |
| 1983 – 1990 | Liyuan Township | Tong County |
| 1990 – 1997 | Liyuan Town | Tong County |
| 1997 – 2000 | Liyuan Area | Tongzhou District |
| 2000 – 2020 | Liyuan Area (Liyuan Town) | Tongzhou District |
| 2020–present | Liyuan Town | Tongzhou District |

== Administration divisions ==
In the year 2021, Liyuan Town was made up of 41 subdivisions, including 15 communities and 26 villages:

| Administrative division code | Subdivision names | Name transliteration | Type |
|---|---|---|---|
| 110112121004 | 万盛北里 | Wansheng Beili | Community |
| 110112121008 | 京洲园 | Jingzhouyuan | Community |
| 110112121013 | 群芳园 | Qunfangyuan | Community |
| 110112121014 | 颐瑞西里 | Yirui Xili | Community |
| 110112121015 | 颐瑞东里 | Yirui Dongli | Community |
| 110112121016 | 欣达园 | Xindayuan | Community |
| 110112121017 | 曼城家园 | Mancheng Jiayuan | Community |
| 110112121020 | 大方居 | Dafangju | Community |
| 110112121021 | 通景园 | Tongjingyuan | Community |
| 110112121022 | 新城乐居 | Xincheng Yueju | Community |
| 110112121027 | 怡然 | Yiran | Community |
| 110112121028 | 群芳一园 | Qunfang Yiyuan | Community |
| 110112121029 | 通大家园 | Tongda Jiayuan | Community |
| 110112121030 | 大方居北区 | Dafangju Beiqu | Community |
| 110112121031 | 晟世嘉园 | Shengshi Jiayuan | Community |
| 110112121201 | 车里坟 | Chelifen | Village |
| 110112121202 | 三间房 | Sanjianfang | Village |
| 110112121203 | 北杨洼 | Beiyangwa | Village |
| 110112121204 | 九棵树 | Jiukeshu | Village |
| 110112121205 | 东总屯 | Dong Zongtun | Village |
| 110112121206 | 西总屯 | Xi Zongtun | Village |
| 110112121207 | 李老公庄 | Lilao Gongzhuang | Village |
| 110112121208 | 梨园 | Liyuan | Village |
| 110112121209 | 刘老公庄 | Liulao Gongzhuang | Village |
| 110112121210 | 小街一队 | Xiaojie Yidui | Village |
| 110112121211 | 小街二队 | Xiaojie Erdui | Village |
| 110112121212 | 小街三队 | Xiaojie Sandui | Village |
| 110112121213 | 西小马庄 | Xixiaomazhuang | Village |
| 110112121214 | 半壁店 | Banbidian | Village |
| 110112121215 | 孙王场 | Sunwangchang | Village |
| 110112121216 | 孙庄 | Sunzhuang | Village |
| 110112121217 | 砖厂 | Zhuanchang | Village |
| 110112121218 | 公庄 | Gongzhuang | Village |
| 110112121219 | 大稿 | Dagao | Village |
| 110112121220 | 小稿 | Xiaogao | Village |
| 110112121221 | 魏家坟 | Weijiafen | Village |
| 110112121222 | 东小马庄 | Dong Xiaomazhuang | Village |
| 110112121223 | 大马庄 | Damazhuang | Village |
| 110112121224 | 高楼金 | Gaoloujin | Village |
| 110112121225 | 曹园 | Caoyuan | Village |
| 110112121226 | 将军坟 | Jiangjunfen | Village |

== Economics ==
In 2018, the total tax revenue of Liyuan Town was 1.2 billion Chinese yuan, and the average personal income of the residents was 38 thousand Chinese yuan.

== See also ==
- List of township-level divisions of Beijing
