= Sijiqing, Beijing =

Sijiqing Town 四季青镇
- Town
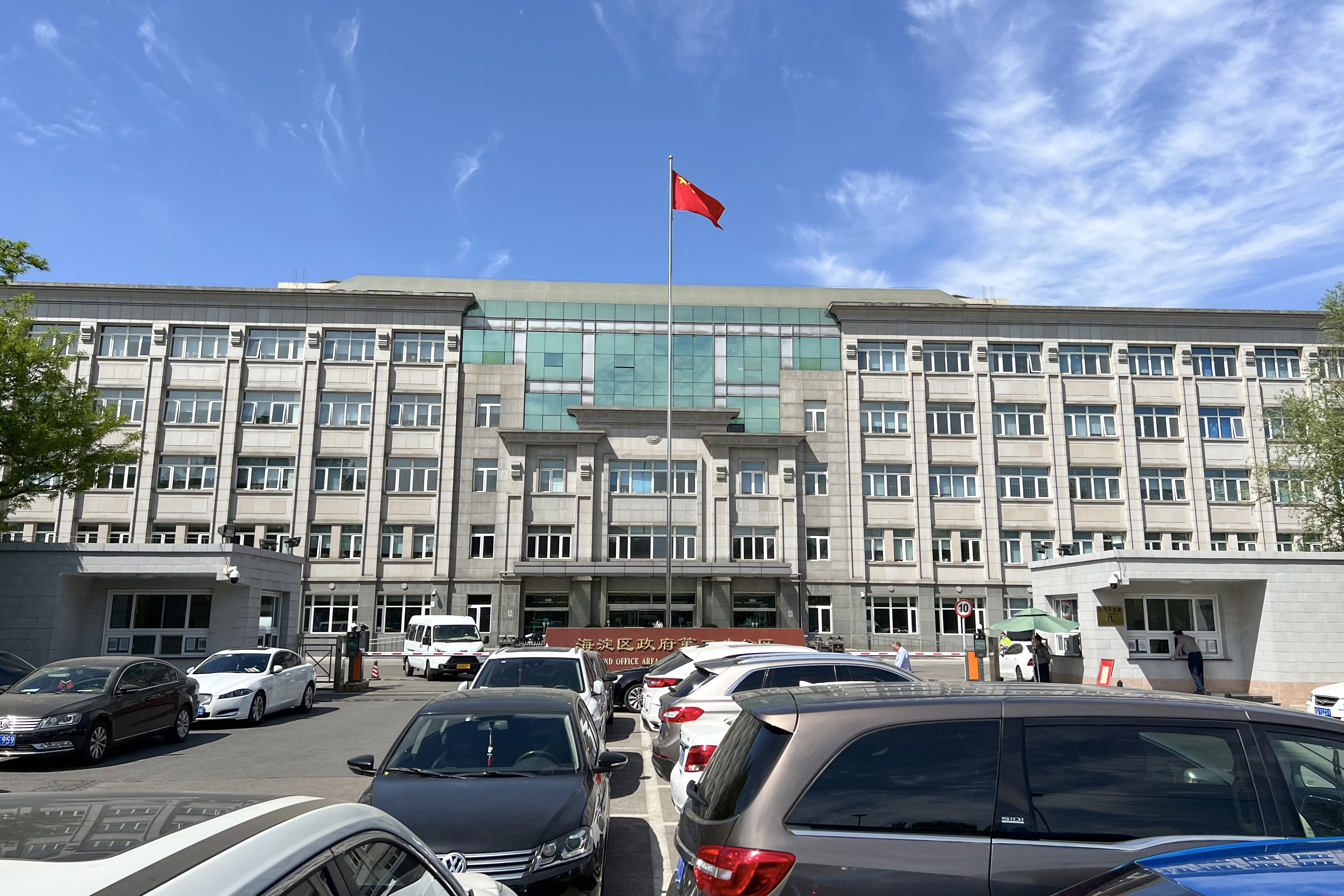
- Second Office Area of Haidian District Government within the town, 2022

- Location within Beijing Location within China
- Coordinates: 39°57′10″N 116°16′07″E
- Country: China
- Municipality: Beijing
- District: Haidian
- Village-level Divisions: 12 communities 10 villages 2 residential area

Area
  - Total: 40.82 km^{2} (15.76 sq mi)

Population (2020)
  - Total: 162,700
  - Density: 3,986/km^{2} (10,320/sq mi)
- Time zone: UTC+8 (China Standard)
- Postal code: 100081
- Area code: 010

Sijiqing Town (Chinese: 四季青镇; pinyin: Sìjìqīng Zhèn) is a town on southern Haidian District, Beijing, China. It borders Wanliu Area, Xiangshan and Qinglongqiao Subdistricts to the north, Shuguang Subdistrict to the east, Tiancunlu Subdistrict to the south, Bajiao, Pingguoyuan and Wulituo Subdistricts to the west. It had a population of 162,700 as of 2020.

The subdistrict, Sijiqing (Chinese: 四季青; lit. 'Four Seasons Green'), was named after a greenhouse production cooperative that was built in the area during the 1950s.

== History ==
Timeline of Sijiqing Area
Year	Status
1958	The following 8 Agricultural Cooeratives were merged to form Sijiqing People's Commune: Sijiqing; Xishan; Luodaozhuang; Shawo; Tiancun; Wanshousi; Xiangshan; Yuquan
1959	Jushang Farm was incorporated as a production team
1983	Transformed into a township
2004	Transformed into a town
2011	Became an area while retaining the status of a town

== Administrative Divisions ==
Sijiqing Area administered 24 subdivisions, including 12 communities, 10 villages and 2 residential areas:

Administrative division code	Subdivision names	Name transliteration	Type
110108027001	门头村	Mentoucun	Community
110108027002	巨山家园	Jushan Jiayuan	Community
110108027003	常青园	Changqingyuan	Community
110108027004	天香颐北里	Tianxiangyi Beili	Community
110108027005	西郊机场	Xijiao Jichang	Community
110108027006	郦城	Licheng	Community
110108027007	闵航南里	Minhang Nanli	Community
110108027008	宝山	Baoshan	Community
110108027009	玉泉	Yuquan	Community
110108027010	西山	Xishan	Community
110108027011	西冉	Xiran	Community
110108027012	振兴	Zhenxing	Community
110108027201	田村	Tiancun	Village
110108027202	宝山	Baoshan	Village
110108027203	振兴	Zhenxing	Village
110108027206	西冉	Xiran	Village
110108027207	西山	Xishan	Village
110108027208	双新	Shuangxin	Village
110108027209	玉泉	Yuquan	Village
110108027210	门头村	Mentoucun	Village
110108027211	巨山	Jushan	Village
110108027212	香山	Xiangshan	Village
110108027500	通达村民事务综合服务中心	Tongda Cunmin Shiwu Zonghe Fuwu Zhongxin	Residential Area
110108027501	常青村民事务综合服务中心	Changqing Cunmin Shiwu Zonghe Fuwu Zhongxin	Residential Area

== See also ==
- List of township-level divisions of Beijing
