= Yinghai, Beijing =

Yinghai Area 瀛海地区 Yinghai Town（瀛海镇）
- Area & Town
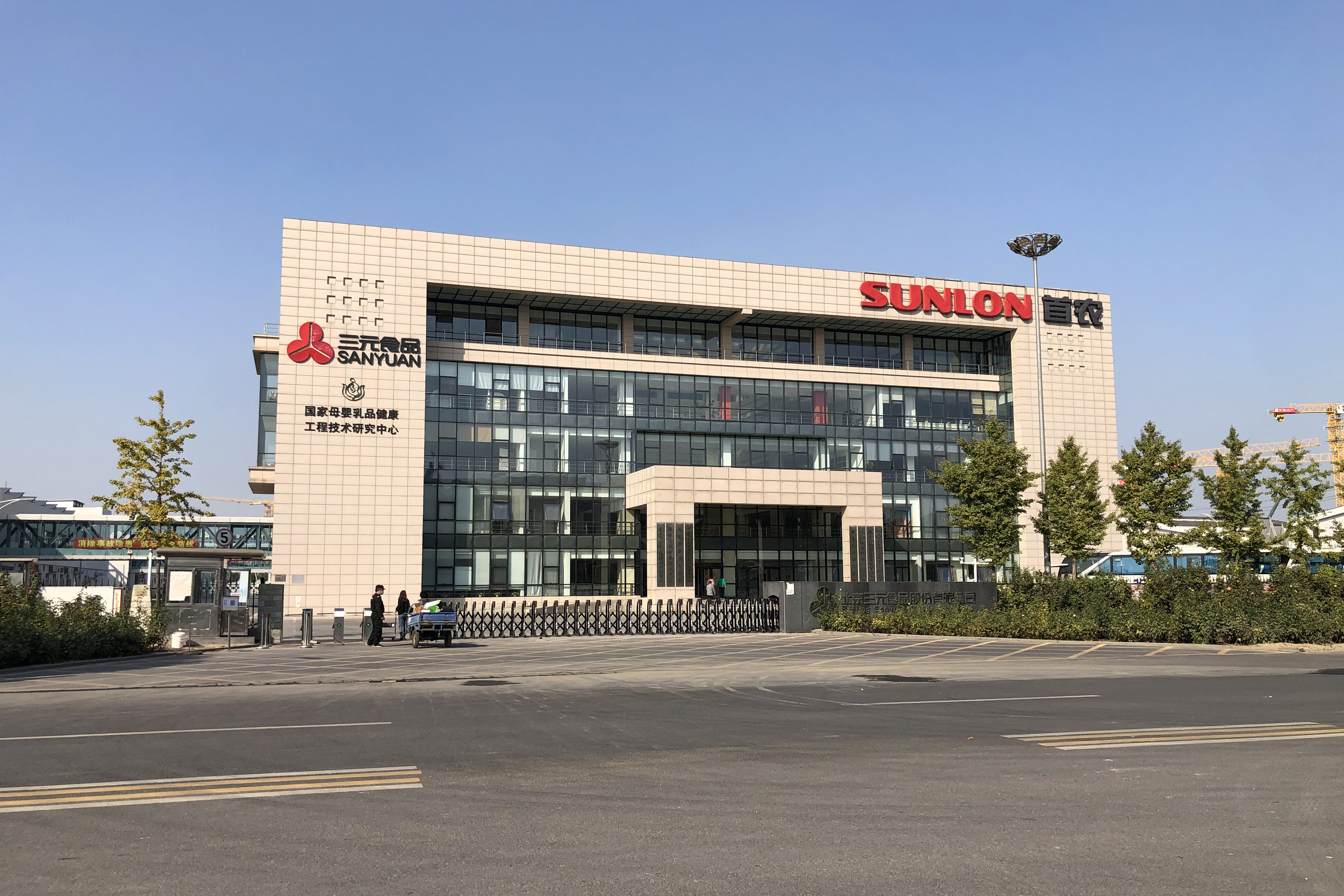
- Headquarter of Sanyuan Group within Yinghai, 2020

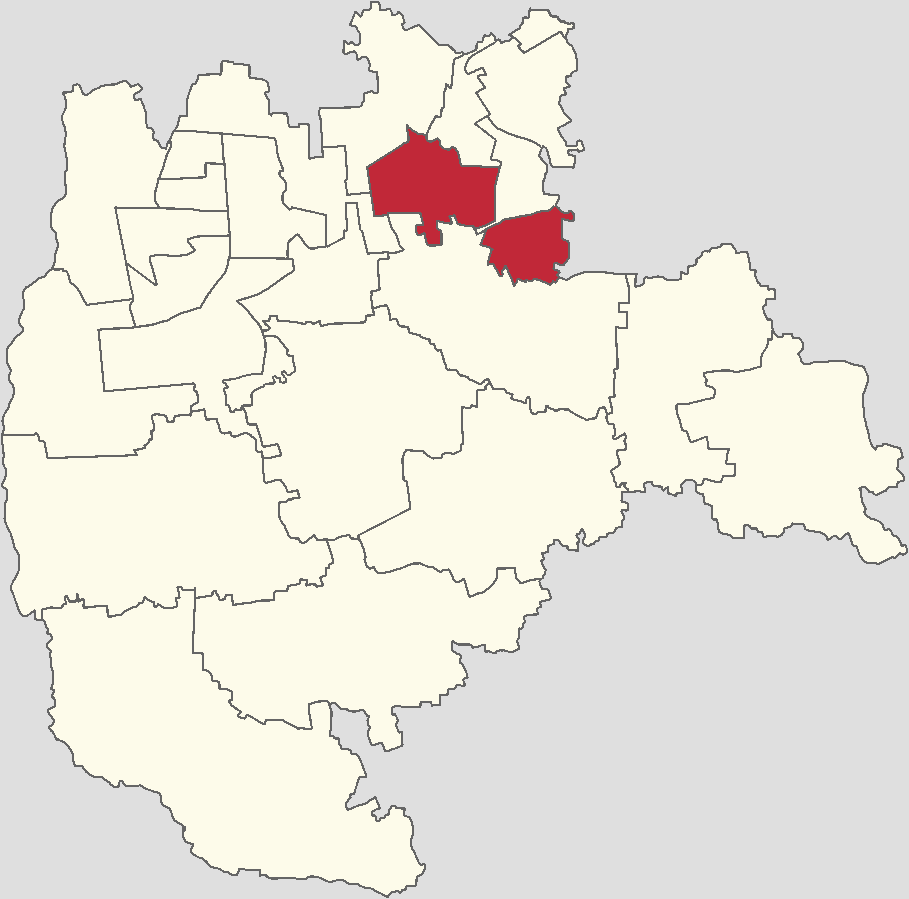
- Location of Yinghai Area within Daxing District

- Location within Beijing Location within China
- Coordinates: 39°45′41″N 116°26′35″E
- Country: China
- Municipality: Beijing
- District: Daxing
- Village-level Divisions: 19 communities 1 industrial area

Area
  - Total: 18.38 km^{2} (7.10 sq mi)
- Elevation: 37 m (121 ft)

Population (2020)
  - Total: 102,463
  - Density: 5,575/km^{2} (14,440/sq mi)
- Time zone: UTC+8 (China Standard)
- Postal code: 102676
- Area code: 010

Yinghai Area (simplified Chinese: 瀛海地区; traditional Chinese: 瀛海地區; pinyin: Yínghǎi Dìqū), or Yinghai Town, is an area and a town of Daxing District, Beijing, located between the 5th and 6th Ring Roads. As of 2020, it has 102,463 inhabitants under its administration.

In 1902, Qing government established wasteland cultivation program within the region. The settlement here was named Yinghaizhuang, and it was taken from a combination of Yingzhou, the place where settlers came from; and Haizili, the name of this region at the time. Later it was shorten to Yinghai.

== History ==
Timeline of Yinghai Area
Year	Status	Part of
1946 - 1952		23rd District, Peiping
1952 - 1956		Nanyuan District, Beijing
1956 - 1958	Hongxing Collective Farm	Nanyuan District, Beijing
1958 - 1972	Yinghai Production Team, within Hongxing People's Commune	Daxing County
1972 - 1984	Yinghai Branch of Guoying Farm	Daxing County
1984 - 2000	Yinghai Township	Daxing County
2000 - 2001	Yinghai Town (Incorporated Taihe Township in 2000)	Daxing County
2001 - 2007	Yinghai Town (Incorporated Taihe Township in 2000)	Daxing District
2007–present	Yinghai Area (Yinghai Town)	Daxing District

== Administrative divisions ==
At the end of 2021, Yinghai Area consisted of 20 subdivisions, in which 19 were residential communities, and 1 was an industrial area:

Administrative division code	Subdivision names	Name transliteration	Type
110115008001	兴海园	Xinghaiyuan	Community
110115008002	南海家园一里	Nanhai Jiayuan Yili	Community
110115008003	南海家园二里	Nanhai Jiayuan Erli	Community
110115008004	南海家园三里	Nanhai Jiayuan Sanlii	Community
110115008005	南海家园四里	Nanhai Jiayuan Sili	Community
110115008006	南海家园五里	Nanhai Jiayuan Wuli	Community
110115008007	南海家园六里	Nanhai Jiayuan Liuli	Community
110115008008	南海家园七里	Nanhai Jiayuan Qili	Community
110115008009	鹿海园五里	Luhaiyuan Wuli	Community
110115008010	瀛海家园一里	Yinghai Jiayuan Yili	Community
110115008011	瀛海家园二里	Yinghai Jiayuan Erli	Community
110115008012	金茂悦	Jinmaoyue	Community
110115008013	三槐家园	Sanhuai Jiayuan	Community
110115008014	永旭嘉园	Yongxu Jiayuan	Community
110115008015	海梓嘉园	Haizi Jiayuan	Community
110115008016	金域东郡	Jinyu Dongjun	Community
110115008017	兴悦家园	Xingyue Jiayuan	Community
110115008018	瀛海朗苑	Yinghai Langyuan	Community
110115008019	金茂嘉园	Jinmao Jiayuan	Community
110115008401	瀛海镇	Yinghaizhen	Industrial Area

== See also ==
- List of township-level divisions of Beijing
