= Yongshun, Beijing =

Yongshun Town 永顺镇
- Town
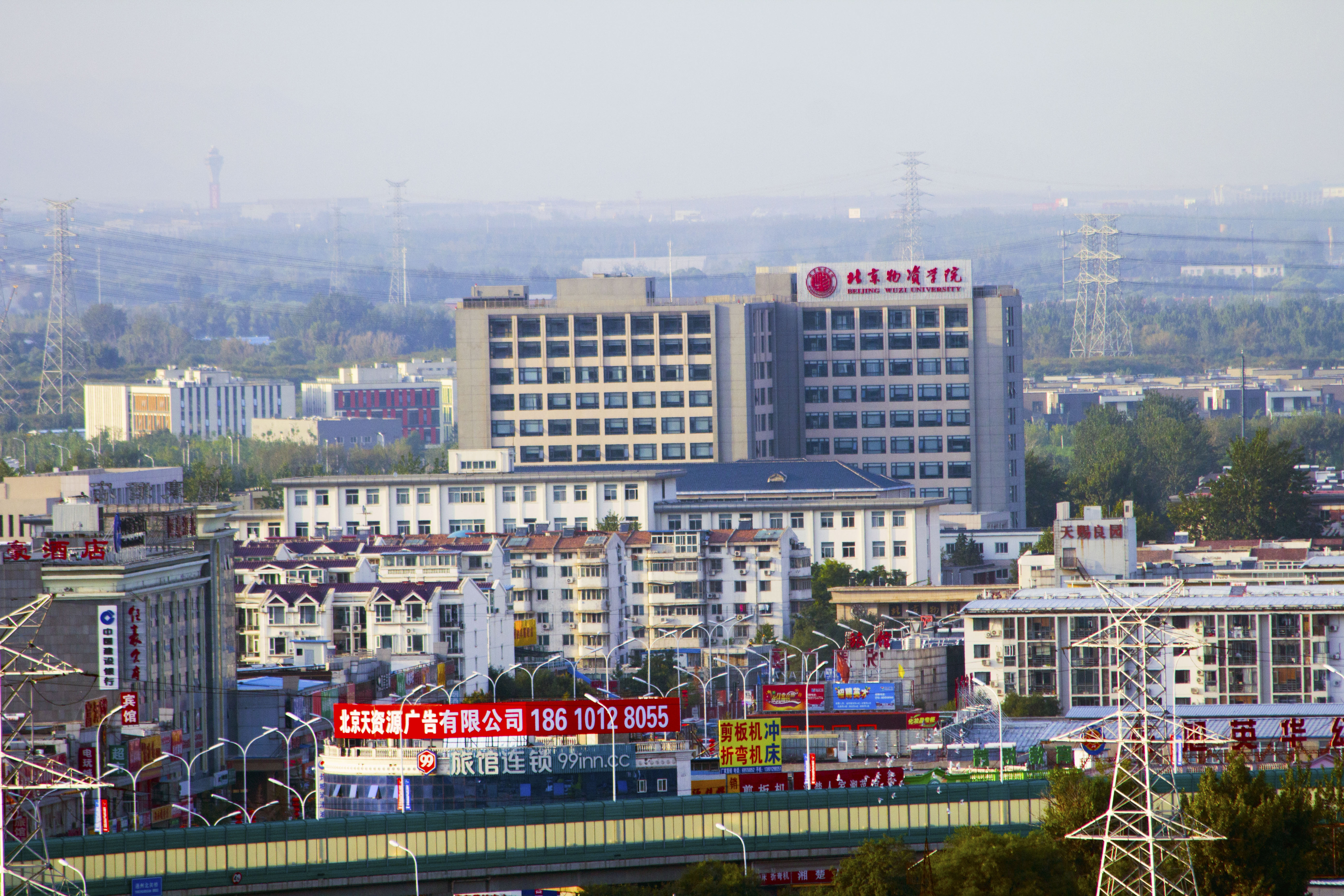
- Beijing Wuzi University within the town, 2014

- Location within Beijing Location within China
- Coordinates: 39°54′47″N 116°38′45″E
- Country: China
- Municipality: Beijing
- District: Tongzhou
- Village-level Divisions: 13 communities 21 villages

Area
  - Total: 43 km^{2} (17 sq mi)
- Elevation: 26 m (85 ft)

Population (2020)
  - Total: 304,781
  - Density: 7,100/km^{2} (18,000/sq mi)
- Time zone: UTC+8 (China Standard)
- Postal code: 101100
- Area code: 010

Yongshun Town (simplified Chinese: 永顺地区; traditional Chinese: 永順地區; pinyin: Yǒngshùn Dìqū) is a Town situated in Tongzhou District, Beijing. It borders Jinzhan Township and Songzhuang Town to its north, Luyi and Xinhua Subdistricts to its east, Beiyuan Subdistrict to its south, Guanzhuang and Changying Townships to its west, and has an exclave south of Luyuan Subdistrict. As of 2020, it had a population of 304,781 under its administration.

The town gets its name from Yongshun (Chinese: 永顺; lit. 'Eternally Successful') Village that preceded it.

== History ==
Timetable of Yongshun Town
Year	Status	Part of
1949 – 1958	Tongzhou Town	Tong County
1958 – 1965	Tongzhou Town People's Commune	Tong County
1965 – 1983	Chengguan People's Commune	Tong County
1983 – 1990	Chengguan Township	Tong County
1990 – 1997	Chengguan Town	Tong County
1997 – 2000	Yongshun Area	Tongzhou District
2000 – 2020	Yongshun Area (Yongshun Town)	Tongzhou District
2020–present	Yongshun Town	Tongzhou District

== Administrative divisions ==
At the end of 2021, Yongshun Town was made up of 34 subdivisions, consisted of 13 communities and 21 villages:

Administrative division code	Subdivision names	Name transliteration	Type
110112120001	天赐良园	Tianci Liangyuan	Community
110112120002	富河园	Fuheyuan	Community
110112120010	西马庄	Ximazhuang	Community
110112120013	永顺南里	Yongshun Nanli	Community
110112120015	永顺西里	Yongshun Xili	Community
110112120019	竹木场	Zhumuchang	Community
110112120020	杨富店	Yangfudian	Community
110112120021	岳庄	Yuezhuang	Community
110112120023	西潞苑北区	Xiluyuan Beiqu	Community
110112120026	悦澜家园	Yuelan Jiayuan	Community
110112120028	惠兰美居	Huimei Lanju	Community
110112120029	榆东一街	Yudong Yijie	Community
110112120031	永顺东里	Yongshun Dongli	Community
110112120201	永顺村	Yongshun Cun	Village
110112120202	北马庄	Beimazhuang	Village
110112120203	范庄	Fanzhuang	Village
110112120204	刘庄	Liuzhuang	Village
110112120205	李庄村	Lizhuang Cun	Village
110112120206	焦王庄	Jiaowangzhuang	Village
110112120207	苏坨	Sutuo	Village
110112120208	小潞邑	Xiaoluyi	Village
110112120209	龙旺庄	Longwangzhuang	Village
110112120210	耿庄村	Gengzhuang Cun	Village
110112120211	王家场	Wangjaichang	Village
110112120212	邓家窑	Dengjiayao	Village
110112120213	西马庄	Ximazhuang	Village
110112120215	新建村	Xinjian Cun	Village
110112120217	杨庄村	Yangzhuang Cun	Village
110112120218	果元村	Guoyuan Cun	Village
110112120219	南关	Nanguan	Village
110112120220	上营村	Shangying Cun	Village
110112120221	乔庄村	Qiaozhuang Cun	Village
110112120222	小圣庙	Xiaoshengmiao	Village
110112120223	前上坡	Qianshangpo	Village

== Economics ==
In 2018, the town's total tax revenue was 3.663 billion yuan, and the average personal income was 39.5 thousand yuan, approximately 10% increase from last year.

== Gallery ==
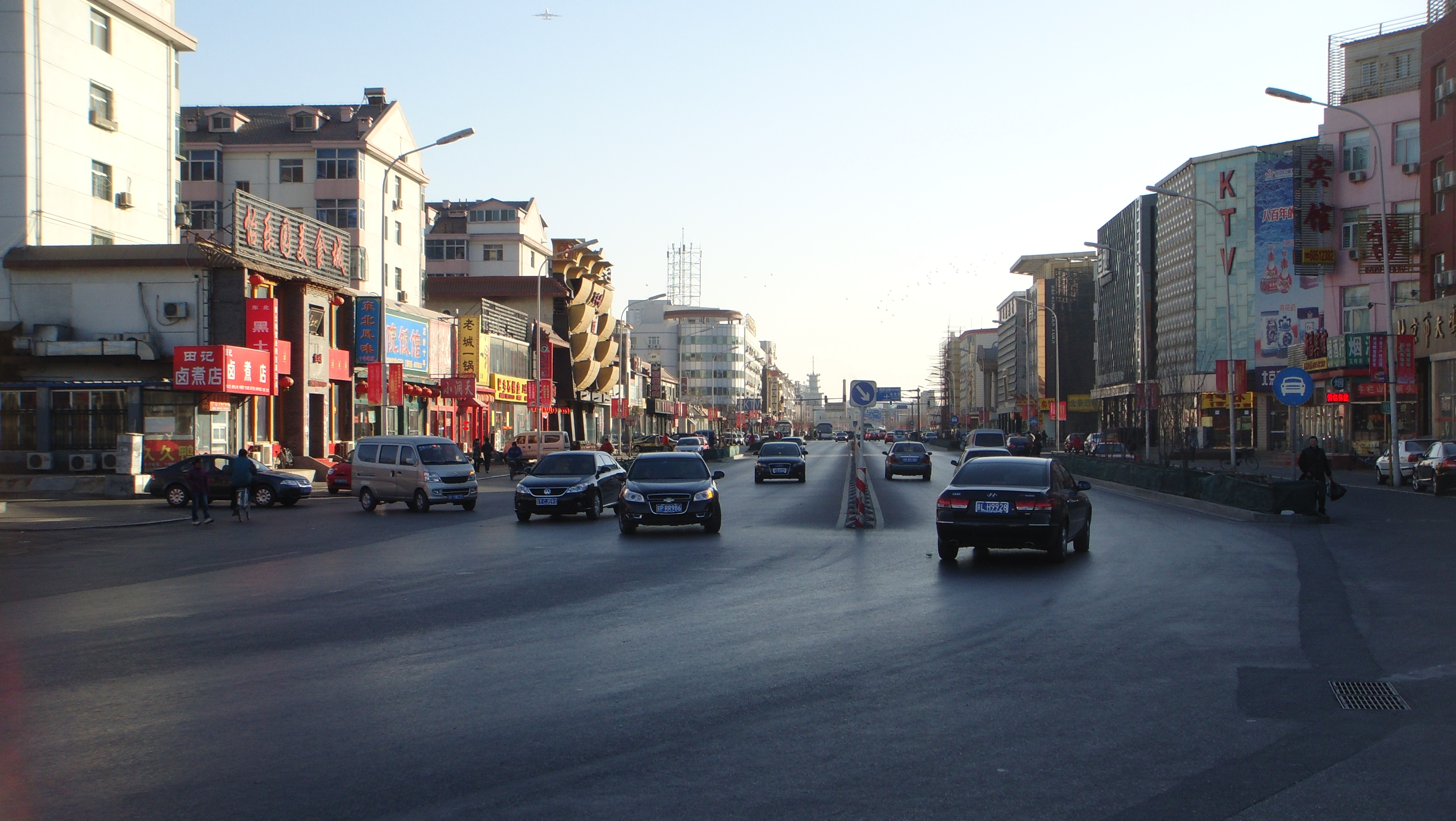
Tonghui North Road passing through west of the town, 2011

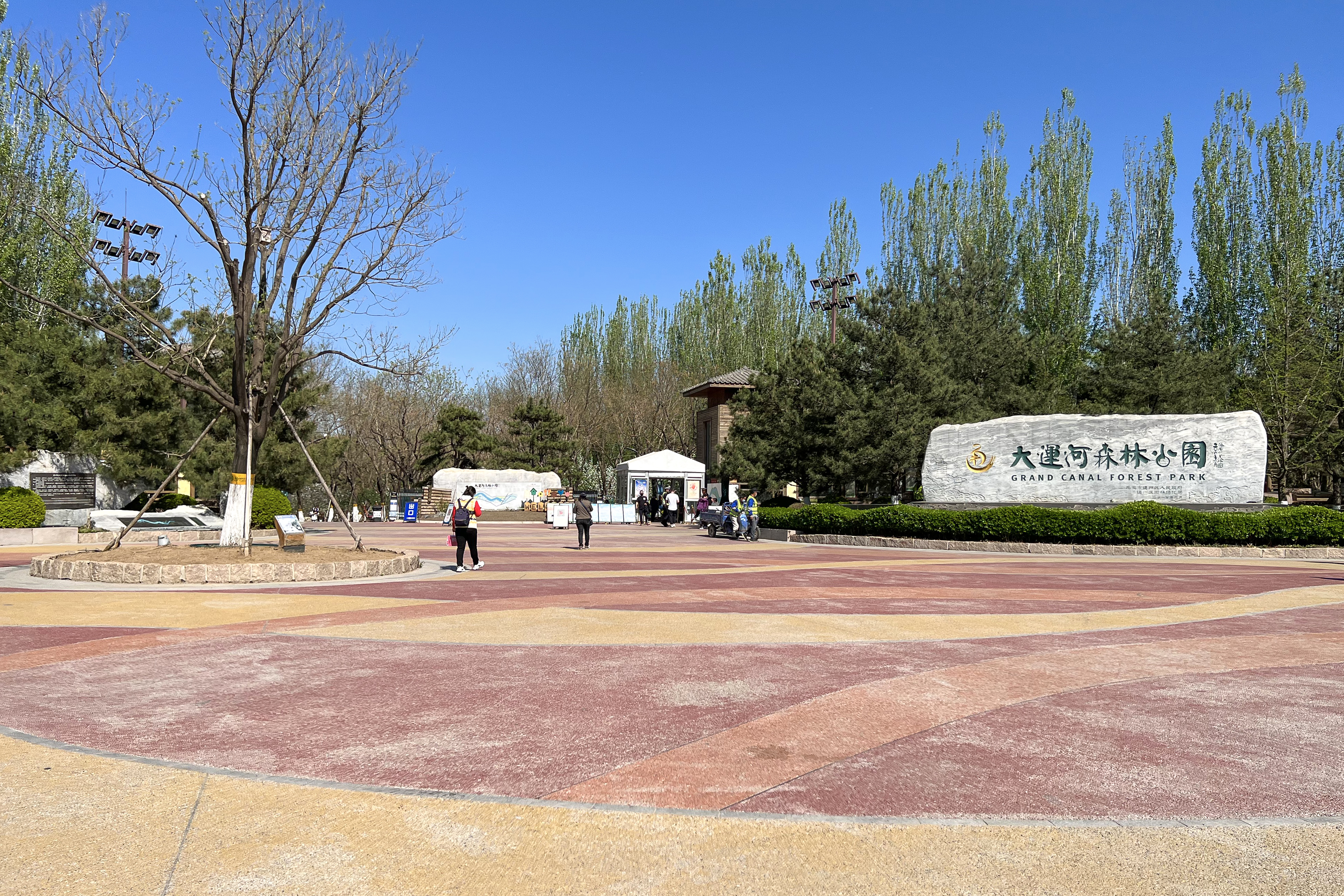
West gate of Grand Canal Forest Park, on the exclave north of Zhangjiawan, 2022

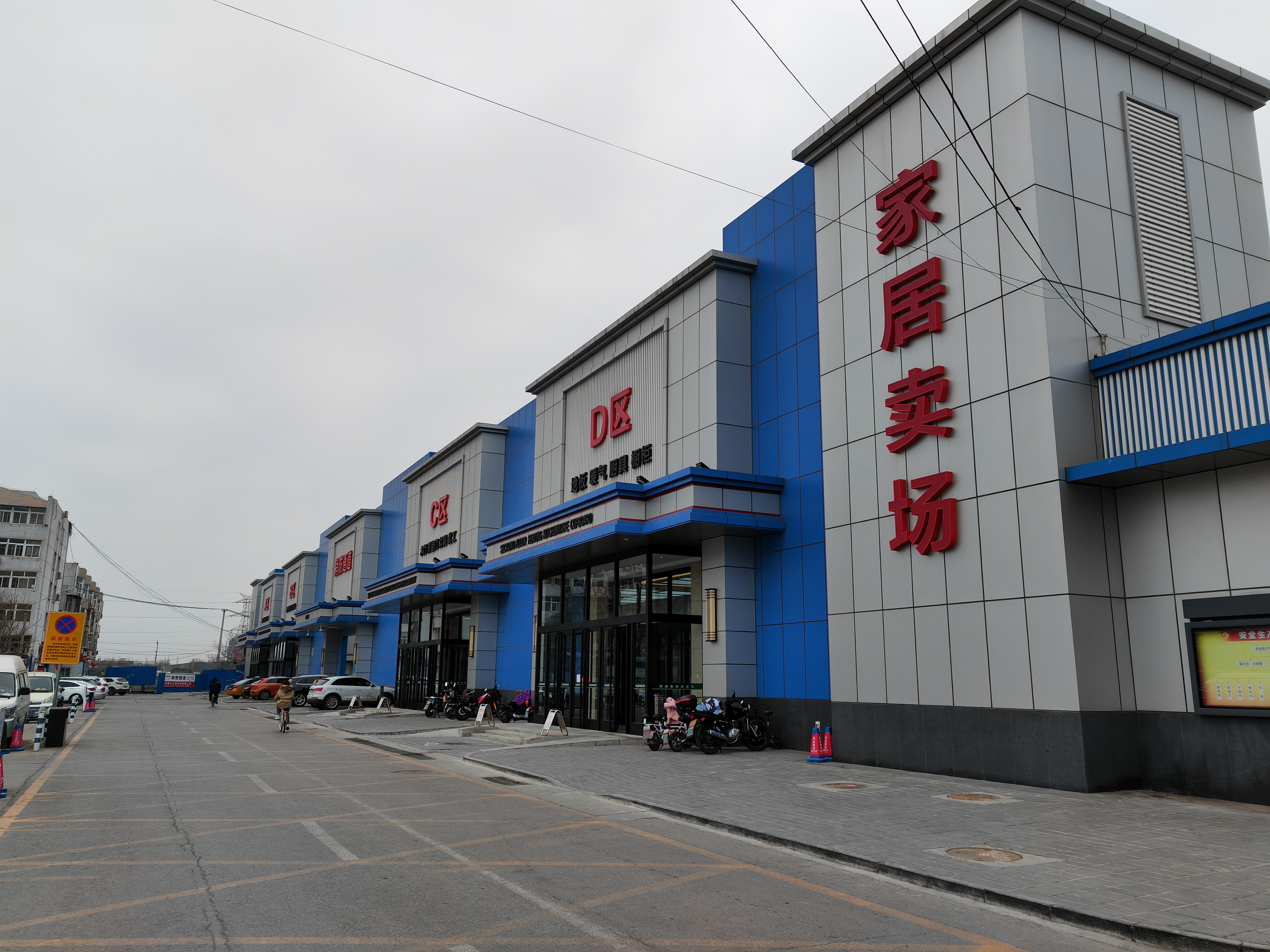
Baliqiao Market, 2022

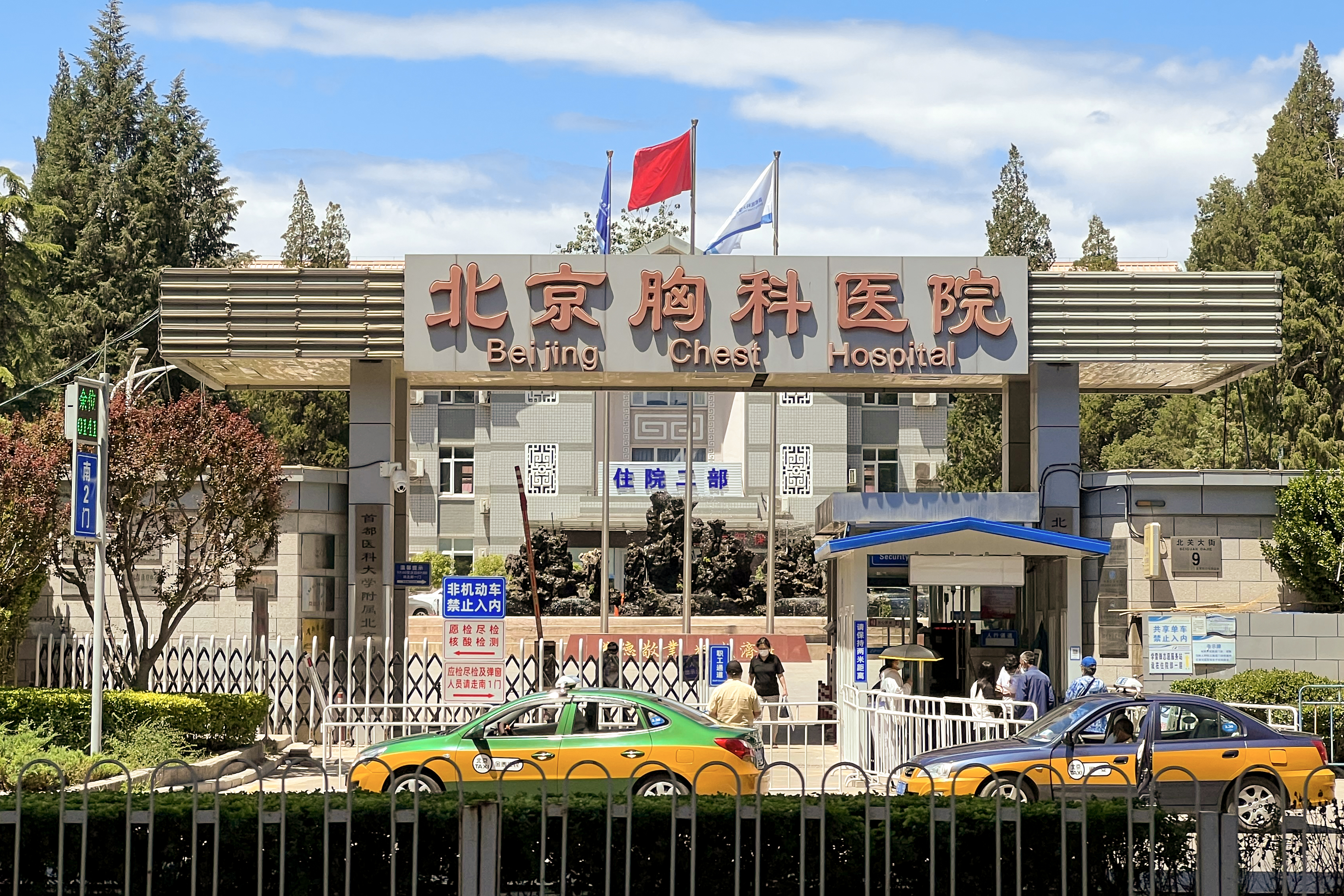
Beijing Chest Hospital, 2022

== See also ==
- List of township-level divisions of Beijing
