= Huangcun, Beijing =

Huangcun Area 黄村地区 Huangcun Town（黄村镇）
- Area & Town
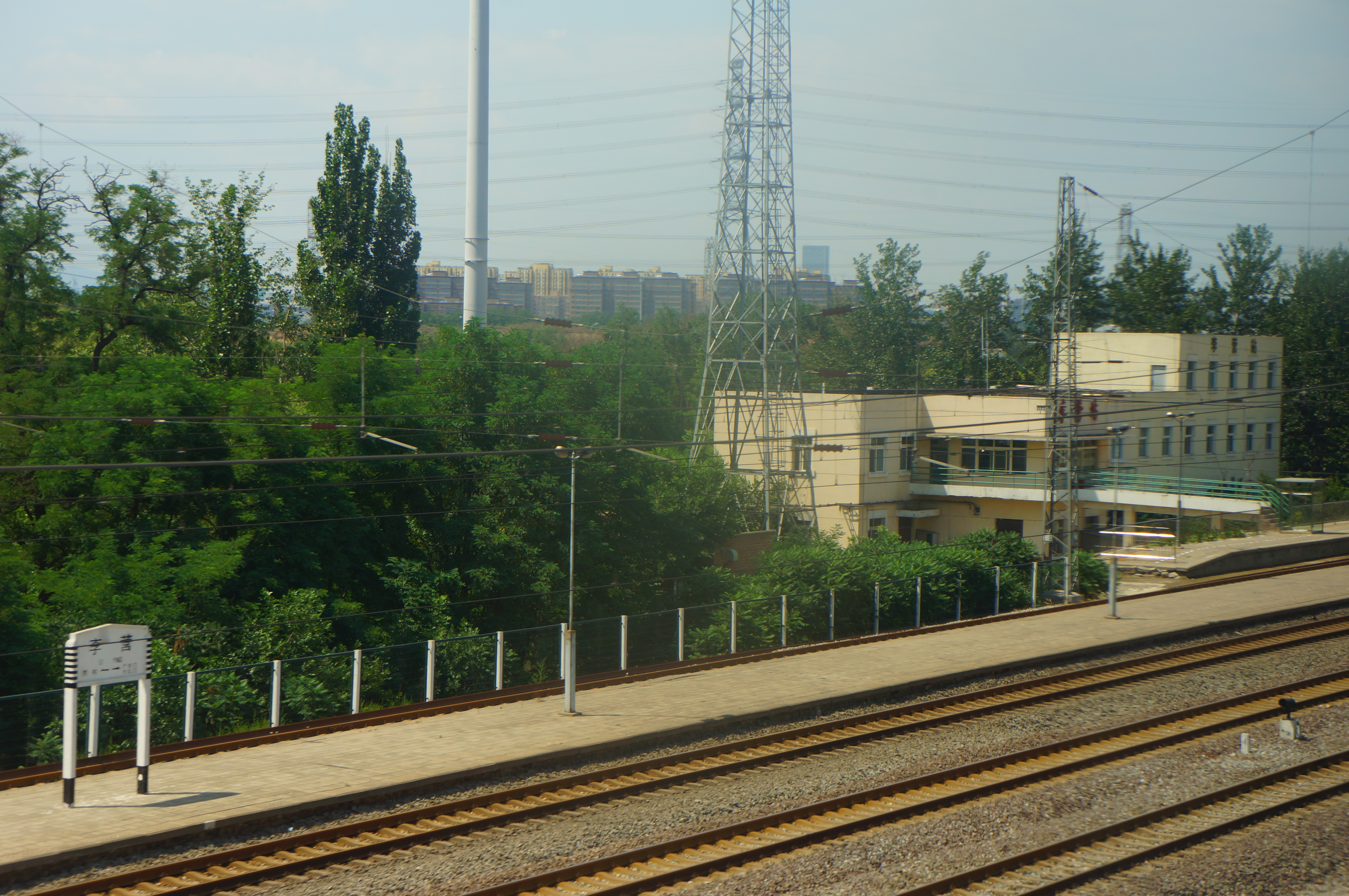
- Liying Station within the area, 2016

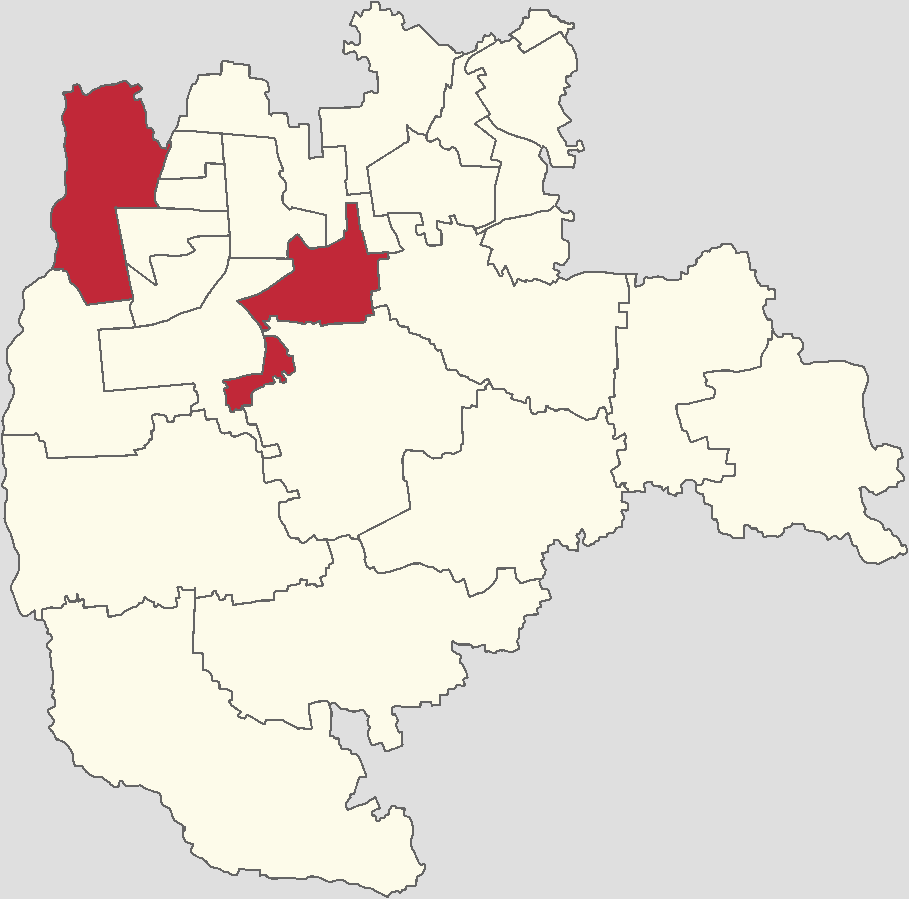
- Location within Daxing District

- Location within Beijing Location within China
- Coordinates: 39°44′29″N 116°20′02″E
- Country: China
- Municipality: Beijing
- District: Daxing
- Village-level Divisions: 11 communities 33 villages 2 industrial areas

Area
  - Total: 66.29 km^{2} (25.59 sq mi)
- Elevation: 44 m (144 ft)

Population (2020)
  - Total: 176,890
  - Density: 2,668/km^{2} (6,911/sq mi)
- Time zone: UTC+8 (China Standard)
- Postal code: 102600
- Area code: 010

Huangcun Area (simplified Chinese: 黄村地区; traditional Chinese: 黃村地區; pinyin: Huángcūn Dìqū) is an area and a town situated in the northwest corner of Daxing District, Beijing, China. Since the creation of several subdistricts in 2001 and 2009, Huangcun has remained 3 regions that are disconnected from each other. It was home to 176,890 inhabitants in the 2020 census.

During the Yuan dynasty, this region was flooded by Guyu River and formed a large desert landscape. It was named Huangcun (Chinese: 荒村; lit. 'Deserted Village') at first, and the name got corrupted to Huangcun (Chinese: 黄村; lit. 'Yellow Village') in the Qing dynasty.

== History ==
History of Huangcun Area
Year	Status	Belonged to
1958 – 1981	Huangcun People's Commune	Daxing County
1981 – 2001	Huangcun Town (Integrated Lucheng and Suncun Townships in 2000)	Daxing County
2001 – 2005	Huangcun Town (Integrated Lucheng and Suncun Townships in 2000)	Daxing District
2005–present	Huangcun Area (Huangcun Town)	Daxing District

== Administrative divisions ==
By 2021, Huangcun Area consisted of 46 subdivisions, of those 11 were residential communities, 33 were villages and 2 were industrial areas:

Administrative division code	Subdivision names	Name transliteration	Type
110115005001	长丰园一区	Changfengyuan Yiqu	Community
110115005002	明春西园	Mingchun Xiyuan	Community
110115005003	新凤	Xinfeng	Community
110115005004	长丰园三区	Changfengyuan Sanqu	Community
110115005013	金色漫香郡	Jinse Manxiangjun	Community
110115005015	新兴家园	Xinxing Jiayuan	Community
110115005016	浣溪谷	Wanxigu	Community
110115005017	格林雅苑	Gelin Yayuan	Community
110115005018	华远和煦里	Huayuan Hexuli	Community
110115005019	悦景苑	Yuejingyuan	Community
110115005020	长丰园二区	Changfengyuan Erqu	Community
110115005201	前高米店村	Qian Gaomidian Cun	Village
110115005206	西黄村	Xihuang Cun	Village
110115005210	海子角村	Haizijiao Cun	Village
110115005212	大庄村	Dazhuang Cun	Village
110115005215	前大营村	Qian Daying Cun	Village
110115005216	狼各庄西村	Langgezhuang Xicun	Village
110115005217	狼各庄东村	Langgezhuang Dongcun	Village
110115005218	西庄村	Xizhuang Cun	Village
110115005219	高家铺村	Gaojiapu Cun	Village
110115005220	狼垡一村	Langfa Yicun	Village
110115005221	狼垡二村	Langfa Ercun	Village
110115005222	狼垡三村	Langfa Sancun	Village
110115005223	狼垡四村	Langfa Sicun	Village
110115005224	立垡村	Lifa Cun	Village
110115005226	西芦城村	Xi Lucheng Cun	Village
110115005227	东芦城村	Dong Lucheng Cun	Village
110115005229	鹅房村	Efang Cun	Village
110115005232	宋庄村	Songzhuang Cun	Village
110115005233	后辛庄村	Hou Xinzhuang Cun	Village
110115005234	前辛庄村	Qian Xinzhuang Cun	Village
110115005235	太福庄村	Taifuzhuang Cun	Village
110115005236	周村	Zhoucun	Village
110115005237	刘一村	Liuyi Cun	Village
110115005238	刘二村	Liu'er Cun	Village
110115005239	三间房村	Sanjanfang Cun	Village
110115005240	辛店村	Xindian Cun	Village
110115005241	霍村	Huocun	Village
110115005242	邢各庄村	Xinggezhuang Cun	Village
110115005245	王立庄村	Wanglizhuang Cun	Village
110115005246	桂村	Guicun	Village
110115005247	李村	Licun	Village
110115005248	孙村	Suncun	Village
110115005251	郭上坡村	Guoshangpo Cun	Village
110115005401	孙村	Suncun	Industrial Area
110115005402	芦城	Lucheng	Industrial Area

== Gallery ==
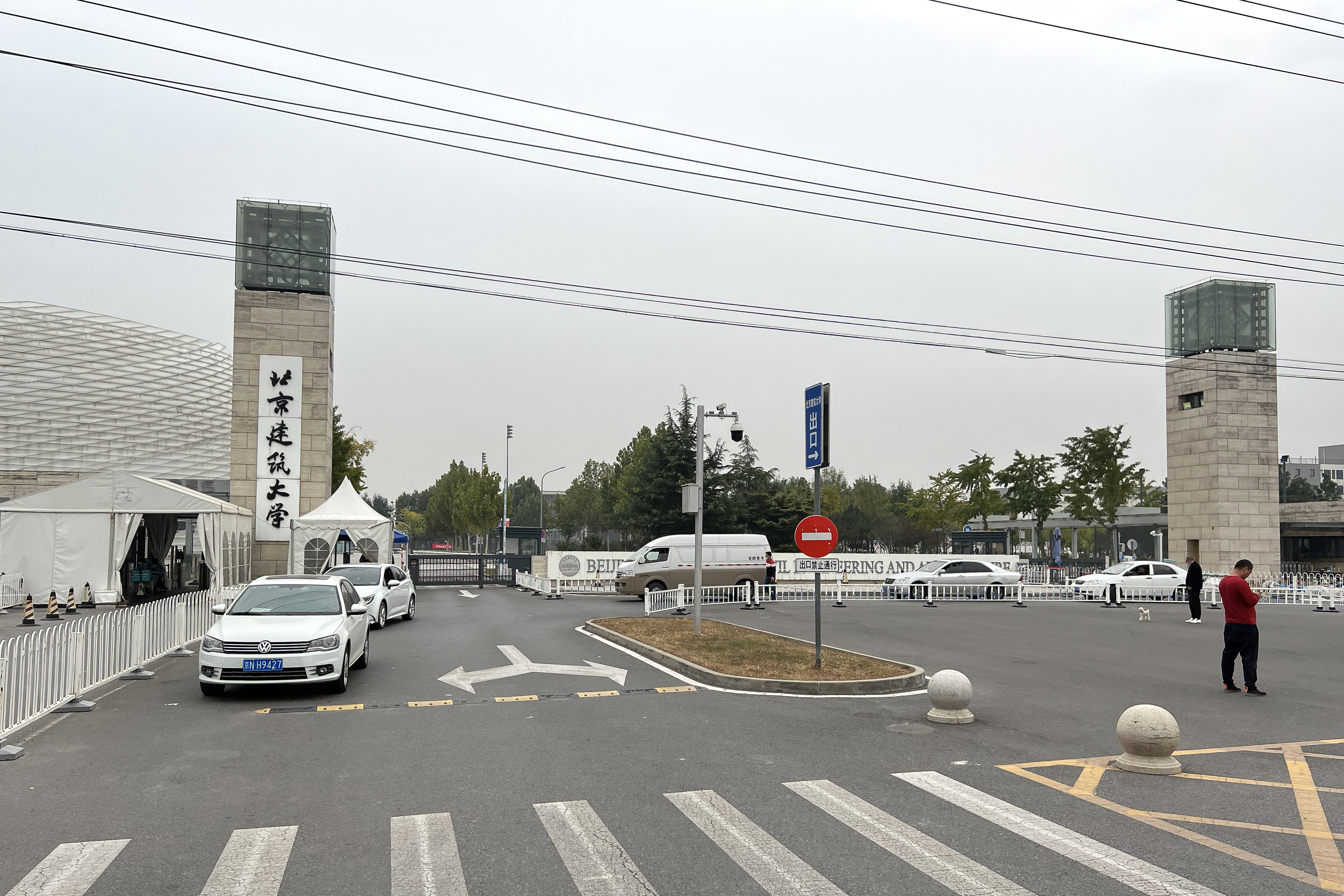
Daxing Campus of Beijing University of Civil Engineering and Architecture, 2022

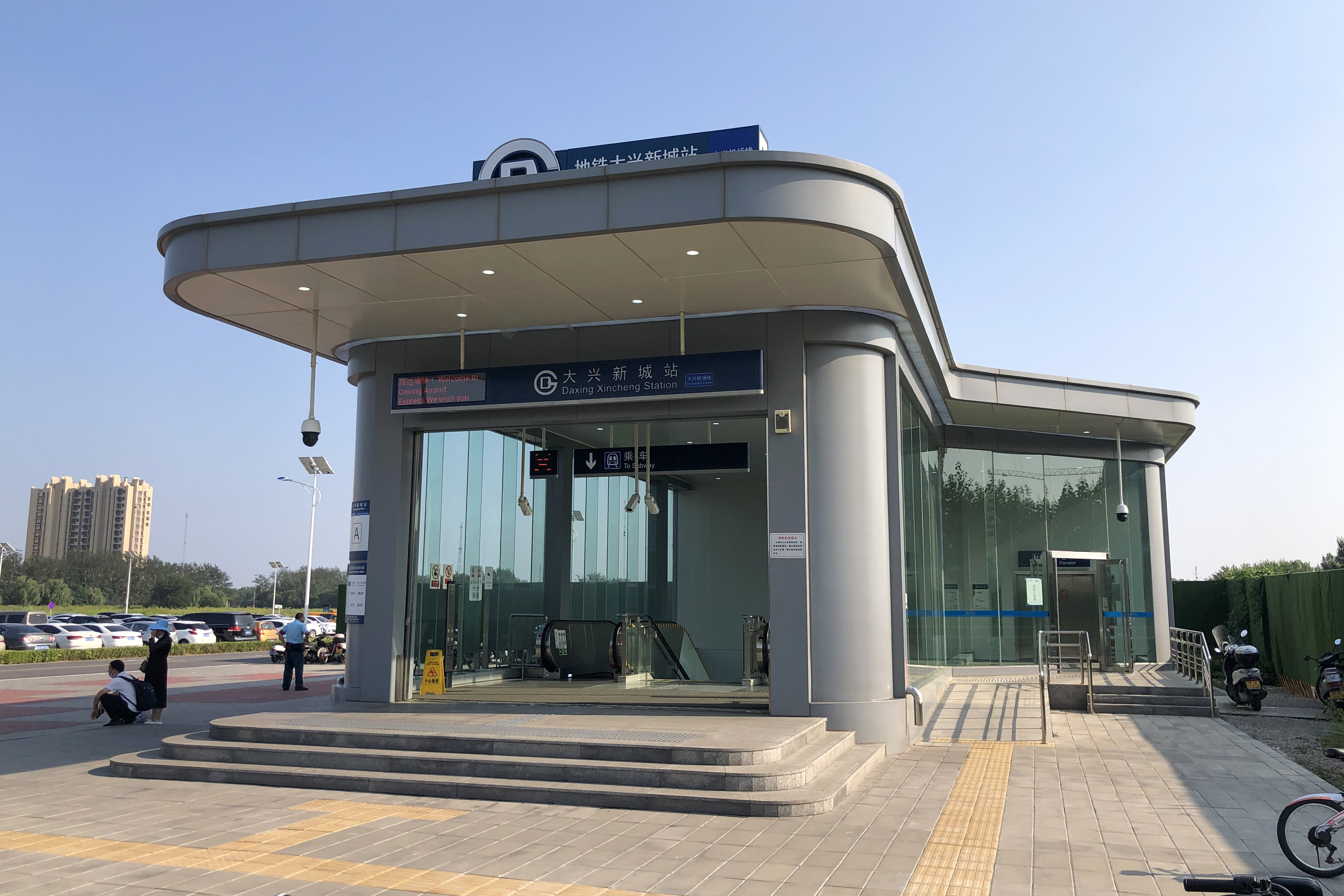
Daxing Xincheng Station, 2021

== See also ==
- List of township-level divisions of Beijing
