= Jiugong =

Jiugong Area 旧宫地区 Jiugong Town（旧宫镇）
- Area & Town
- Nanhaizi Country Park, 2011

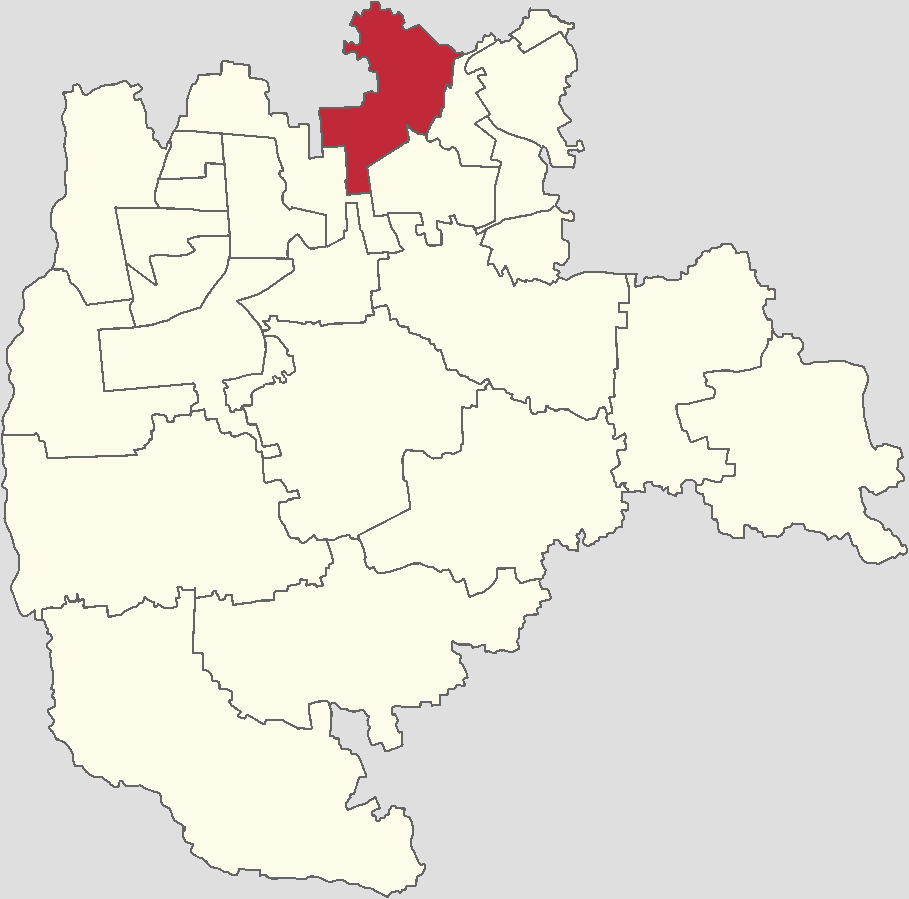
- Location within Daxing District

- Location within Beijing Location within China
- Coordinates: 39°48′40″N 116°25′51″E
- Country: China
- Municipality: Beijing
- District: Daxing
- Village-level Divisions: 28 communities 2 industrial areas

Area
  - Total: 29.32 km^{2} (11.32 sq mi)
- Elevation: 36 m (118 ft)

Population (2020)
  - Total: 189,300
  - Density: 6,456/km^{2} (16,720/sq mi)
- Time zone: UTC+8 (China Standard)
- Postal code: 102600
- Area code: 010

Jiugong (simplified Chinese: 旧宫地区; traditional Chinese: 舊宮地區; pinyin: Jiùgōng Dìqū; lit. 'old palace') is an area in northern Daxing District, Beijing, located just inside the 5th Ring Road. It borders Huaxiang and Nanyuan Subdistircts to its north and west, Xiaohongmen and Yizhuang Towns to its east, as well as Yinghai and Xihongmen Towns to its south. As of 2020, it had a population of 189,300 under its administration.

During the Ming and Qing dynasties, this area hosted a palace that served as temporary adobe for the emperor. After the fall of Qing dynasty, the palace was destroyed by armies of the Fengtian clique. The region was given the name Jiugong (Chinese: 旧宫; lit. 'Old Palace') as a result.

== History ==
From 1913 to 1949, it was part of Daxing County, and after the establishment of the People's Republic transferred to Nanyuan District, then established as a township in 1953; five years later Jiugong Township was returned to Daxing County but under the guise of Hongxing People's Commune (红星人民公社). In 1983, the commune was abolished and Jiugong was upgraded to a town in 1990.

== Administrative divisions ==
As of the year 2021, Jiugong Area consisted of 30 subdivisions, with 28 communities and 2 industrial areas:

Administrative division code	Subdivision names	Name transliteration	Type
110115006001	清逸园	Qingyiyuan	Community
110115006002	清欣园	Qingxinyuan	Community
110115006003	清和园	Qingheyuan	Community
110115006004	清乐园	Qingleyuan	Community
110115006006	红星楼	Hongxinglou	Community
110115006007	德茂	Demao	Community
110115006008	红星北里	Hongxing Beili	Community
110115006009	宣颐家园	Xuanyi Jiayuan	Community
110115006011	上林苑	Shanglinyuan	Community
110115006012	德茂楼	Demaolou	Community
110115006013	绿洲家园	Lüzhou Jiayuan	Community
110115006014	美然	Meiran	Community
110115006015	灵秀山庄	Lingxiu Shanzhuang	Community
110115006016	清逸西园	Qingyi Xiyuan	Community
110115006017	佳和园	Jiaheyuan	Community
110115006018	育龙家园	Yulong Jiayuan	Community
110115006019	幻星家园	Huanxing Jiayuan	Community
110115006020	德林园	Delinyuan	Community
110115006021	德茂佳苑	Demao Jiayuan	Community
110115006022	润星家园	Runxing Jiayuan	Community
110115006023	云龙家园	Yunlong Jiayuan	Community
110115006024	成和园	Chengheyuan	Community
110115006025	美丽新世界	Meili Xinshijie	Community
110115006026	上筑家园	Shangzhu Jiayuan	Community
110115006027	润枫锦尚	Runfeng Jinshang	Community
110115006028	盛悦居	Shengyueju	Community
110115006029	紫郡府	Zijunfu	Community
110115006031	国韵村	Guoyuncun	Community
110115006401	旧宫	Jiugong	Industrial Area
110115006402	南郊旧宫场	Nanjiao Jiugongchang	Industrial Area

== See also ==
- List of township-level divisions of Beijing
