= Heizhuanghu =

Heizhuanghu Township 黑庄户乡
- Township
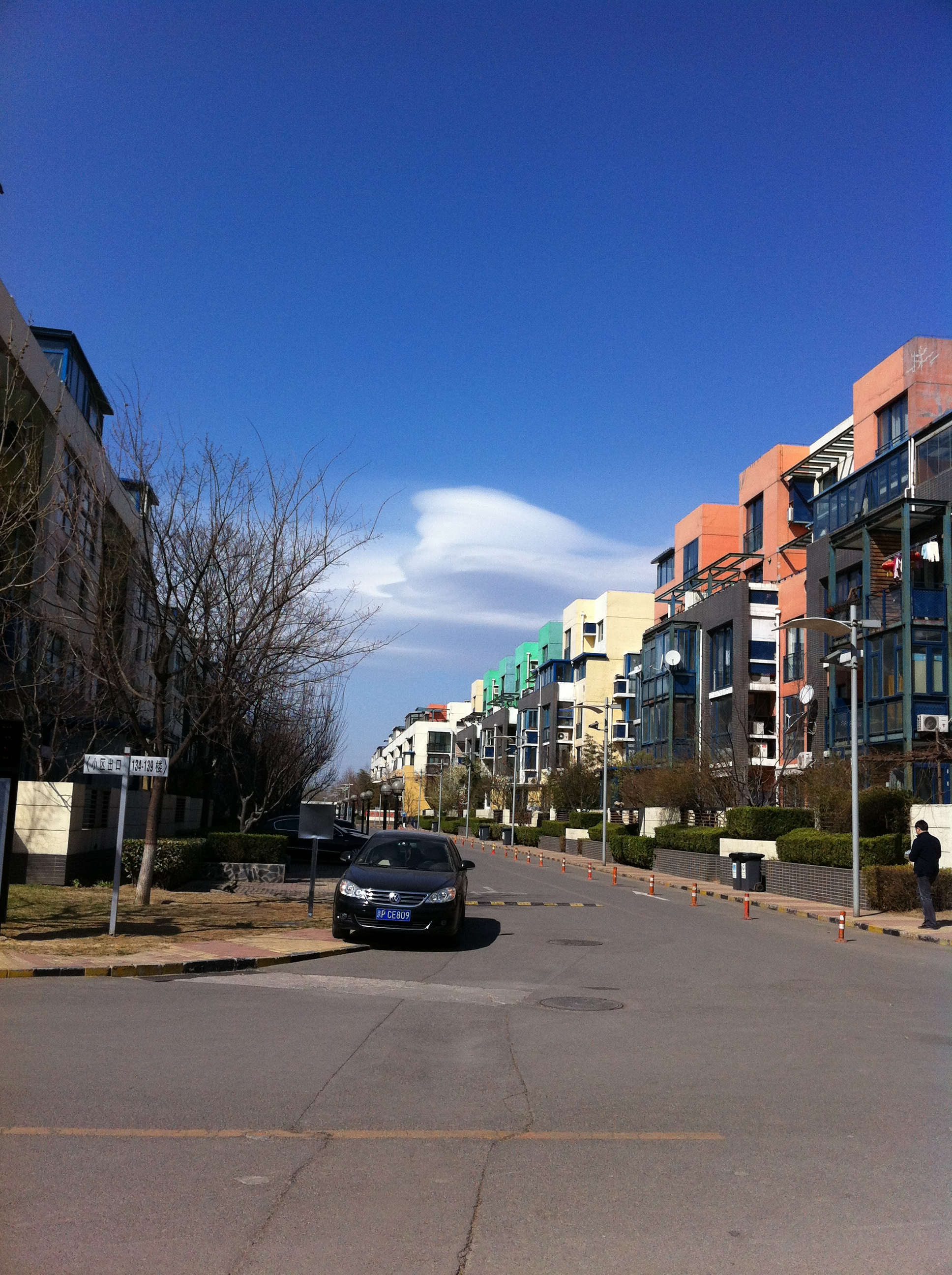
- Residential community on the center of the township, 2012

- Location within Beijing Location within China
- Coordinates: 39°51′08″N 116°35′27″E
- Country: China
- Municipality: Beijing
- District: Chaoyang
- Village-level Divisions: 7 communities 16 villages

Area
  - Total: 24.17 km^{2} (9.33 sq mi)

Population (2020)
  - Total: 49,983
  - Density: 2,068/km^{2} (5,356/sq mi)
- Time zone: UTC+8 (China Standard)
- Postal code: 100121
- Area code: 010

Heizhuanghu Township (Chinese: 黑庄户乡; pinyin: Hēizhuānghù Xiāng) is a township on the southeastern corner Chaoyang District, Beijing, China. It borders Guanzhuang Township and Beiyuan Subdistrict to the north, Liyuan Town to the east, Taihu Town to the south, Dougezhuang Township to the west. According to the 2020 census, the population of Heizhuanghu township was 49,983.

The name of Heizhuanghu (Chinese: 黑庄户; lit. 'Black Villa Residence') originates from the end of Ming dynasty, when the originally settlers of this region lived in half-underground shacks.

== History ==
Timeline of changes in the status of Heizhuanghu
Time	Status
1959	Established as Heizhuanghu Production Team, part of People's Commune of Shuangqiao
196s	Renamed to Hongzhuang Production Team, original name restored in early 1970s
1983	Reorganized into a township
1984	Part of Shuangqiao Subdistrict
2004	Became an area while retaining township status

== Administrative Divisions ==
As of 2021, Heizhuanghu has 23 subdivision under it, with 7 communities and 16 villages:

Administrative Division Code	Community Name in Simplified Chinese	Community Name in English	Type
110105040001	双桥第一	Shuangqiao Diyi	Community
110105040002	双桥第二	Shuangqiao Di'er	Community
110105040003	康城	Kangcheng	Community
110105040004	怡景城	Yijingcheng	Community
110105040005	旭园	Xuyuan	Community
110105040006	东旭	Dongxu	Community
110105040007	双桥第三	Shuangqiao Disan	Community
110105040200	大鲁店一	Daludianyi	Village
110105040201	大鲁店二	Daludian'er	Village
110105040202	大鲁店三	Daludiansan	Village
110105040203	小鲁店	Xiaoludian	Village
110105040204	郎各庄	Langgezhuang	Village
110105040205	郎辛庄	Langxinzhuang	Village
110105040206	万子营西	Wanziyingxi	Village
110105040207	万子营东	Wanziyingdong	Village
110105040208	黑庄户	Heizhuanghu	Village
110105040209	四合庄	Sihezhuang	Village
110105040210	定辛庄西	Dingxinzhuangxi	Village
110105040211	定辛庄东	Dingxinzhuangdong	Village
110105040212	双树南	Shuangshunan	Village
110105040213	双树北	Shuangshubei	Village
110105040214	苏坟	Sufen	Village
110105040215	么铺	Mepu	Village

== See also ==
- List of township-level divisions of Beijing
