= Zhangjiawan, Beijing =

Zhangjiawan Town 张家湾镇
- Town
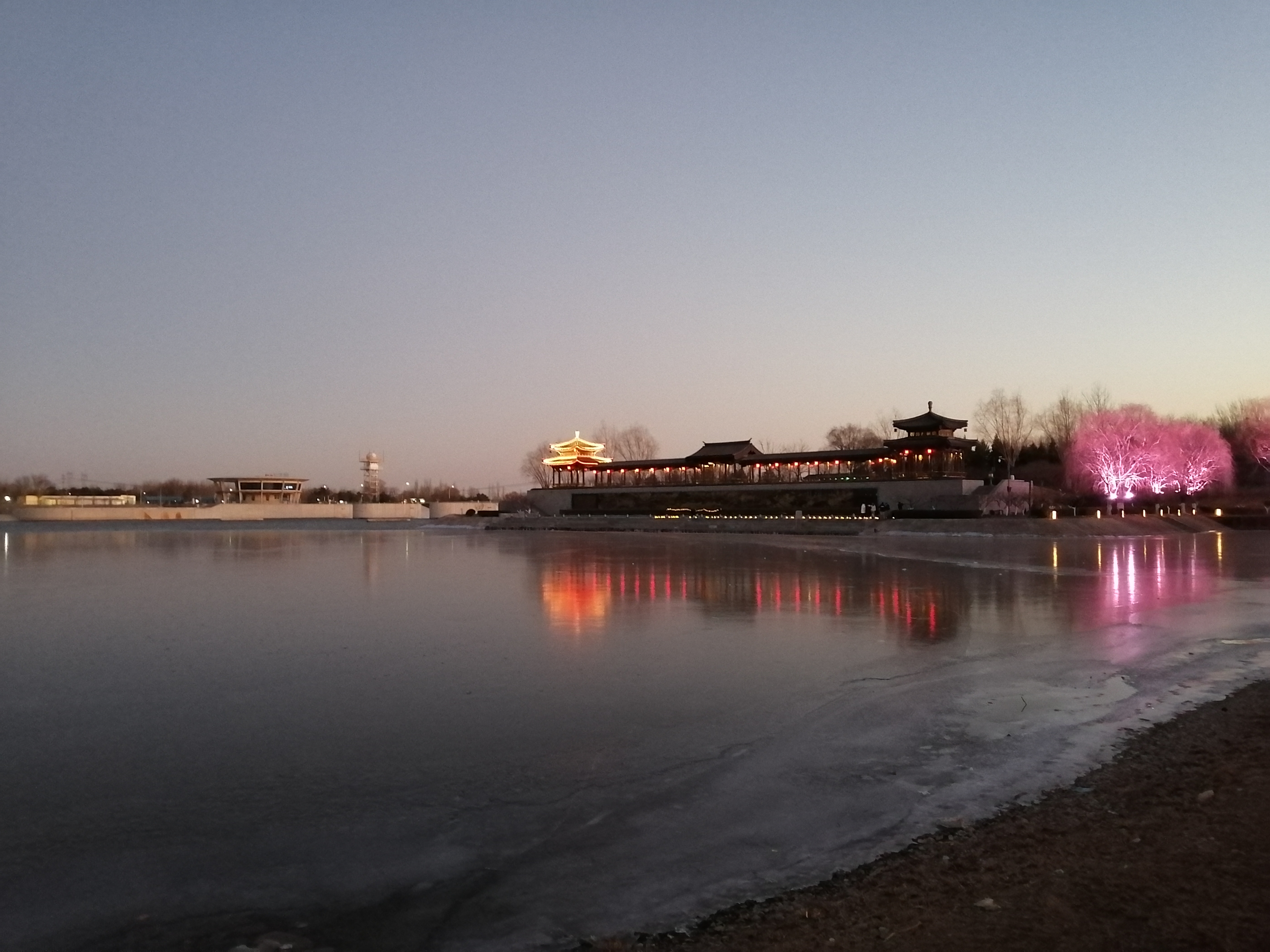
- Grand Canal Forest Park at the north of the town, 2022

- Location within Beijing Location within China
- Coordinates: 39°51′26″N 116°42′51″E
- Country: China
- Municipality: Beijing
- District: Tongzhou
- Village-level Divisions: 57 villages

Area
  - Total: 105.4 km^{2} (40.7 sq mi)

Population (2020)
  - Total: 127,992
  - Density: 1,214/km^{2} (3,145/sq mi)
- Time zone: UTC+8 (China Standard)
- Postal code: 101104
- Area code: 010

Zhangjiawan Town (Chinese: 张家湾镇; pinyin: Zhāngjiāwān Zhèn) is a town situated in the north of Tongzhou District, Beijing, China. It shares border with Linheli Subdistrict and Yongshun Town to the north, Lucheng Town to the northeast, Xiji and Kuoxian Towns to the east, Yujiawu Hui Township and Majuqiao Town to the south, Taihu, Liyuan Towns and Wenjing Subdistrict to the west. It was home to 127,992 people in 2020.

During Yuan dynasty, an official named Zhang Xuan (张瑄) was in charge of overseeing transportation through canals. He built a port on the Grand Canal southeast of Khanbaliq, and the region was later named Zhangjiawan (Chinese: 张家湾; lit. 'Zhang Family's Bay')

== History ==
Timetable of Zhangjiawan Town
Year	Status	Under
1946 – 1948	Zhangjiawan Township	Tong County
1948 – 1956	6th District	Tong County
1956 - 1958	Zhangjiawan Township Tuqiao Township	Tong County
1958 – 1972	Zhangjiawan People's Commune	Tong County
1972 – 1983	Zhangjiawan People's Commune (18 villages on the north was transferred to Liyuan People's Commune)	Tong County
1983 – 1990	Zhangjiawan Township	Tong County
1990 – 1997	Zhangjiawan Town	Tong County
1997 – 2001	Zhangjiawan Town	Tongzhou District
2001–present	Zhangjiawan Town (Integrated Niubaotun Town)	Tongzhou District

== Administration divisions ==
As of 2021, Zhangjiawan Town oversaw 57 villages:

Administrative division code	Subdivision names	Name transliteration
110112105201	北许场	Beixuchang
110112105202	张辛庄	Zhangxinzhuang
110112105203	上马头	Shang Matou
110112105204	梁各庄	Lianggezhuang
110112105205	土桥	Tuqiao
110112105206	皇木厂	Huangmuchang
110112105207	南许场	Nanxuchang
110112105208	张湾镇	Zhangwanzhen
110112105209	张湾	Zhangwan
110112105210	大高力庄	Dagaolizhuang
110112105211	上店	Shangdian
110112105212	贾各庄	Jiagezhuang
110112105213	东定福庄	Dong Dingfuzhuang
110112105214	西定福庄	Xi Dingfuzhuang
110112105215	立禅庵	Lichan'an
110112105216	宽街	Kuanjie
110112105217	唐小庄	Tangxiaozhuang
110112105218	施园	Shiyuan
110112105219	里二泗	Li'ersi
110112105220	烧酒巷	Shaojiuxiang
110112105221	瓜厂	Guachang
110112105222	马营	Maying
110112105223	何各庄	Hegezhuang
110112105224	牌楼营	Pailouying
110112105225	齐善庄	Qishanzhuang
110112105226	南姚园	Nanyaoyuan
110112105227	大辛庄	Daxinzhuang
110112105228	枣林庄	Zaolinzhuang
110112105229	姚辛庄	Yaoxinzhuang
110112105230	中街	Zhongjie
110112105231	前街	Qianjie
110112105232	后街	Houjie
110112105233	苍头	Cangtou
110112105234	十里庄	Shilizhuang
110112105235	南火垡	Nanhuofa
110112105236	三间房	Sanjianfang
110112105237	样田	Yangtian
110112105238	垡头	Fatou
110112105239	陆辛庄	Luxinzhuang
110112105240	北大化	Bei Dahua
110112105241	大北关	Da Beiguan
110112105242	小北关	Xiao Beiguan
110112105243	南大化	Nan Dahua
110112105244	柳营	Liuying
110112105245	高营	Gaoying
110112105246	坨堤	Tuodi
110112105247	西永和屯	Xi Yonghetun
110112105248	东永和屯	Dong Yonghetun
110112105249	王各庄	Wanggezhuang
110112105250	苍上	Cangshang
110112105251	后坨	Houtuo
110112105252	后青山	Hou Qingshan
110112105253	前青山	Qian Qingshan
110112105254	后南关	Hou Nanguan
110112105255	前南关	Qian Nanguan
110112105256	北仪阁	Beiyige
110112105257	小耕垡	Xiaogengfa

== See also ==
- List of township-level divisions of Beijing
