= Sanjianfang =

Sanjianfang Township 三间房乡
- Township
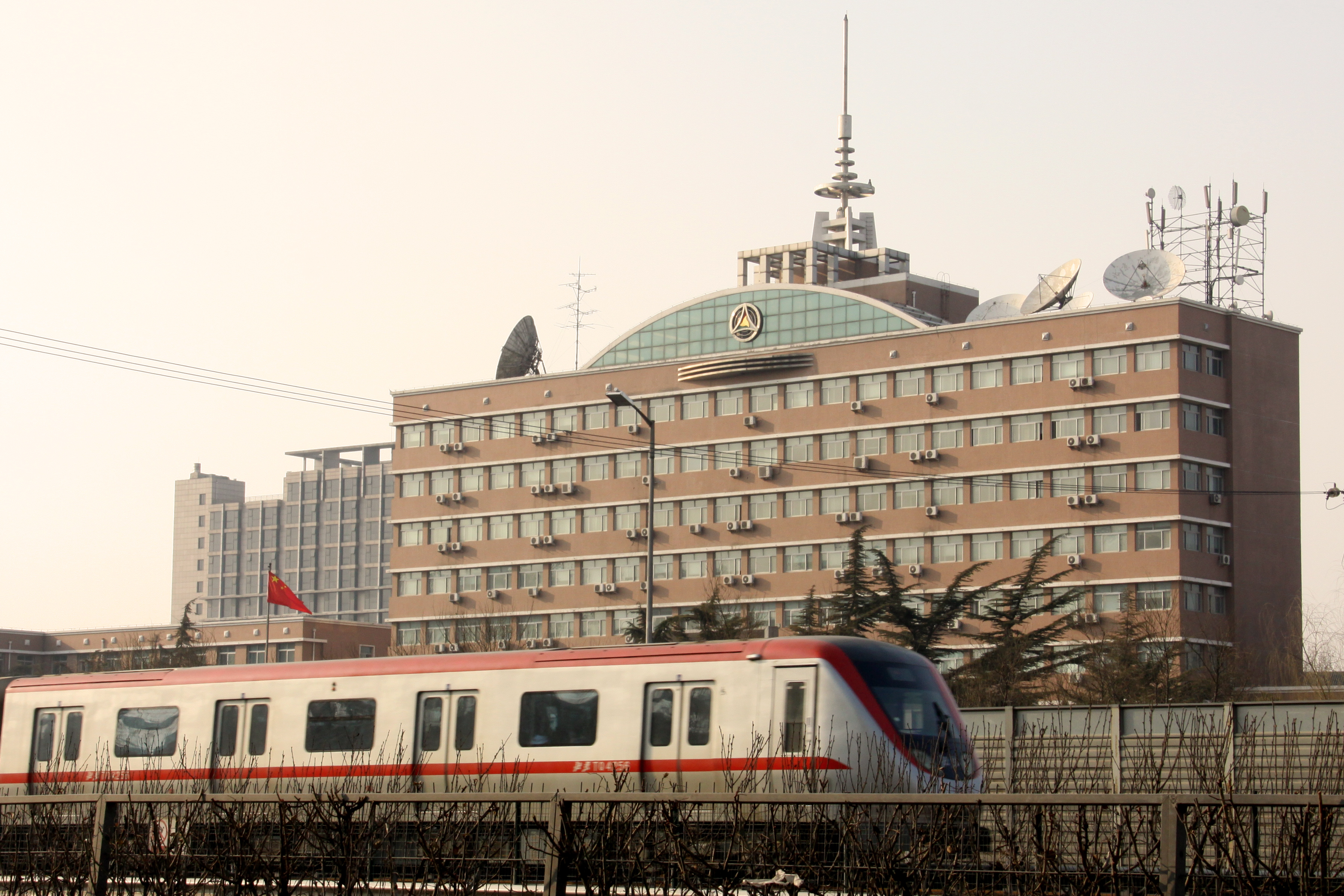
- Communication University of China within the township, 2012

- Location within Beijing Location within China
- Coordinates: 39°54′25″N 116°34′29″E
- Country: China
- Municipality: Beijing
- District: Chaoyang
- Village-level Divisions: 15 communities 11 villages

Area
  - Total: 8.8 km^{2} (3.4 sq mi)

Population (2020)
  - Total: 109,672
  - Density: 12,000/km^{2} (32,000/sq mi)
- Time zone: UTC+8 (China Standard)
- Postal code: 100024
- Area code: 010

Sanjianfang Township (Chinese: 三间房乡; pinyin: Sānjiānfáng Xiāng) is a township in the eastern Chaoyang District and around the 5th Ring Road of Beijing, China. It borders Pingfang and Changying Townships to the north, Guanzhuang Township to the east, Dougezhuang Township to the south, and Gaobeidian Township to the west. It has a population of 109,672 according to the 2020 Chinese census.

The name Sanjianfang (Chinese: 三间房; lit. 'Three Houses') is derived from Sanjiafang (Chinese: 三家坊; lit. 'Three Families Workshops'), which were a collection of prominent workshops and markets within the area around the end of Ming dynasty.

== History ==
History of status of Sanjianfang Township
Year	Status
1949	Part of Daxing County and the 8th District of Tong County
1958	Part of People's Commune of Shuangqiao, Chaoyang District
1971	Established as Sanjianfang Production Team
1984	Reorganized into a township
2003	Became an area while retaining township status

== Administrative Divisions ==
In 2021, the township is divided into 26 subdivisions, including 15 communities and 11 villages:

Administrative Division Code	Community Name in English	Community Name in Simplified Chinese	Type
110105034001	Fuyiyuan	福怡苑	Community
110105034003	Sanjianfang Nanli	三间房南里	Community
110105034004	Dingnanli	定南里	Community
110105034005	Dingbeili	定北里	Community
110105034006	Dingxi Beili	定西北里	Community
110105034007	Dingxi Nanli	定西南里	Community
110105034008	Shuangqiao Tielu	双桥铁路	Community
110105034009	Shuangqiaolu	双桥路	Community
110105034010	Shuangliu	双柳	Community
110105034013	Shuanghuiyuan	双惠苑	Community
110105034014	Lüzhou Jiayuan	绿洲家园	Community
110105034015	Yishui Fangyuan	艺水芳园	Community
110105034016	Meirang Dongli	美然动力	Community
110105034026	Jufuyuan	聚福苑	Community
110105034027	Taifuyuan	泰福苑	Community
110105034200	Sanjianfang Dongcun	三间房东村	Village
110105034201	Sanjianfang Xicun	三间房西村	Village
110105034202	Dingfuzhuang Dongcun	定福庄东村	Village
110105034203	Dingfuzhuang Xicun	定福庄西村	Village
110105034204	Dalianpocun	褡裢坡村	Village
110105034205	Baijialoucun	白家楼村	Village
110105034207	Dongliucun	东柳村	Village
110105034208	Xiliucun	西柳村	Village
110105034209	Xinfangcun	新房村	Village
110105034210	Beishuangqiaocun	北双桥村	Village
110105034211	Jinjiacun	金家村	Village

== Gallery ==
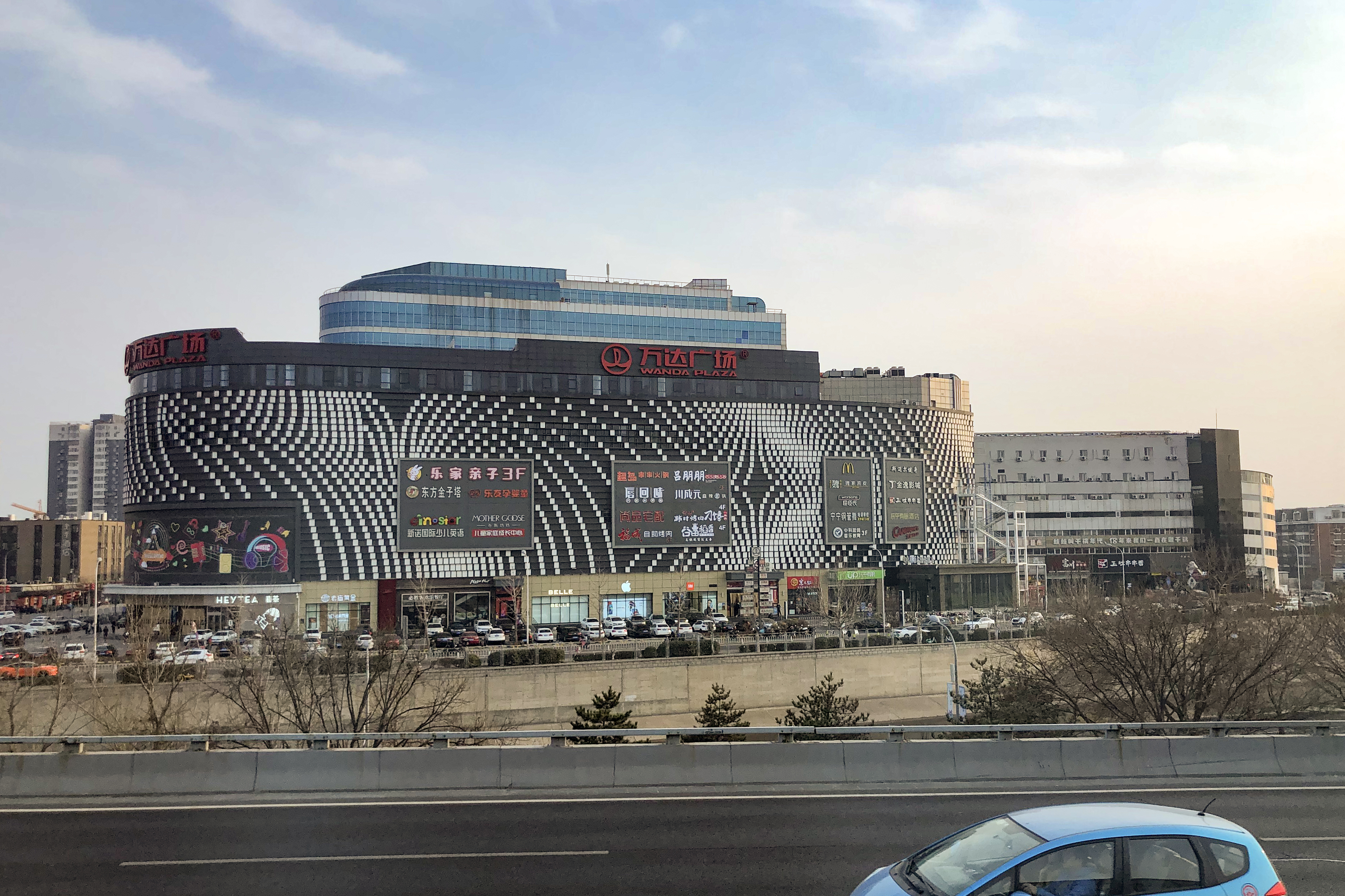
Beijing Shuangqiao Wanda Plaza, 2021

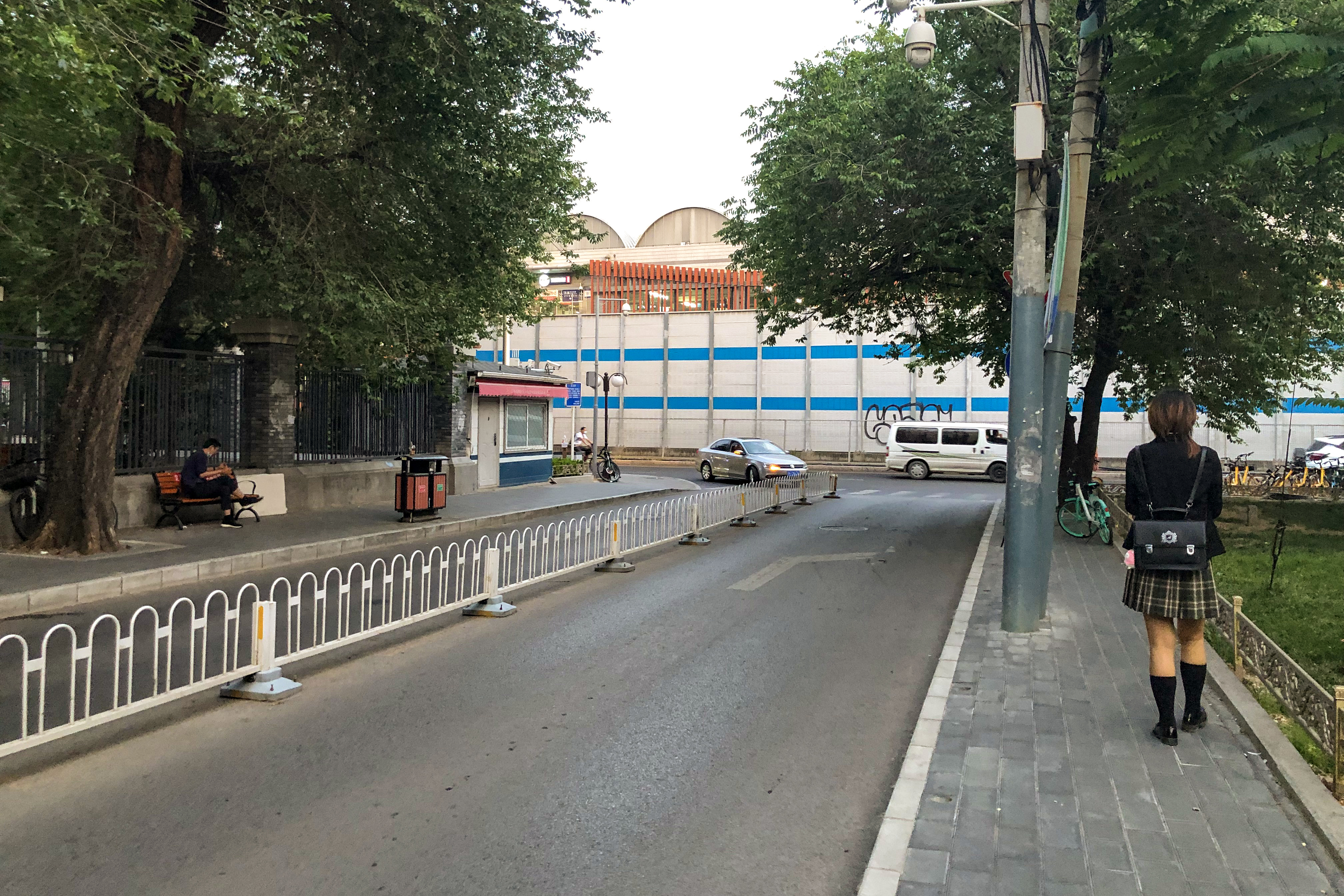
Dingfuzhuang East Street, 2021

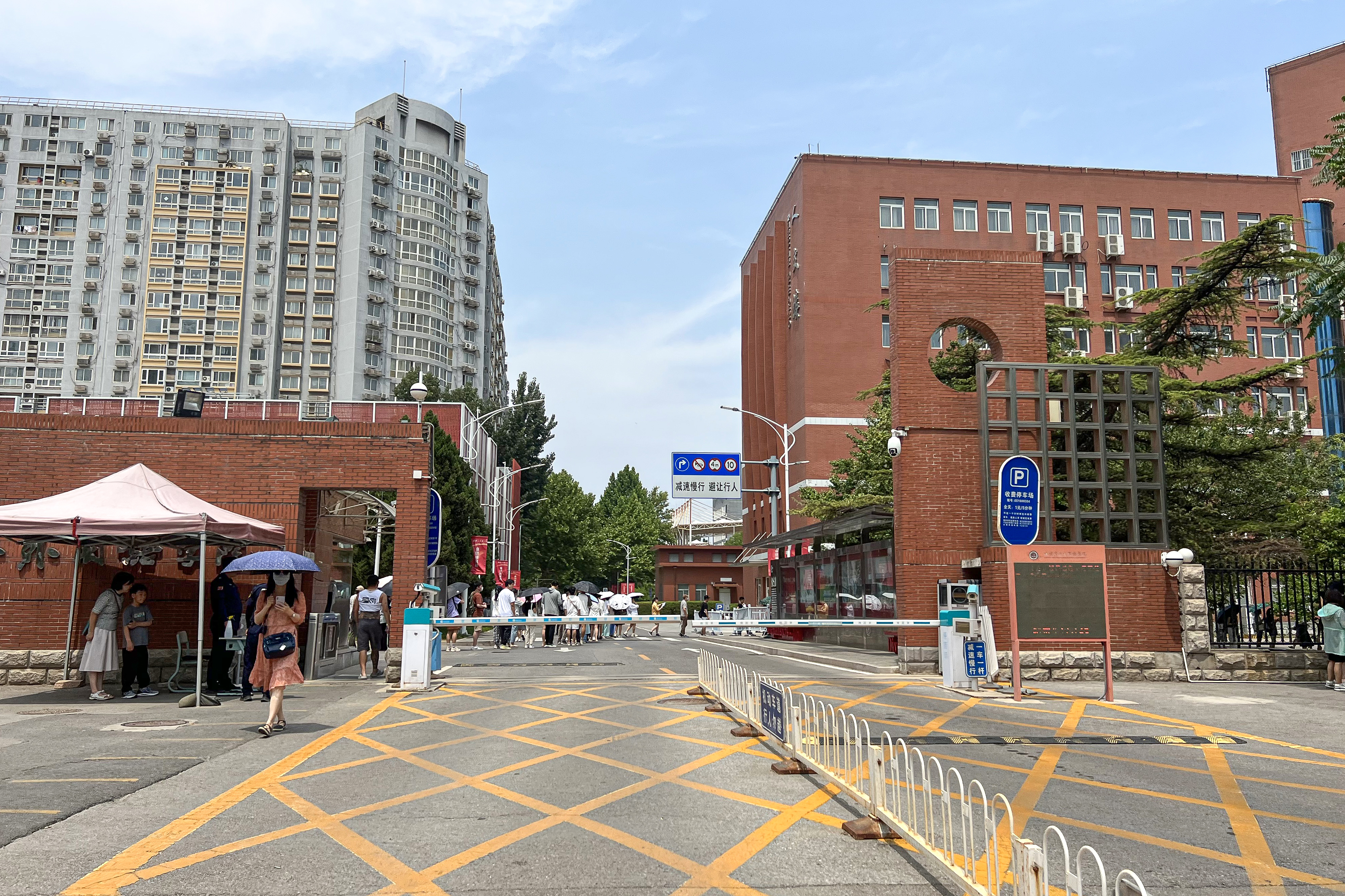
Beijing International Studies University, 2023

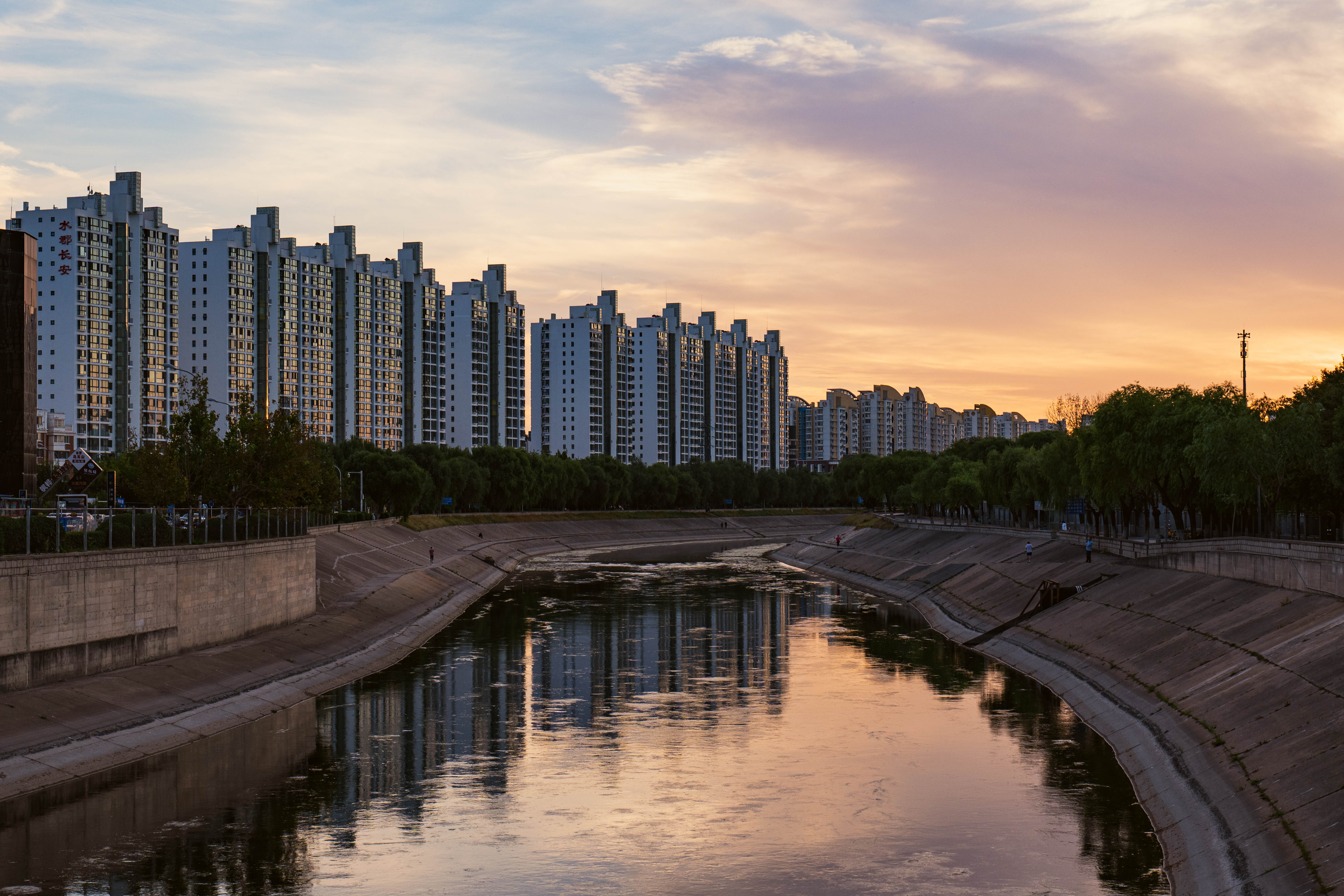
Tonghui River that passes through the subdistrict, 2023

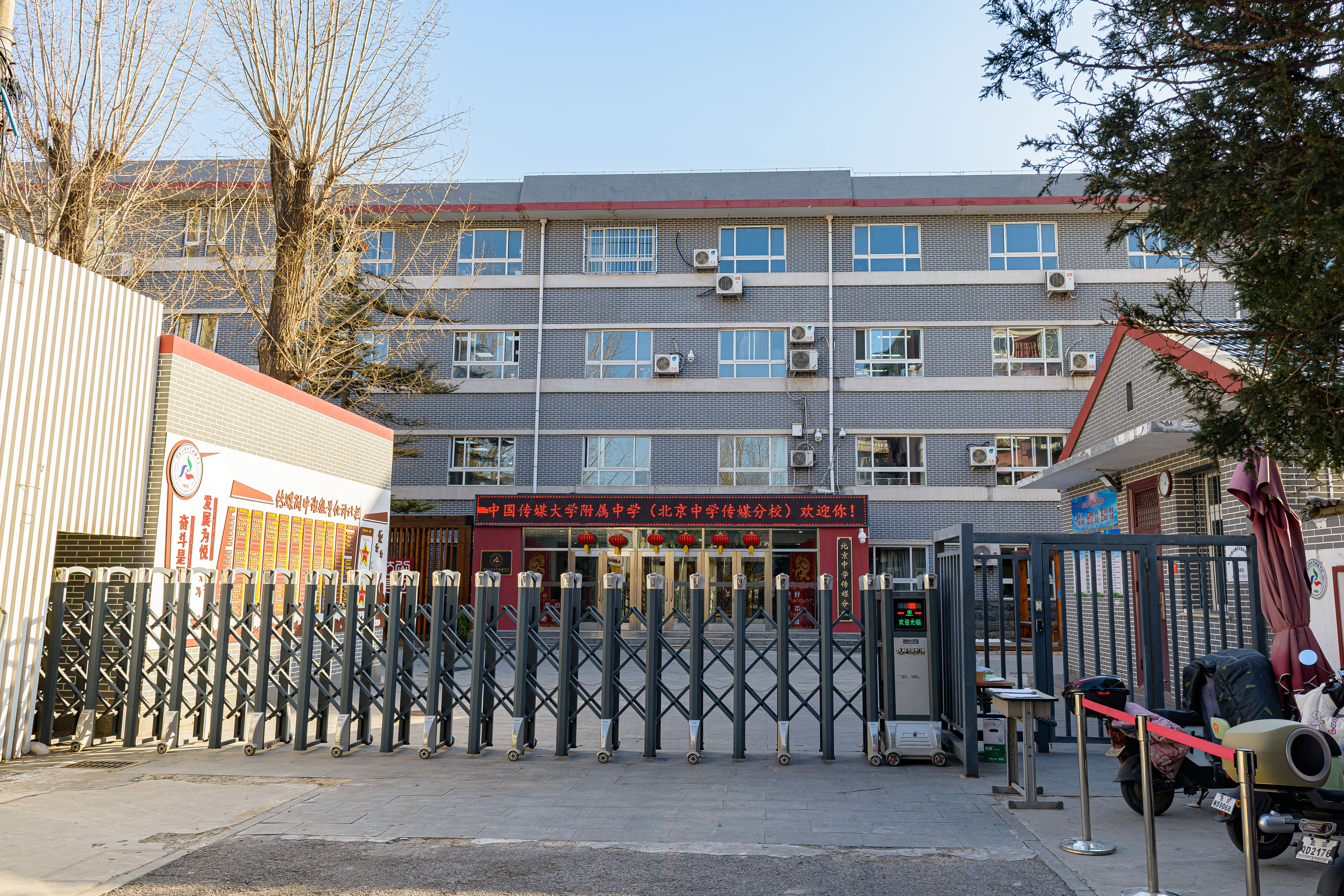
High School Affiliated to Communication University of China, 2024

== See also ==
- List of township-level divisions of Beijing
