= Guanzhuang, Beijing =

Guanzhuang Township 管庄乡
- Township
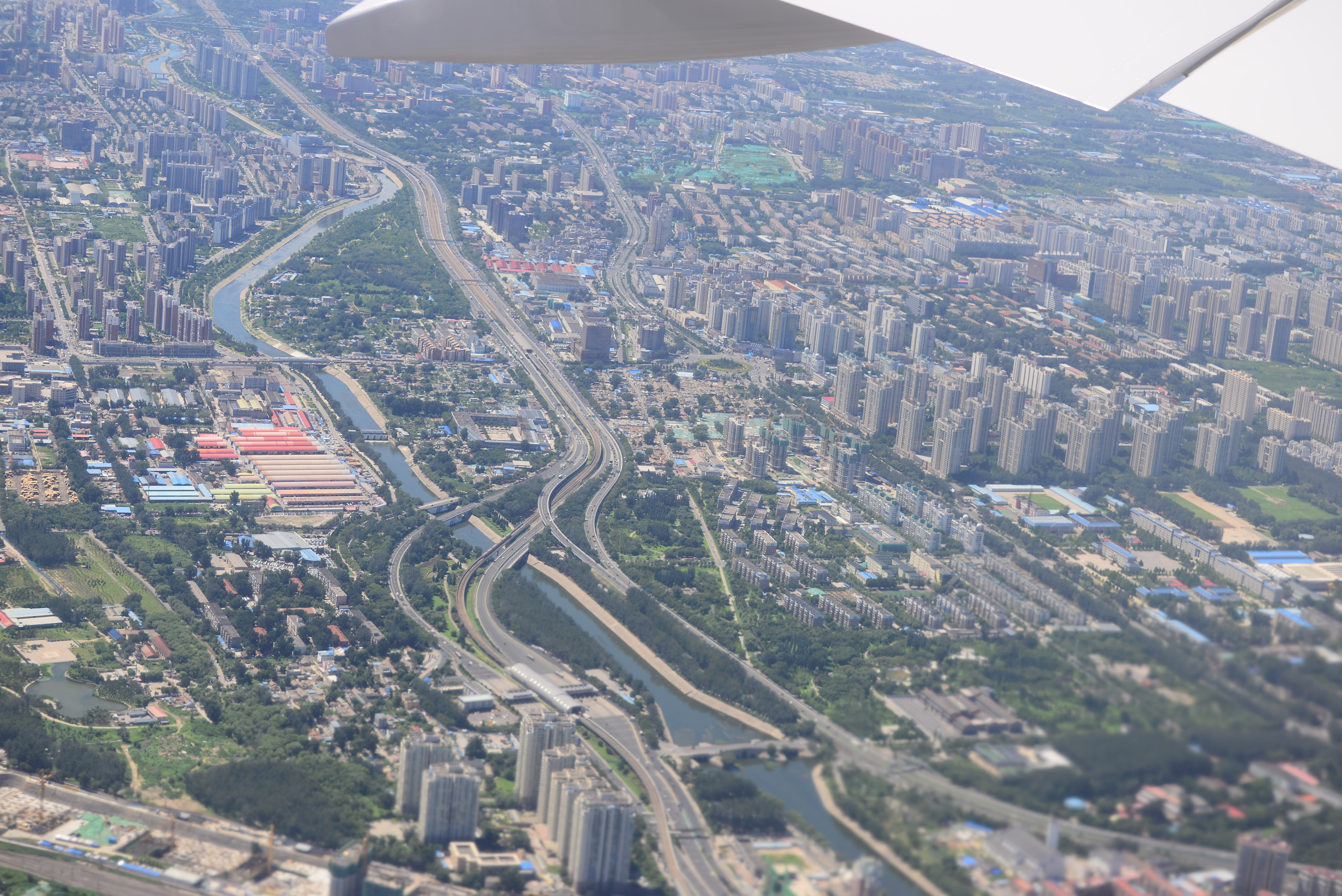
- Aerial view of Guanzhuang in August 2017

- Location within Beijing Location within China
- Coordinates: 39°54′31″N 116°35′23″E
- Country: China
- Municipality: Beijing
- District: Chaoyang
- Village-level Divisions: 14 communities 12 villages

Area
  - Total: 10.3 km^{2} (4.0 sq mi)

Population (2020)
  - Total: 93,273
  - Density: 9,060/km^{2} (23,500/sq mi)
- Time zone: UTC+8 (China Standard)
- Postal code: 100024
- Area code: 010

Guanzhuang Township (Chinese: 管庄乡; pinyin: Guǎnzhuāng Xiāng) is a township located on the eastern side of Chaoyang District, Beijing, China. It sits south of Changying Township, west of Beiyuan Subdistrict and Yongshun Town, north of Heizhuanghu and Dougezhuang Townships, and east of Sanjianfang Township. As of 2021, the area had a population of 93,273.

The name Guanzhuang (Chinese: 管庄; lit. 'Guan's Villa') is from a local village bearing the same name.

== History ==
Timeline of History of Guanzhuang Township
Year	Status
1971	Separated from Sanjianfang Township and formed Guangzhuang Production Team, part of People's Commune of Shuangqiao
1984	Formed Guanzhuang Township in addition to being a production team, part of Shuangqiao Rural Bureau
1998	Separated from Shuangqiao and transferred under Chaoyang District
2003	Became an area while retaining township status

== Administrative Divisions ==
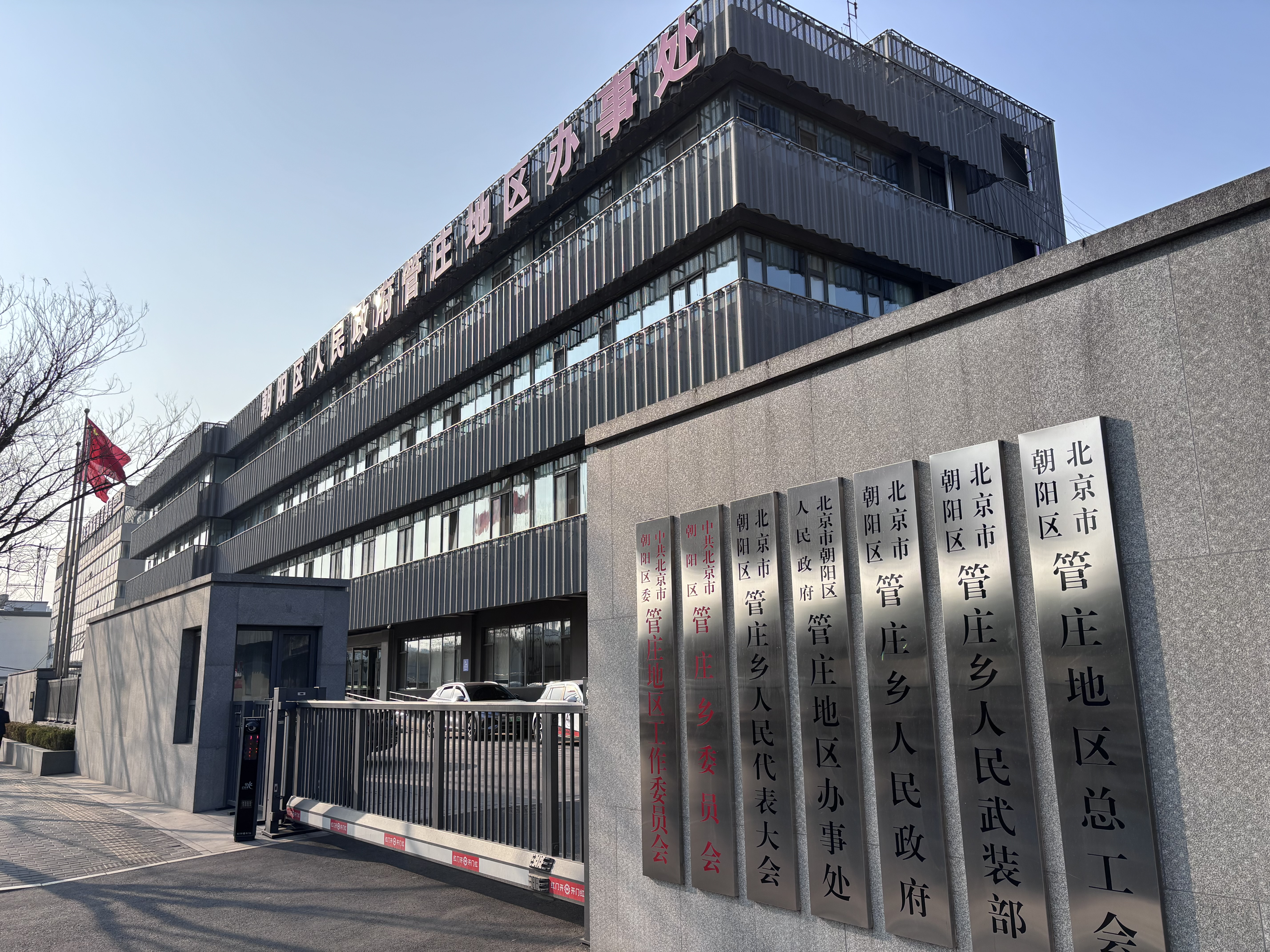
People's Government of Guanzhuang Township / Guanzhuang Area Office

In 2021, Guangzhuang is divided into 26 subdivisions, with 14 communities and 12 villages:

Administrative Division Code	Community Name in English	Community Name in Simplified Chinese	Type
110105035001	Baliqiao	八里桥	Community
110105035002	Guanzhuang Dongli	管庄东里	Community
110105035003	Guanzhuang Xili	管庄西里	Community
110105035004	Jiandongyuan	建东苑	Community
110105035005	Jingtongyuan	京通苑	Community
110105035006	Lijingyuan	丽景苑	Community
110105035007	Huihe Dongli	惠河东里	Community
110105035008	Ruixiangli	瑞祥里	Community
110105035009	Huihe Xili	惠河西里	Community
110105035010	Xintiandi	新天地	Community
110105035011	Yuanyang Yifang Jiayuan	远洋一方嘉园	Community
110105035012	Guanzhuang Beili	管庄北里	Community
110105035013	Yuanyang Yifang Runyuan	远洋一方润园	Community
110105035014	Xintiandiyi	新天地一	Community
110105035200	Xihui	西会	Village
110105035201	Donghui	东会	Desakota
110105035202	Baliqiao	八里桥	Village
110105035203	Guojiadian	果家店	Village
110105035204	Yaying	塔营	Village
110105035205	Xiaosi	小寺	Village
110105035206	Chongxingsi	重兴寺	Village
110105035207	Sixinzhuang	司辛庄	Village
110105035208	Guojiachang	郭家场	Village
110105035209	Yangzha	杨闸	Village
110105035210	Guanzhuangcun	管庄村	Village
110105035211	Xianninghou	咸宁侯	Desakota

== See also ==
- List of township-level divisions of Beijing
