= Haidian Town =

Haidian Town 海淀镇 Wanliu Area (万柳地区)
- Town
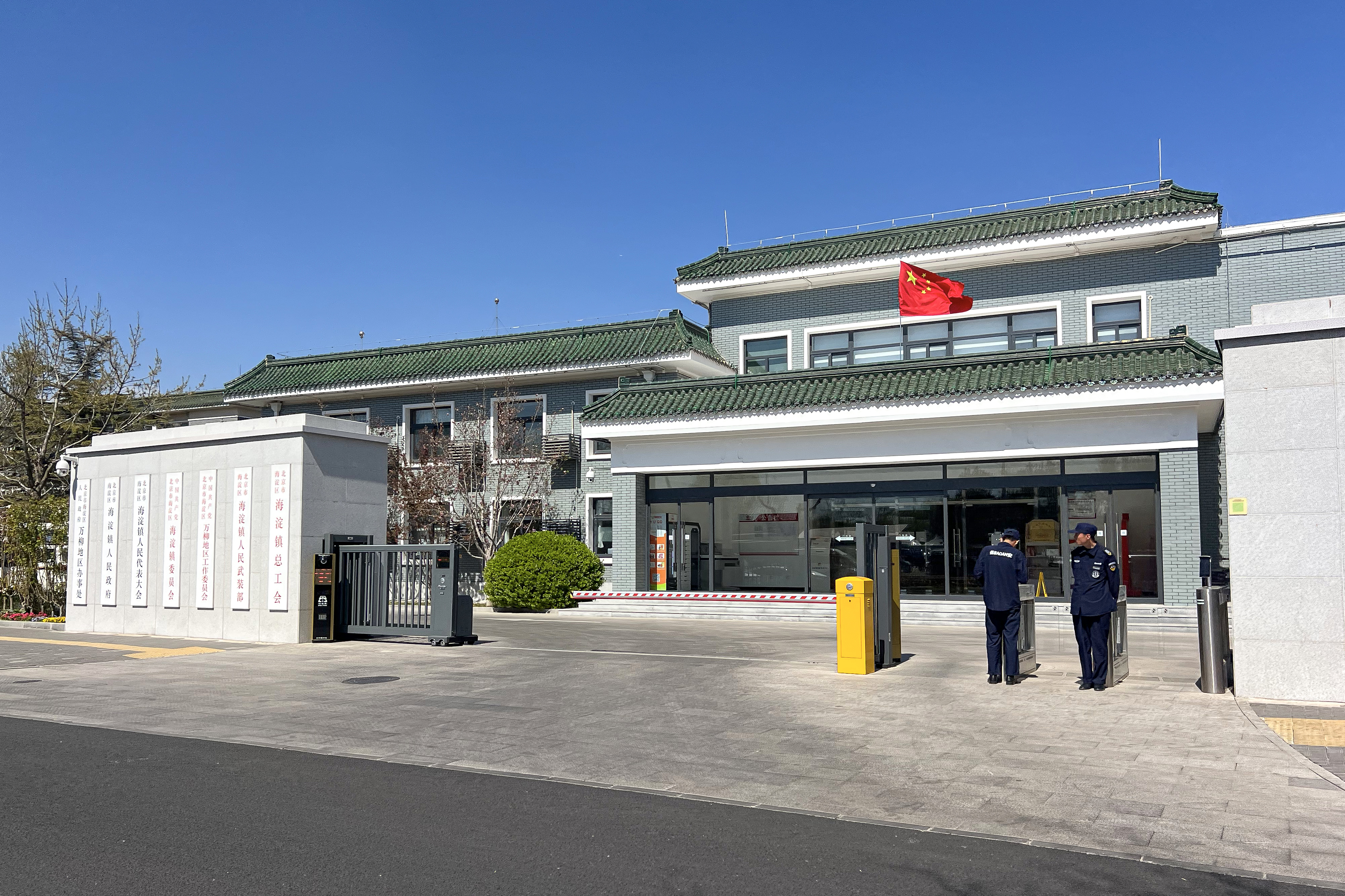
- Government Office of Haidian Town/Wanliu Area, 2025

- Location within Beijing Location within China
- Coordinates: 39°59′22″N 116°17′23″E
- Country: China
- Municipality: Beijing
- District: Haidian
- Village-level Divisions: 2 communities 2 villages 1 residential area

Area
  - Total: 8.86 km^{2} (3.42 sq mi)

Population (2020)
  - Total: 2,022
  - Density: 228/km^{2} (591/sq mi)
- Time zone: UTC+8 (China Standard)
- Postal code: 100089
- Area code: 010

Haidian Town (simplified Chinese: 海淀镇; traditional Chinese: 海澱鎮; pinyin: Hǎidiàn Zhèn), sometimes referred to as Wanliu Area (simplified Chinese: 万柳地区; traditional Chinese: 萬柳地區; pinyin: Wànliǔ Dìqū), and formerly Haidian Township (simplified Chinese: 海淀乡; traditional Chinese: 海澱鄉; pinyin: Hǎidiàn Xiāng) is a town of Haidian District, Beijing, located immediately to the east of Kunming Lake. As of 2020, it had a total population of 2,022, making a drastic decline from 2010's population of 28,062 due to the demolition of Liulangzhuang village within the township.

== History ==
Timeline of Wanliu Area
Time	Status
1949	Part of the 16th District
1950	Part of the 13th District
1952	Part of Haidian District
1958	Organized as Haidian People's Commune
1960	Merged with Qinghe and Dongsheng to form Qinghe People's Commune
1961	Separated from Qinghe and restored as a commune
1969	Incorporated Shucun Production Team
1984	Changed into a township
2001	Became Wanliu Area while retaining its status as Haidian Township
2011	Haidian Township became Haidian Town

== Administrative Divisions ==
At the end of 2021, Wanliu Area was subdivided into 5 divisions, including 2 communities, 2 villages, and 1 residential area for an economic cooperative:

Administrative division code	Subdivision names	Name transliteration	Type
110108023005	六郎庄	Liulangzhuang	Community
110108023006	功德寺	Gongdesi	Community
110108023203	青龙桥	Qinglongqiao	Village
110108023204	树村	Shucun	Village
110108023500	万柳（集团）股份经济合作社六郎庄	Wanliu (Jituan) Gufen Jingji Hezuoshe Liulangzhuang	Residential Area

== See also ==
- List of township-level divisions of Beijing
