= Production team (China) =

Former rural administrative division of the People's Republic of China

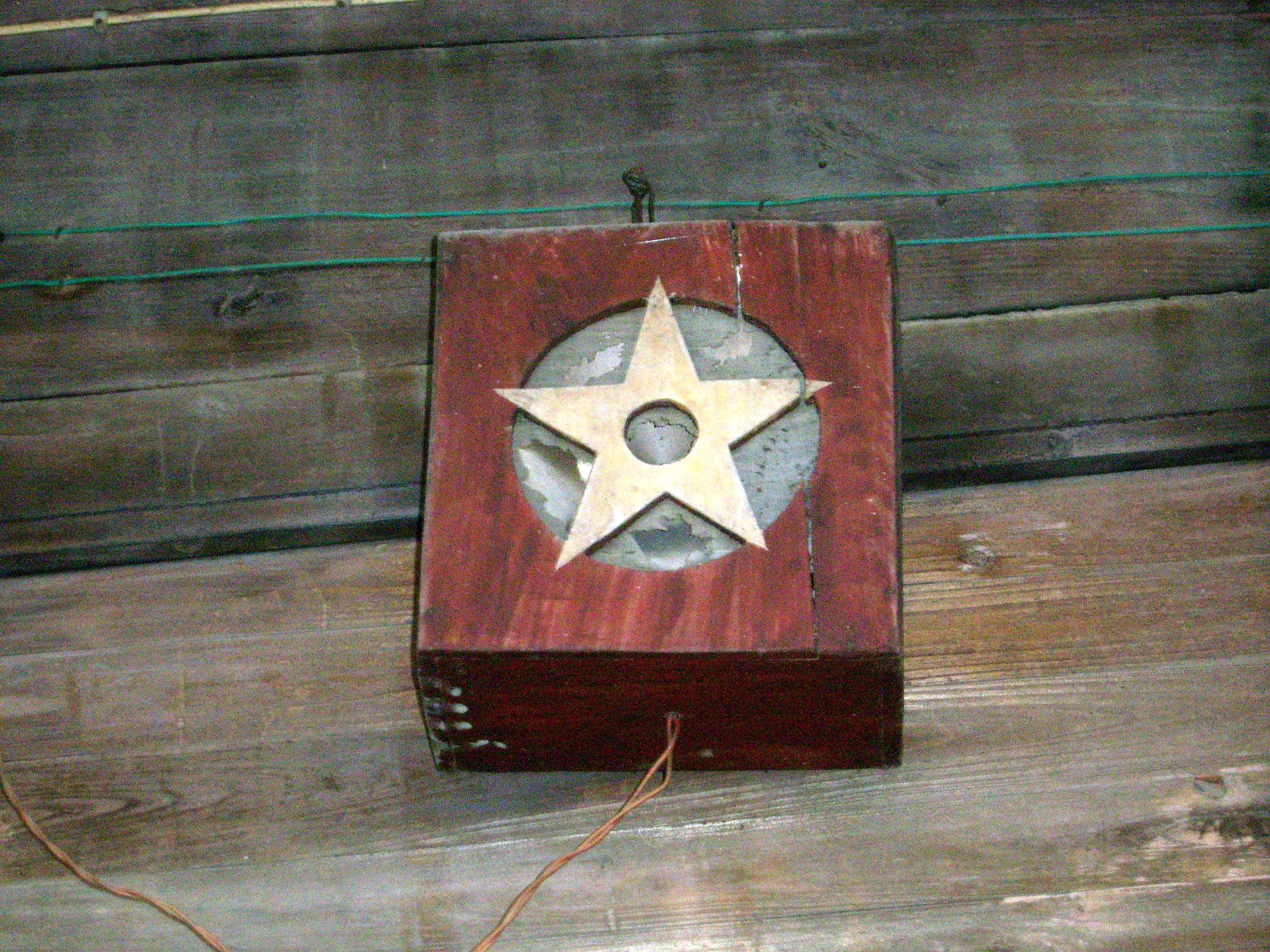
Loudspeakers typical of those installed in households by their production teams

A production team (simplified Chinese: 生产队; traditional Chinese: 生産隊; pinyin: shēng chǎn duì) was formerly the basic accounting and farm production unit in the people's commune system in People's Republic of China from 1958 to 1984.

In the administrative hierarchy, the team was the lowest level, the next higher levels being the production brigade and people's commune. Typically the team owned most of the land and was responsible for income distribution. Since 1984 production teams have been replaced by village groups.

In late 1960, the unit of accounting through which labor and income were allocated was devolved from the people's commune to the production brigade. In many cases, these brigades corresponded to the high level agricultural producers' cooperatives that had preceded the people's communes. In 1962, the unit of account was further devolved to the production team, which remained the unit of account until agricultural was totally decollectivized between 1979 and 1982.

== See also ==
- Township and Village Enterprises
- People's commune
- Work unit
- Economy of China
- Industry of China
- Agriculture in China
