= Ronghua Subdistrict, Beijing =

Ronghua Subdistrict 荣华街道
- Subdistrict
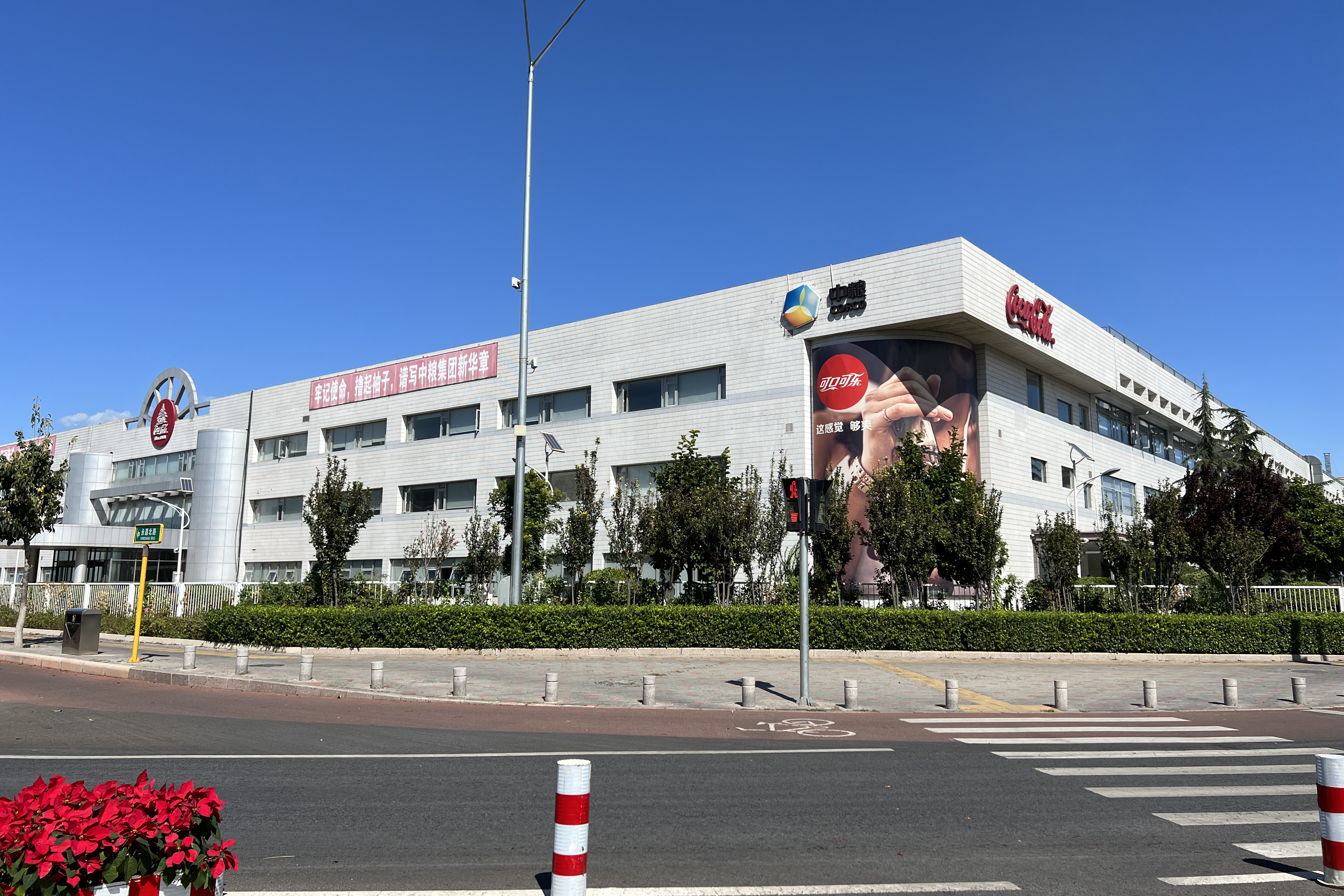
- Office building of COFCO Coca Cola

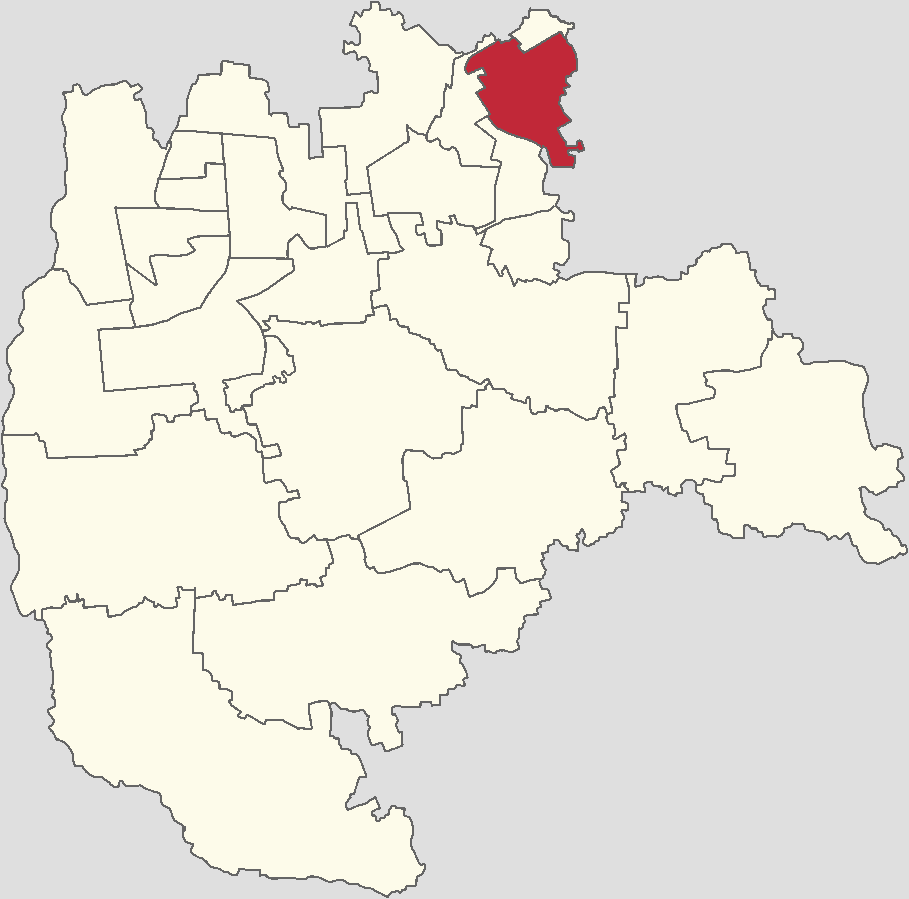
- Location of Ronghua Subdistrict in Daxing District

- Location within Beijing Location within China
- Coordinates: 39°46′52″N 116°29′24″E
- Country: China
- Municipality: Beijing
- District: Daxing
- Village-level Divisions: 8 communities

Area
  - Total: 15.8 km^{2} (6.1 sq mi)
- Elevation: 33 m (108 ft)
- Time zone: UTC+8 (China Standard)
- Postal code: 102676
- Area code: 010

Ronghua Subdistrict (simplified Chinese: 荣华街道; traditional Chinese: 榮華街道; pinyin: Rónghuá Jiēdào) is a subdistrict located on the north of Daxing District, Beijing, China. It is within and under the administration of Beijing Economic-Technological Development Area. Ronghua borders Shibalidian Township and an exclave of Yizhuang Town to the north, Taihu and Majuqiao Towns to the east, Boxing Subdistrict to the south, and Yizhuang Town to the west. The name Ronghua literally translates to "Glory".

== Administrative divisions ==
As of 2021, Ronghua Subdistrict administers 8 residential communities. They are listed as follows:

Administrative division code	Subdivision names	Name transliteration
110115012001	天华园一里	Tianhuayuan Yili
110115012002	天华园二里	Tianhuayuan Erli
110115012003	天华园三里	Tianhuayuan Sanli
110115012004	天宝园金地格林小镇	Tianbaoyuan Jindi Gelin Xiaozhen
110115012005	天宝园卡尔百丽	Tianbaoyuan Ka'erbaili
110115012006	天宝园上海沙龙	Tianbaoyuan Shanghai Shalong
110115012007	天宝园大雄郁金香舍	Tianbaoyuan Daxiong Yujinxiang She
110115012008	林肯公园	Linken Gongyuan

== Gallery ==
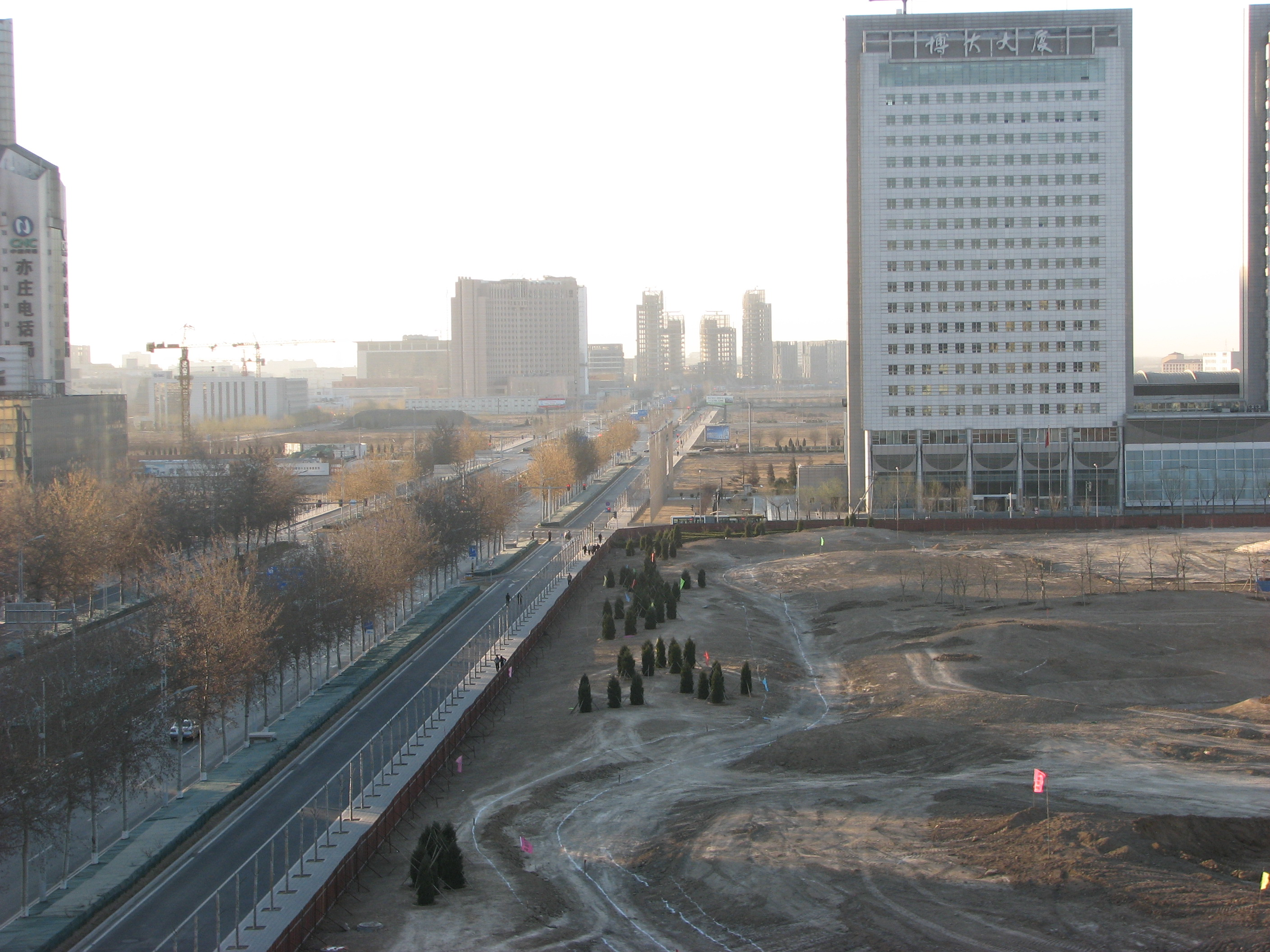
Aerial view of the region, 2008

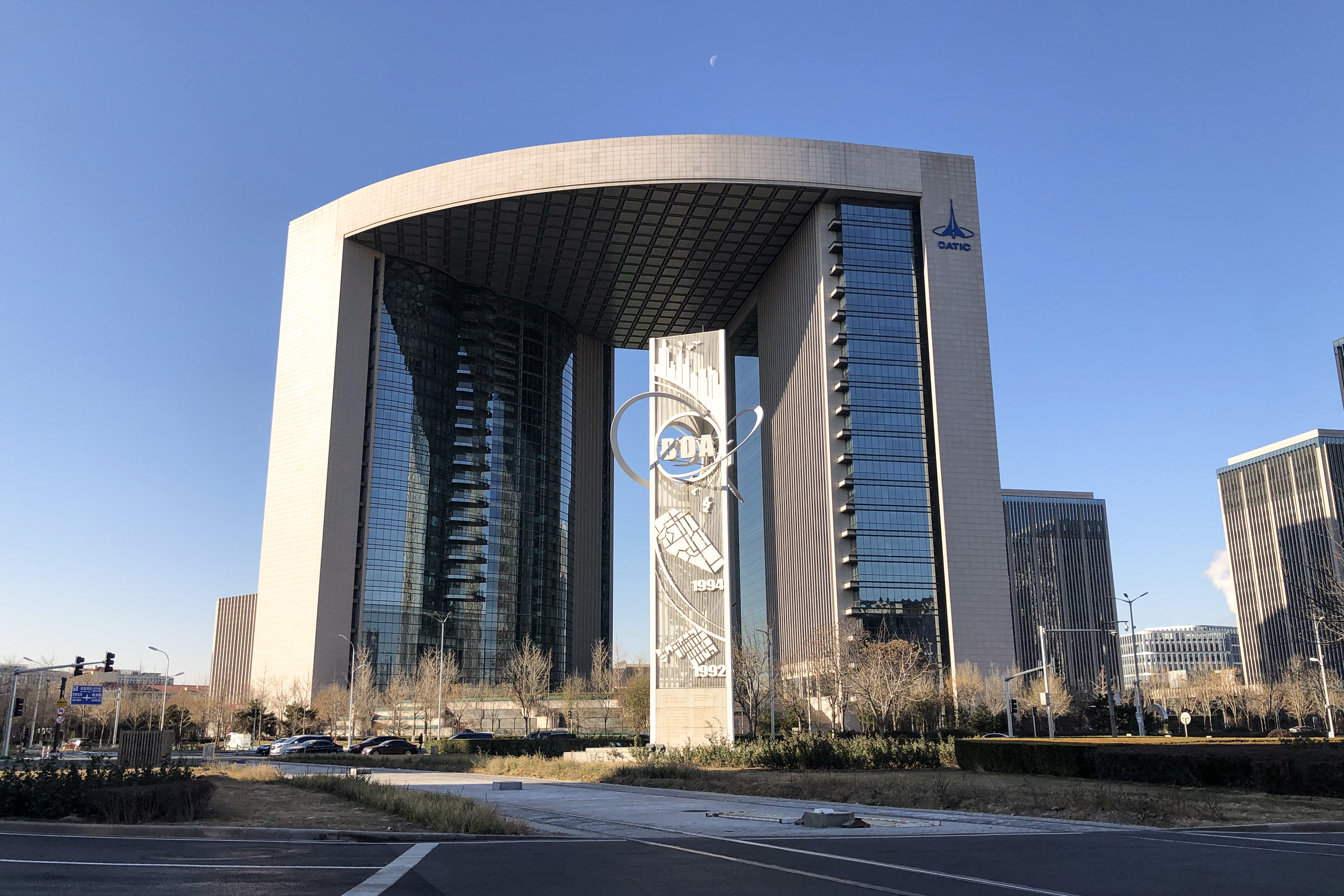
CATIC Plaza, 2020

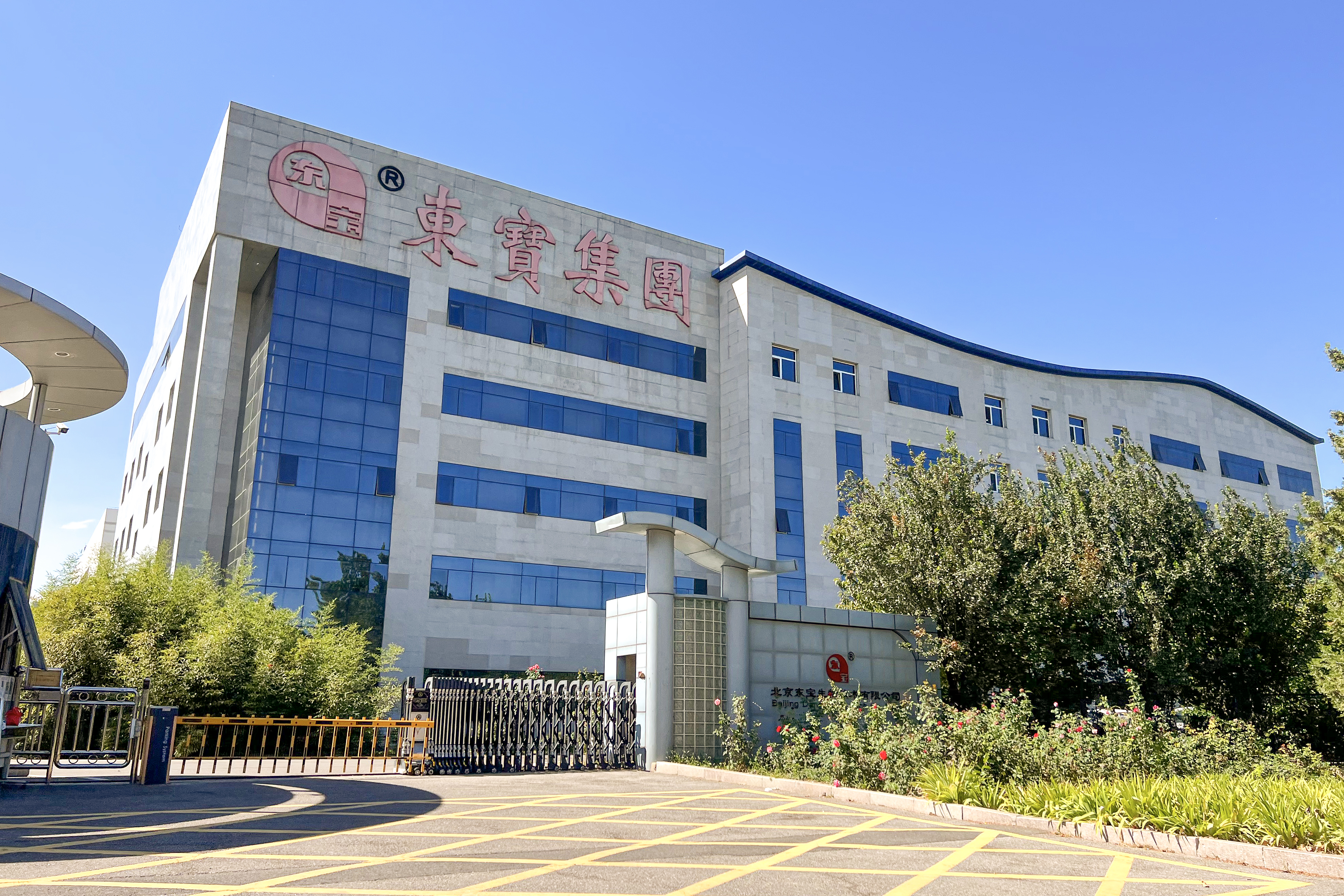
Headquarter of Beijing Dongbao Biotech Co. Lid., 2022

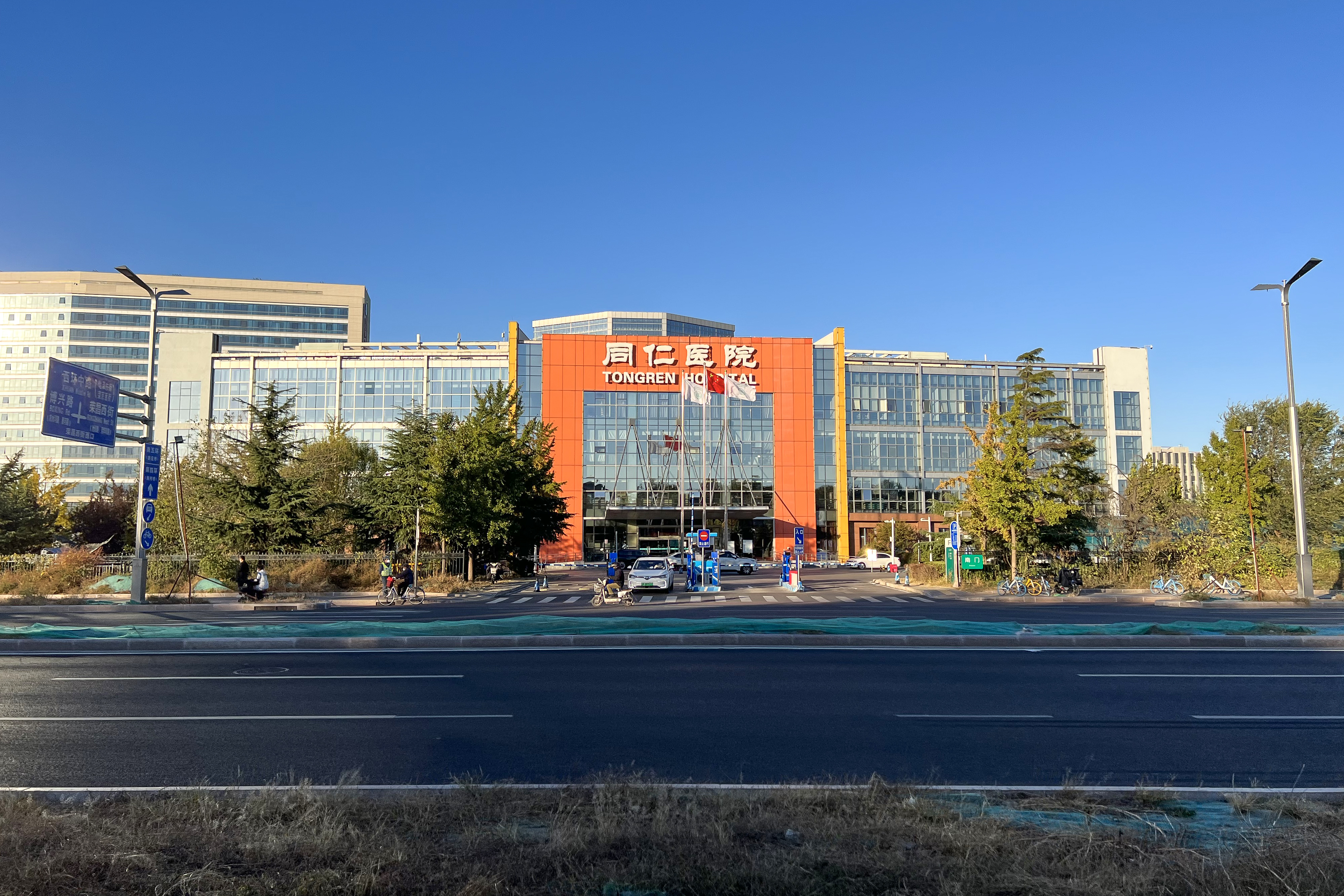
Beijing Tongren Hospital, 2022

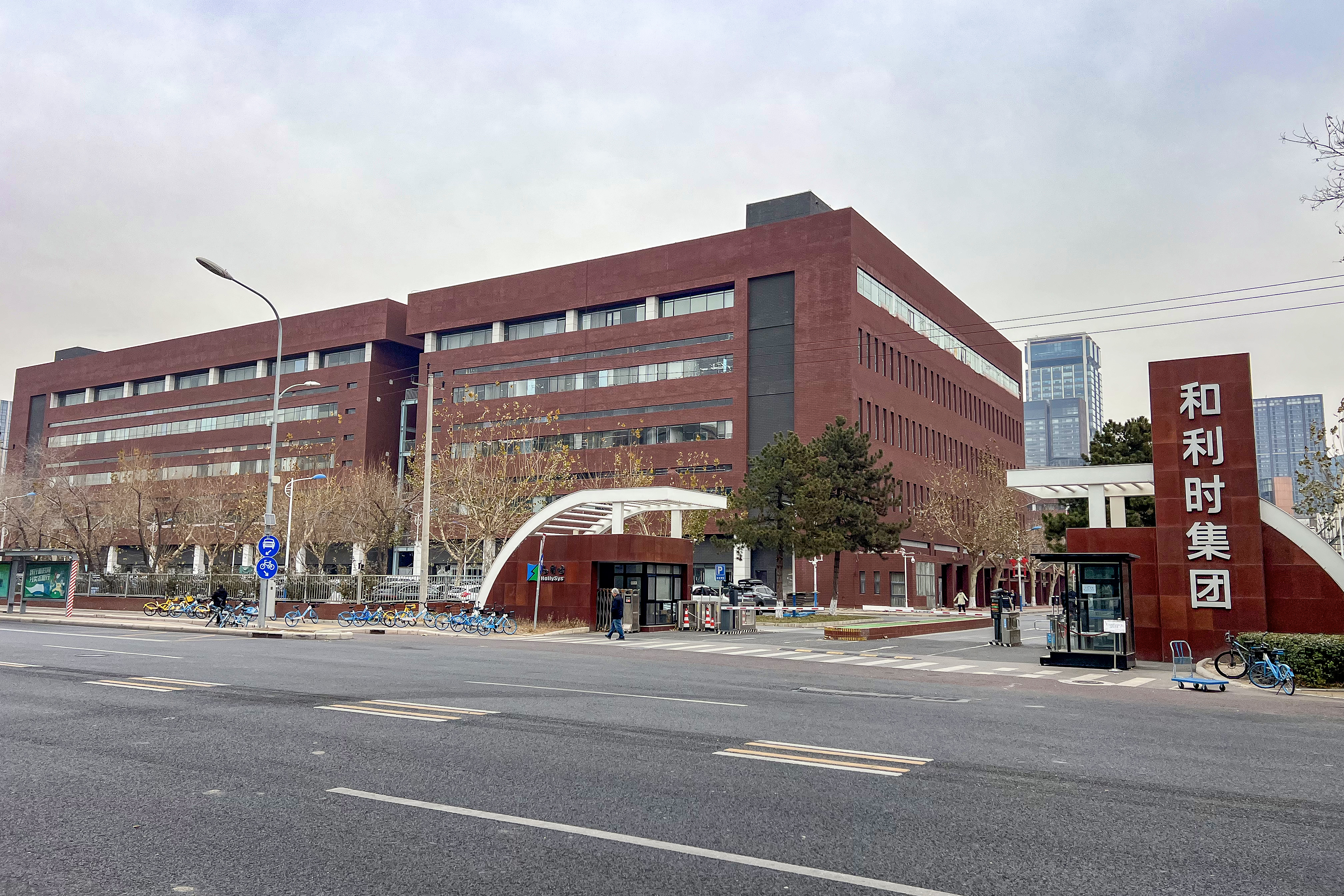
HollySys Group, 2024

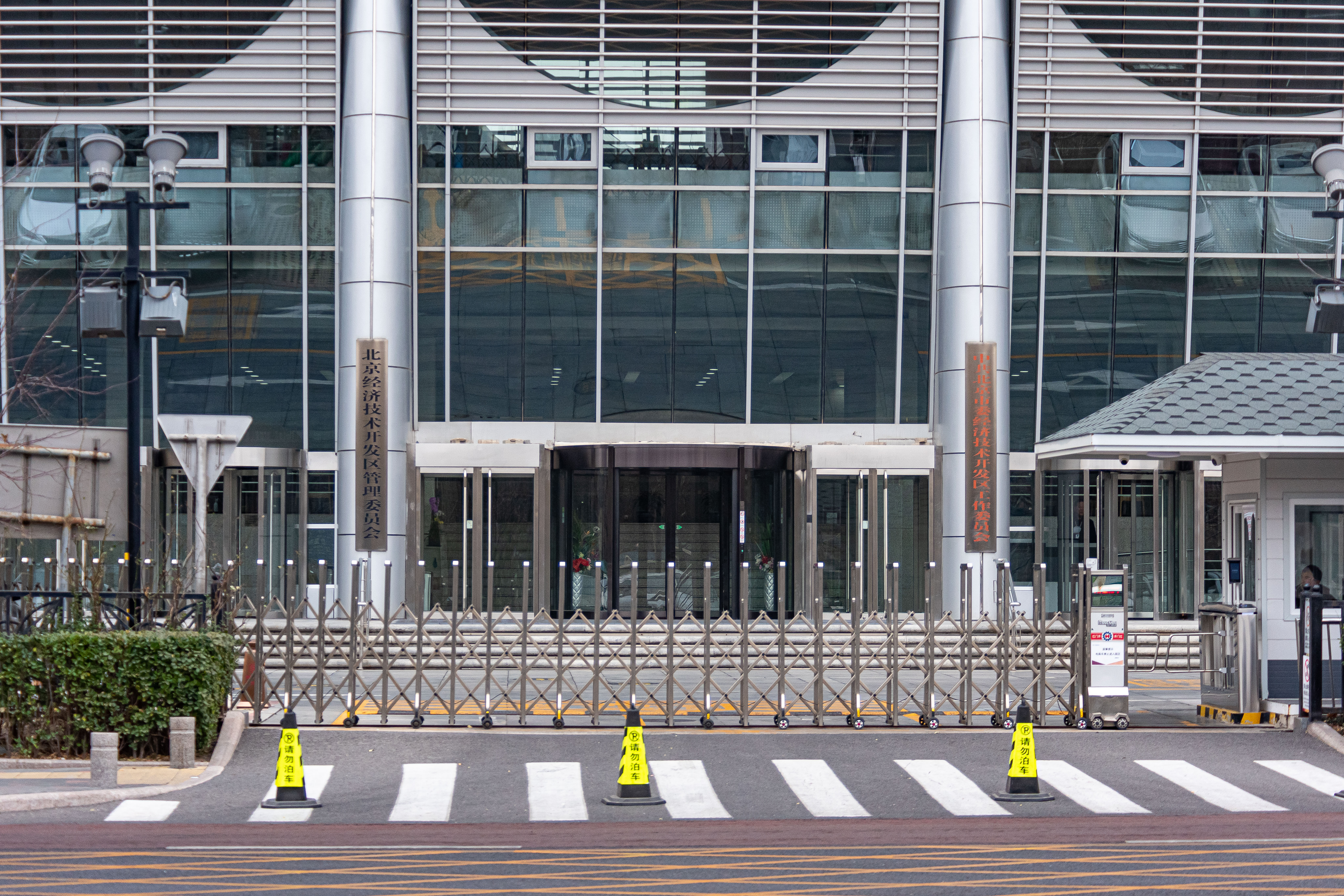
Administrative Committee of the BDA, 2024

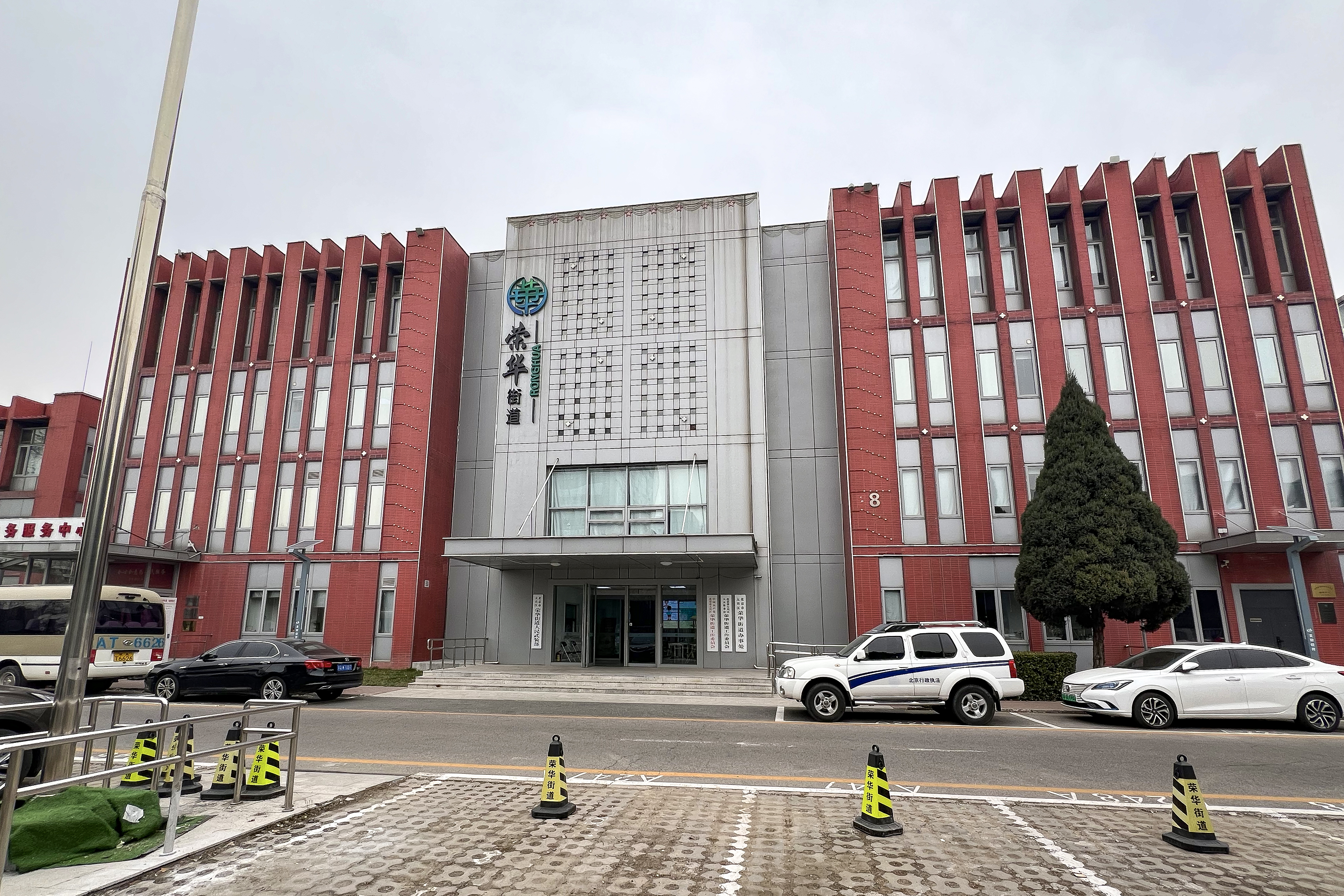
Seat of Ronghua Subdistrict, 2024

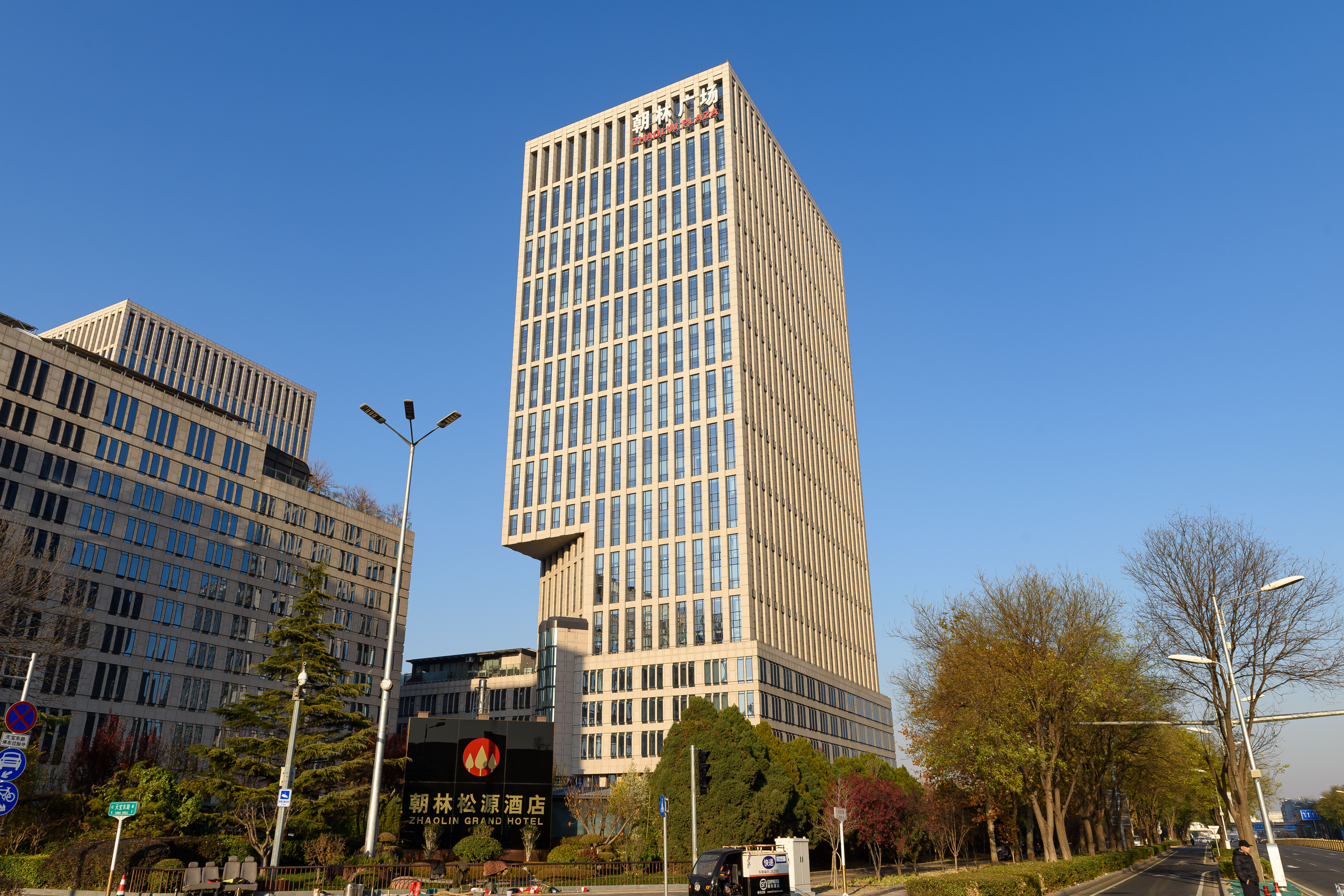
Zhaolin Plaza, 2025

== See also ==
- List of township-level divisions of Beijing
