= Yizhuang =

Yizhuang may refer to:

- Beijing Economic-Technological Development Area (Yizhuang Development Area), in Beijing
- Yizhuang, Beijing (亦庄地区), area of Daxing District, Beijing
- Yizhuang Line, Beijing Subway
- Yizhuang railway station, station on the Beijing–Tianjin intercity railway
- Yizhuang, Xuzhou (伊庄镇), town in and subdivision of Tongshan District, Xuzhou, Jiangsu
