= Yizhuang Culture Park station =

Beijing Subway station

Yizhuang Culture Park 亦庄文化园
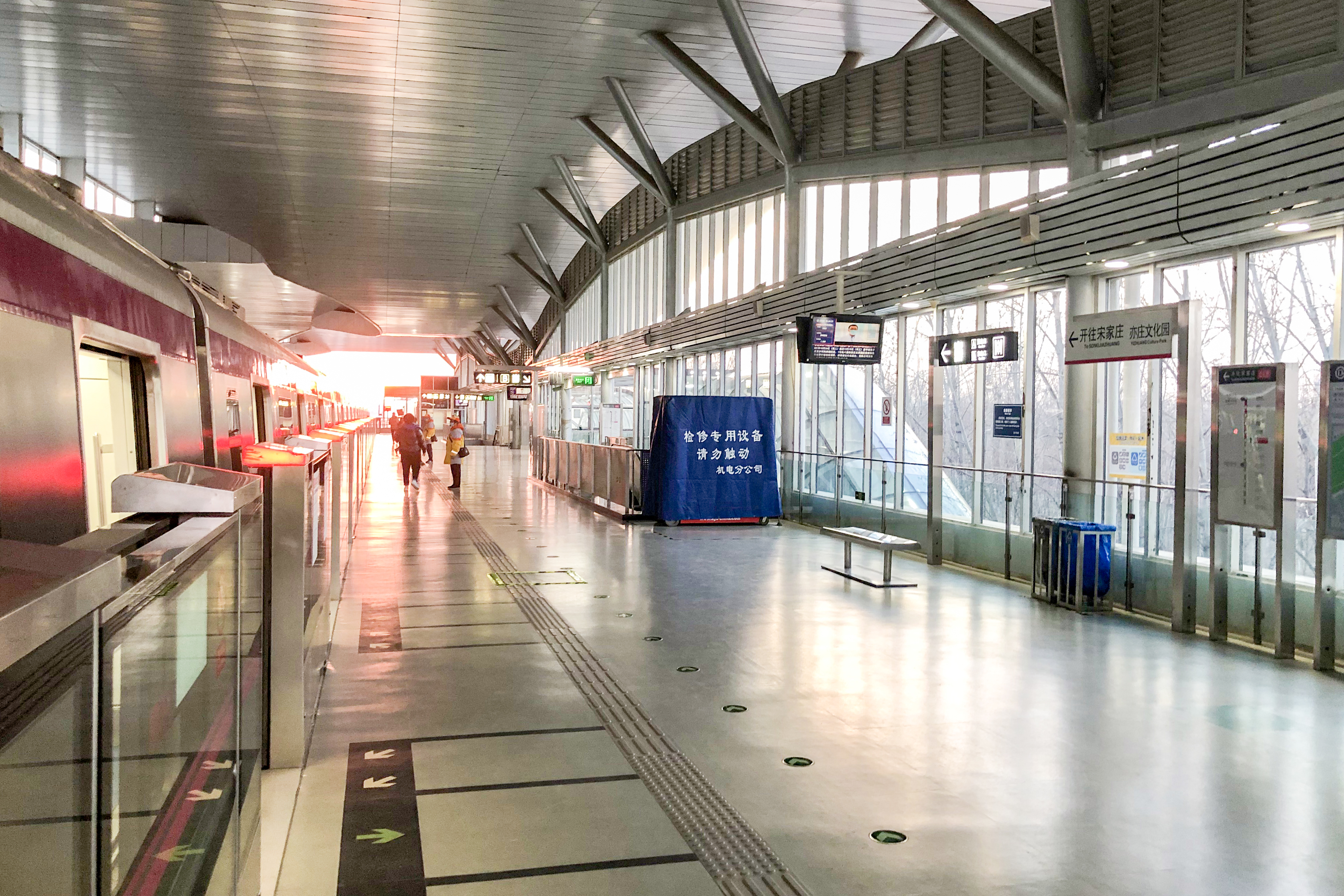

General information
- Location: Wenhuayuan West Road (文化园西路) and Tianhua East Road (天华东路); Yizhuang, Daxing District, Beijing; China
- Coordinates: 39°48′25″N 116°29′27″E
- Operator: Beijing Mass Transit Railway Operation Corporation Limited
- Line: Yizhuang line
- Platforms: 2 (2 side platforms)
- Tracks: 2

Construction
- Structure type: Elevated
- Accessible: Yes

History
- Opened: December 30, 2010; 15 years ago

Services
Preceding station	Beijing Subway	Following station
Yizhuang Qiao towards Songjiazhuang	Yizhuang line	Wanyuan Jie towards Yizhuang railway station
Location
- Location within Beijing

Yizhuang Culture Park station (simplified Chinese: 亦庄文化园站; traditional Chinese: 亦莊文化園站; pinyin: Yìzhuāng Wénhuàyuán zhàn) is a Subway station on the Yizhuang Line of the Beijing Subway. It opened on December 30, 2010, together with the other stations on the line.

== Station layout ==
The station has 2 elevated side platforms.

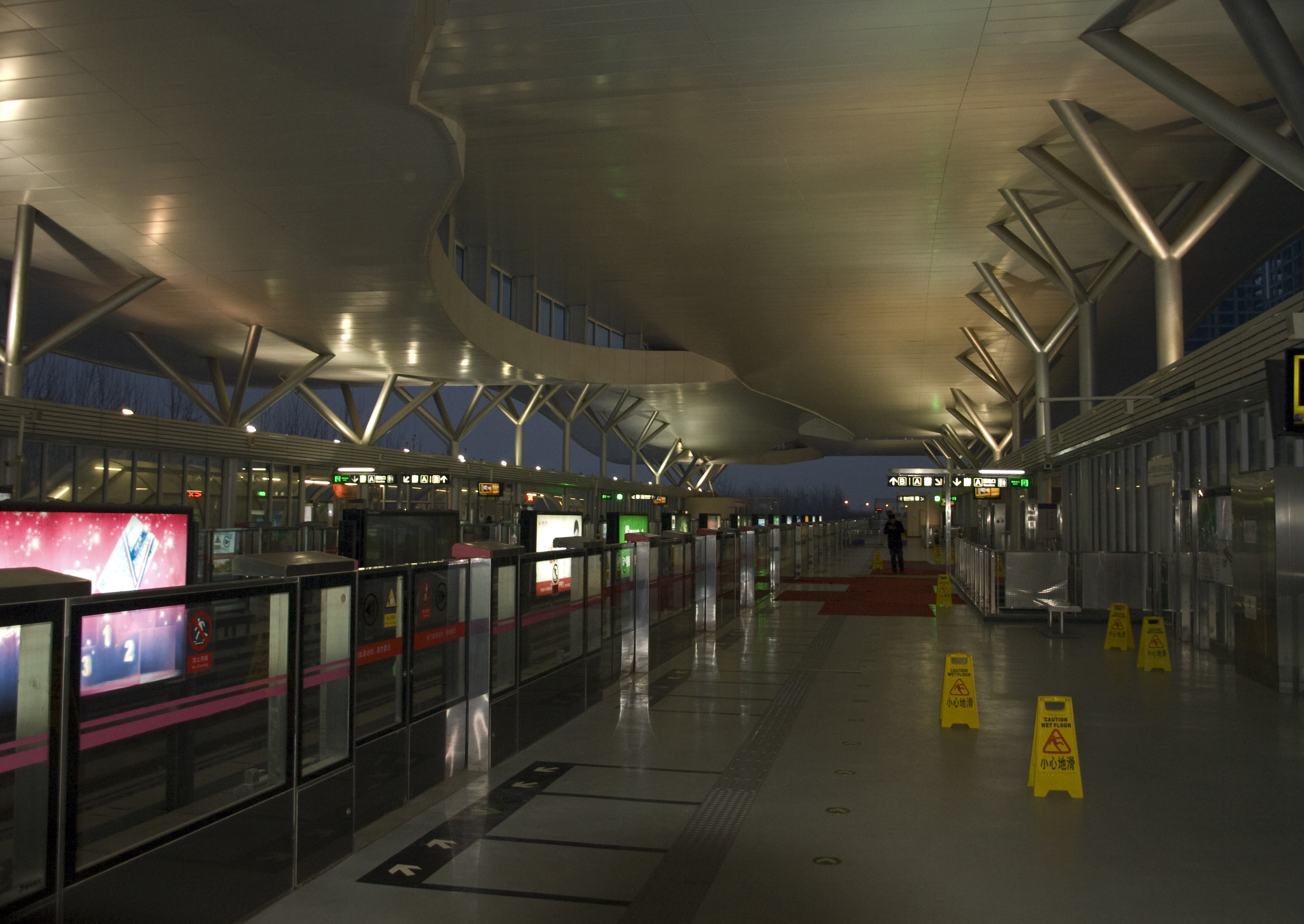
The platforms

== Exits ==
There are 2 exits, lettered A1 and B1. Exit A1 is accessible.
