= China National Aero-Technology Import & Export Corporation =

Military Equipment & Construction

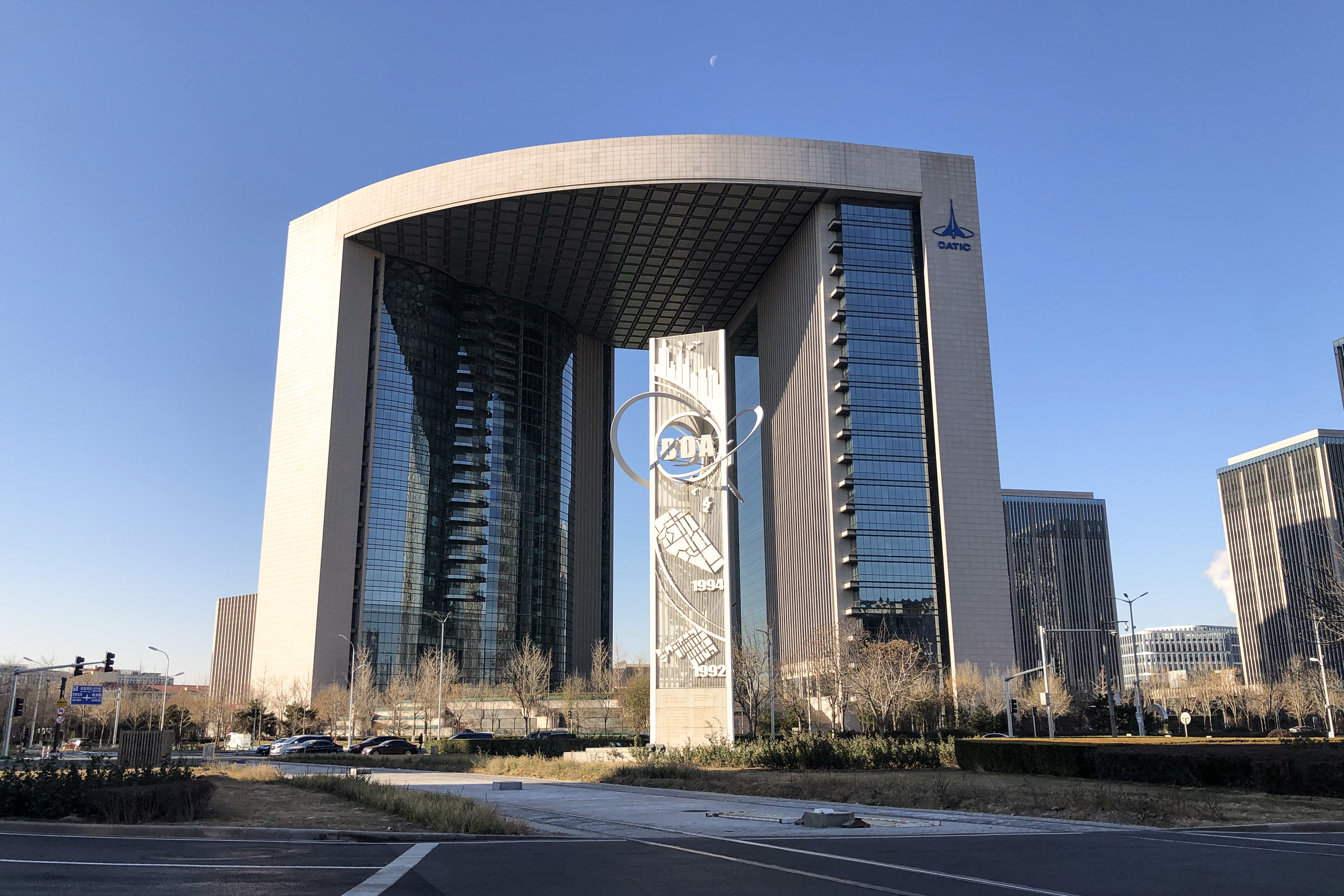
- CATIC Plaza in Yizhuang, Beijing
- Company type: State-owned
- Industry: Defense
- Founded: Beijing, China; 1979; 47 years ago
- Headquarters: Beijing Economic-Technological Development Area, Beijing, China. Branch = Sri Lanka.Azerbaijan
- Area served: Worldwide
- Key people: Yang, Ying (president); Wu, Shengyue (chairman of the board)
- Products: Military aircraft Defense Technology; Advanced electronic sensors and systems & CONSTRUCTION
- Total assets: ▲ Over CN¥40 billion (2007)
- Number of employees: Over 500,000 (2012)
- Website: www.catic.cn

China National Aero-Technology Import & Export Corporation (CATIC, Chinese: 中航技进出口有限责任公司) is a Chinese state-owned defense company with a core business in aviation products and technology. It is the exclusive representative of the Aviation Industry Corporation of China (AVIC) in the global market.

== History ==
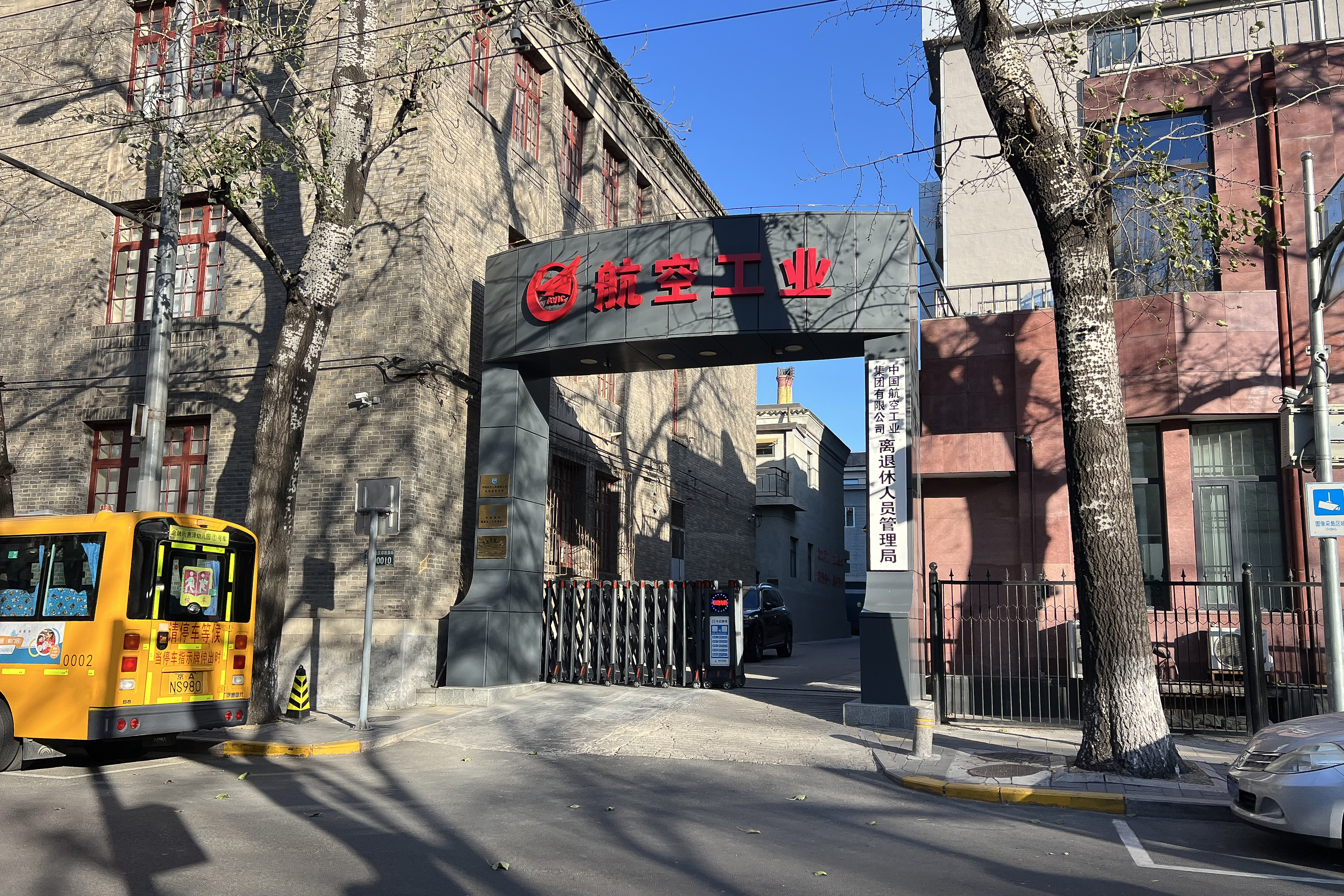
First-generation headquarters of CATIC before February 1995

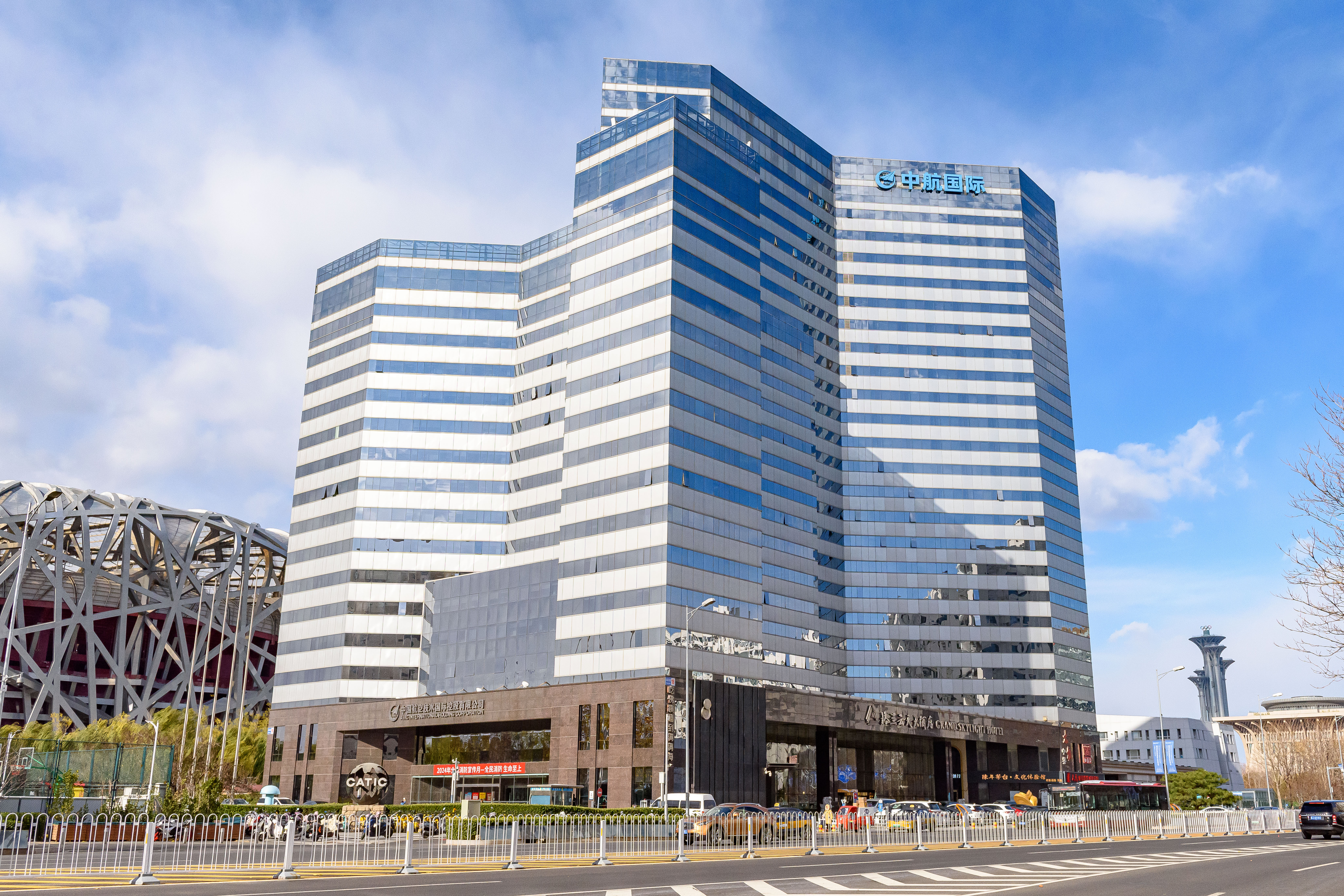
Former headquarters of CATIC, still used by AVIC International as of 2024. The building was initially the athletes' village for 1994 FESPIC Games.

China National Aero-Technology Import & Export Corporation (CATIC, Chinese: 中国航空技术进出口公司), was originally established in 1979, as a state-owned company owned by the Third Ministry of Machine Building of the People's Republic of China. In 1989, it was renamed in Chinese (CATIC, Chinese: 中国航空技术进出口总公司), as a state-owned company owned by the Ministry of Aerospace Industry of the People's Republic of China. In 1993, the Ministry of Aerospace Industry of the People's Republic of China was dissolved. The Aviation Industry Corporation of China (AVIC, Chinese: 中国航空工业总公司) was established and CATIC was reorganized into CATIC Group (CATIC Group, Chinese: 中航技企业集团) in the same year. In 1999, The Aviation Industry Corporation of China (AVIC, Chinese: 中国航空工业总公司) was divided into AVIC I and AVIC II and CATIC Group became a joint venture company owned by the two groups. In 2008, AVIC I and AVIC II were integrated into the Aviation Industry Corporation of China (AVIC, Chinese: 中国航空工业集团公司) and CATIC Group became its wholly owned subsidiary. In 2009, CATIC Group was reorganized into two different corporations, i.e. AVIC International Holding Corporation (AVIC INTL, Chinese: 中国航空技术国际控股有限公司) and China National Aero-Technology Import & Export Corporation (CATIC, Chinese: 中航技进出口有限责任公司), both under AVIC.

== Products and services ==
CATIC is headquartered in Beijing. As a state authorized dealer of aviation products, CATIC has exported fighters, trainers, bombers, helicopters, transporters, UAVs, general aviation aircraft and associated airborne equipment and ground support equipment as well as various components and spare parts of military and civil purposes to more than 30 countries. Through multinational cooperation, CATIC has invested and developed high-performance aircraft such as K-8 trainer, JF-17 fighter and EC-120 helicopter.

Specialized companies and regional subsidiaries of CATIC in Beijing, Shanghai, Guangzhou, Shenzhen, Zhuhai, Xiamen, Fujian, Hangzhou, Dalian and Harbin focus on non-aviation business in commerce, finance, real estate, hotel and real estate management, public tendering and bidding, machinery procurement, civil construction, logistics, investment, leasing, e-business, etc. Their main products include ships, civil engineering machinery, food processing machines, medical equipment, container inspection systems, automobiles, motorcycles, bicycles and spare services. In addition, CATIC has contracted international construction projects for countries and regions in Asia, Africa and Middle East.

CATIC is the owner of some famous brands and enterprises: FIYTA watches, Shennan circuit, Tianma LCD, Tianhong shopping mall chains, Jiangnan Securities, etc.

=== Aircraft ===
Fighters: J-10, JF-17/FC-1 Thunder, F-7, JH-7E

Trainer Fighter: L-15, FTC-2000, FT-7

Trainer: K-8, PT-6

Helicopter: Z-19, Z-11, Z-10, Z-9, Z-8, AC311, AC312, AC313

Transporter: Y-9, Y-8, MA60, MA600, MA700, Y-12E, Y-12F, LE500

UAVs: Wing Loong, Cloud Shadow, Harrier, U8E

== Divisions ==
The CATIC headquarters in Beijing is assembled by two different divisions, which all under supervised by managing committees.

CATIC also owns two public companies listed on Hong Kong stock market and three companies listed on Shanghai Stock Exchange and Shenzhen Stock Exchange.

=== Core Business Divisions ===
- Sales Division
- Product Division
- Customer Support Division
- Spare Parts Supply Division
- Aviation R&D Division
- Aviation Engineering Division

=== Supporting divisions ===
- Operation Management Division
- Finance & Audit Division
- Human Resources Division
