= Boxing Subdistrict =

Boxing Subdistrict 博兴街道
- Subdistrict
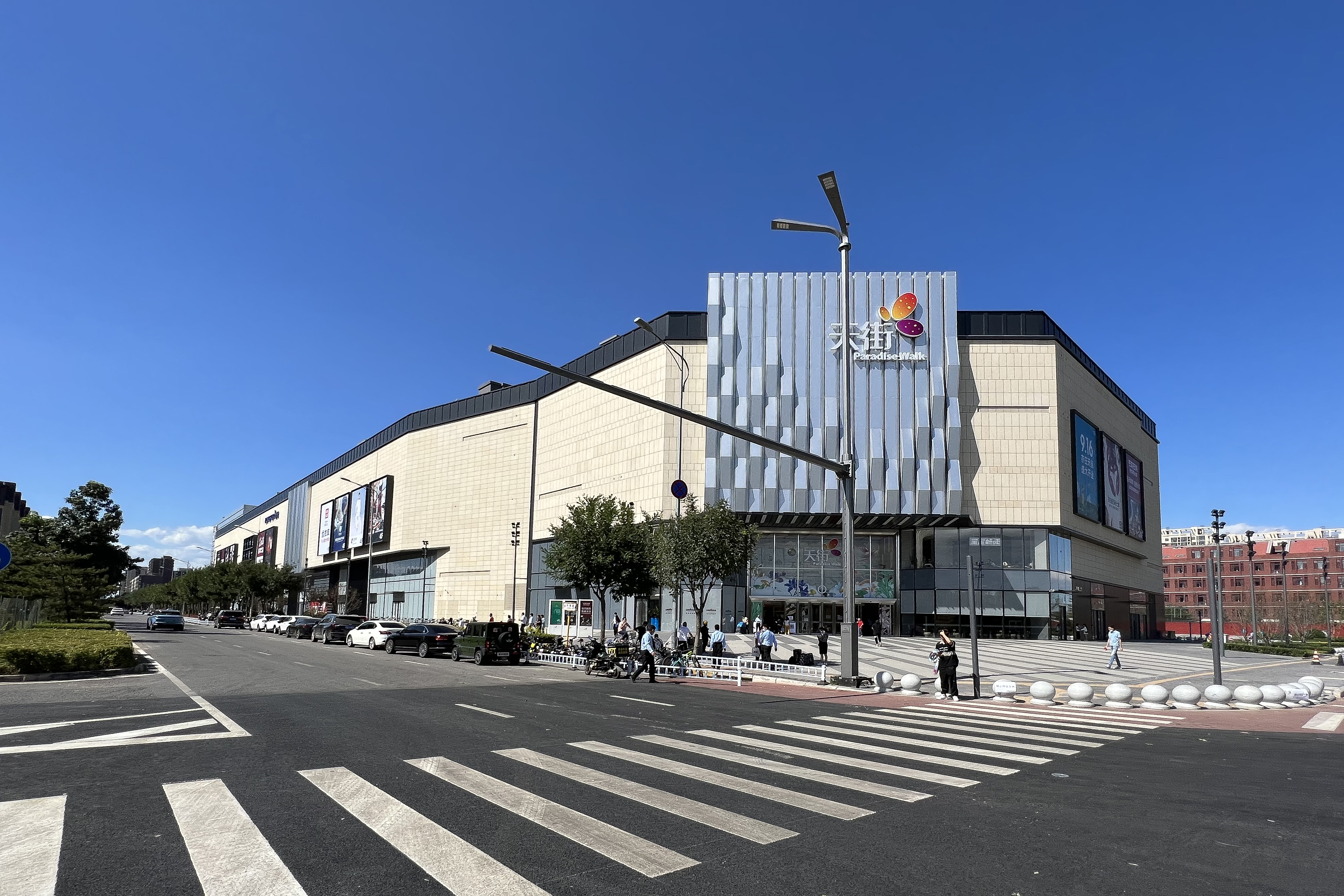
- Yizhuang Paradise Walk, 2022

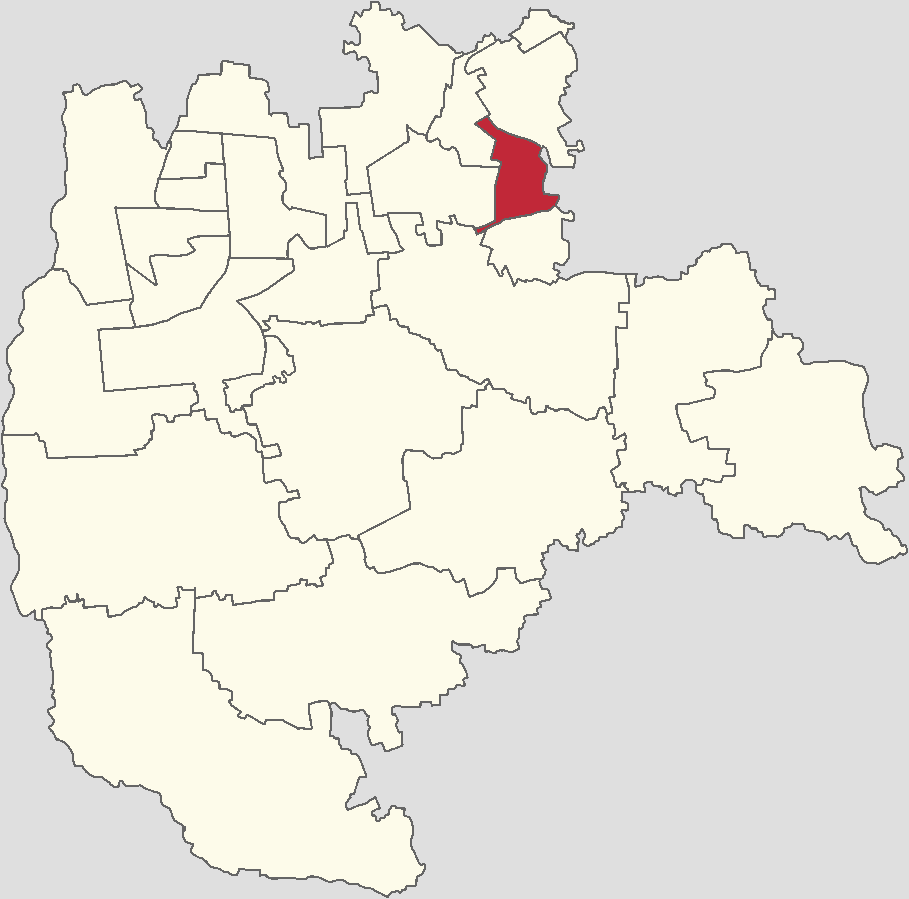
- Location of Boxing Subdistrict in Daxing District

- Location within Beijing Location within China
- Coordinates: 39°45′42″N 116°29′38″E
- Country: China
- Municipality: Beijing
- District: Daxing
- Village-level Divisions: 1 community

Area
  - Total: 24 km^{2} (9.3 sq mi)
- Elevation: 32 m (105 ft)
- Time zone: UTC+8 (China Standard)
- Postal code: 102676
- Area code: 010

Boxing Subdistrict (simplified Chinese: 博兴街道; traditional Chinese: 博興街道; pinyin: Bóxīng Jiēdào) is a subdistrict located at the northeast of Daxing District, Beijing, China. It constitututed part of Beijing Economic-Technological Development Area, and is under the administration of the area. It borders Ronghua Subdistrict in the north, Majuqiao Town in the east, Yinghai Town in the south and west, and Qingyundian Town in the southwest. It was founded from portions of Yizhuang Town and Yinghai Town in 2014.

== Administrative divisions ==
By the end of 2021, there was only one residential community within Boxing Subdistrict: Zhongxin Huayuan Community (中芯花园社区). Its Administrative Division Code was 110115013001.

== Gallery ==
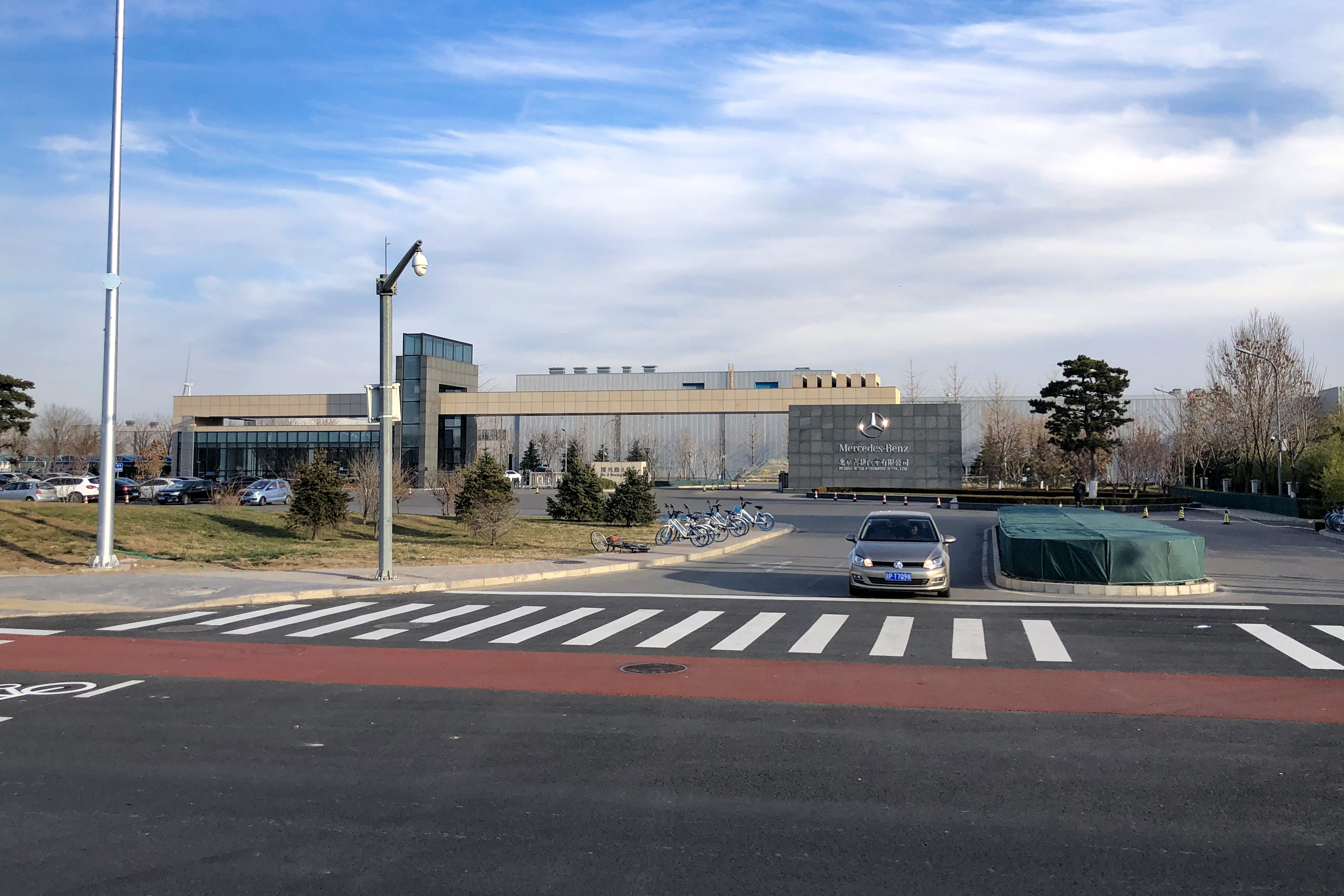
Beijing Benz Automotive Co Ltd, 2020

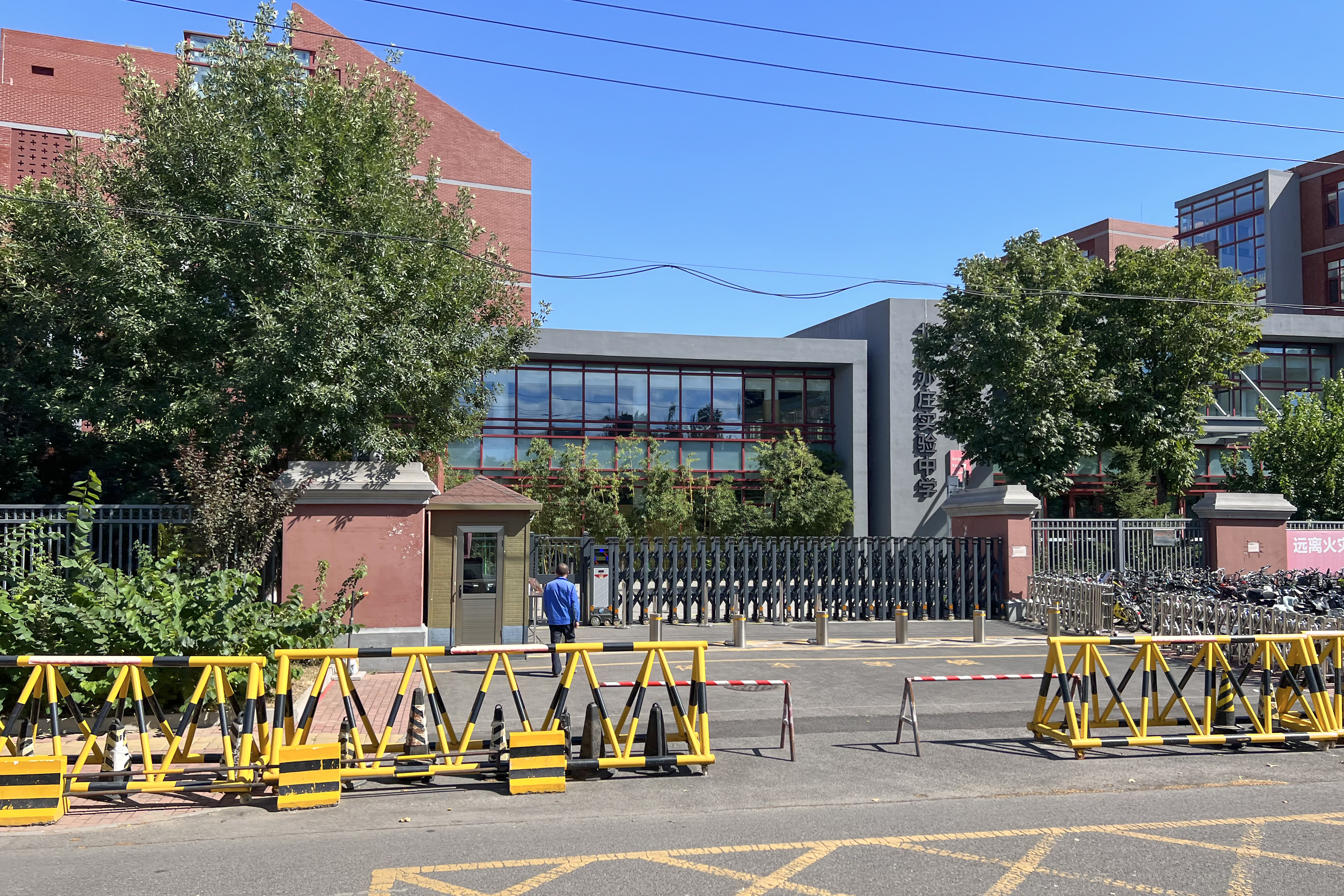
Beijing Etown Academy, 2022

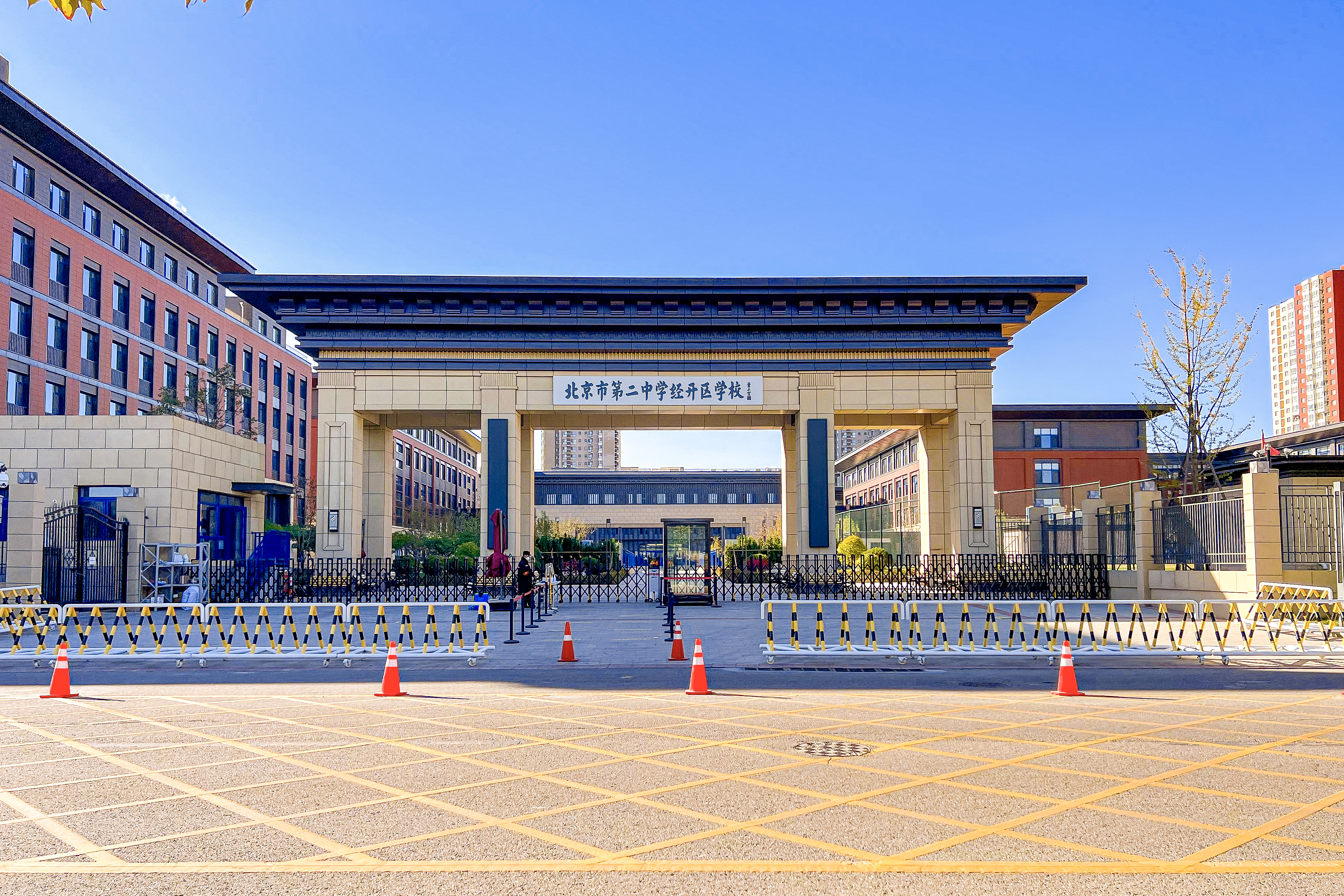
Beijing Development Area Campus of Beijing No. 2 Middle School, 2022

== See also ==
- List of township-level divisions of Beijing
