= Taihu, Beijing =

Taihu Town 台湖镇
- Town
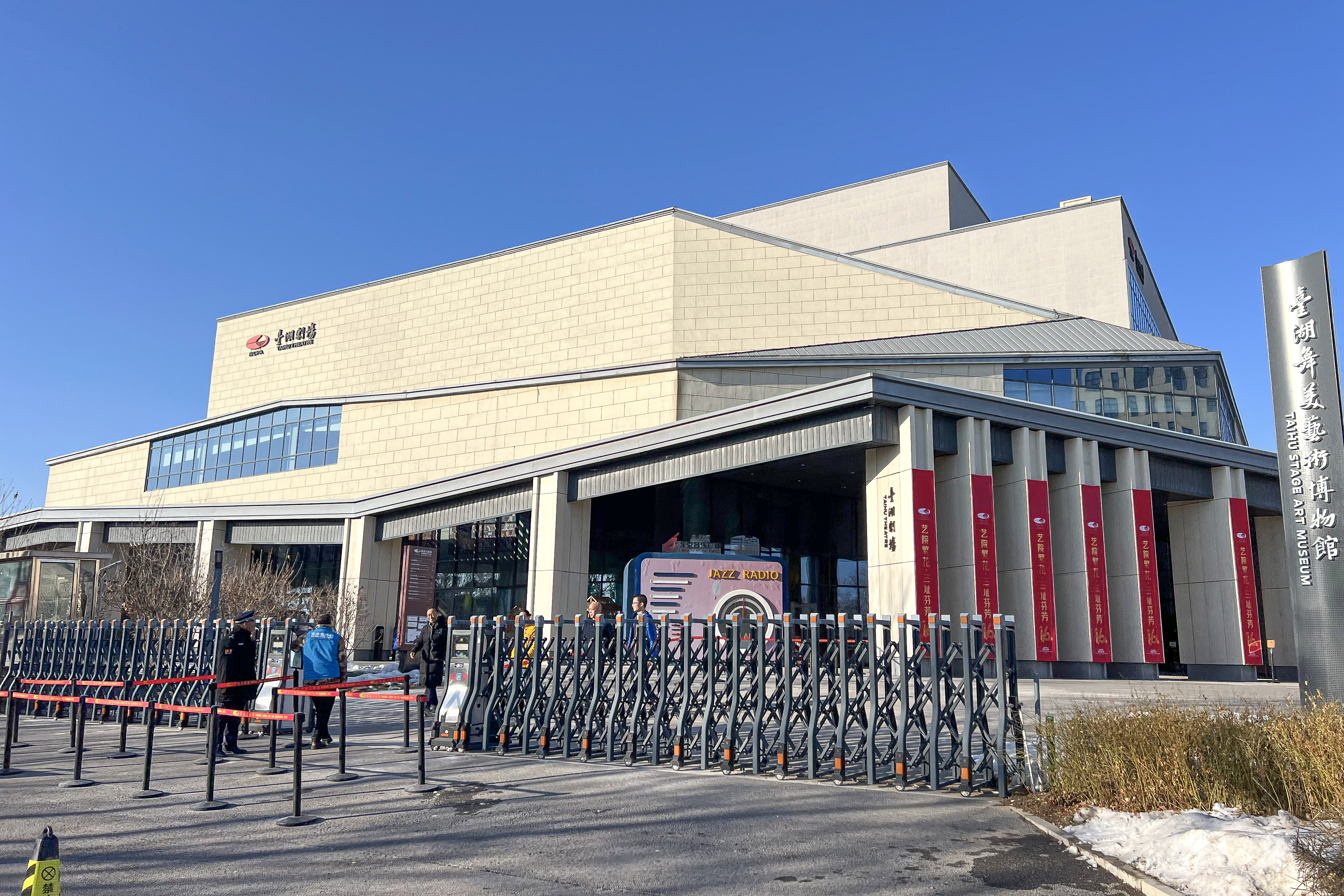
- Taihu Theater of the National Center for the Performing Arts, 2023

- Location within Beijing Location within China
- Coordinates: 39°49′51″N 116°38′46″E
- Country: China
- Municipality: Beijing
- District: Tongzhou
- Village-level Divisions: 6 communities 41 villages

Area
  - Total: 81.5 km^{2} (31.5 sq mi)

Population (2020)
  - Total: 151,735
  - Density: 1,860/km^{2} (4,820/sq mi)
- Time zone: UTC+8 (China Standard)
- Postal code: 101116
- Area code: 010

Taihu Town (simplified Chinese: 台湖镇; traditional Chinese: 臺湖鎮; pinyin: Táihú Zhèn) is a town located in the west side of Tongzhou District, Beijing, China. It shares borders with Dougezhuang, Heizhuanghu Townships and Liyuan Town in the north, Zhangjiawan Town in the east, Majuqiao Town in the south, Beijing Economic-Technological Development Area in the southwest, Yizhuang Town and Shibalidian Township in the northwest. In 2020, population of the town was 151,735.

The name Taihu (Chinese: 台湖; pinyin: Táihú; lit. 'Tai Lake') comes from Tai Lake within the town, which was formed during the Liao dynasty.

== History ==
Timetable of Taihu Town
Year	Status	Within
1914 – 1936	6th District	Tong County
1936 – 1946	5th Policing District	Tong County
1946 – 1948	Sanjianfang Township	Tong County
1948 – 1956	6th District	Tong County
1956 – 1958	Taihu Township	Tong County
1958 – 1961	Part of Zhangjiawan People's Commune	Tong County
1961 – 1983	Taihu People's Commune	Tong County
1983 – 1997	Taihu Township	Tong County
1997 – 2000	Taihu Township	Tongzhou District
2000–present	Taihu Town (Incorporated Ciqu Town in 2001)	Tongzhou District

== Administration divisions ==
As of 2021, Taihu Town was subdivided into 47 divisions. 6 of them were communities, while the other 41 were villages:

Administrative division code	Subdivision names	Name transliteration	Type
110112114001	定海园一里	Dinghaiyuan Yili	Community
110112114002	定海园二里	Dinghaiyuan Erli	Community
110112114003	润枫领尚	Runfeng Lingshang	Community
110112114004	拾景园	Shijingyuan	Community
110112114005	印象北里	Yinxiang Beili	Community
110112114006	印象南里	Yinxiang Nanli	Community
110112114201	台湖	Taihu	Village
110112114202	铺头	Putou	Village
110112114203	朱家垡	Zhujiafa	Village
110112114204	田家府	Tianjiafu	Village
110112114205	前营	Qianying	Village
110112114206	口子	Kouzi	Village
110112114207	江场	Jiangchang	Village
110112114208	胡家垡	Hujiafa	Village
110112114209	周坡庄	Zhoupozhuang	Village
110112114210	外郎营	Wailangying	Village
110112114211	玉甫上营	Yufushangying	Village
110112114212	蒋辛庄	Jiangxinzhuang	Village
110112114213	东下营	Dong Xiaying	Village
110112114214	西下营	Xi Xiaying	Village
110112114215	北火垡	Bei Huofa	Village
110112114216	唐大庄	Tangdazhuang	Village
110112114217	北姚园	Bei Yaoyuan	Village
110112114218	碱厂	Jianchang	Village
110112114219	尖垡	Jianfa	Village
110112114220	兴武林	Xingwulin	Village
110112114221	窑上	Yaoshang	Village
110112114222	次一	Ciyi	Village
110112114223	次二	Ci'er	Village
110112114224	垛子	Duozi	Village
110112114225	永隆屯	Yonglongtun	Village
110112114226	桂家坟	Guijiafen	Village
110112114227	大地	Dadi	Village
110112114228	徐庄	Xuzhuang	Village
110112114229	新河	Xinhe	Village
110112114230	高古庄	Gaoguzhuang	Village
110112114231	桑元	Sangyuan	Village
110112114232	水南	Shuinan	Village
110112114233	董村	Dongcun	Village
110112114234	北神树	Bei Shenshu	Village
110112114235	丁庄	Dingzhuang	Village
110112114236	白庄	Baizhuang	Village
110112114237	马庄	Mazhuang	Village
110112114240	东石	Dongshi	Village
110112114241	麦庄	Maizhuang	Village
110112114242	西太平庄	Xi Taipingzhuang	Village
110112114246	北小营	Bei Xiaoying	Village

== Economics ==
In the year 2018, Taihu Town's total tax revenue was 2.55 billion Chinese Yuan, and the disposable income per capital was ¥30,323.

== Gallery ==
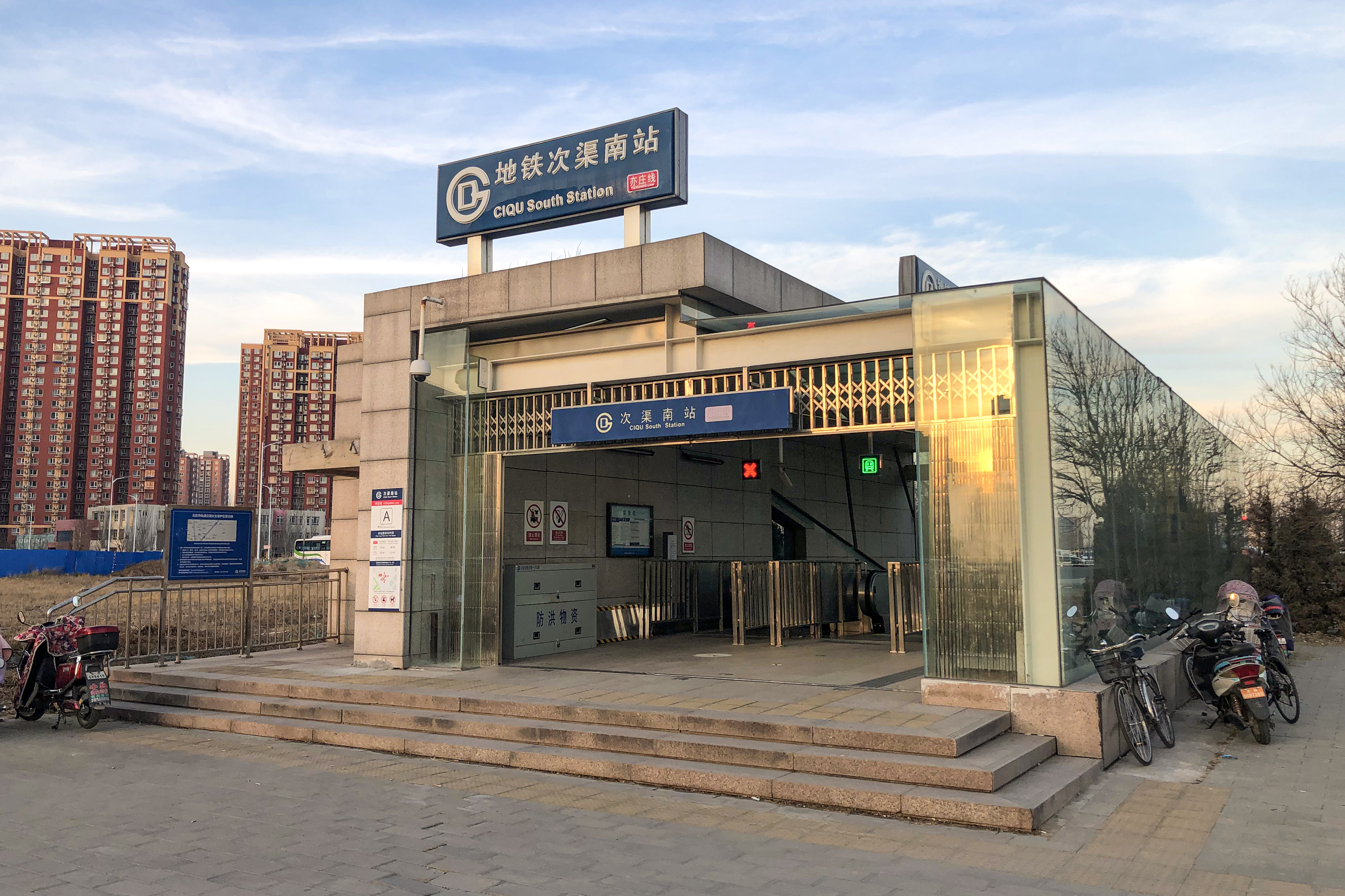
Ciqu South Station of Beijing Subway, 2021

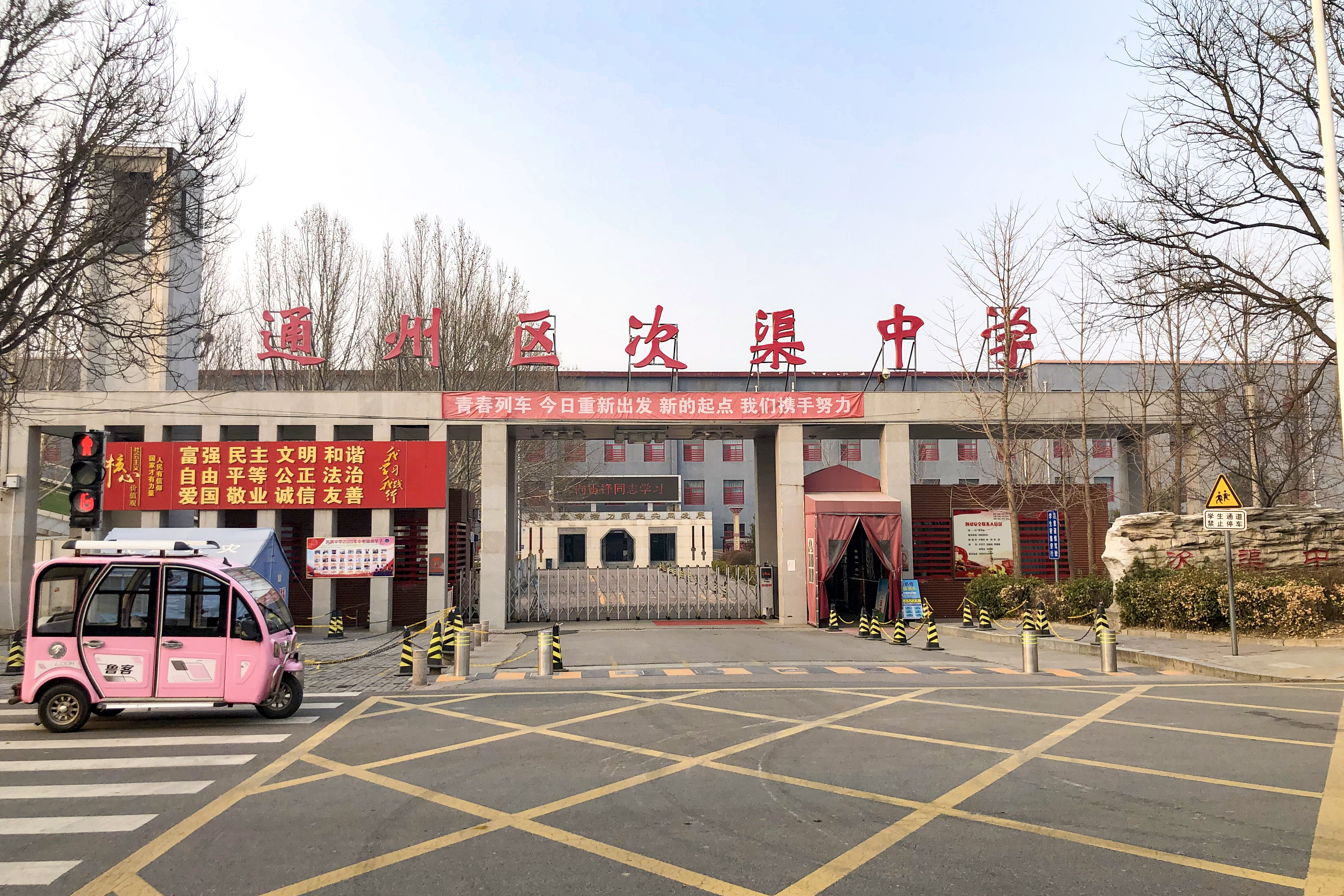
Ciqu Middle School, 2021

== See also ==
- List of township-level divisions of Beijing
