= Beijing Economic-Technological Development Area =

Beijing Economic-Technological Development Area 北京经济技术开发区 Yizhuang Development Area (亦庄开发区) Yizhuang New Town (亦庄新城)
- Township-level Division
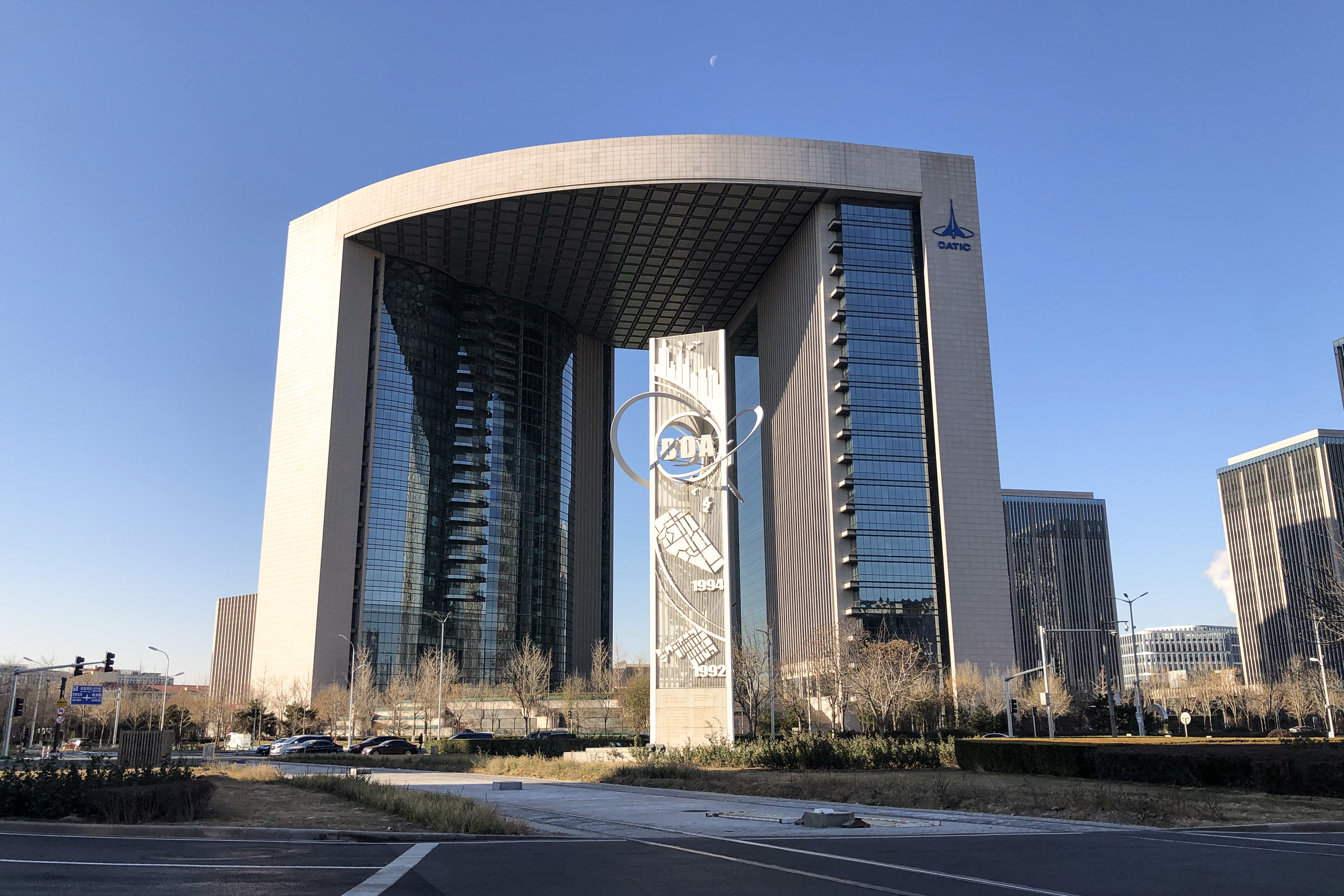
- CATIC Plaza, 2020

- Location within Beijing Location within China
- Coordinates: 39°47′43″N 116°30′24″E
- Country: China
- Municipality: Beijing
- District: Daxing

Area
  - Total: 59.02 km^{2} (22.79 sq mi)

Population (2020)
  - Total: 148,145
  - Density: 2,510/km^{2} (6,501/sq mi)
- Time zone: UTC+8 (China Standard)
- Area code: 010

Beijing Economic-Technological Development Area (BETDA or BDA) (simplified Chinese: 北京经济技术开发区; traditional Chinese: 北京經濟技術開發區; pinyin: Běijīng Jīngjì Jìshù Kāifāqū) is a state-level economic and technological development zone in Beijing, China. The area is developed by Beijing E-Town, an economic development and investment initiative of the Beijing Municipal People's Government.

It is located in Yizhuang, the southeast suburb of Beijing, with the Jingjintang Expressway nearby on its east, with the Beijing–Tianjin Intercity Rail and the Fifth Ring Road in the north and the Sixth Ring Road in the south. The pillar industries in the zone include pharmaceuticals, information technology, mechanic and electronic products and new materials. As of 2020, it had a total population of 148,145.

== History ==
BETDA was created in 1994, starting out as a 10 km^{2} plot of land in the southeast suburb of Beijing.

== Administrative divisions ==
In 2020, there are 2 subdistricts that falls under the direct jurisdiction of BETDA: Boxing and Ronghua.

== Gallery ==
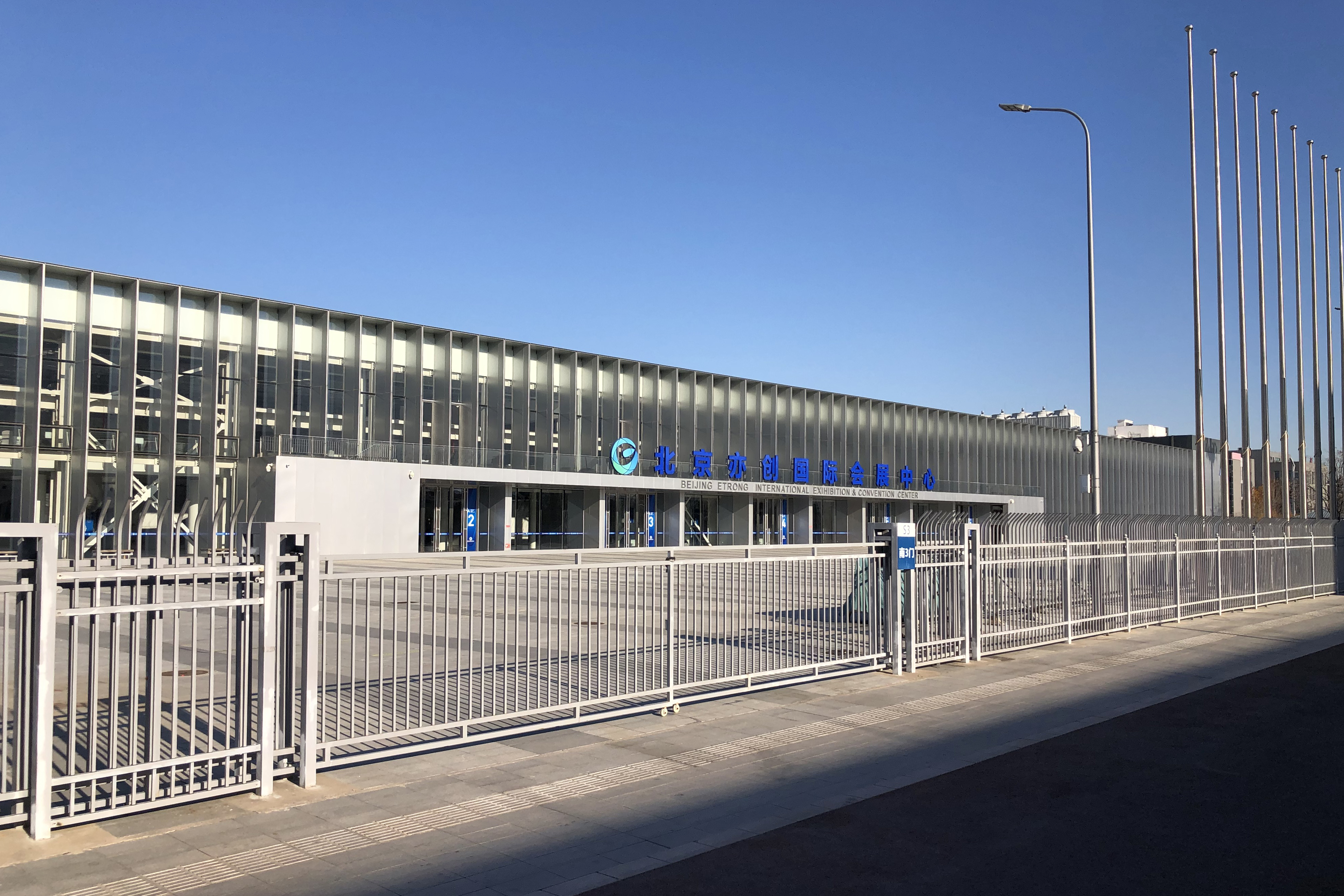
Beijing Etrong International Exhibition & Convention Center, 2020

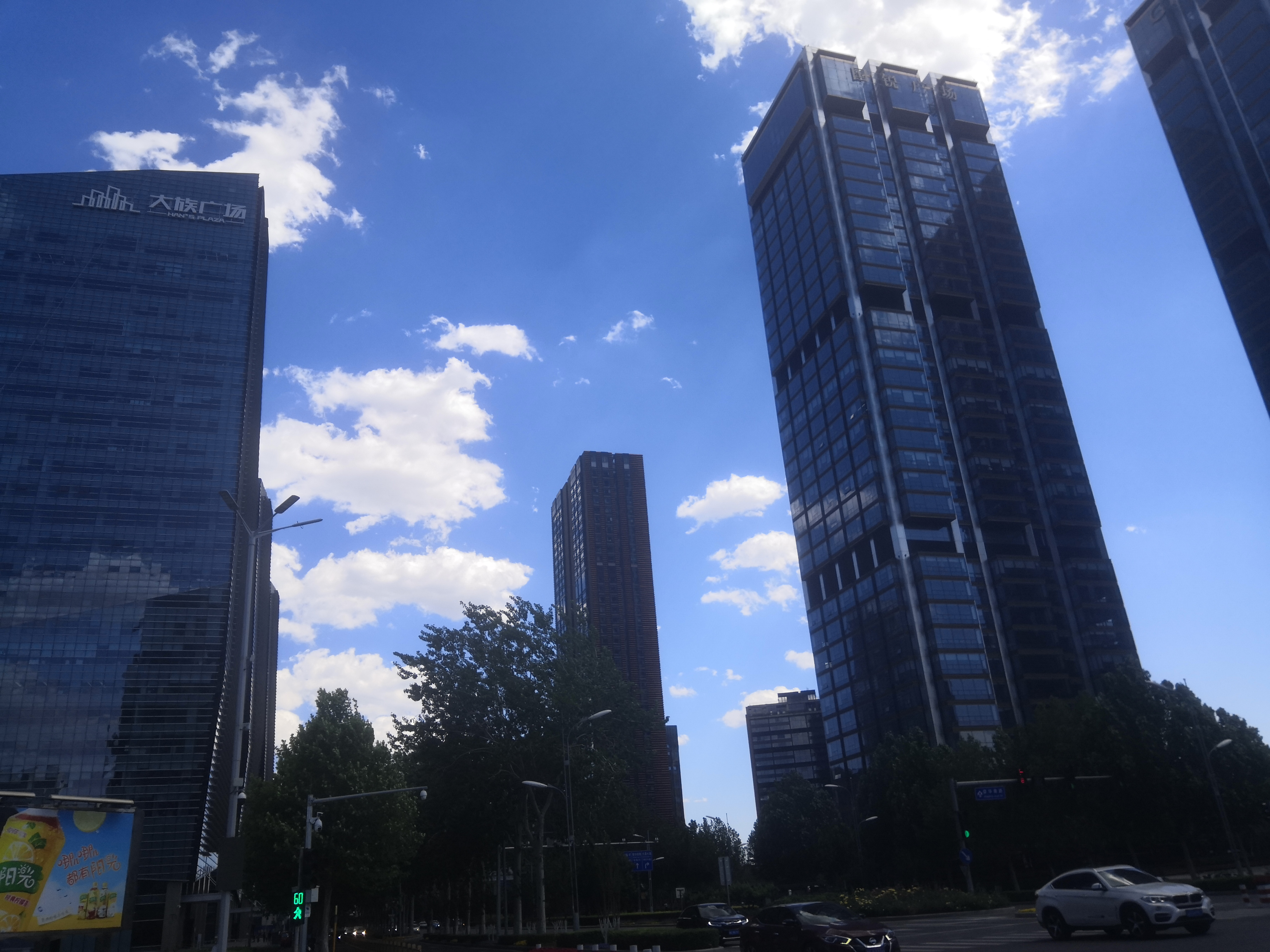
Buildings along Ronghua Middle Road, 2020

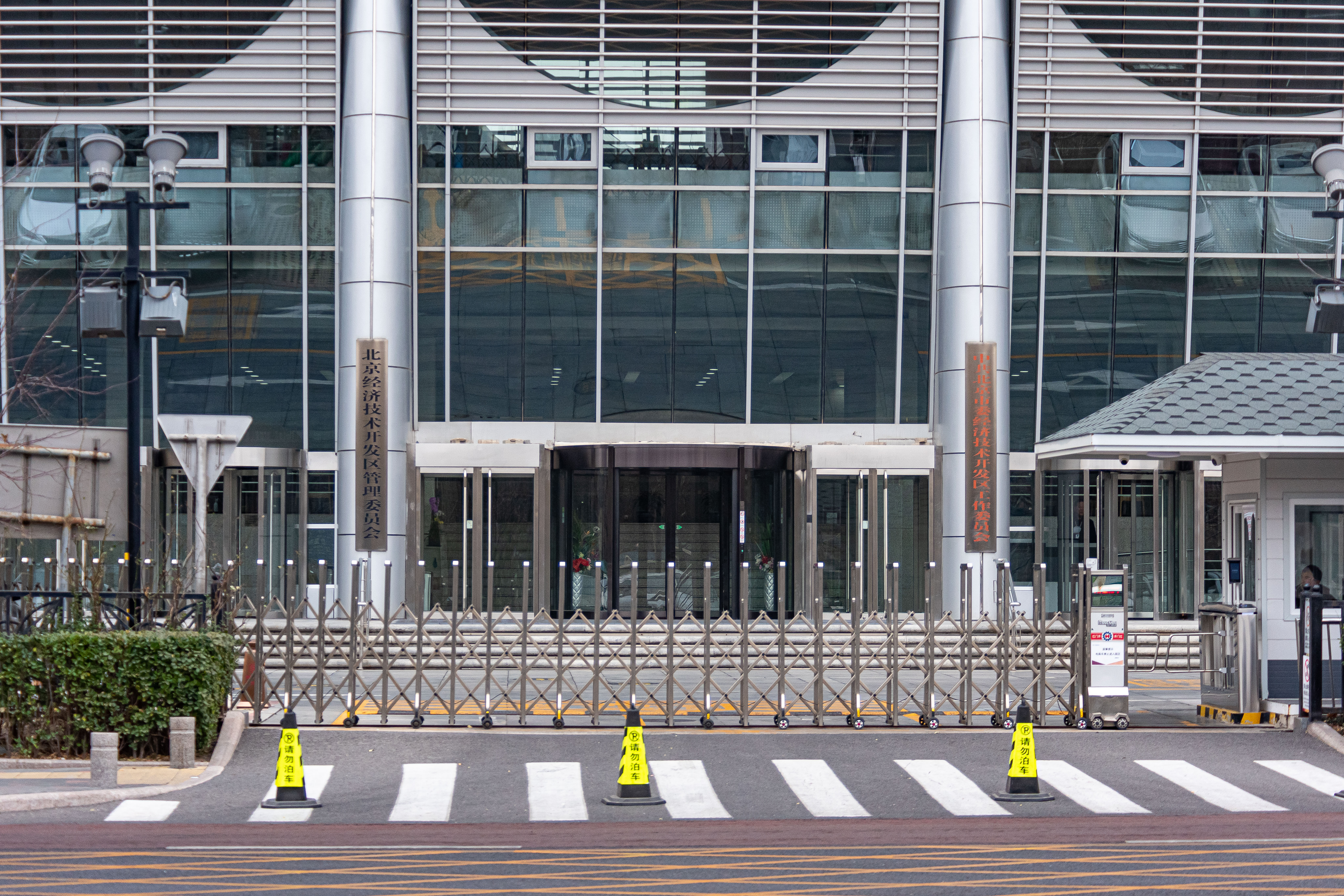
Administrative committee of BDA, 2024

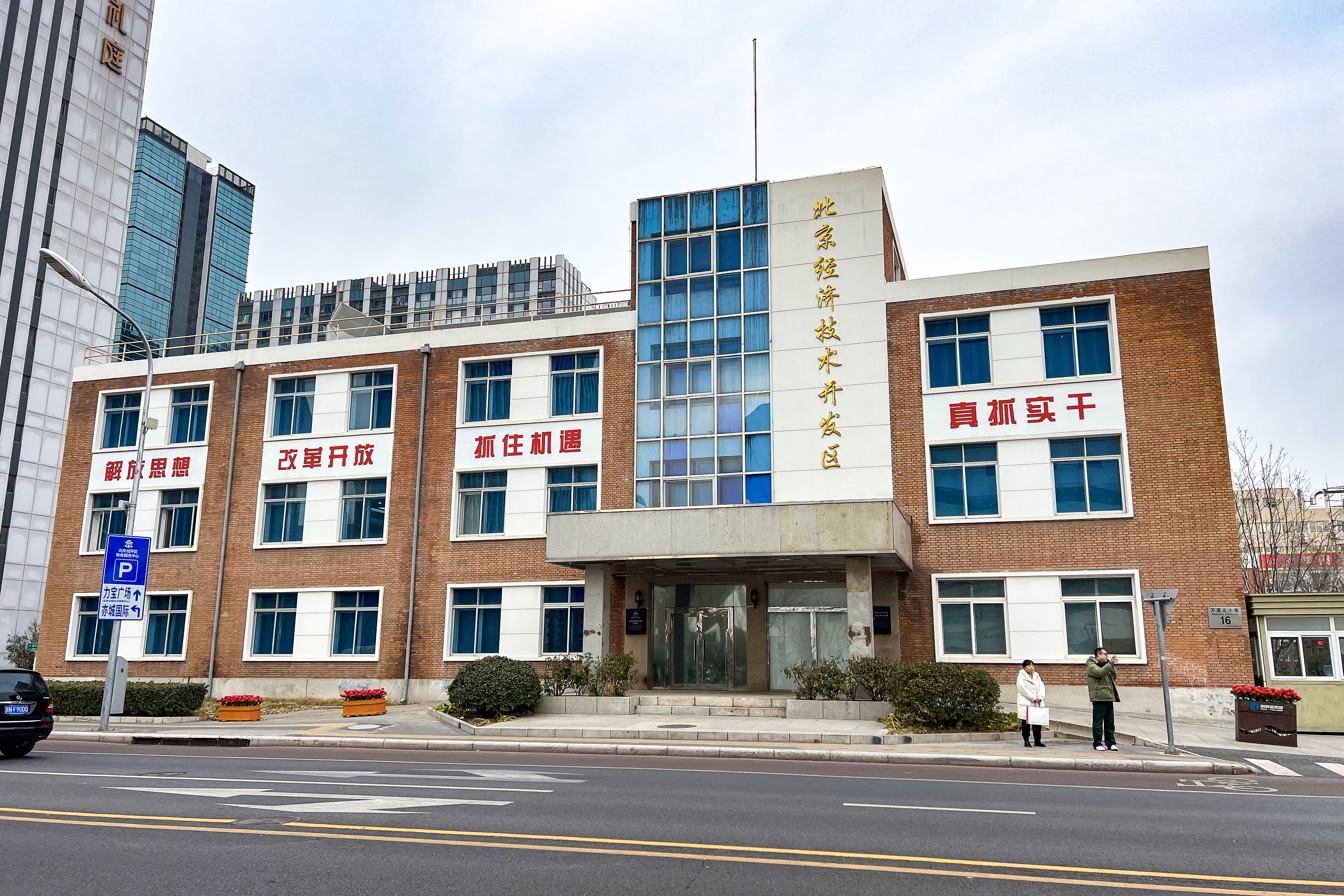
History museum of BDA, 2024
