= Yizhuang, Beijing =

Yizhuang Area 亦庄地区 Yizhuang Town（亦庄镇）
- Area & Town
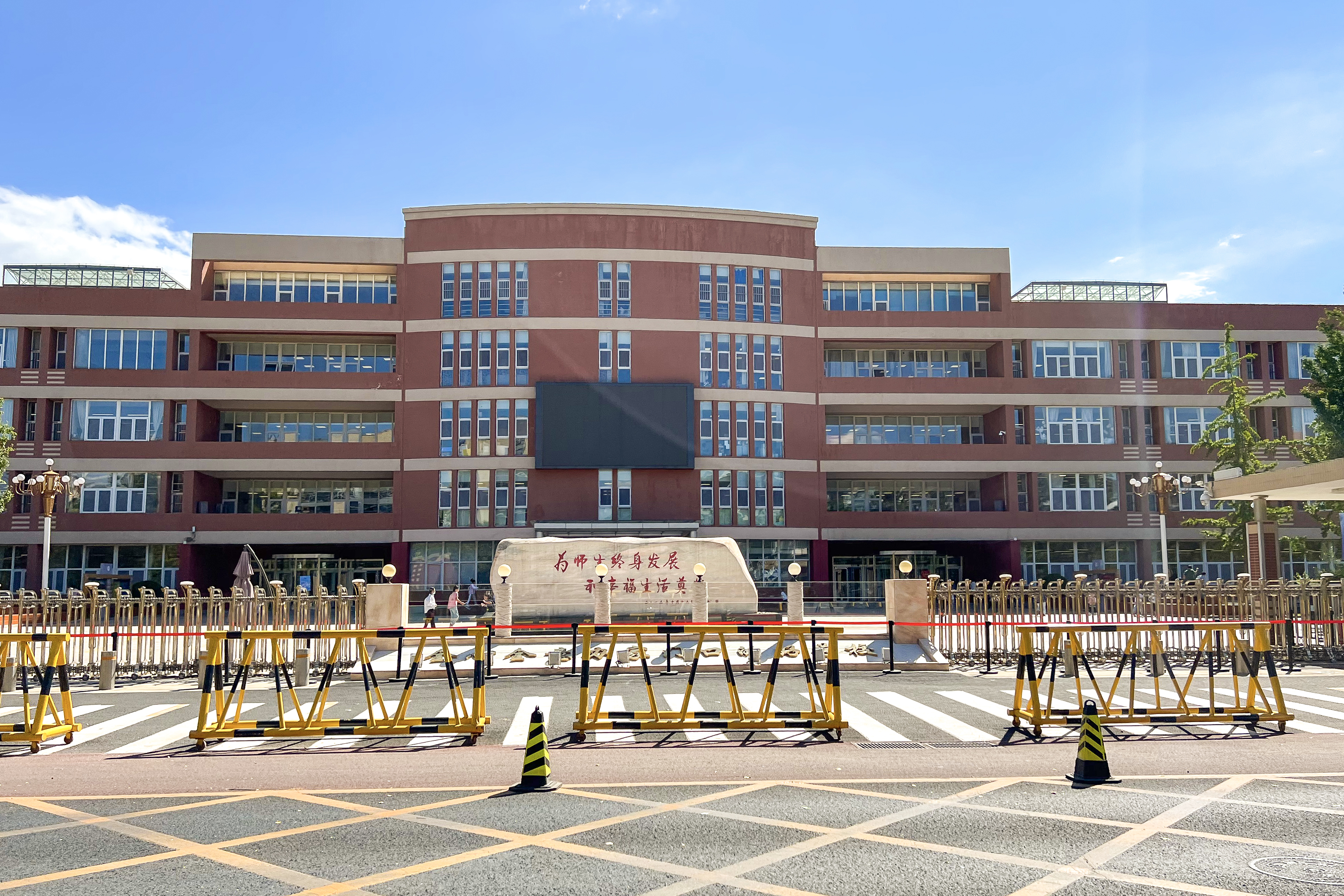
- Beijing Development Area School of RDFZ, 2022

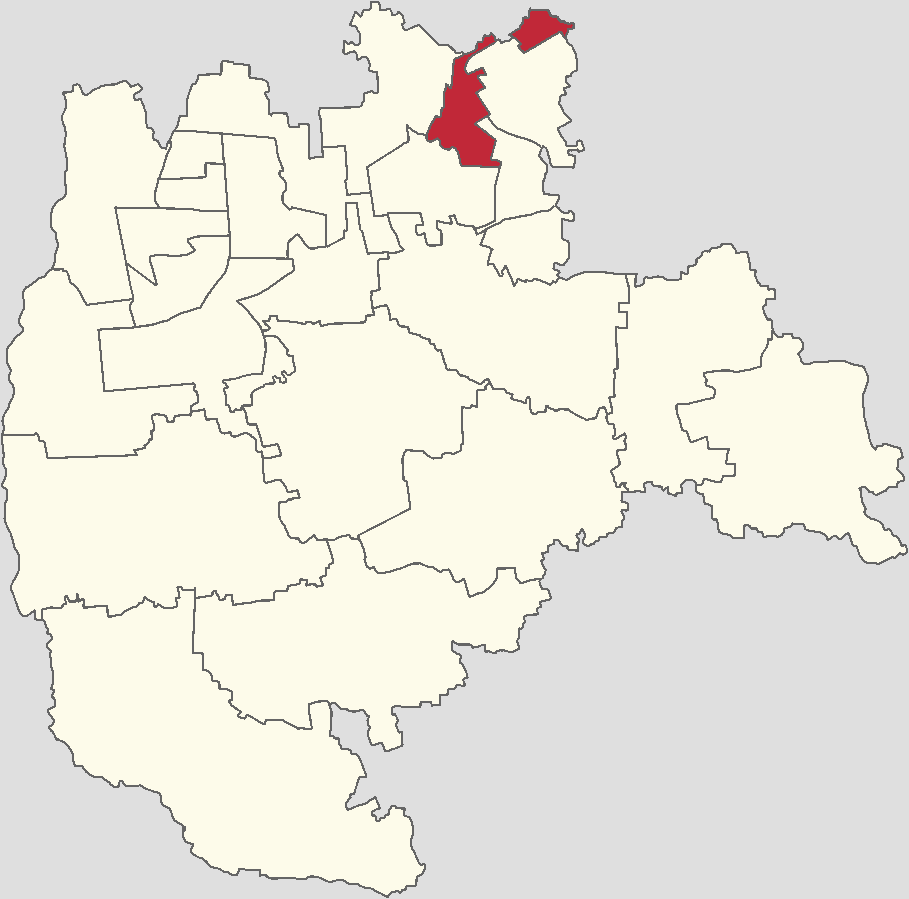
- Location in Daxing District

- Location within Beijing Location within China
- Coordinates: 39°47′57″N 116°28′32″E
- Country: China
- Municipality: Beijing
- District: Daxing
- Village-level Divisions: 19 communities 5 villages 2 industrial areas

Area
  - Total: 15.25 km^{2} (5.89 sq mi)
- Elevation: 36 m (118 ft)

Population (2020)
  - Total: 108,255
  - Density: 7,099/km^{2} (18,390/sq mi)
- Time zone: UTC+8 (China Standard)
- Postal code: 102676
- Area code: 010

Yizhuang Area (simplified Chinese: 亦庄地区; traditional Chinese: 亦莊地區; pinyin: Yìzhuāng Dìqū) is an area and a town of Daxing District, in the southeast suburbs of Beijing, located just outside the 5th Ring Road. Beijing Economic-Technological Development Area (BDA), the biggest economic and technical area is located here. There are a lot of high-tech research centers and joint ventures. As of 2020, It had a census population of 108,255.

== History ==
History of Yizhuang Area
Year	Status	Belonged to
1913–1953		Daxing County, Hebei
1953–1958	Luquan Township	Daxing County, Hebei
1958–1963	Nanjiao Farm	Daxing County, Hebei
1963–1983	Yizhuang Production Team, part of Hongxing People's Commune	Daxing County, Hebei
1983–1984	Yizhuang Production Team	Daxing County, Hebei
1984–2000	Yizhuang Township	Daxing County, Hebei
2000–2001	Yizhuang Town (Merged with Lujuan Township in 2000)	Daxing County, Hebei
2001–2005	Yizhuang Town (Merged with Lujuan Township in 2000)	Daxing District
2005–present	Yizhuang Area (Yizhuang Town)	Daxing District

== Administrative divisions ==
As of the time in writing, Yizhuang Area comprises 26 subdivisions, consisting of 19 residential communities, 5 villages and 2 industrial areas:

Administrative division code	Subdivision names	Name transliteration	Type
110115004001	贵园北里	Guiyuan Beili	Community
110115004002	贵园东里	Guiyuan Dongli	Community
110115004003	贵园南里	Guiyuan Nanli	Community
110115004005	富源里	Fuyuanli	Community
110115004007	泰河园	Taiheyuan	Community
110115004008	晓康	Xiaokang	Community
110115004009	广德苑	Guangdeyuan	Community
110115004015	星岛社区	Xingdao Shequ	Community
110115004016	三羊里	Sanyangli	Community
110115004017	泰河园一里	Taiheyuan Yili	Community
110115004018	泰河园七里	Taiheyuan Qili	Community
110115004019	开泰东里	Kaitai Dongli	Community
110115004020	三羊东里	Sanyang Dongli	Community
110115004021	鹿华苑二里	Luhuayuan Erli	Community
110115004022	鹿华苑一里	Luhuayuan Yili	Community
110115004023	贵园西里	Guiyuan Xili	Community
110115004024	鹿海园	Luhaiyuan	Community
110115004025	鹿华苑三里	Luhuayuan Sanli	Community
110115004026	鹿华苑四里	Luhuayuan Sili	Community
110115004200	鹿圈一村	Lujuan Yicun	Village
110115004201	鹿圈二村	Lujuan Ercun	Village
110115004202	鹿圈三村	Lujuan Sancun	Village
110115004203	鹿圈四村	Lujuan Sicun	Village
110115004207	宝善庄村	Baoshanzhuang Cun	Village
110115004401	亦庄镇东	Yizhuangzhen Dong	Industrial Area
110115004402	亦庄镇南部	Yizhuangzhen Nanbu	Industrial Area

== See also ==
- List of township-level divisions of Beijing
