= Yancun, Beijing =

Yancun Town 阎村镇
- Town
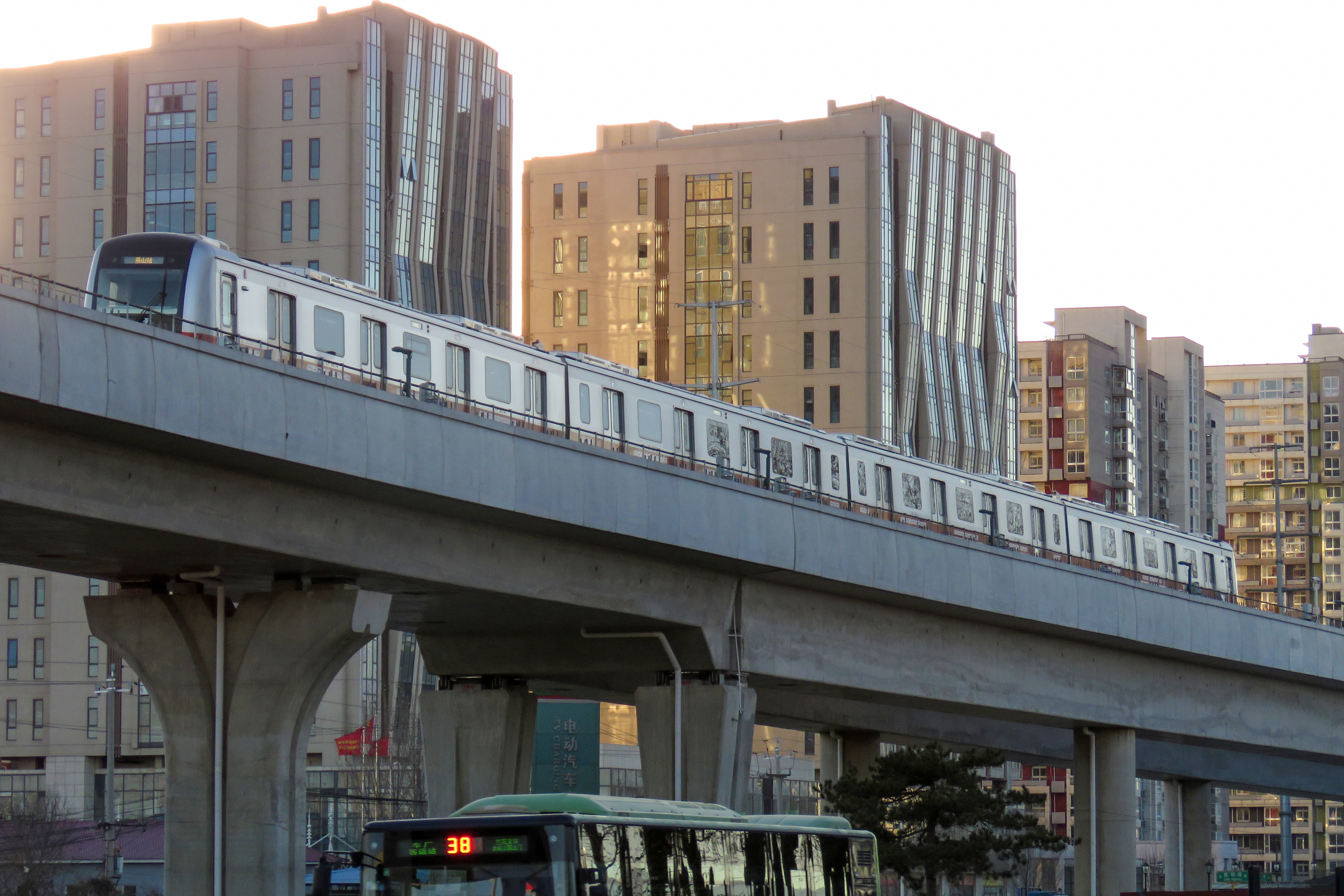
- Yanfang line of the Beijing Subway passing through Yancun, 2017

- Location within Beijing Location within China
- Coordinates: 39°42′53″N 116°05′04″E
- Country: China
- Municipality: Beijing
- District: Fangshan
- Village-level Divisions: 8 communities 22 villages

Area
  - Total: 45.62 km^{2} (17.61 sq mi)

Population (2020)
  - Total: 77,621
  - Density: 1,701/km^{2} (4,407/sq mi)
- Time zone: UTC+8 (China Standard)
- Postal code: 102412
- Area code: 010

Yancun Town (Chinese: 阎村镇; pinyin: Yáncūn Zhèn) is a town situated in the eastern part of Fangshan District, Beijing, China. It borders Xinzhen Subdistrict and Qinglonghu Town in its north, Xilu, Gongchen Subdistricts and Liangxiang Town in its east, Doudian Town in the south, Chengguan Subdistrict in the west, and contains Xingcheng Subdistrict as well as an exclave of Xinzhen Subdistrict within. It is home to 77,621 residents as of 2020.

The name came to be during the reign of Yongle Emperor of Ming dynasty. At the time eight families with the surname Yan moved here from Zhuozhou, and thus the settlement was known as Yancun (Chinese: 阎村; lit. 'Yan Village').

== History ==
Timeline of Yancun Town
Year	Status
1916	Within the 8th Northern District of Liangxiang County
1950	Within the 2nd District
1956	Within Xiaodongcun and Da Shisanli Townships
1958	Within Da Zicaowu Township
1960	Within Da Zicaowu Management District, Liangxiang People's Commune
1961	Within Zicaowu People's Commune, Fangshan County
1983	Zicaowu People's Commune was changed to Zicaowu Township
1994	Changed to Yancun Town (闫村镇)
2008	Renamed to Yancun Town (阎村镇)

== Administrative Divisions ==
In 2021, there were 30 subdivisions within Yancun Town, including 8 communities and 22 villages:

Administrative division code	Subdivision names	Name transliteration	Type
110111101001	梨园东里	Liyuan Dongli	Community
110111101002	消防器材厂	Xiaofang Qicaichang	Community
110111101003	桥梁厂	Qiaoliangchang	Community
110111101004	绿城	Lücheng	Community
110111101005	万紫嘉园	Wnzi Jiayuan	Community
110111101006	乐活家园	Lehuo Jiayuan	Community
110111101007	紫园	Ziyuan	Community
110111101008	云瑞嘉园	Yunduan Jiayuan	Community
110111101200	大紫草坞	Da Zicaowu	Village
110111101201	小紫草坞	Xiao Zicaowu	Village
110111101202	前沿	Qianyan	Village
110111101203	后沿	Houyan	Village
110111101204	张庄	Zhangzhuang	Village
110111101205	公主坟	Gongzhufen	Village
110111101206	北坊	Beifang	Village
110111101207	南坊	Nanfang	Village
110111101208	吴庄	Wuzhuang	Village
110111101209	焦庄	Jiaozhuang	Village
110111101210	大董	Dadong	Village
110111101211	小董	Xiaodong	Village
110111101212	西坟	Xifen	Village
110111101213	开古庄	Kaiguzhuang	Village
110111101214	南梨园	Nanliyuan	Village
110111101215	二合庄	Erhezhuang	Village
110111101216	大十三里	Da Shisanli	Village
110111101217	小十三里	Xiao Shisanli	Village
110111101218	后十三里	Hou Shisanli	Village
110111101219	肖庄	Xiaozhuang	Village
110111101220	元武屯	Yuanwutun	Village
110111101221	炒米店	Chaomidian	Village

== See also ==
- List of township-level divisions of Beijing
