= Hebei, Beijing =

Hebei Town 河北镇
- Town
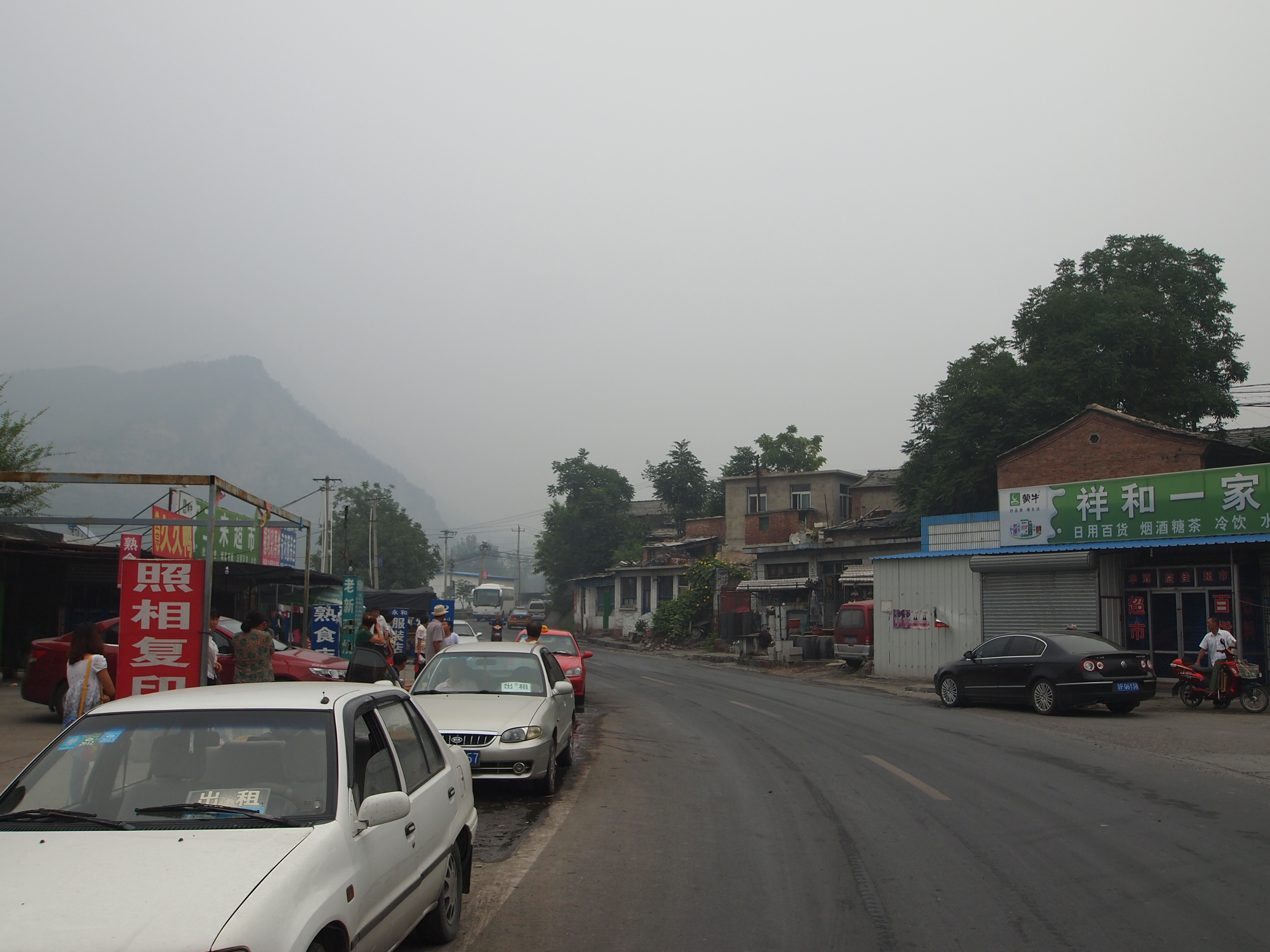
- Hebei Town in 2012

- Location within Beijing Location within China
- Coordinates: 39°49′07″N 115°55′58″E
- Country: China
- Municipality: Beijing
- District: Fangshan
- Village-level Divisions: 3 communities 19 villages

Area
  - Total: 69.2 km^{2} (26.7 sq mi)

Population (2020)
  - Total: 18,895
  - Density: 273/km^{2} (707/sq mi)
- Time zone: UTC+8 (China Standard)
- Postal code: 102417
- Area code: 010

Hebei Town (Chinese: 河北镇; pinyin: Héběi Zhèn) is a town under the administration of Fangshan District, Beijing, China. It borders Tanzhesi Town to its north, Qinglonghu Town to its east, Dongfeng and Xiangyang Subdistricts to its south, and Fozizhuang Town to its west. As of 2020, it had a total population of 18,895.

The Wanfo Hall, Kongshuidong Stone Carvings and Pagoda cultural relics are in Wanfotang Village in Hebei Town.

== History ==
Timeline of Hebei Town
Year	Status
1916	Belonged to the 4th District of Fangshan County
1949	Belonged to the 8th District
1952	Belonged to Hebei District of Jingxi Mining Area
1953	Set up as Hebei Township
1958	Merged with Huaguoshan and Baihuashan to form Hebei People's Commune, under Zhoukoudian District
1960	Under Fangshan County
1980	Under Gongnong District, part of Beijing Bureau of Mining Affairs
1983	Converted to a township
1989	Converted to a town
1992	Transferred to Fangshan District

== Administrative divisions ==
At the end of 2021, Hebei Town had 22 subdivisions under its jurisdiction, including 3 communities and 19 villages:

Administrative division code	Subdivision names	Name transliteration	Type
110111107001	房山矿	Fangshankuang	Community
110111107002	黄土坡军工路	Huangtupo Jungonglu	Community
110111107003	惠景新苑	Huijing Xinyuan	Community
110111107200	磁家务	Cijiawu	Village
110111107201	万佛堂	Wanfotang	Village
110111107202	半壁店	Banbidian	Village
110111107203	黄土坡	Huangtupo	Village
110111107204	三福	Sanfu	Village
110111107205	河东	Hedong	Village
110111107206	东庄子	Dongzhuangzi	Village
110111107207	檀木港	Tanmugang	Village
110111107208	三十亩地	Sanshimudi	Village
110111107209	东港	Donggang	Village
110111107210	李各庄	Ligezhuang	Village
110111107211	河北	Hebei	Village
110111107212	河南	Henan	Village
110111107213	辛庄	Xinzhuang	Village
110111107214	南道	Nandao	Village
110111107215	杏元	Xinyuan	Village
110111107216	口儿	Kou'er	Village
110111107217	他窖	Tajiao	Village
110111107218	南车营	Nancheying	Village

== See also ==
- List of township-level divisions of Beijing
