= Hancunhe =

Hancunhe Town 韩村河镇
- Town
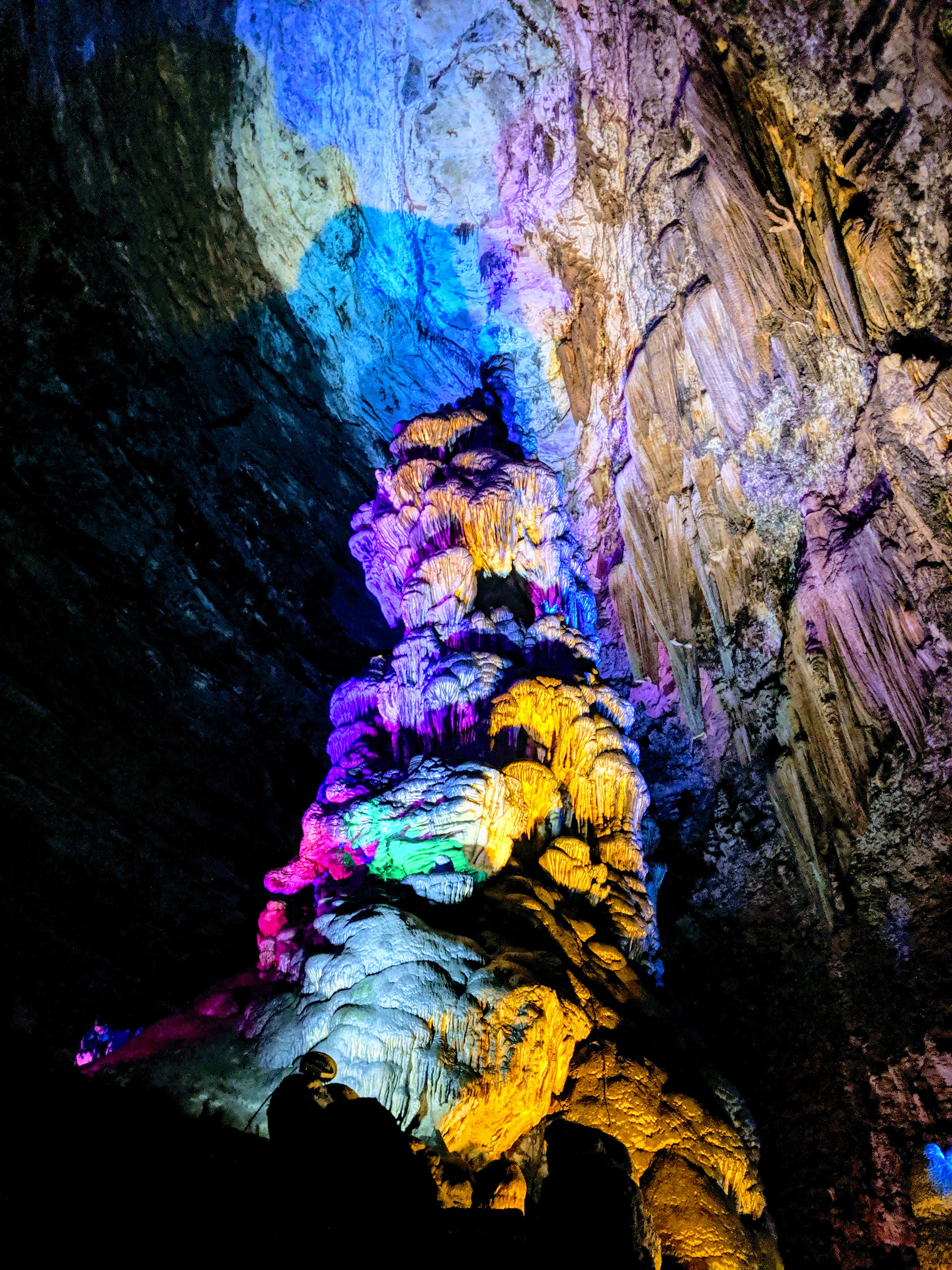
- Shuiyun Cave of Shanfang Mountain, on the northwest of the town, 2019

- Location within Beijing Location within China
- Coordinates: 39°36′03″N 115°58′00″E
- Country: China
- Municipality: Beijing
- District: Fangshan
- Village-level Divisions: 1 community 27 villages

Area
  - Total: 101.4 km^{2} (39.2 sq mi)

Population (2020)
  - Total: 37,435
  - Density: 369.2/km^{2} (956.2/sq mi)
- Time zone: UTC+8 (China Standard)
- Postal code: 102406
- Area code: 010

Hancunhe Town (Chinese: 韩村河镇; pinyin: Háncūnhé Zhèn) is a town situated on southern side of Fangshan District, Beijing, China. It borders Xiayunling, Zhoukoudian and Shilou Towns in the north, Liulihe Town in the east, Zhuozhou City and Changgou Town in the south, Dashiwo and Zhangfang Towns in the west. Its population was 37,435 as of 2020.

== History ==
Timetable of Hancunhe Town
Year	Status	Within
1916 - 1949	6th District (六区)	Fangshan County (房山县)
1949 - 1954	4th District (四区)	Fangshan County (房山县)
1954 - 1956	Split into 11 townships: Caozhang (曹章); Xidong (西东); Gushankou (孤山口); Shengshuiyu (圣水峪); Zhongyuan (中院); Wuhou (五候); Zhaogezhuang (赵各庄); Nanzhang (南章); Hancunhe (韩村河); Longmenkou (龙门口); Zhougezhuang (周各庄)	Fangshan County (房山县)
1956 - 1958	Split into 4 townships: Xidong, Wuhou, Shengshuiyu and Gushankou	Fangshan County (房山县)
1958 - 1960	Integrated into Changgou People's Commune (长沟人民公社)	Zhoukoudian District (周口店区)
1960 - 1964	Wuhou People's Commune Tiankai People's Commune (天开人民公社) Zhaogezhuang People's Commune	Fangshan County
1964 - 1981	Yuegezhuang People's Commune (岳各庄人民公社) Zhaogezhuang People's Commune	Fangshan County
1981 - 1983	Yuegezhuang People's Commune Dongying People's Commune	Fangshan County
1983 - 1986	Yuegezhuang Township Dongying Township	Fangshan County
1986 - 1999	Yuegezhuang Township Dongying Township	Fangshan District
1999 - 2001	Yuegezhuang Township Hancunhe Town	Fangshan District
2001–present	Hancunhe Town	Fangshan District

== Administrative Divisions ==
In 2021, Hancunhe Town had 28 subdivisions, more specifically 1 community and 27 villages:

Administrative division code	Subdivision names	Name transliteration	Type
110111115001	大自然新城	Daziran Xincheng	Community
110111115200	东营	Dongying	Village
110111115201	赵各庄	Zhaogezhuang	Village
110111115202	西营	Xiying	Village
110111115203	小次洛	Xiaociluo	Village
110111115204	韩村河	Hancunhe	Village
110111115205	西东	Xidong	Village
110111115206	曹章	Caozhang	Village
110111115207	七贤	Qixian	Village
110111115208	潘家庄	Panjiazhuang	Village
110111115209	郑庄	Zhengzhuang	Village
110111115210	崇义	Chongyi	Village
110111115211	五侯	Wuhou	Village
110111115212	岳各庄	Yuegezhuang	Village
110111115213	尤家坟	Youjiafen	Village
110111115214	东南章	Dong Nanzhang	Village
110111115215	西南章	Xi Nanzhang	Village
110111115216	龙门口	Longmenkou	Village
110111115217	二龙岗	Erlonggang	Village
110111115218	皇后台	Huanghoutai	Village
110111115219	天开	Tiankai	Village
110111115220	东周各庄	Dong Zhougezhuang	Village
110111115221	西周各庄	Xi Zhougezhuang	Village
110111115222	上中院	Shangzhongyuan	Village
110111115223	下中院	Xiazhongyuan	Village
110111115224	孤山口	Gushankou	Village
110111115225	圣水峪	Shengshuiyu	Village
110111115226	罗家峪	Luojiayu	Village

== See also ==
- List of township-level divisions of Beijing
