= Yingfeng Subdistrict =

Yingfeng Subdistrict 迎风街道
- Subdistrict
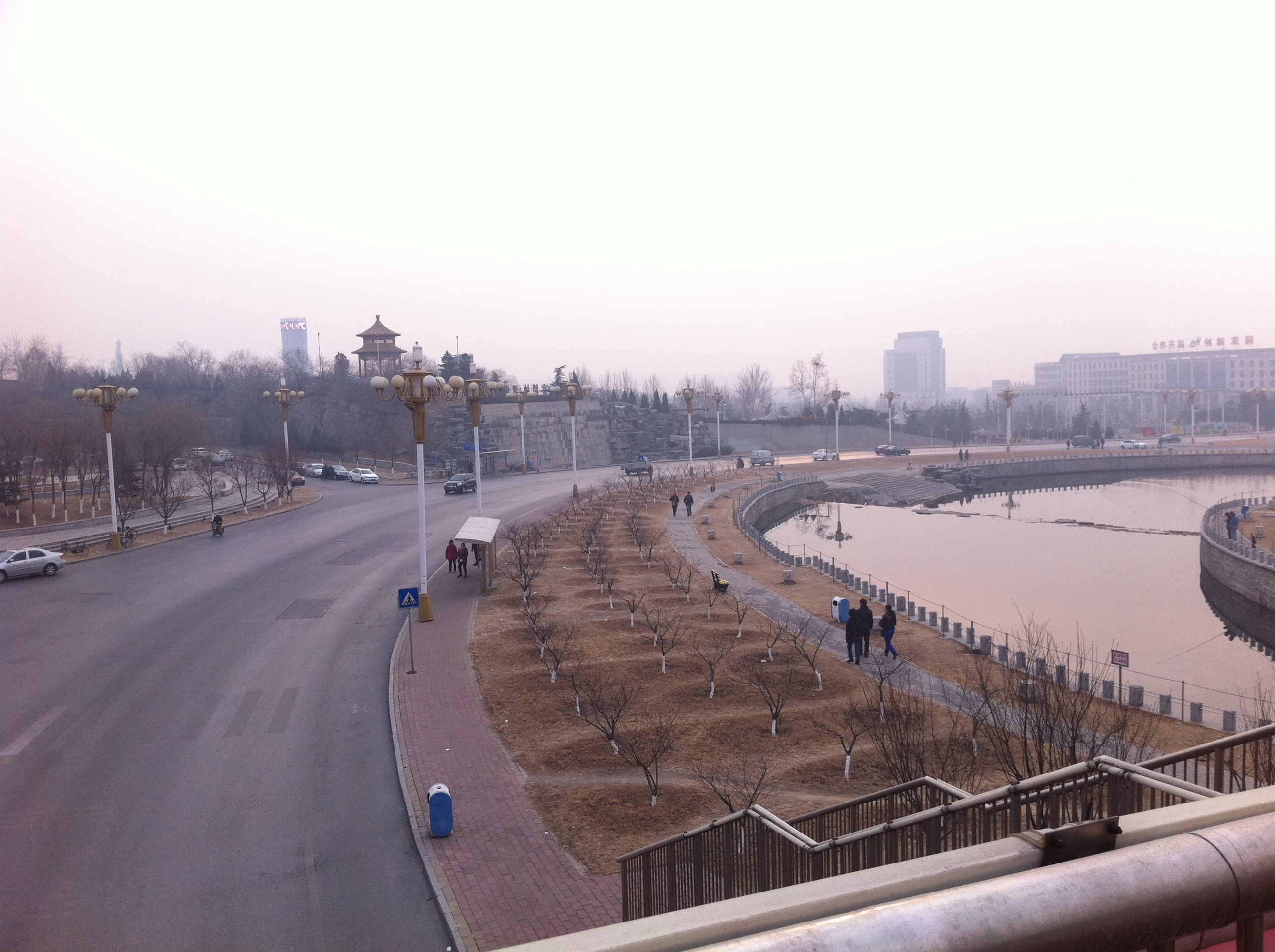
- Area around Yanshan Petrochemical Plant, within Yingfeng Subdistrict, 2015

- Location within Beijing Location within China
- Coordinates: 39°43′25″N 115°56′50″E
- Country: China
- Municipality: Beijing
- District: Fangshan
- Village-level Divisions: 11 communities

Area
  - Total: 7.78 km^{2} (3.00 sq mi)

Population (2020)
  - Total: 34,721
  - Density: 4,460/km^{2} (11,600/sq mi)
- Time zone: UTC+8 (China Standard)
- Postal code: 102500
- Area code: 010

Yingfeng Subdistrict (Chinese: 迎风街道; pinyin: Yíngfēng Jiēdào) is a subdistrict on the eastern portion of Fangshan District, Beijing, China. It shares border with Xiangyang Subdistrict in the north, Chengguan Subdistrict in the other three directions, and an exclave of Yingfeng borders Zhoukoudian Town in the west. Its population was 34,721 as of 2020.

The subdistrict was formed in 1983 after separating from Xiangyang Subdistrict. Its name Yingfeng (Chinese: 迎风; lit. 'Facing the Wind') originated from a slope of the south of the region.

== Administrative Divisions ==
As of 2021, Yingfeng Subdistrict had direct jurisdiction over the following 11 communities:

Administrative division code	Subdivision names	Name transliteration
110111006001	高家坡	Gaojiapo
110111006002	迎风四里	Yingfeng Sili
110111006004	迎风五里	Yingfeng Wuli
110111006006	杏花西里	Xinghua Xili
110111006008	杏花东里	Xinghua Dongli
110111006009	迎风六里	Yingfeng Liuli
110111006014	迎风西里	Yingfeng Xili
110111006015	杰辉苑	Jiehuiyuan
110111006016	迎风一里	Yingfeng Yili
110111006017	凤凰亭	Fenghuangting
110111006018	幸福家园	Xingfu Jiayuan

== See also ==
- List of township-level divisions of Beijing
