= Dongfeng Subdistrict, Beijing =

Dongfeng Subdistrict 东风街道
- Subdistrict
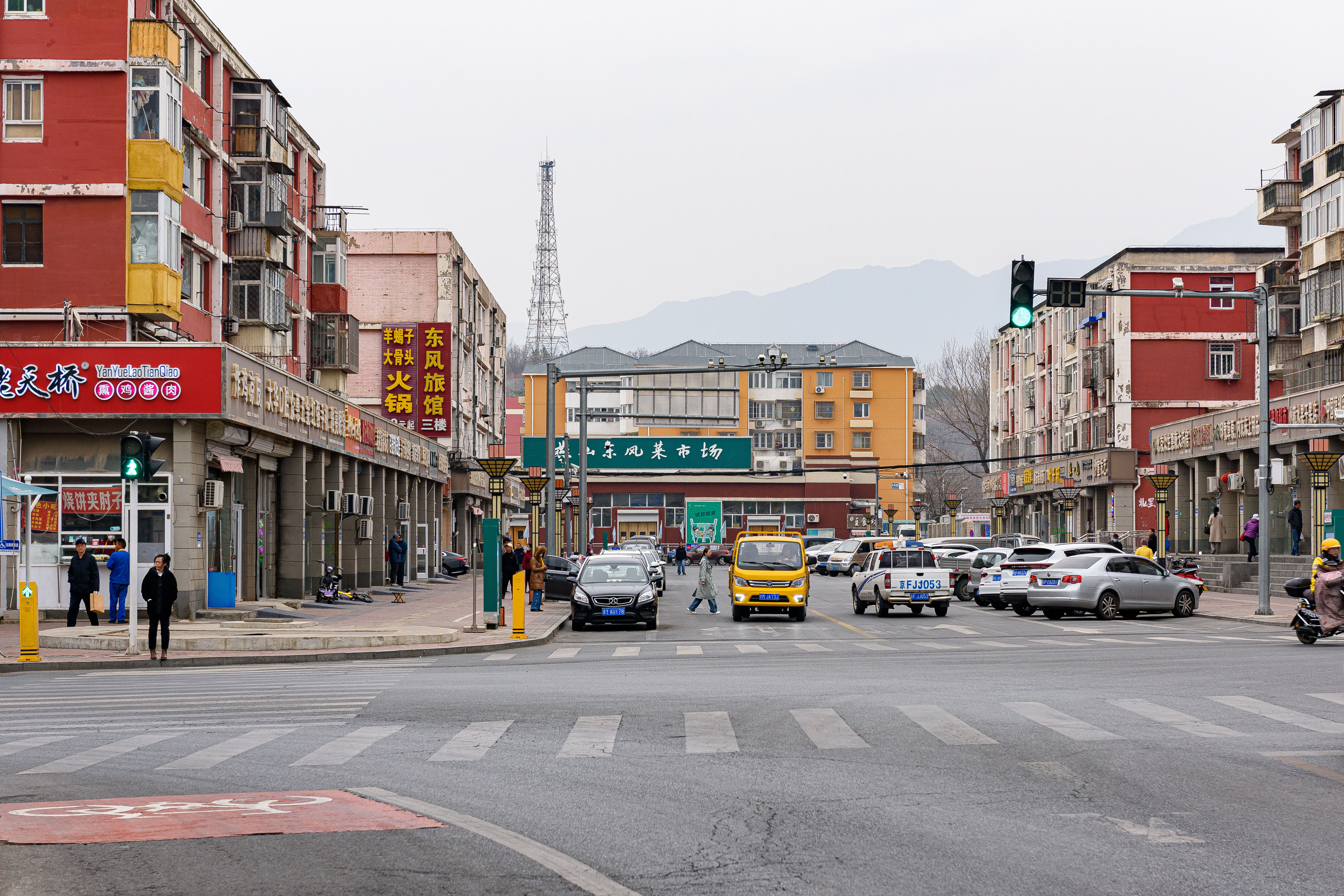
- Dongwan Rd. within the subdistrict, 2024

- Location within Beijing Location within China
- Coordinates: 39°45′16″N 115°57′30″E
- Country: China
- Municipality: Beijing
- District: Fangshan
- Village-level Divisions: 8 communities

Area
  - Total: 15.97 km^{2} (6.17 sq mi)

Population (2020)
  - Total: 22,556
  - Density: 1,412/km^{2} (3,658/sq mi)
- Time zone: UTC+8 (China Standard)
- Postal code: 102502
- Area code: 010

Dongfeng Subdistrict (Chinese: 东风街道; pinyin: Dōngfēng Jiēdào) is a subdistrict located on the northeastern side of Fangshan District, Beijing, China. It borders Hebei Town to its north, Qinglonghu Town and Chengguan Subdistrict to its east, and Xiangyang Subdistrict to its south and west. It had a population of 22,556 as of the 2020 census.

The name Dongfeng (Chinese: 东风; lit. 'Eastern Wind') came from Dongfeng Chemical Factory within the subdistrict.

== History ==
Timetable of Dongfeng Subdistrict
Year	Status
1976	Dongfeng Subdistrict was formed
1980	Part of Yanshan District
1986	Part of Fangshan District

== Administrative Divisions ==
In the year 2021, Dongfeng Subdistrict had 8 communities under its administration:

Administrative division code	Subdivision names	Name transliteration
110111005001	南里	Nanli
110111005003	东里	Dongli
110111005004	北里	Beili
110111005007	羊耳峪北里	Yang'eryu Beili
110111005010	羊耳峪里第一	Yang'eryuli Diyi
110111005011	羊耳峪里第二	Yang'eryuli Di'er
110111005012	羊耳峪西区	Yang'eryu Xiqu
110111005013	燕和园	Yanheyuan

== See also ==
- List of township-level divisions of Beijing
