= Xiayunling Township =

Xiayunling Township 霞云岭乡
- Township
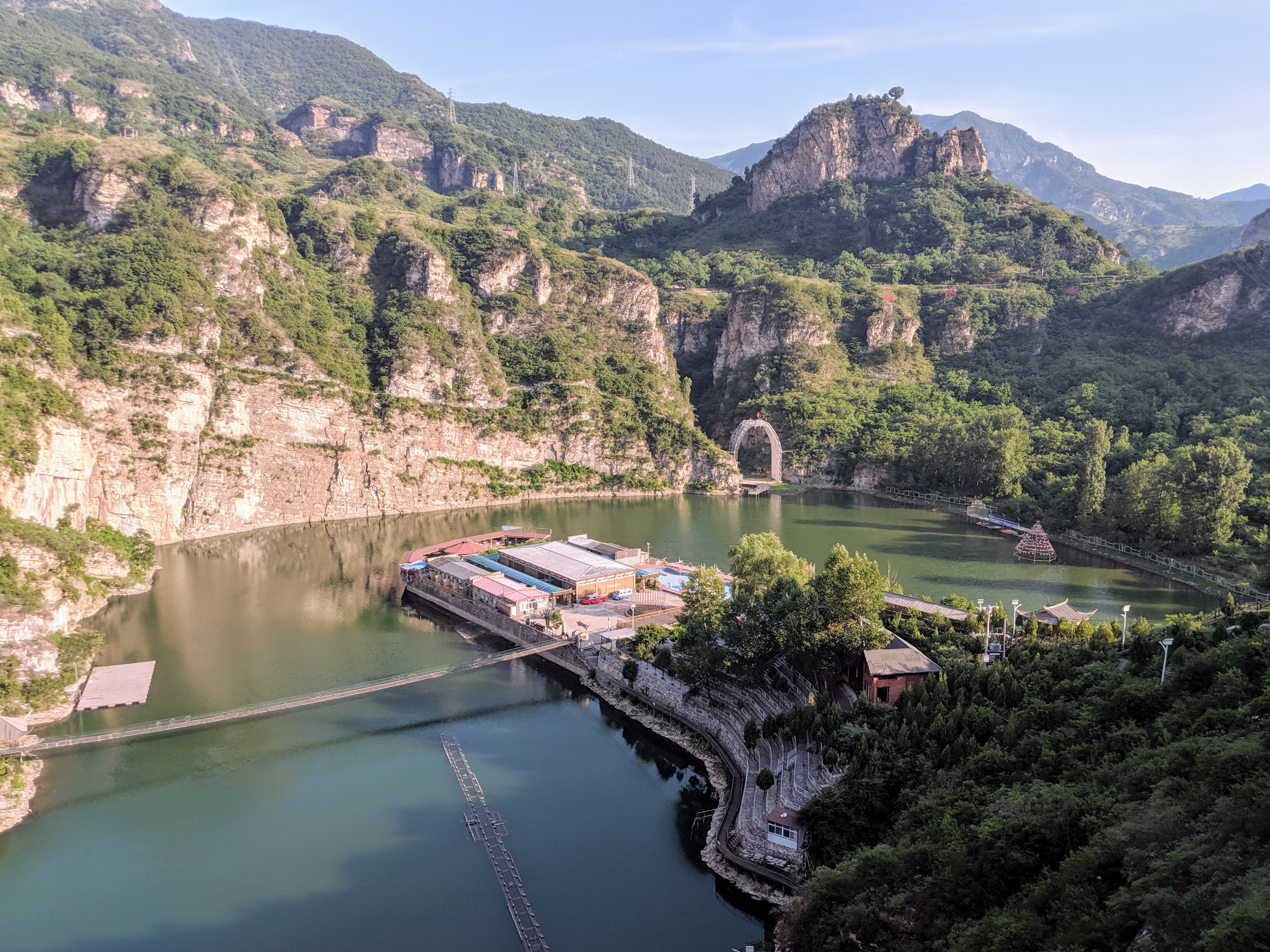
- Jinshui Lake within the township, 2019

- Location within Beijing Location within China
- Coordinates: 39°43′59″N 115°44′18″E
- Country: China
- Municipality: Beijing
- District: Fangshan
- Village-level Divisions: 15 villages

Area
  - Total: 206.3 km^{2} (79.7 sq mi)

Population (2020)
  - Total: 4,885
  - Density: 23.68/km^{2} (61.33/sq mi)
- Time zone: UTC+8 (China Standard)
- Postal code: 102421
- Area code: 010

Xiayunling Township (Chinese: 霞云岭乡; pinyin: Xiáyúnlǐng Xiāng) is a township located inside of Fangshan District, Beijing, China. It borders Qingshui, Shijiaying and Fozizhuang Townships in its north, Nanjiao and Zhoukoudian Towns in its east, Hancunhe, Zhangfang and Shidu Towns in its south, Puwa and Beibianqiao Towns in its west. In 2020, the population of Xiayunling was 4,885.

== History ==
Timetable of Xiayunling Township
Time	Status	Under
Qing dynasty	Shenning Township (神宁乡)	Fangshan County (房山县)
1916 - 1938	9th District (九区)	Fangshan County (房山县)
1938 - 1941	1st District (一区)	Fangliang Lianhe County (房良联合县)
1941 - 1944	9th District	Fanglaizhuo Lianhe County (房涞涿联合县)
1944 - 1949	9th District	Fangshan County
1949 - 1950	1st District	Fangshan County
1950 - 1954	6th District	Fangshan County
1954 - 1956	Split among 10 townships: Longmentai (龙门台); Zhuanghutai (庄户台); Simatai (四马台); Sanliushui (三流水); Xiayunling (霞云岭); Shibantai (石板台); Shang Shibao (上石堡); Xia Shibao (下石堡); Dacaoling (大草蛉); Beizhihe (北直河)	Fangshan County
1958 - 1958	Split among 8 townships: Tangshang (堂上); Longmentai; Xiayunling; Shibantai; Beizhihe; Xiashibao	Fangshan County
1958 - 1961	Xiayunling People's Commune	Zhoukoudian District (周口店区)
1961 - 1983	Xiayunling People's Commune	Fangshan County
1983 - 1986	Xiayunling Township	Fangshan County
1986–present	Xiayunling Township	Fangshan District

== Administrative Divisions ==
In the year 2021, there were 15 villages within Xiayunling Township:

Administrative division code	Subdivision names	Name transliterations
110111208200	堂上	Tangshang
110111208201	大地港	Dadigang
110111208202	四马台	Simatai
110111208203	龙门台	Longmentai
110111208204	庄户台	Zhuanghutai
110111208205	王家台	Wangjiatai
110111208206	石板台	Shibantai
110111208207	四合	Sihe
110111208208	霞云岭	Xiayunling
110111208209	三流水	Sanliushui
110111208210	大草岭	Dacaoling
110111208211	上石堡	Shang Shibao
110111208212	北直河	Beizhihe
110111208213	下石堡	Xia Shibao
110111208214	银水	Yinshui

== Climate ==
Xiayunling Township has a humid continental climate (Köppen climate classification Dwa).

Climate data for Xiayunling, elevation 408 m (1,339 ft), (1991–2020 normals, extremes 1981–present)
Month	Jan	Feb	Mar	Apr	May	Jun	Jul	Aug	Sep	Oct	Nov	Dec	Year
Record high °C (°F)	14.2 (57.6)	20.1 (68.2)	28.3 (82.9)	31.9 (89.4)	36.7 (98.1)	37.1 (98.8)	37.8 (100.0)	36.0 (96.8)	34.8 (94.6)	30.1 (86.2)	22.7 (72.9)	20.0 (68.0)	37.8 (100.0)
Mean daily maximum °C (°F)	2.1 (35.8)	5.4 (41.7)	11.8 (53.2)	19.5 (67.1)	25.5 (77.9)	28.9 (84.0)	29.8 (85.6)	28.9 (84.0)	24.8 (76.6)	18.5 (65.3)	10.1 (50.2)	3.5 (38.3)	17.4 (63.3)
Daily mean °C (°F)	−4.9 (23.2)	−1.4 (29.5)	5.1 (41.2)	13.2 (55.8)	19.0 (66.2)	22.7 (72.9)	24.3 (75.7)	22.9 (73.2)	17.7 (63.9)	11.1 (52.0)	3.3 (37.9)	−3.1 (26.4)	10.8 (51.5)
Mean daily minimum °C (°F)	−9.4 (15.1)	−6.3 (20.7)	−0.1 (31.8)	7.1 (44.8)	12.3 (54.1)	16.8 (62.2)	19.7 (67.5)	18.4 (65.1)	12.8 (55.0)	6.1 (43.0)	−1.1 (30.0)	−7.3 (18.9)	5.8 (42.3)
Record low °C (°F)	−19.2 (−2.6)	−15.9 (3.4)	−11.5 (11.3)	−2.9 (26.8)	4.2 (39.6)	8.3 (46.9)	12.6 (54.7)	11.3 (52.3)	3.4 (38.1)	−4.5 (23.9)	−13.3 (8.1)	−14.9 (5.2)	−19.2 (−2.6)
Average precipitation mm (inches)	1.7 (0.07)	4.7 (0.19)	8.7 (0.34)	22.9 (0.90)	39.2 (1.54)	85.3 (3.36)	212.3 (8.36)	135.5 (5.33)	63.9 (2.52)	29.5 (1.16)	11.4 (0.45)	1.8 (0.07)	616.9 (24.29)
Average precipitation days (≥ 0.1 mm)	1.5	2.3	2.9	5.2	7.2	11.5	13.9	12.9	8.7	5.4	3.1	1.4	76
Average snowy days	2.1	2.3	2.1	0.4	0	0	0	0	0	0	1.8	1.8	10.5
Average relative humidity (%)	45	42	41	44	51	63	76	79	75	65	54	47	57
Mean monthly sunshine hours	157.2	155.3	188.1	211.6	233.8	198.3	171.3	179.1	170.8	166.2	146.5	151.7	2,129.9
Percentage possible sunshine	52	51	51	53	53	44	38	43	46	49	49	52	48
Source: China Meteorological AdministrationAll-time June low

== See also ==
- List of township-level divisions of Beijing
