= Dashiwo =

Dashiwo Town 大石窝镇
- Town
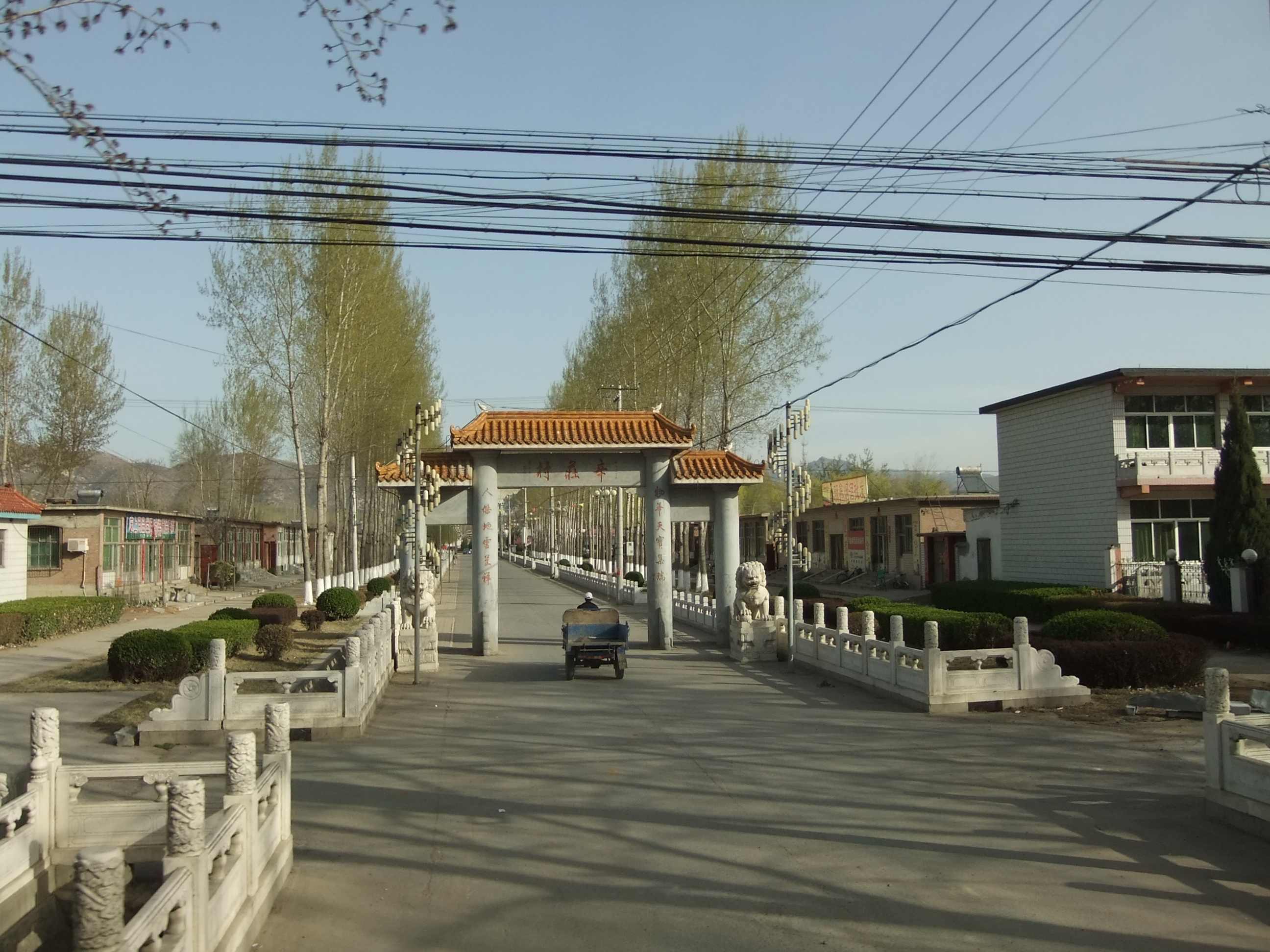
- Xinzhuang Village on the western portion of the town, 2011

- Location within Beijing Location within China
- Coordinates: 39°33′06″N 115°49′14″E
- Country: China
- Municipality: Beijing
- District: Fangshan
- Village-level Divisions: 24 villages

Area
  - Total: 90.81 km^{2} (35.06 sq mi)

Population (2020)
  - Total: 31,000
  - Density: 340/km^{2} (880/sq mi)
- Time zone: UTC+8 (China Standard)
- Postal code: 102408
- Area code: 010

Dashiwo Town (Chinese: 大石窝镇; pinyin: Dàshíwō Zhèn) is a town situated on the south side of Fangshan District, Beijing, China. It shares a border with Hanghecun and Changgou Towns in its east, Dongxianpo Village in its south, and Zhangfang Town in its northwest. As of 2020, the town had a census population of 31,000.

== History ==
Timeline of Dashiwo Town's History
Year	Status	Part of
1949 - 1953	3rd District (三区)	Fangshan County (房山县)
1953 - 1954	New 5th District (新五区)	Fangshan County (房山县)
1954 - 1956	Split among 5 townships: Xiatan (下滩); Shiwo (石窝); Nan Shangle (南尚乐); Bei Shangle (北尚乐); Shimen (石门)	Fangshan County (房山县)
1956 - 1958	Split among 5 townships: Nan Shangle, Xiatan and Shiwo	Fangshan County (房山县)
1958 - 1961	Nan Shangle Management District (南尚乐管理区), under Changgou People's Commune (长沟人民公社)	Zhoukoudian District (周口店区)
1961 - 1983	Nan Shangle People's Commune (南尚乐人民公社)	Fangshan County
1983 - 1986	Nan Shangle Township (南尚乐乡)	Fangshan County
1986 - 1995	Nan Shangle Township (南尚乐乡)	Fangshan District (房山区)
1995 - 2001	Nan Shangle Town (南尚乐镇)	Fangshan District (房山区)
2001–present	Dashiwo Town (大石窝镇)	Fangshan District (房山区)

== Administrative Divisions ==
In 2021, Dashiwo Town had 24 villages under its administration:

Administrative division code	Subdivision names	Name transliteration
110111109200	王家磨	Wangjiamo
110111109201	蔡庄	Caizhuang
110111109202	下滩	Xiatan
110111109203	郑家磨	Zhengjiamo
110111109204	土堤	Tudi
110111109205	镇江营	Zhenjiangying
110111109206	塔照	Tazhao
110111109207	南尚乐	Nan Shangle
110111109208	北尚乐	Bei Shangle
110111109209	南河	Nanhe
110111109210	惠南庄	Huinanzhuang
110111109211	广润庄	Guangrunzhuang
110111109212	辛庄	Xinzhuang
110111109213	石窝	Shiwo
110111109214	半壁店	Banbidian
110111109215	独树	Dushu
110111109216	岩上	Yanshang
110111109217	下营	Xiaying
110111109218	高庄	Gaozhuang
110111109219	前石门	Qianshimen
110111109220	后石门	Houshimen
110111109221	下庄	Xiazhuang
110111109222	三岔	Sancha
110111109223	水头	Shuitou

== Landmark ==
- Yunju Temple

== Gallery ==
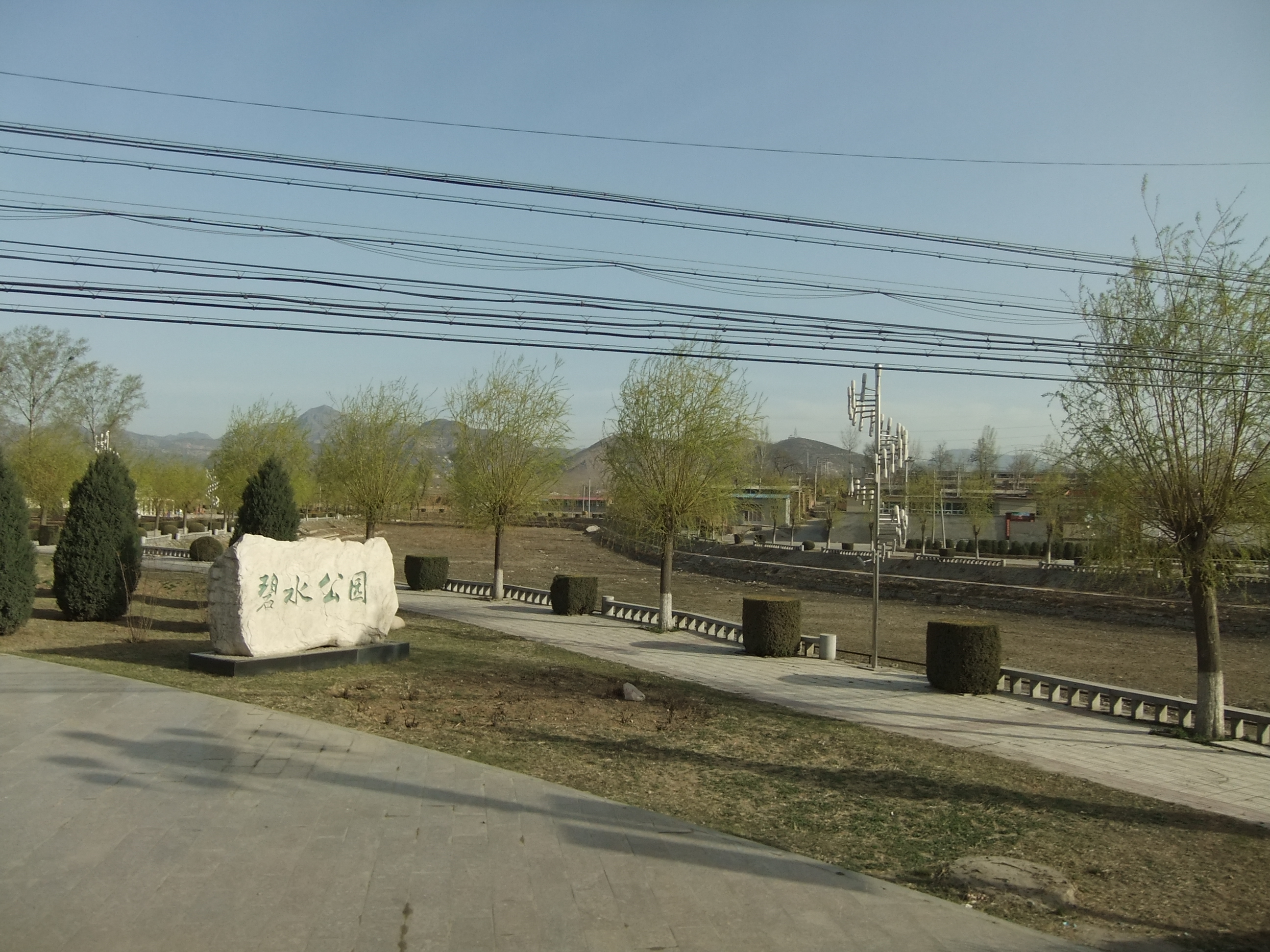
Green Water Park (碧水公园) on the east of the town, 2011

== See also ==
- List of township-level divisions of Beijing
