= Xilu Subdistrict =

Xilu Subdistrict 西潞街道
- Subdistrict
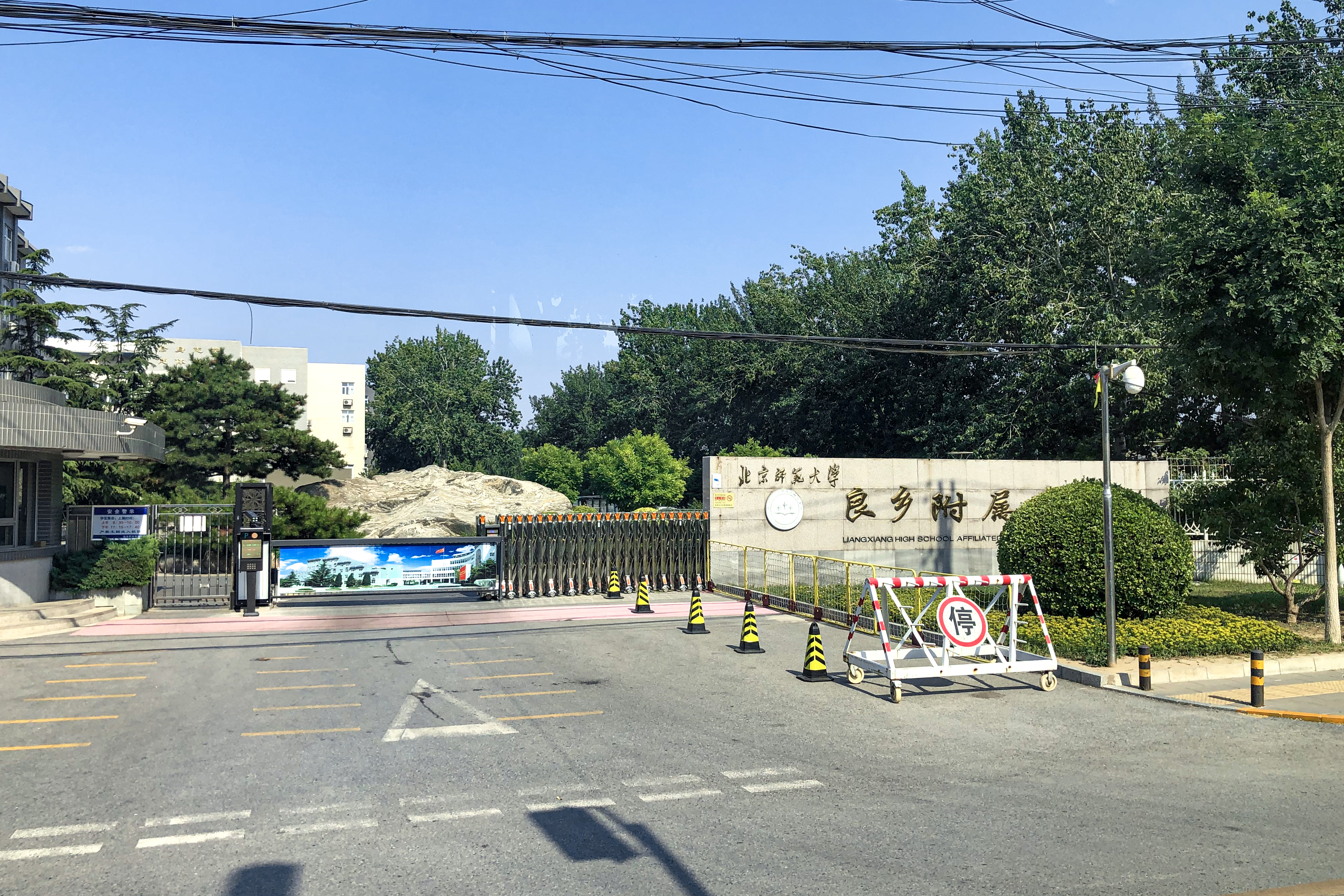
- Liangxiang High School Affiliated to Beijing Normal University, 2021

- Location within Beijing Location within China
- Coordinates: 39°43′27″N 116°06′33″E
- Country: China
- Municipality: Beijing
- District: Fangshan
- Village-level Divisions: 17 communities 7 villages

Area
  - Total: 10.81 km^{2} (4.17 sq mi)

Population (2020)
  - Total: 75,903
  - Density: 7,022/km^{2} (18,190/sq mi)
- Time zone: UTC+8 (China Standard)
- Postal code: 102412
- Area code: 010

Xilu Subdistrict (Chinese: 西潞街道; pinyin: Xīlù Jiēdào) is one of the eight subdistricts of Fangshan District, Beijing, China. It borders Wangzuo Town in the north, Gongchen Subdistrict in the east, Yanchun Town in the southwest, and Qinglonghu Town in the northwest. It had 75,903 residents as of 2020.

== History ==
Timetable of Xilu Subdistrict‘s History
Year	Status
1916	Part of the 1st Central District of Liangxiang County
1949	Part of Chengxiang District
1951	Part of the 1st District
1953	Part of Liangxiang Town
1956	Part of Chengguan Town
1958	Part of Liangxiang People's Commune
1960	Incorporated into Liangxiang People's Commune
1979	reinstated as Liangxiang Town
1989	Became Liangxiang Area
1999	Became a town while retaining the status of an area
2001	Incorporated Guandao Town
2005	Liangxiang Town was split into 3, the northwestern portion became Xilu Subdistrict

== Administrative Divisions ==
In 2021, Xilu Subdistrict administered 24 subdisvisions, including 17 communities and 7 villages:

Administrative division code	Subdivision names	Name transliteration	Type
10111012001	夏庄	Xiazhuang	Community
110111012002	西潞东里	Xilu Dongli	Community
110111012003	月华东里	Yuehua Dongli	Community
110111012004	北潞园	Beiluyuan	Community
110111012005	苏庄一里	Suzhuang Yili	Community
110111012006	西潞园	Xiluyuan	Community
110111012007	苏庄二里	Suzhuang Erli	Community
110111012008	西路大街	Xilu Dajie	Community
110111012009	苏庄三里	Suzhuang Sanli	Community
110111012010	海逸半岛	Haiyi Bandao	Community
110111012011	太平庄西里	Taipingzhuang Xili	Community
110111012012	北潞春	Beiluchun	Community
110111012013	金鸽园	Jingeyuan	Community
110111012014	太平庄东里	Taipingzhuang Dongli	Community
110111012015	海悦嘉园	Haiyue Jiayuan	Community
110111012016	北潞馨	Beiluxin	Community
110111012017	西潞园南里	Xiluyuan Nanli	Community
110111012200	詹庄	Zhanzhuang	Village
110111012201	安庄	Anzhuang	Village
110111012202	固村	Gucun	Village
110111012203	太平庄	Taipingzhuang	Village
110111012204	南上岗	Nanshanggang	Village
110111012205	东沿村	Dongyancun	Village
110111012206	苏庄	Suzhuang	Village

== See also ==
- List of township-level divisions of Beijing
