= Wanfo Hall, Kongshuidong Stone Carvings and Pagoda =

Buddhist site in Beijing, China

Wanfotang, Kongshui Cave Stone Carvings and Pagodas are a group of Buddhist cultural relics located in Wanfotang Village, Hebei Town, Fangshan District, Beijing, People's Republic of China. The site consists of Wanfotang, built during the Tang dynasty; the Kongshui Cave stone carvings, excavated from the Sui and Tang dynasties to the Jin dynasty; a Liao dynasty flower pagoda; and a Yuan dynasty dense-eaved pagoda. Kongshui Cave is a natural karst cave in the local area. During the Tang dynasty, Zhu Xicai, military governor of the Pinglu Circuit, funded the construction of a temple above the entrance to Kongshui Cave, which became the original temple to which Wanfotang belonged. The temple was later repeatedly destroyed by war and rebuilt several times. During this period, two Buddhist pagodas were successively built around Wanfotang. During the Zhengde reign of the Ming dynasty, the Tang-dynasty white marble reliefs on the cliff behind Wanfotang were moved into Wanfotang. In 1979, Wanfotang and Kongshui Cave were listed as Beijing municipal cultural relics protection units. In 2001, “Wanfotang, Kongshui Cave Stone Carvings and Pagodas” was listed as a Major Historical and Cultural Site Protected at the National Level.

== History ==
The earliest record of Kongshui Cave appears in the Commentary on the Water Classic. Related records are also corroborated by the Suizhoujun Tujing of the Sui dynasty, and Buddhist niches excavated during the Sui dynasty have also been found inside Kongshui Cave.

During the reign of Emperor Xuanzong of Tang, from 713 to 755, Zhu Xicai, military governor of the Pinglu Circuit, funded the construction of a temple around Kongshui Cave. The specific construction work was overseen by a Buddhist nun known as Xilaoren. The temple was originally named Longquan Temple. Later, during the Dali era of Emperor Daizong of Tang, it was renamed Longquan Dali Chan Temple. The temple name was bestowed by Emperor Daizong after Zhu Xicai submitted a request to the throneA Buddhist hall was built on the platform above the exit of Kongshui Cave, and this hall became Wanfotang.

At the end of the Liao dynasty, the temple was destroyed in warfare. In the early Jin dynasty, Chan Master Haihui restored the temple. However, at the end of the Jin dynasty, it was destroyed by the Mongol army, and reconstruction was completed between the second and seventh years of Ögedei Khan’s reign. During the Dade era of the Yuan dynasty, Longquan Chan Temple was again repaired.

In the early Ming dynasty, Longquan Chan Temple was once more destroyed by war. During the Yongle reign, the mountainous area surrounding Longquan Chan Temple was granted as a fief to Zhang Fu, Duke of Huguo. Zhang Fu’s younger brother Zhang Suo arranged for his granddaughter Wuxing to serve as abbess of Longquan Chan Temple, after which Wuxing restored the temple During the Zhengde reign of the Ming dynasty, Longquan Chan Temple was also repaired and a commemorative stele was left behind. During this restoration, the monks removed the heavily damaged relief known as the Manjushri and Samantabhadra Assembly of Ten Thousand Bodhisattvas, which had originally been embedded in the cliff, and placed it inside Wanfotang.

The last repair record found in historical materials was completed in the seventeenth year of the Wanli reign of the Ming dynasty, namely 1589.After the Qing dynasty, most of the buildings in the temple were converted into a Guandi Temple, but were later abandoned.

In 1960, the Fangshan Coal Mine of the Beijing Mining Bureau moved its mining office next to Wanfotang. From then on, Wanfotang was incorporated into the office and factory area of the Fangshan Coal Mine.In 1982, because the spring water in Kongshui Cave had become silted up, workers from the Fangshan Coal Mine entered the cave to clear the silt. During the clearing work, they discovered seven Tang dynasty bronze “golden dragons” of varying lengths, the shortest measuring centimeters and the longest centimeters.

== Structure ==
Wanfotang, Kongshui Cave Stone Carvings and Pagodas are located in Wanfotang Village, Hebei Town, Fangshan District, Beijing. The site is divided into four parts: Wanfotang, Kongshui Cave, the Liao dynasty flower pagoda, and the Yuan dynasty multi-eaved pagoda.

=== Wanfotang ===
Wanfotang was built on a brick and stone platform in front of Kongshui Cave, constructed against the mountain slope. It is three bays wide and has a beamless xieshan-style roof covered with grey tubular tiles, with large ridge ornaments and beast-shaped decorations. A doorway is opened in the center of the front facade, while the two side bays each have one window. The doors and windows are framed with white marble arches, carved with reliefs of birds and flowers. Above the lintel is an embedded stone plaque inscribed in regular script with the words “Dali Ancient Site, Wanfotang Longquan Precious Hall.” Beside it is the inscription “Rebuilt on an auspicious spring day in the jichou year of the Wanli reign of the Great Ming.” The plaque is surrounded by lotus reliefs. Both windows are semicircular stone-arched windows, and their shutters are carved from stone with openwork net patterns.On the other three walls inside Wanfotang is an embedded stone relief titled Manjushri and Samantabhadra Assembly of Ten Thousand Bodhisattvas. The relief is 23.8 meters long and 2.47 meters high, and is composed of 31 rectangular white marble relief panels. At the center of the relief is a statue of Shakyamuni raising his hand to preach. He has snail-shell curls, a bare chest, and a wide robe with large sleeves. His right hand is raised flat with the palm extended, while his left hand rests on his leg. His legs hang downward, his feet are bare, and two yakshas and a mani jewel are placed below his feet.On both sides are protective images of Manjushri and Samantabhadra. Both figures wear jeweled crowns and are draped with necklaces and flowing ribbons. They are surrounded by donor bodhisattvas, heavenly kings, divine beings, and other figures. Above the image of Shakyamuni is a carved image of a god of the cakravartin, with wings on the back, a nude body, necklaces, the sun and moon held in the hands, and two dragon women under the feet.[a] Outside the main relief, there are also carvings of flying apsaras scattering flowers, musicians performing, and other scenes.In addition, images of a thousand Buddhas are carved on the left, right, and upper sides. On the southern gable wall is an inscription of a vow text, although the writing is incomplete. Among the surviving characters is an incised inscription dated “the eighth day of the third month of the fifth year of Dali.” Some adjacent stone carvings do not connect with one another in terms of their patterns. Above the stone reliefs, 19 surviving ink inscriptions can still be seen. The text indicates that they were used to mark positions, each marked on different white marble blocks. From this, it can be roughly inferred that these stone carvings were not originally connected, but were separately arranged on three gable walls. Their original arrangement, however, can no longer be determined

=== Kongshui Cave ===
Kongshui Cave is located directly below Wanfotang and is a natural karst cave. Stone bricks were laid at the entrance of the cave. These bricks are carved with aquatic beasts, and there is a swimming dragon on each side. Spring water flows out from directly below the entrance. Traces of an original stone gate remain around the stone bricks, but only two stone beams at the top survive today.

After entering the cave, stone images and carved Buddhist scriptures from the Sui, Tang, and Jin dynasties can be seen on the stone walls. The images are located above the carved scriptures and consist of two niches, one on the left and one on the right. The left niche is an arched niche containing one Buddha and two bodhisattvas. On both sides of the niche are two images of Maheshvara riding bulls. The niche is 1.05 meters high and 0.65 meters wide at the base. On both sides of the niche are octagonal shuzhu columns, an ancient architectural term. The middle sections of the columns are decorated with reliefs of upturned and downturned lotus petals. The Buddha is seated, with an elongated oval face, a high ushnisha, and legs crossed in the lotus posture. Beside the Buddha are two standing figures, each standing on a lotus base and wearing wide robes with large sleeves.

Inside the right niche is a bodhisattva seated in the heroic cross-legged posture. The figure wears a floral crown, with an arched circular halo behind the head carved with flame patterns. The left arm hangs down, while the right hand rests on the left knee. The right elbow bends upward, and the fingers are damaged. The left lower leg is folded up, while the right leg hangs naturally downward.

Below the two niches, the rock wall is recessed and carved with Buddhist scriptures. The cliff-carved scriptures dated to the tenth year of the Daye reign of the Sui dynasty, namely 614, cover a cliff surface approximately 300 to 400 centimeters wide, although the height is unknown. The texts are the “Chapter on Longevity” from the Mahaparinirvana Sutra and the “Universal Gate Chapter of Avalokitesvara” from the Lotus Sutra. There are 49 lines of regular script, with about 20 characters distinguishable in each line. When the scriptures were discovered in 1979, the lower third of the text was submerged in the spring water of Kongshui Cave.

To the right of the Sui dynasty inscription is an inscription carved in the twentieth year of the Dading reign of the Jin dynasty, namely 1180. It is written in regular script, though some parts are missing. The legible characters include “Beiling beichuikou Dafang ancient monastery, Golden Buddha Hall ... Dading gengzi twentieth year” and “Minister of Personnel, imperial son-in-law commandant Wulin ... inscription by son-in-law Caohe ... Xiwanyan ... Geda, attendant inscription.” Due to years of water erosion, the carvings have become somewhat blurred.

=== Flower Pagoda ===
A Liao dynasty flower pagoda stands halfway up the mountain northwest of Wanfotang. It is the only flower pagoda in Beijing apart from Zhengang Pagoda. The pagoda faces south and is 20 meters high, with an octagonal plan. The lower part of the pagoda body is a plain base, supporting a Sumeru pedestal. The lower molding of the Sumeru pedestal is octagonal. At the center of each of the eight sides is a carved lotus-leaf pier, with one pot-shaped niche on each side, decorated inside with lion heads.

Above the Sumeru pedestal is a waisted section. Columns are carved in relief at the eight corners and in the center of each side of the waisted section. The central columns are vase-shaped, while the corner columns take the form of guardian figures, either armored or nude. Between every two columns are two pot-shaped niches, each containing musician deities in different poses. On both sides of the niches are reliefs of musician deities, guardian figures, flowers, kundika bottles, and other objects.

Above the columns is a flat platform imitating dougong bracket construction. On each side of the platform’s bracket sets is one intermediate bracket set. The corner bracket sets are the same as the intermediate bracket sets, except that diagonal brackets project from the front and side. Between the corner bracket sets and the intermediate bracket sets are central brackets. The railing panels are carved in relief with hook-shaped ornaments, swastika patterns, and other motifs.

Above the flat platform is an upturned lotus base, which supports the pagoda body. The first story of the pagoda body is relatively tall. Its eight corners are chamfered square columns. Below the columns are inverted-basin-style column bases, and above the columns are eaves. Beneath the eaves are architraves and pupaifang beams. Under the eaves, each side has one intermediate bracket set, consisting of five-purlin double-arch bracket sets with central supports.

Of the four main faces of the pagoda, three have arched false doors, while the north-facing main door can be entered and exited. The four diagonal faces each have square false windows. The main door faces south. In the middle of its lintel are two carved musician deities, with scrolling flowers and musician heavenly beings on both sides. Above them is a bodhisattva with a high crown and lotus seat, holding the palms together. Additional bodhisattva images are carved above, below, and on both sides.

The southeast false window is carved with an image of Manjushri riding a lion. The lintel of the eastern false door is carved with two dragons playing with a pearl, while the center of the lintel has reliefs of two immortals. The door is decorated with two square lotus-petal door studs, four rows of door nails with three nails in each row, and a beast head holding a ring. Below the door is a square door pillow stone. Traces of red paint remain on the door. On each side of the door is a standing armored guardian figure. Above the door are five divine figures, two necklace-wearing bodhisattvas, and one arhat.

The decorations around the northeast false window are the same as those on the northwest side. The false door on the north side is generally decorated in the same way as the west-facing false door, but the door is shaped as if a woman is partially closing it. The surrounding reliefs include a Buddha, Ananda, Kasyapa, two bodhisattvas, and two seated Buddhas.

Above the northwest false window is a relief of a seated Buddha holding the palms together. On both the left and right shoulders are reliefs of lions in biting poses. On both sides of the seated Buddha are attendant figures. At the lower right of the false window is a relief of a boat, with people on board shown rowing with oars. On both sides of the lintel of the western false door are armored guardian figures. Above the door is a relief of one Buddha and two bodhisattvas, with four small Buddhas carved above. Above the southwest false window is an image of Samantabhadra.

The four walls and caisson ceiling inside the pagoda chamber originally had murals, but they have peeled away over time and their original content can no longer be seen. There is also a large amount of modern carved graffiti inside. In addition, inscriptions are carved or written in many places on the first story of the pagoda body, including “sixth year of Xianyong,” “a year of Dading,” and “again on the twenty-ninth day of the fifth month in the seventh year of Shouchang”

Above the first story is the second story of the pagoda body. Each of the eight corners has a column, with no decoration between the columns. At the top are pupaifang beams, above which are bracket sets. Each side has one intermediate bracket set, consisting of single-cantilever four-purlin bracket sets. The corner bracket sets are the same as the intermediate bracket sets except that 45-degree diagonal brackets project from the front and side.

Above the second-story eaves are seven gradually tapering circular platforms. The first of these seven platforms is a two-story heavenly palace pavilion. This story imitates timber construction. The gable walls of the pavilions have inward inclinations, and false doors and false windows are opened between the two stories. The remaining six platforms each have square Buddhist niches, each containing one seated Buddha. Between the niches are reliefs of lion heads and elephant heads. At the top is an octagonal pavilion-style pagoda finial. The jewel portion has been damaged. Due to long-term disrepair, its original form can no longer be determined.

=== Multi-eaved Pagoda ===
To the southeast of Wanfotang is the Yuan dynasty stupa of Monk Linggong. It is 18 meters high and is an octagonal seven-story multi-eaved brick pagoda. Its overall form is the same as the Jin dynasty pagodas in the Yinshan Pagoda Forest, but no historical records have been found concerning the life of Monk Linggong.

Above the terrace was an inverted lotus pedestal, upon which the body of the pagoda was erected. The first storey of the pagoda was relatively tall. The eight corners were formed by chamfered square pillars resting on inverted-basin-shaped column bases. Eaves projected from the tops of the pillars, beneath which were architraves and purlin beams. Under the eaves, one set of bracket arms (dougong) was placed between the pillars on each side, employing a five-rank bracket system with double brackets in the jixinzao style.

Of the four principal sides of the first storey, three were decorated with arched false doors, while the northern side contained the only functional entrance. The remaining four diagonal sides each featured a square false window. The entrance faced south. At the centre of its lintel were two celestial musicians, flanked by scrolling floral motifs and heavenly musicians. Above them was a bodhisattva seated on a lotus throne with hands joined in prayer and wearing a high crown, while additional bodhisattva figures were carved above, below, and on either side.

The false window on the southeast side was decorated with a relief of Mañjuśrī riding a lion. The lintel of the false door on the east side featured two dragons playing with a pearl, while the centre of the lintel contained reliefs of two immortals. The doorway was further adorned with two square lotus-petal door ornaments, four rows of door studs with three studs in each row, and beast-head ring handles. Beneath the doorway was a rectangular threshold stone, and traces of red paint remained on the door surface. An armoured guardian figure stood on each side of the doorway. Above the doorway were carvings of five divine beings, two bodhisattvas adorned with jeweled ornaments, and one arhat.

The decorative scheme surrounding the false window on the northeast side was similar to that of the northwest side. The false door on the north side was generally similar to that on the west side, except that it depicted a woman partially closing the door. The surrounding reliefs included the Buddha, Ānanda, Mahākāśyapa, two bodhisattvas, and two seated Buddhas.

Above the false window on the northwest side was a seated Buddha with hands joined in prayer. Relief lions appeared beside both shoulders in attacking poses. Attendant figures were carved on either side of the Buddha. Below the right side of the false window was a relief of a boat with a figure rowing. The false door on the west side was flanked by armoured guardians. Above the doorway was a relief composition consisting of one Buddha and two bodhisattvas, surmounted by four smaller Buddha figures. Above the false window on the southwest side was a relief of Samantabhadra Bodhisattva.

The interior walls and caisson ceiling of the pagoda chamber were once covered with murals, but these have largely flaked away over time and their original content can no longer be discerned. Numerous modern graffiti inscriptions are also present inside the chamber. In addition, various inscriptions survive on the exterior of the first story, including references such as “the sixth year of Xianyong”, “a year of the Dading era”, and “the twenty-ninth day of the fifth month in the seventh year of Shouchang”.

Above the eaves of the second storey rose seven progressively diminishing circular terraces. The first of these terraces took the form of a two-storey Heavenly Palace pavilion (Tiangong Louge), constructed in imitation of timber architecture. The pavilion's gable walls featured inclined profiles, and false doors and windows were set between the two storeys. The remaining six terraces each contained square Buddha niches, with a seated Buddha figure in every niche. Relief lion heads and elephant heads were carved between adjacent niches.

The crowning finial consisted of an octagonal pavilion-shaped structure. The jewel at the summit has been lost, and due to prolonged deterioration, its original form can no longer be determined.

=== Relic Pagoda ===
To the southeast of Wanfo Hall stands the Relic Pagoda of Monk Linggong, a brick pagoda dating to the Yuan dynasty. The pagoda is 18 metres tall and is an octagonal seven-storey dense-eaved pagoda. Its overall architectural form is similar to that of the Jin-dynasty pagodas in the Yinshan Pagoda Forest. However, no historical records concerning the life of Monk Linggong have been found.

== Conservation ==
In 1979, Wanfotang and Kongshui Cave were listed as Beijing municipal cultural relics protection units.In 1994, the Beijing Municipal Cultural Relics Bureau allocated funds for special maintenance of Wanfotang.On June 25, 2001, Wanfotang, Kongshui Cave Stone Carvings and Pagodas were listed as a Major Historical and Cultural Site Protected at the National Level.In April 2004, an emergency repair project for Wanfotang, Kongshui Cave Stone Carvings and Pagodas officially began, and it was completed in December of the same year.

In May 2017, cultural heritage protection volunteers found a looting hole about one meter deep inside the central chamber of the Wanfotang flower pagoda. Bricks removed during the digging of the hole were scattered on the ground. According to the investigation, the theft had occurred within the previous six months, but whether any objects had been stolen remained unknown.

== Notes ==
The stone material of this relief differs greatly from that of the other parts, and it is suspected to have been carved later
