= Puwa Township =

Puwa Township 蒲洼乡
- Township
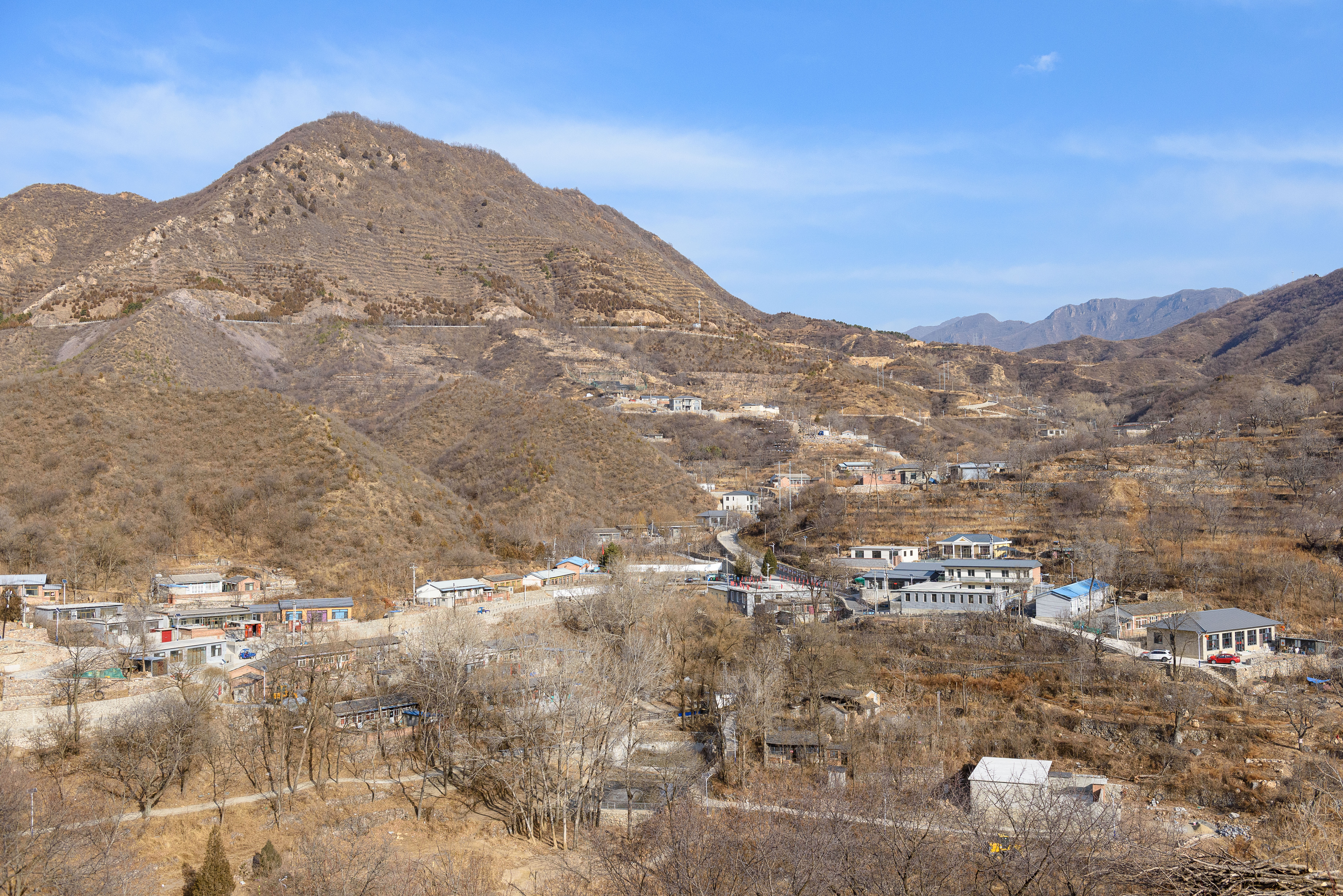
- Yudouquan, the westernmost village of Beijing municipality

- Location within Beijing Location within China
- Coordinates: 39°43′58″N 115°31′46″E
- Country: China
- Municipality: Beijing
- District: Fangshan
- Village-level Divisions: 8 villages

Area
  - Total: 90.47 km^{2} (34.93 sq mi)
- Elevation: 407 m (1,335 ft)

Population (2020)
  - Total: 2,074
  - Density: 22.92/km^{2} (59.37/sq mi)
- Time zone: UTC+8 (China Standard)
- Postal code: 102477
- Area code: 010

Puwa Township (Chinese: 蒲洼乡; pinyin: Púwā Xiāng) is a township situated within Fangshan District, Beijing, China. It borders Nanbianqiao Village to the north, Xiayunling Township to the east, Shidu Town to the south, and Magezhuang Village to the west. As of 2020, it had a total population of 2,074.

== History ==
History of Puwa Township
Time	Status	Belonged to
1916–1949	8th District	Fangshan County
1949–1954	2nd District	Fangshan County
1954–1958	Split among 5 townships: Puwa, Yihe, Dongcun, Baoshui and Luzishui	Fangshan County
1958–1961	Puwa Management District, under Ma'an People's Commune	Zhoukoudian District
1961–1983	Puwa People's Commune	Fangshan County
1983–1986	Puwa Township	Fangshan County
1986–present	Puwa Township	Fangshan District

== Administrative Divisions ==
As of 2021, Puwa township had 8 villages within its borders. They are listed as follows:

Administrative division code	Subdivision names	Name transliterations
110111213200	鱼斗泉	Yudouquan
110111213201	芦子水	Luzishui
110111213202	东村	Dongcun
110111213203	宝水	Baoshui
110111213204	蒲洼	Puwa
110111213205	富合	Fuhe
110111213206	森水	Senshui
110111213207	议合	Yihe

== See also ==
- List of township-level divisions of Beijing
