= Yan (surname 阎) =

- Language: Chinese

Origin
- Derivation: Yan (fiefdom in Jin)

Other names
- Derivative: Yan (閆)

In 2008, the surname Yan (simplified Chinese: 阎; traditional Chinese: 閻; pinyin: Yán) was estimated to be the 75th most common surname in the People's Republic of China, shared by around 3.1 million citizens, making it the most common of the surnames romanized Yan without tone markers.

The surname 闫 (traditional Chinese: 閆; pinyin: Yán) was created as a result of the second round of simplified Chinese characters, in 1977. Although this series of simplifications was soon retracted, some people retained the simplified surname. One source suggests that the original (阎) is more common, as it is shared by 4,900,000 people, and the 78th-most common name, while 闫 is only shared by 3,200,000 people, or the 103rd most common name. Both appear on the Hundred Family Surnames poem.

It may be derived from one of the following sources:

- from a fief located around Xihua County, Henan, granted to Zhong Yi, a great-grandson of Taibo, by King Wu of Zhou. Another source claims the fief was granted by King Kang of Zhou to his eldest son
- from a fief (located around the town of Yanjing in Shanxi) granted to Yi, the prince of Jin during the Spring and Autumn period.

== Notable people ==
- Yan Chongnian (Chinese: 阎崇年; born 1934) — Chinese historian
- Yan Fang (Chinese: 阎芳) — Chinese softball player
- Yan Feng (Chinese: 阎峰) — Chinese paralympic athlete competing in throwing events
- Yan Hong (Chinese: 阎红) — Chinese race walker
- Yan Lianke (Chinese: 阎连科; born 1958) — Chinese writer of novels and short stories
- Yan Su (Chinese: 阎肃; 1930-2016) — Chinese lyricist and screenwriter
- Yan Sen (Chinese: 阎森; born 1975) — Chinese table tennis player
- Yan Shipeng (Chinese: 阎世鹏; born 1987) — Chinese football player
- Yan Song (Chinese: 阎嵩; born 1981) — Chinese footballer
- Yan Weiwen (Chinese: 阎维文; born 1957) — Chinese opera singer with origins in the People's Liberation Army
- Yan Xiangchuang (Chinese: 阎相闯) — Chinese professional footballer
- Yan Xishan (Chinese: 閻錫山; 1883–1960) — warlord
- Yan Xuetong (Chinese: 阎学通; born 1952) — Dean of the Institute of Modern International Relations at Tsinghua University
