= Fangshan, Beijing =

Fangshan 房山区
- District
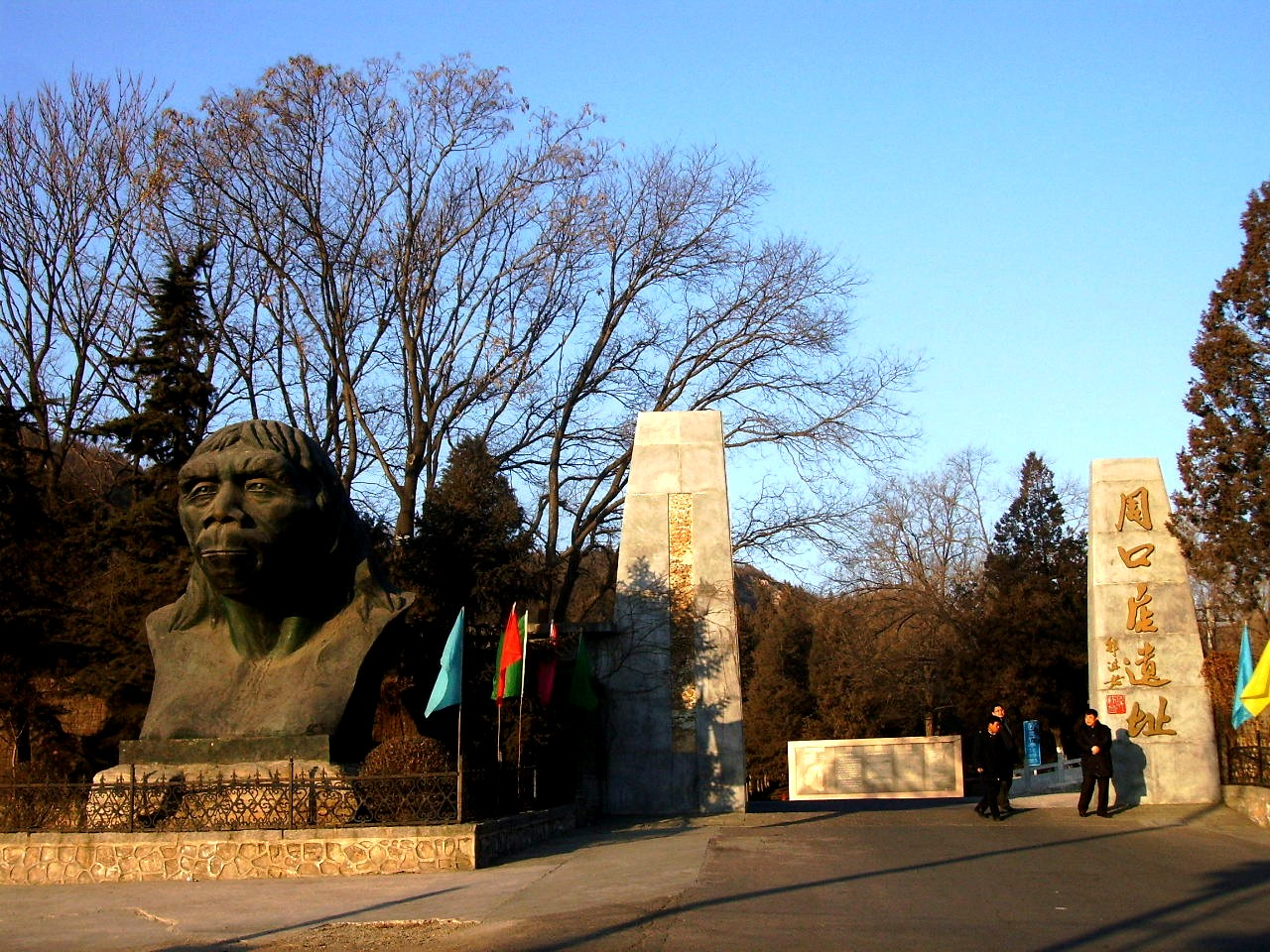
- Entrance to Zhoukoudian Peking Man Site

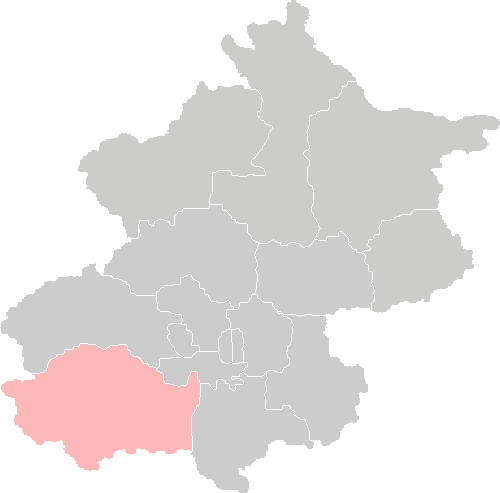
- Location of Fangshan District in Beijing
- Interactive map of Fangshan
- Coordinates (Fangshan government): 39°44′52″N 116°08′13″E
- Country: People's Republic of China
- Municipality: Beijing
- Township-level divisions: 8 subdistricts 14 towns 6 townships

Area
  - Total: 2,019 km^{2} (780 sq mi)

Population (2020 census)
  - Total: 1,312,778
  - Density: 650.2/km^{2} (1,684/sq mi)
- Time zone: UTC+8 (China Standard)
- Area code: 010
- Website: www.bjfsh.gov.cn

Fangshan District (Chinese: 房山区; pinyin: Fángshān Qū) is a district of the city of Beijing. It is situated in the southwest of Beijing, 38 km (24 mi) away from downtown Beijing. It has an area of 2,019 square kilometres (780 sq mi) and a population of 1,312,778 (2020 Census).

The district administers 8 subdistricts, 14 towns, and 6 townships.

== Geography ==
The Subdistrict area of Fangshan (population 187,667) contains an urban area, has an area of 25 km^{2} (9.7 sq mi) and an estimated population of 200,000. Other major urban areas are Liangxiang (population estimate 110,000, 93,486 in township), Zhoukoudian (35,000, 39,877 in township), Doudian (30,000, 25,046 in township), and Liulihe (22,000, 37,936 in township).

Fangshan is situated to the east of the Taihang Mountains, with most of its territory being within Beijing's Western Hills region. The east and south of the district is a fertile plain, with a narrow hilly area running from northeast to southwest. The district has many rivers and lakes; the Juma River, Dashi River, Yongding River, and Xiaoqing River run through the district, assuring abundant water resources.

The location, climate and environment provide good conditions for agriculture. The district produces wheat, rice and various high quality fruits as well as large quantities of animal products. At the moment large investments are made for greenhouse production.

=== Climate ===
Fangshan has a humid continental climate (Köppen climate classification Dwa). The average annual temperature in Fangshan is 12.5 °C (54.5 °F). The average annual rainfall is 542.6 mm (21.36 in) with July as the wettest month. The temperatures are highest on average in July, at around 26.6 °C (79.9 °F), and lowest in January, at around −3.9 °C (25.0 °F).

Climate data for Fangshan District, elevation 49 m (161 ft), (1991–2020 normals, extremes 1981–present)
Month	Jan	Feb	Mar	Apr	May	Jun	Jul	Aug	Sep	Oct	Nov	Dec	Year
Record high °C (°F)	13.6 (56.5)	24.6 (76.3)	29.5 (85.1)	32.9 (91.2)	39.3 (102.7)	39.8 (103.6)	40.3 (104.5)	38.4 (101.1)	37.5 (99.5)	31.0 (87.8)	23.3 (73.9)	15.5 (59.9)	40.3 (104.5)
Mean daily maximum °C (°F)	2.2 (36.0)	6.1 (43.0)	13.2 (55.8)	20.9 (69.6)	26.9 (80.4)	30.6 (87.1)	31.4 (88.5)	30.3 (86.5)	26.2 (79.2)	19.2 (66.6)	10.2 (50.4)	3.6 (38.5)	18.4 (65.1)
Daily mean °C (°F)	−3.9 (25.0)	−0.1 (31.8)	7.0 (44.6)	14.8 (58.6)	20.8 (69.4)	24.8 (76.6)	26.6 (79.9)	25.3 (77.5)	20.1 (68.2)	12.8 (55.0)	4.3 (39.7)	−2.1 (28.2)	12.5 (54.5)
Mean daily minimum °C (°F)	−8.7 (16.3)	−5.3 (22.5)	1.1 (34.0)	8.2 (46.8)	14.1 (57.4)	19.1 (66.4)	22.2 (72.0)	20.9 (69.6)	14.9 (58.8)	7.4 (45.3)	−0.6 (30.9)	−6.5 (20.3)	7.2 (45.0)
Record low °C (°F)	−20.4 (−4.7)	−17.6 (0.3)	−11.4 (11.5)	−3.5 (25.7)	2.1 (35.8)	8.8 (47.8)	14.5 (58.1)	12.7 (54.9)	3.4 (38.1)	−4.4 (24.1)	−12.3 (9.9)	−16.7 (1.9)	−20.4 (−4.7)
Average precipitation mm (inches)	1.8 (0.07)	5.0 (0.20)	8.7 (0.34)	21.5 (0.85)	34.7 (1.37)	71.4 (2.81)	183.9 (7.24)	117.1 (4.61)	55.6 (2.19)	28.3 (1.11)	12.5 (0.49)	2.1 (0.08)	542.6 (21.36)
Average precipitation days (≥ 0.1 mm)	1.4	2.3	3.0	4.5	6.3	10.1	13.2	10.7	7.5	5.2	3.0	1.6	68.8
Average snowy days	2.3	2.2	0.8	0.1	0	0	0	0	0	0	1.5	2.2	9.1
Average relative humidity (%)	50	46	43	47	52	61	74	76	72	66	60	53	58
Mean monthly sunshine hours	167.6	171.8	211.8	231.0	256.5	214.0	180.5	199.7	198.1	189.5	154.7	158.7	2,333.9
Percentage possible sunshine	55	56	57	58	58	48	40	47	54	56	52	55	53
Source: China Meteorological Administration

== Transportation and telecommunication ==
Jingguang railway and Jingyuan railway cross the district. In addition, the district is serviced by 4 branch railways and 24 railway stations. Jingshi Expressway also goes through the district. The four main roads are the Jing-Zhou, Jing-Bao, Jing-Yuan, Jing-Liang roads, with branch roads to townships and villages. The total length of roads is up to 1,800 km (1,100 mi). Tanggu Port in Tianjin is 180 km (110 mi) distant. The programme-controlled telephone capacity supports 128,000 phone sets.

=== Metro ===
Fangshan is currently served by two metro lines operated by Beijing Subway:

- Fangshan line - Daotian, Changyang, Libafang, Guangyangcheng, Liangxiang University Town North, Liangxiang University Town, Liangxiang University Town West, Liangxiangnanguan, Suzhuang, Yancun East
- Yanfang line - Yancun East, Zicaowu, Yancun, Xingcheng, Dashihe East, Magezhuang, Raolefu, Fangshan Chengguan, Yanshan

=== Suburban railway ===
Fangshan is also served by one suburban railway line:

- Sub-Central - Liangxiang

== Administrative Divisions ==
As of 2025, the district contains 8 subdistricts, 14 towns, and 6 townships.

Name	Chinese (S)	Hanyu Pinyin	Population (2010)	Area (km^{2})
Gongchen Subdistrict	拱辰街道	Gǒngchén Jiēdào	132,320	24.70
Chengguan Subdistrict	城关街道	Chéngguān Jiēdào	96,243	51.00
Xinzhen Subdistrict	新镇街道	Xīnzhèn Jiēdào	8,842	1.72
Xilu Subdistrict	西潞街道	Xīlù Jiēdào	64,757	10.40
Xiangyang Subdistrict	向阳街道	Xiàngyáng Jiēdào	8,569	116.00
Dongfeng Subdistrict	东风街道	Dōngfēng Jiēdào	24,321	1.40
Yingfeng Subdistrict	迎风街道	Yíngfēng Jiēdào	31,293	13.00
Xingcheng Subdistrict	星城街道	Xīngchéng Jiēdào	21,861	0.21
Liangxiang town	良乡镇	Liángxiāng Zhèn	18,978	33.90
Zhoukoudian town	周口店镇	Zhōukǒudiàn Zhèn	42,840	126.00
Liulihe town	琉璃河镇	Liúlíhé Zhèn	59,931	104.00
Yancun town	阎村镇	Yáncūn Zhèn	48,773	48.00
Doudian town	窦店镇	Dòudiàn Zhèn	65,574	64.58
Shilou town	石楼镇	Shílóu Zhèn	28,902	42.50
Changyang town	长阳镇	Chángyáng Zhèn	64,996	98.60
Hebei town	河北镇	Héběi Zhèn	19,877	70.00
Changgou town	长沟镇	Chánggōu Zhèn	23,791	38.70
Dashiwo town	大石窝镇	Dàshíwō Zhèn	31,139	96.00
Zhangfang town	张坊镇	Zhāngfāng Zhèn	18,446	152.40
Shidu town	十渡镇	Shídù Zhèn	9,778	301.00
Qinglonghu town	青龙湖镇	Qīnglónghú Zhèn	44,598	95.83
Hancunhe town	韩村河镇	Háncūnhé Zhèn	39,210	100.67
Xiayunling Township	霞云岭乡	Xiáyúnlǐng Xiāng	7,140	218.00
Nanjiao Township	南窖乡	Nánjiào Xiāng	3,739	40.00
Fozizhuang Township	佛子庄乡	Fúzizhuāng Xiāng	8,925	150.06
Da'anshan Township	大安山乡	Dà'ānshān Xiāng	11,217	70.00
Shijiaying Township	史家营乡	Shǐjiāyíng Xiāng	6,300	110.00
Puwa Township	蒲洼乡	Púwā Xiāng	2,472	96.00

== Economy ==
In 2017, the regional GDP of the district is 68.17 billion yuan, with GDP per capita at 59.1 thousand yuan.

=== Mineral resources ===
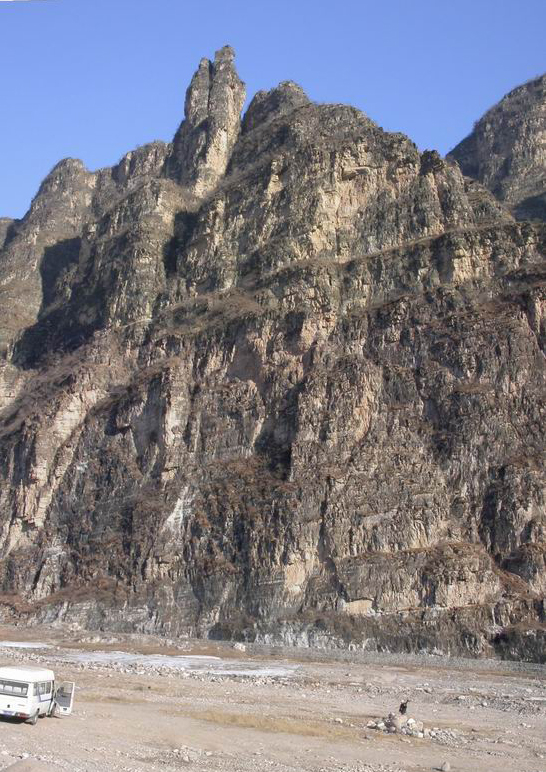
The rugged karst landscape at Shidu.

Fangshan has 2.1 billion tons of coal reserves, which makes it a veritable “coal storehouse” in the west of Beijing; building materials resources are also present in a variety of large deposits. Marble deposits total 450 million cubic meters. A total of 17 kinds have been developed, including "Chinese white marble", "pink", "rosy cloud", and "black jade". In particular, “Chinese white marble” is famous worldwide and is regarded as a national treasure. There are also large deposits of quartzite (29 million tons); silica (28.6 million tons), granite and buhrstone, in addition to argil, mineral water and slab stones.

=== Industry and agriculture ===
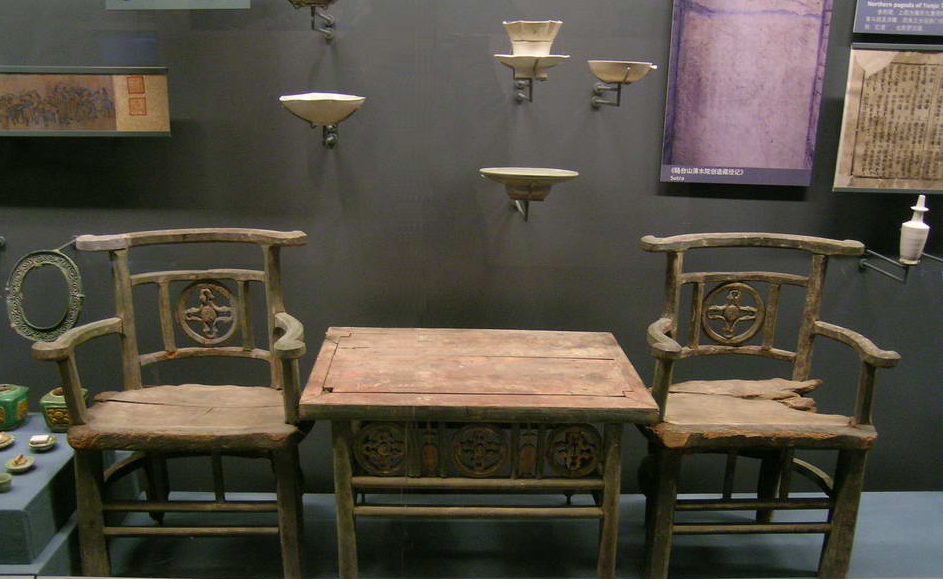
Liao dynasty (907−1125) furniture excavated from an underground palace in Fangshan District of Beijing

Both industry and agriculture are well developed in Fangshan. Over 2300 enterprises owned by the district, townships or villages have been set up and form a complete industrial system in a variety of trades, with different grades and many kinds of products. Yanshan Petrochemical Group, one of the largest state-owned enterprises in China, is located in Fangshan District. Agriculture has developed from traditional growing and planting to integrated and full development in forestry, livestock, greenhouse horticulture and fishery. The building industry has become the backbone of the district, with annual building area reaching 6 million square meters.

The foreign-oriented economy of Fangshan has developed rapidly in recent years. By 1999, the District government had approved 345 foreign-invested enterprises. Over 20 countries and territories throughout five continents are represented. There are 100 export-oriented enterprises producing over 40 kinds of product. Liangxiang Satellite Town, approved by Beijing Municipal Government, has become a new hub of development. In 1998, the site of Fangshan People's Government moved to Liangxiang, making it the district's center of politics, economics and culture. The development Zone of Liangxiang extends favorable policies to business. Under the Ninth Five-Year Plan and Ten-year Outline, the zone will be further opened to the outside and encourage foreign investment in the following industries: electricity, machinery and electronics, instruments, textiles, printing, new building materials, new materials, new energy resources, fine chemicals, food processing, flowers, greenhouse vegetables, tourist facilities, commercial facilities and the animal industry. The zone welcomes overseas Chinese and guests from Hong Kong, Macau, Taiwan and other countries.

== Education ==
Tertiary:

- Yanshan Practice Base of Beijing Institute of Petrochemical Technology

== Military ==
The Beijing Military City, the new military headquarters of the PRC, which will be 10 times larger than The Pentagon in the USA, is currently being built in the Fangshan district.

== Monuments and parks ==
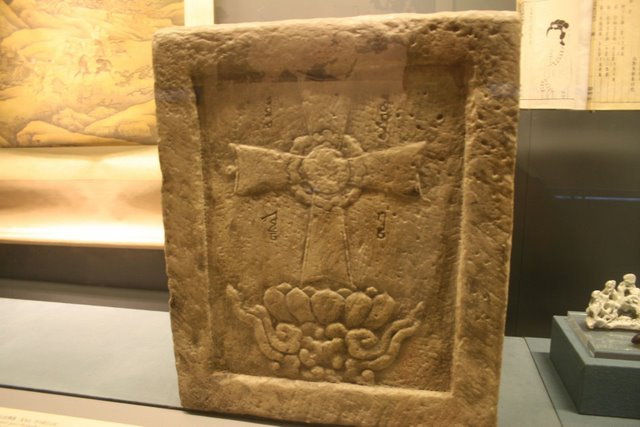
Chinese stone inscription of a Nestorian Christian Cross from a monastery of Fangshan District in Beijing (then called Dadu, or Khanbaliq), dated to the Yuan dynasty (1271–1368 AD) of medieval China.

Fangshan district has a long history and many ancient sites. Best known is Zhoukoudian, location of the “Peking Man Site”, which has gained Fangshan the name of “Home of the Dragon”. The 3,000-year-old ruins of the Liulihe Site are housed in the Western Zhou Yan State Capital Museum. The famous Buddhist shrine of Yunju Temple has precious Buddhist relics, including “Sakyamuni’s Bone” and 14,278 stone slabs with sculpted Buddhist sutras. There are also the remains of the Christian (Jingjiao) Monastery of the Cross from the Yuan dynasty. There are many ancient towers, temples, town sites and other sites in Fangshan. Fangshan also has many scenic spots like Shidu’s karst landscape, the unique Stoneflower Cave and natural ancient forests in Shangfang Mountains. Ecologically, Fangshan has 554 kinds of wild plant and 22 kinds of wild animal.

Fangshan, which is part of Beijing, and neighboring Hebei, together contain Fangshan Geopark. Certified as a National Geopark, and then as a regional geopark (Asia Pacific Geopark Network), it was admitted as a UNESCO Global Geopark in 2006.
