= Xingcheng Subdistrict, Beijing =

Xingcheng Subdistrict 星城街道
- Subdistrict
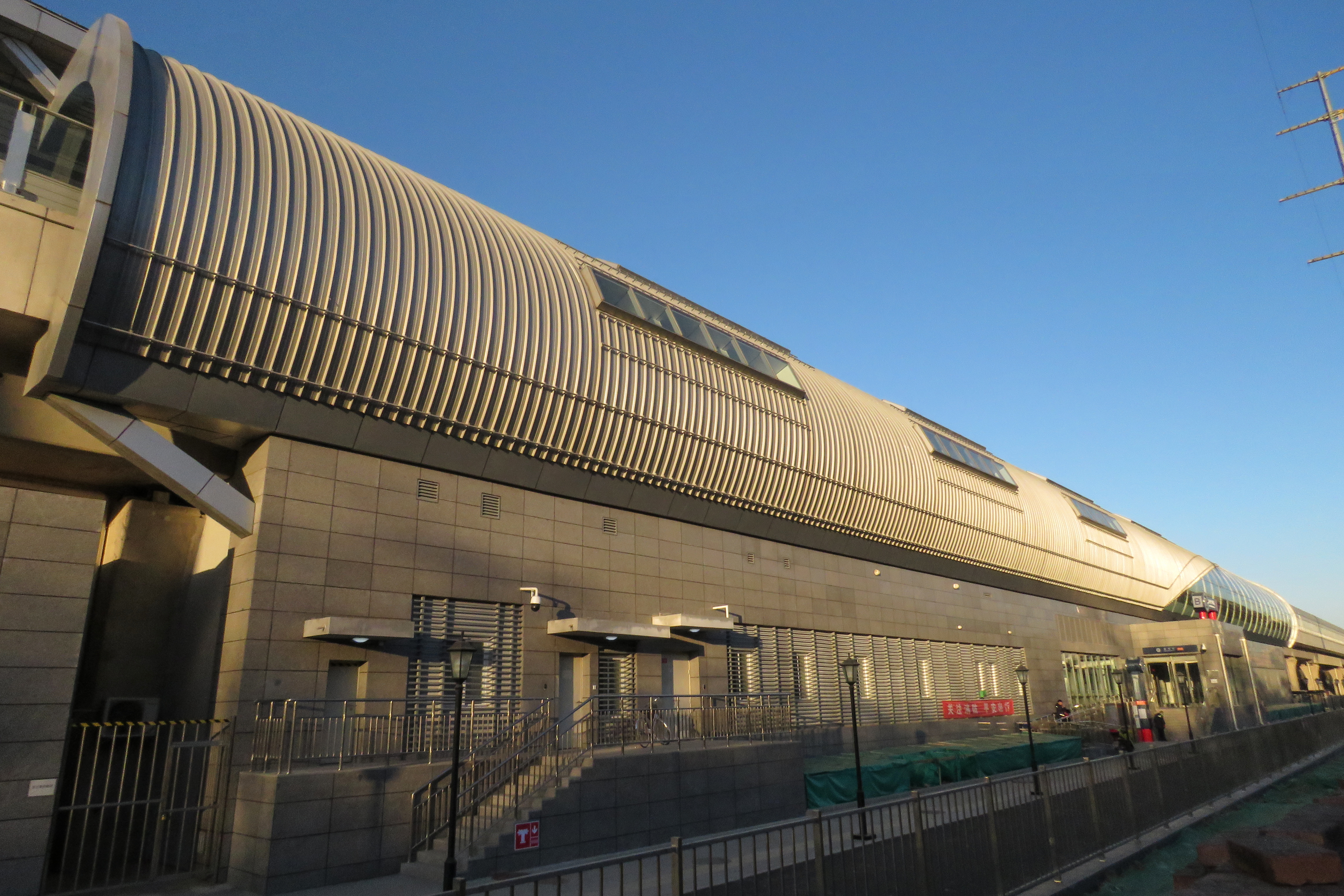
- Xingcheng Station of Yanfang line, 2017

- Location within Beijing Location within China
- Coordinates: 39°42′44″N 116°03′29″E
- Country: China
- Municipality: Beijing
- District: Fangshan
- Village-level Divisions: 7 communities

Area
  - Total: 0.94 km^{2} (0.36 sq mi)

Population (2020)
  - Total: 21,663
  - Density: 23,000/km^{2} (60,000/sq mi)
- Time zone: UTC+8 (China Standard)
- Postal code: 102413
- Area code: 010

Xingcheng Subdistrict (Chinese: 星城街道; pinyin: Xīngchéng Jiēdào) is a subdistrict located on eastern Fangshan District, Beijing, China. It is completedly surrounded by Yancun Town from all four sides. Its population was 21,663 in 2020.

The subdistrict's name Xingcheng is an abbreviation of Shoudu Weixingcheng (Chinese: 首都卫星城; lit. 'Capital Satellite City'), which was the nature of the region when it was formed back in 1996.

== Administrative Divisions ==
In the year 2021, Xingcheng Subdistrict consisted of 7 communities. They are listed as follows:

Administrative division code	Subdivision names	Name transliteration
110111007001	星城第一	Xingcheng Diyi
110111007002	星城第二	Xingcheng Di'er
110111007003	星城第三	Xingcheng Disan
110111007004	星城第四	Xingcheng Disi
110111007005	星城第五	Xingcheng Diwu
110111007006	星城第六	Xingcheng Diliu
110111007007	星城第七	Xingcheng DIqi

== See also ==
- List of township-level divisions of Beijing
