= Zhangfang, Beijing =

Zhangfang Town 张坊镇
- Town
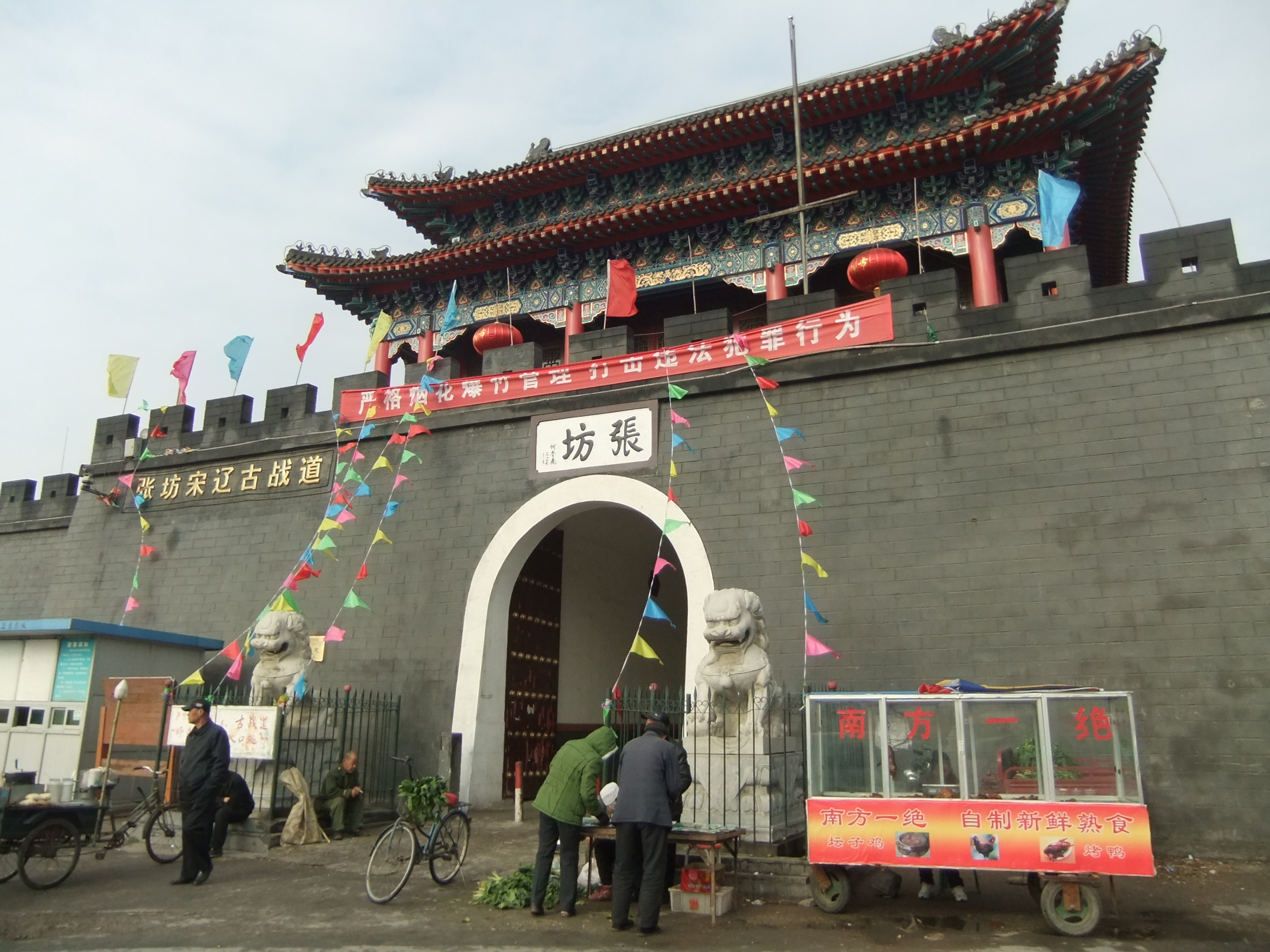
- Ancient military tunnel at Zhangfang, 2011

- Location within Beijing Location within China
- Coordinates: 39°34′32″N 115°42′40″E
- Country: China
- Municipality: Beijing
- District: Fangshan
- Village-level Divisions: 15 villages

Area
  - Total: 119.3 km^{2} (46.1 sq mi)

Population (2020)
  - Total: 18,299
  - Density: 153.4/km^{2} (397.3/sq mi)
- Time zone: UTC+8 (China Standard)
- Postal code: 102409
- Area code: 010

Zhangfang Town (simplified Chinese: 张坊镇; traditional Chinese: 張坊鎮; pinyin: Zhāngfǎng Zhèn) is a suburban town in the Fangshan District of Beijing. As of the 2020 census, it had a population of 18,299, and had an area of 119.3 square kilometres (46.1 sq mi). It is located in southwestern Beijing, approximately 80 kilometres (50 mi) southwest of the city center of Beijing.

The town was historically a crucial military station, and was named Zhangfang (Chinese: 账房; lit. 'Tent House') as a result. Later the name was corrupted to Zhangfang (张坊) of today.

== History ==
History of Zhangfang Town
Time	Status	Part of
Qing dynasty	Zhangfangli (张坊里)	Fangshan County (房山县)
1916 - 1949	8th District (八区)	Fangshan County (房山县)
1949 - 1950	2nd District (二区)	Fangshan County (房山县)
1950 - 1954	Zhangfang Township (张坊乡)	Fangshan County (房山县)
1954 - 1958	Divided among 3 townships: Zhangfang (张坊), Qianhekou (千河口) and Dongguanshang (东关上)	Fangshan County (房山县)
1958 - 1961	Zhangfang Management Area (张坊管理区), under Changgou People's Commune (长沟人民公社)	Zhoukoudian District (周口店区)
1961 - 1983	Zhangfang People's Commune (张坊人民公社)	Fangshan County
1983 - 1986	Zhangfang Township	Fangshan County
1986 - 1989	Zhangfang Township	Fangshan District (房山区)
1989–present	Zhangfang Town	Fangshan District (房山区)

== Administrative divisions ==
In the year 2021, the town was divided into 15 villages:

- Dayugou Village (大峪沟村)
- Beibaidai Village (北白岱村)
- Caijiakou Village (蔡家口村)
- Dongguanshang Village (东关上村)
- Sanhezhuang Village (三合庄村)
- Wagou Village (瓦沟村)
- Ganhekou Village (干河口村)
- Mujiakou Village (穆家口村)
- Guangluzhuang Village (广禄庄村)
- Nanbaidai Village (南白岱村)
- Xibaidai Village (西白岱村)
- Shigezhuang Village (史各庄村)
- Zhangfang Village (张坊村)
- Pianshang Village (片上村)
- Xiasi Village (下寺村)

== Geography ==
Juma River (拒马河), a tributary of the Daqing River (大清河), flows northwest to southeast through the town.

Mountains located adjacent to and visible from the townsite are: Dawajian (大洼尖), Baihujiao (白虎窖), Zhuanghushan (庄户山), and Ma'anshan (马鞍山).

== Education ==
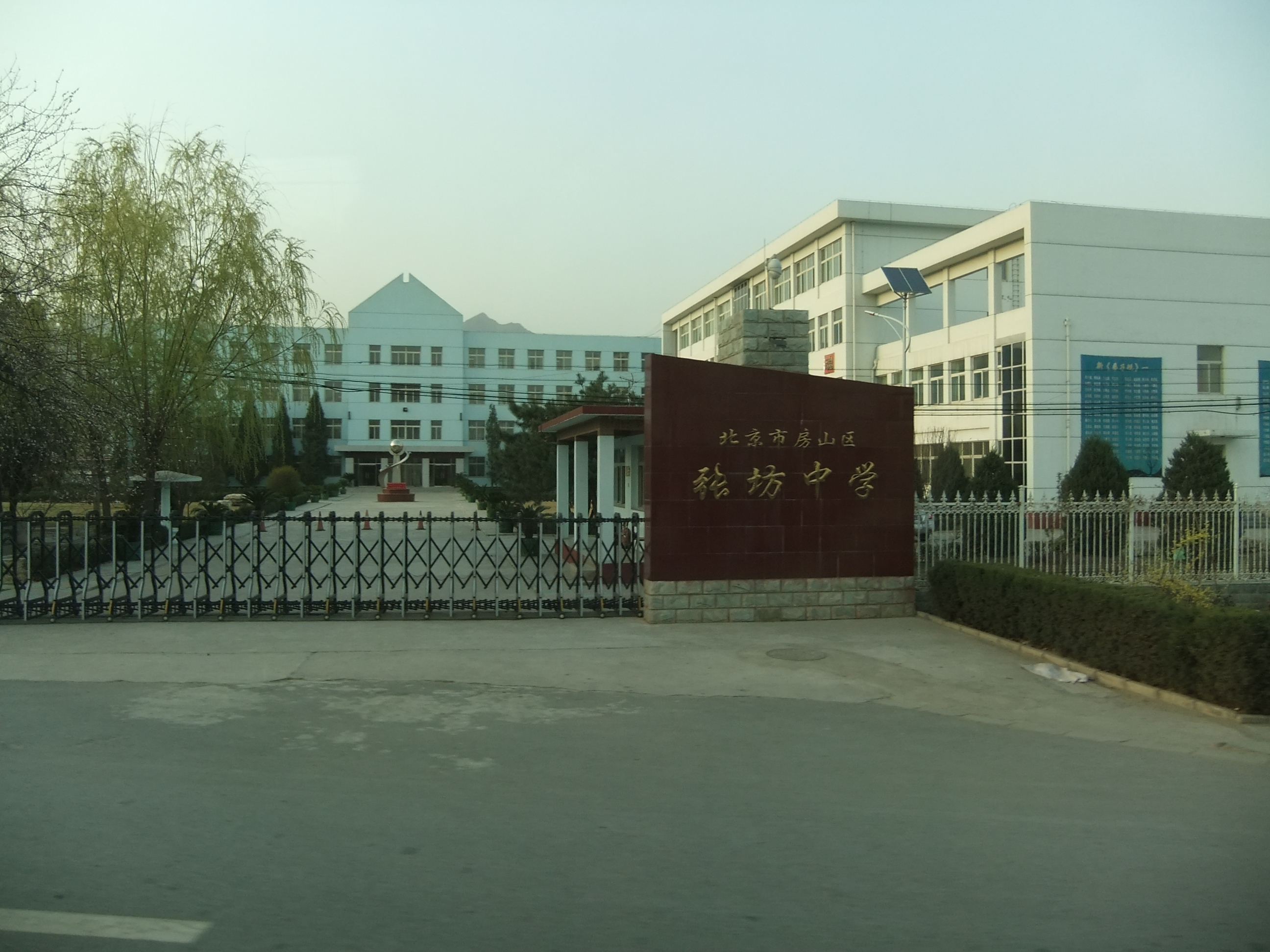
Zhangfang Middle School in 2011.

Zhangfang Town has four public primary schools and one middle school.

== Economy ==
The local economy is primarily based upon agriculture and tourism.

Persimmon is important to the local economy.

== Religion ==
Yunju Temple is a Buddhist temple in the town, which was originally built during the Northern Qi dynasty (550–570).

== Transportation ==
The Beijing–Tongliao railway, from Beijing to Tongliao in the Inner Mongolia Autonomous Region, runs through the town.

== Attractions ==
The main attractions are the Zhangfang Shang and Zhou Dynasties Site (张坊商周遗址), Xianxi Cave (仙栖洞), and Jiulong Pond (九龙潭).

== Notable people ==
- Guo Shihong (郭士红), revolutionary martyr.
- Guo Yongsheng (郭永生), revolutionary martyr.

== See also ==
- List of township-level divisions of Beijing
