= Changgou, Beijing =

Changgou Town 长沟镇
- Town
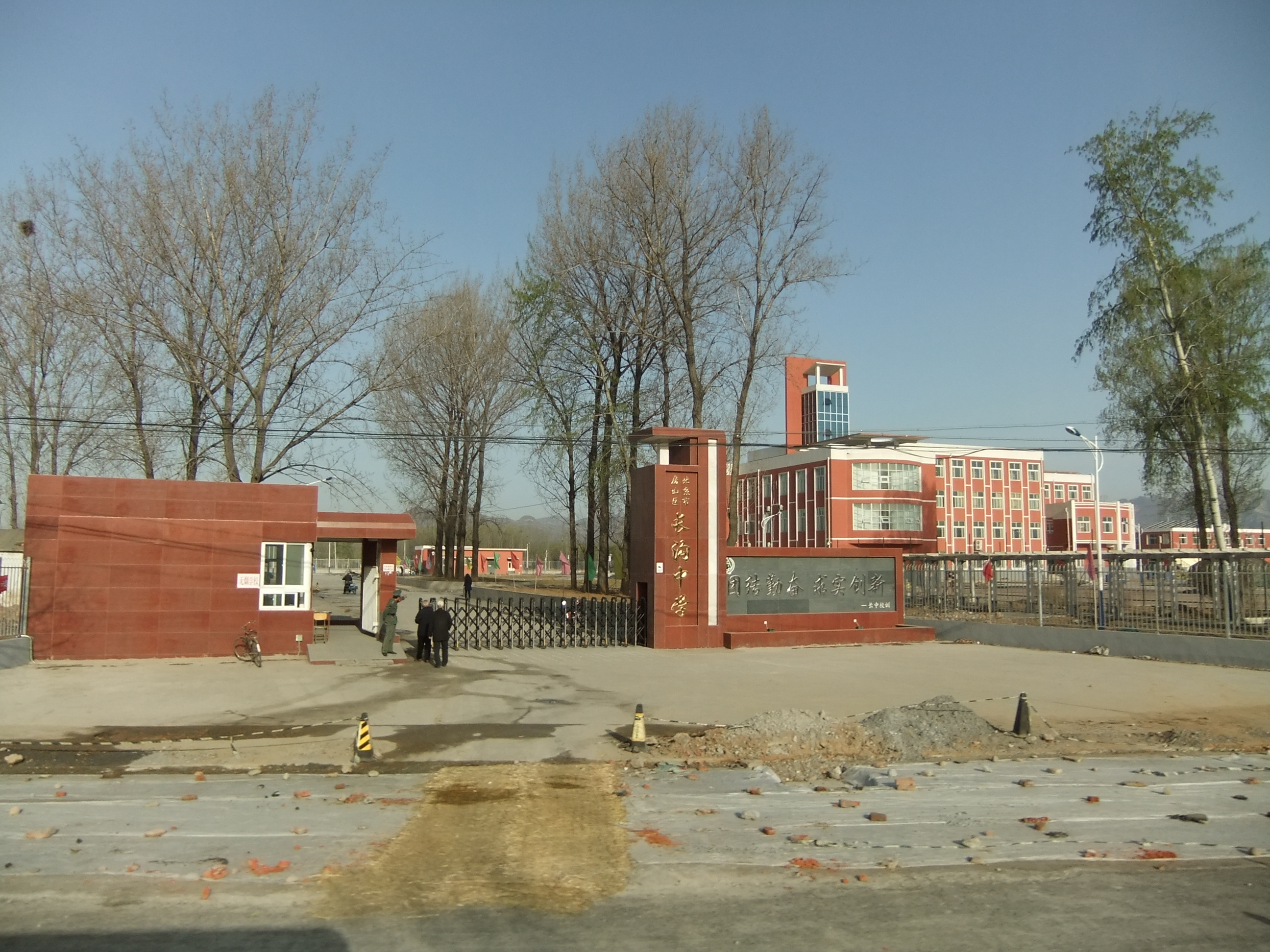
- Changgou Middle School, 2011

- Location within Beijing Location within China
- Coordinates: 39°34′45″N 115°53′42″E
- Country: China
- Municipality: Beijing
- District: Fangshan
- Village-level Divisions: 2 communities 18 villages

Area
  - Total: 39.01 km^{2} (15.06 sq mi)

Population (2020)
  - Total: 22,002
  - Density: 564.0/km^{2} (1,461/sq mi)
- Time zone: UTC+8 (China Standard)
- Postal code: 102407
- Area code: 010

Changgou Town (Chinese: 长沟镇; pinyin: Chánggōu Zhèn) is a town in the southern side of Fangshan District, Beijing, China. It is bordering Hancunhe Town to its north, Baichigan Township to its east and south, and Dashiwo Town to its west. In 2020 it had 22,002 inhabitants within its borders.

== History ==
History of Changgou Town
| Time | Status | Part of |
|---|---|---|
| Ming and Qing dynasty | Huaiyu Township | Fangshan County |
| 1916 - 1949 | 7th District | Fangshan County |
| 1949 - 1950 | 6th District | Fangshan County |
| 1950 - 1954 | 3rd District | Fangshan County |
| 1954 - 1956 | Changgou Township | Fangshan County |
| 1956 - 1958 | Changgou Town | Fangshan County |
| 1958 - 1960 | Changgou Town | Zhoukoudian District |
| 1960 - 1983 | Changgou People's Commune | Fangshan County |
| 1983 - 1986 | Changgou Township | Fangshan County |
| 1986 - 1989 | Changgou Township | Fangshan District |
| 1989–present | Changgou Town | Fangshan District |

== Administrative divisions ==
In 2021, Changgou Town had direct jurisdiction over 20 subdivisions, which were 2 communities and 18 villages:

| Administrative division code | Subdivision names | Name transliteration | Type |
|---|---|---|---|
| 110111108001 | 西厢苑 | Xixiangyuan | Community |
| 110111108002 | 长荷苑 | Changheyuan | Community |
| 110111108200 | 南正 | Nanzheng | Village |
| 110111108201 | 北正 | Beizheng | Village |
| 110111108202 | 双磨 | Shuangmo | Village |
| 110111108203 | 南良各庄 | Nan Lianggezhuang | Village |
| 110111108204 | 北良各庄 | Bei Lianggezhuang | Village |
| 110111108205 | 东良各庄 | Dong Lianggezhuang | Village |
| 110111108206 | 东长沟 | Dong Changgou | Village |
| 110111108207 | 西长沟 | Xi Changgou | Village |
| 110111108208 | 太和庄 | Taihezhuang | Village |
| 110111108209 | 沿村 | Yancun | Village |
| 110111108210 | 坟庄 | Fenzhuang | Village |
| 110111108211 | 东甘池 | Dong Ganchi | Village |
| 110111108212 | 南甘池 | Nan Ganchi | Village |
| 110111108213 | 北甘池 | Bei Ganchi | Village |
| 110111108214 | 西甘池 | Xi Ganchi | Village |
| 110111108215 | 六甲房 | Liujiafang | Village |
| 110111108216 | 三座庵 | Sanzuo'ang | Village |
| 110111108217 | 黄元井 | Huangyuanjing | Village |

== See also ==
- List of township-level divisions of Beijing
