= Gongchen Subdistrict, Beijing =

Gongchen Subdistrict 拱辰街道
- Subdistrict
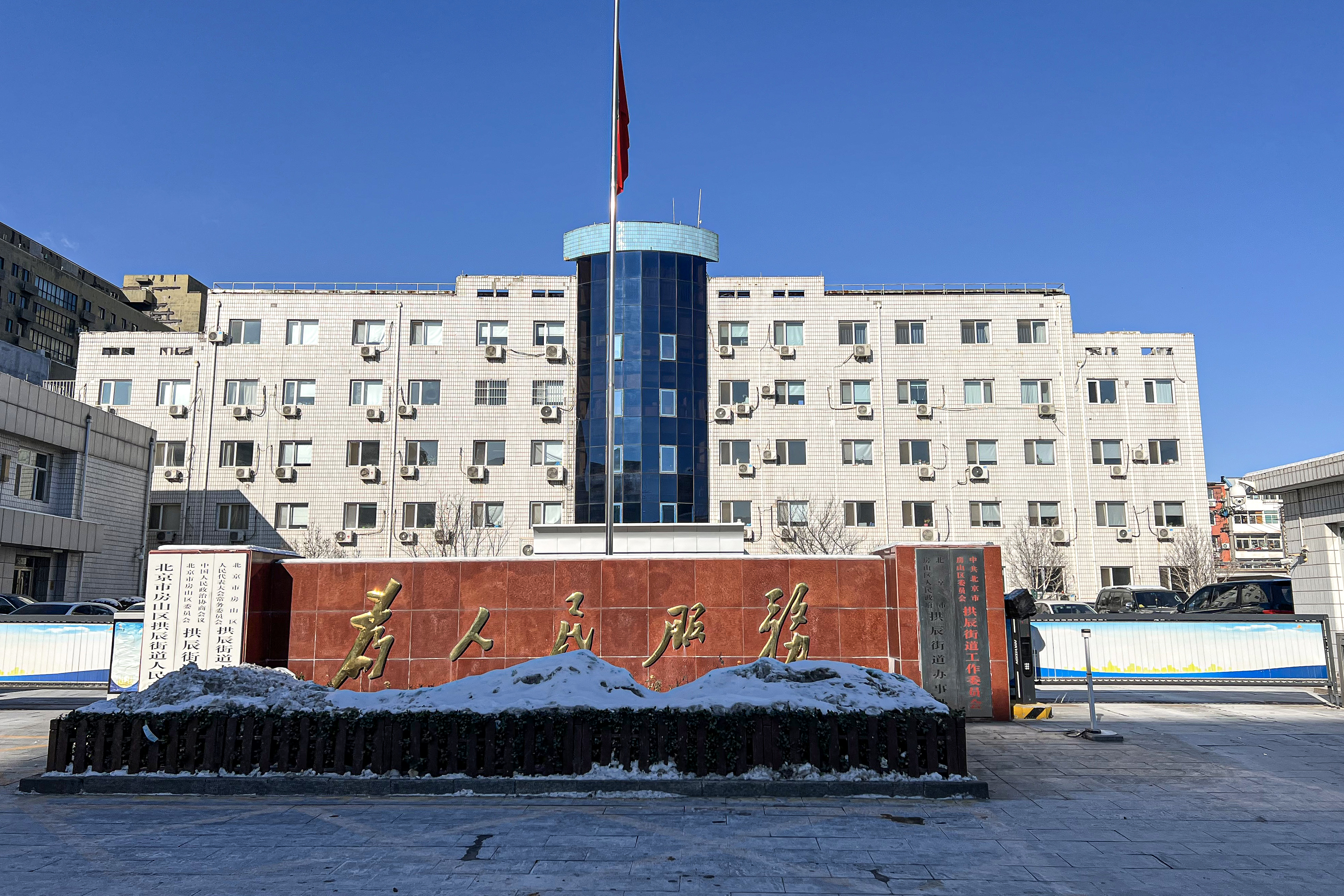
- Headquarters of Gongchen Subdistrict, formerly the town hall of Liangxiang

- Location within Beijing Location within China
- Coordinates: 39°43′48″N 116°08′14″E
- Country: China
- Municipality: Beijing
- District: Fangshan
- Village-level Divisions: 37 communities 18 villages

Area
  - Total: 27.78 km^{2} (10.73 sq mi)

Population (2020)
  - Total: 214,622
  - Density: 7,726/km^{2} (20,010/sq mi)
- Time zone: UTC+8 (China Standard)
- Postal code: 102401
- Area code: 010

Gongchen Subdistrict (Chinese: 拱辰街道; pinyin: Gǒngchén Jiēdào) is a subdistrict in the eastern portion of Fangshan District, Beijing, China. It borders Wangzuo Town in the north, Changyang Town in the east, Liangxiang Town in the south, Yancun Town and Xilu Subdistrict in the west. It contained 214,622 inhabitants in the year 2020.

The name of the subdistrict Gongchen (Chinese: 拱辰; lit. 'Surround Morning') came from the historical name of the northern city gate of Liangxiang.

== History ==
Timeline of Gongchen Subdistrict
Year	Status
1916	Under the 1st Central District of Liangxiang County
1949	Under Chengxiang District of Liangxiang County
1951	Under the 1st District of Liangxiang County
1953	Under Liangxiang Town of Liangxiang County
1956	Under Chengguan Town of Liangxiang County
1958	Incorporatwed into Liangxiang People's Commune
1960	Under Fangshan County
1966	Liangxiang Town was formed
1968	Liangxiang Town was incorporated into Liangxiang People's Commune
1979	Reinstated as a town
1989	Reorganized into Liangxiang Area
1999	Became a town while retaining the status of an area
2001	Incorporated Guandao Town
2005	Liangxiang Town was divided into three parts, the northeastern portion became Gongchen Subdistrict

== Administrative Divisions ==
In 2021, Gongchen Subdistrict oversaw 55 subdivisions, including 37 communities and 18 villages:

Administrative division code	Subdivision names	Name transliteration	Type
110111011001	一街	Yijie	Community
110111011002	三街	Erjie	Community
110111011003	拱辰大街	Gongchen Dajie	Community
110111011004	宜春里	Yichunli	Community
110111011005	梅花庄	Meihuazhuang	Community
110111011006	北关东路	Bei Guandonglu	Community
110111011007	行宫园	Xinggongyuan	Community
110111011008	长虹北里	Changhong Beili	Community
110111011009	昊天小区	Haotian Xiaoqu	Community
110111011010	北京电力设备总厂	Beijing Dianli Shebei Zongchang	Community
110111011011	北京送变电公司	Beijing Songbiandian Gongsi	Community
110111011012	北京电力建设公司	Beijing Dianli Jianshe Gongsi	Community
110111011013	飞机场	Feijichang	Community
110111011014	一街第二	Yijie Di'er	Community
110111011015	文化路	Wenhualu	Community
110111011016	罗府街	Luofujie	Community
110111011017	三街第二	Sanjie Di'er	Community
110111011018	拱辰北大街	Gongchen Bei Dajie	Community
110111011019	西北关	Xibeiguan	Community
110111011020	鸿顺园	Hongshunyuan	Community
110111011021	玉竹园	Yuzhuyuan	Community
110111011022	伟业嘉园	Weiye Jiayuan	Community
110111011023	瑞雪春堂	Ruixue Chuntang	Community
110111011024	绿地花都苑	Lüdi Huaduyuan	Community
110111011025	翠林湾嘉园	Cuilinwan Jiayuan	Community
110111011026	邑尚佳苑	Yishang Jiayuan	Community
110111011027	紫汇家园	Zihui JIayuan	Community
110111011028	伟创嘉园	Weichuan Jiayuan	Community
110111011029	胜茂嘉苑	Shengmao Jiayuan	Community
110111011030	翠堤清苑	Cuidi Qingyuan	Community
110111011031	绿湾星苑	Lüwan Xingyuan	Community
110111011032	伊林郡	Yilinjun	Community
110111011033	意墅园	Yishuyuan	Community
110111011034	智汇雅苑	Zhihui Yayuan	Community
110111011035	东羊庄	Dongyangzhuang	Community
110111011036	二街	Erjie	Community
110111011037	睿府嘉园	Ruifu Jiayuan	Community
110111011200	二街	Erjie	Village
110111011201	四街	Sijie	Village
110111011202	五街	Wujie	Village
110111011203	南关	Nanguan	Village
110111011204	东关	Dongguan	Village
110111011205	后店	Houdian	Village
110111011206	吴店	Wudian	Village
110111011207	黄辛庄	Huangxinzhuang	Village
110111011208	渔儿沟	Yu'ergou	Village
110111011209	大南关	Dananyuan	Village
110111011210	纸房	Zhifang	Village
110111011211	常庄	Changzhuang	Village
110111011213	梨村	Lishu	Village
110111011215	东羊庄	Dongyangzhuang	Village
110111011216	梅花庄	Meihuazhuang	Village
110111011217	小西庄	Xiaoxizhuang	Village
110111011218	辛瓜地	Xinguadi	Village
110111011219	南广阳城	Nan Guangyangchneg	Village

== Landmark ==
- Haotian Pagoda

== See also ==
- List of township-level divisions of Beijing
