= Chengguan Subdistrict, Beijing =

Chengguan Subdistrict 城关街道
- Subdistrict
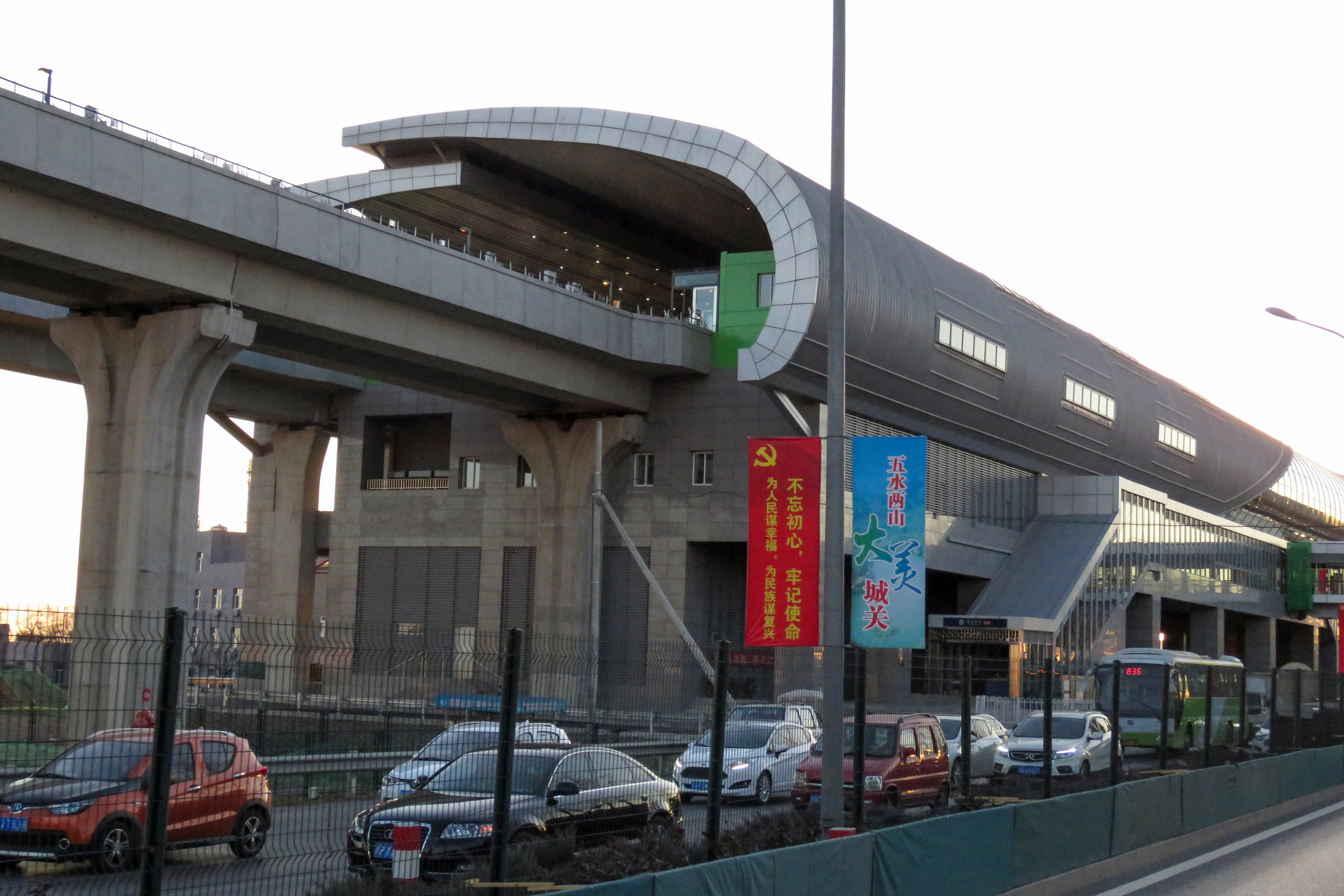
- Raolefu Station within the subdistrict, 2017

- Location within Beijing Location within China
- Coordinates: 39°42′07″N 115°58′16″E
- Country: China
- Municipality: Beijing
- District: Fangshan
- Village-level Divisions: 24 communities 22 villages

Area
  - Total: 50.65 km^{2} (19.56 sq mi)

Population (2020)
  - Total: 121,242
  - Density: 2,394/km^{2} (6,200/sq mi)
- Time zone: UTC+8 (China Standard)
- Postal code: 102400
- Area code: 010

Chengguan Subdistrict (Chinese: 城关街道; pinyin: Chéngguān Jiēdào) is a subdistrict on the eastern side of Fangshan District, Beijing, China. It borders Yingfeng, XIngyang, Dongfeng Subdistricts to the north, Qinglonghu Town to the northeast, Yancun and Doudian Towns to the east, Shilou Town to the south, Yingfeng Subdistrict and Zhoukoudian Town to the west. Its total population was 121,242 as of 2020.

The name Chengguan (Chinese: 城关; lit. 'City Pass') refers to the region's historical location near the city gate. Since a lot of places in China inherited their names from a time when city gates still existed, the name Chengguan appears in many of them, including Qingdao, Lanzhou, Lhasa, among others.

== History ==
Timetable of Chengguan Subdistrict
Year	Status
1189	Part of Wanning County
1191	Part of Fengxian County
1290	Part of Fangshan County
1916	Part of the 1st District of Fangshan County
1949	Created as Chengguan District, Fnagshan County
1950	Chengguan District changed to Chengguan Township
1954	Chengguan Township changed to Chengguan Town
1958	Reformed to Chengguan People's Commune
1979	Reverted into a town
1989	Reformed into Fangshan Subdistrict
1998	Renamed to Chengguan Subdistrict

== Administrative Divisions ==
In the year 2021, Chengguan Subdistrict had 46 subdivisions, more specifically 24 communities and 22 villages:

Administrative division code	Subdivision names	Name transliteration	Type
110111001001	万宁桥	Wanningqiao	Community
110111001002	城北	Chengbei	Community
110111001003	北里	Beili	Community
110111001004	北街	Beijie	Community
110111001005	永安西里	Yong'an Xili	Community
110111001006	南里	Nanli	Community
110111001007	南城	Nancheng	Community
110111001008	农林路	Nonglinlu	Community
110111001009	南沿里	Nanyanli	Community
110111001010	新东关	Xindongguan	Community
110111001011	大石河	Dashihe	Community
110111001024	矿机	Kuangji	Community
110111001025	管道局	Guandaoju	Community
110111001026	化工四厂	Huagong Sichang	Community
110111001032	城东	Chengdong	Community
110111001033	永乐园	Yongleyuan	Community
110111001034	永兴达	Yongxingda	Community
110111001035	兴房东里	Xingfang Dongli	Community
110111001036	福星家园	Fuxing Jiayuan	Community
110111001037	府东里	Fudongli	Community
110111001038	永安家园	Yong'an Jiayuan	Community
110111001039	蓝城家园	Lancheng Jiayuan	Community
110111001040	原香嘉苑	Yuanxiang Jiayuan	Community
110111001041	原香漫谷	Yuanxiang Mangu	Community
110111001200	顾册	Guce	Village
110111001201	北市	Beishi	Village
110111001202	东坟	Dongfen	Village
110111001203	辛庄	Xinzhuang	Village
110111001204	东瓜地	Dongguadi	Village
110111001205	田各庄	Tiangezhuang	Village
110111001206	瓜市	Guashi	Village
110111001207	马各庄	Magezhuang	Village
110111001208	饶乐府	Raolefu	Village
110111001209	丁家洼	Dingjiawa	Village
110111001210	羊头岗	Yangtougang	Village
110111001211	八十亩地	Bashimudi	Village
110111001212	前朱各庄	Qian Zhugezhuang	Village
110111001213	后朱各庄	Hou Zhugezhuang	Village
110111001214	洪寺	Hongsi	Village
110111001215	塔湾	Tawan	Village
110111001216	迎风坡	Yingfengpo	Village
110111001217	东街	Dongjie	Village
110111001218	南街	Nanjie	Village
110111001219	南关	Nanguan	Village
110111001220	西街	Xijie	Village
110111001221	北关	Beiguan	Village

== See also ==
- List of township-level divisions of Beijing
