= Xiangyang Subdistrict, Beijing =

Xiangyang Subdistrict 向阳街道
- Subdistrict
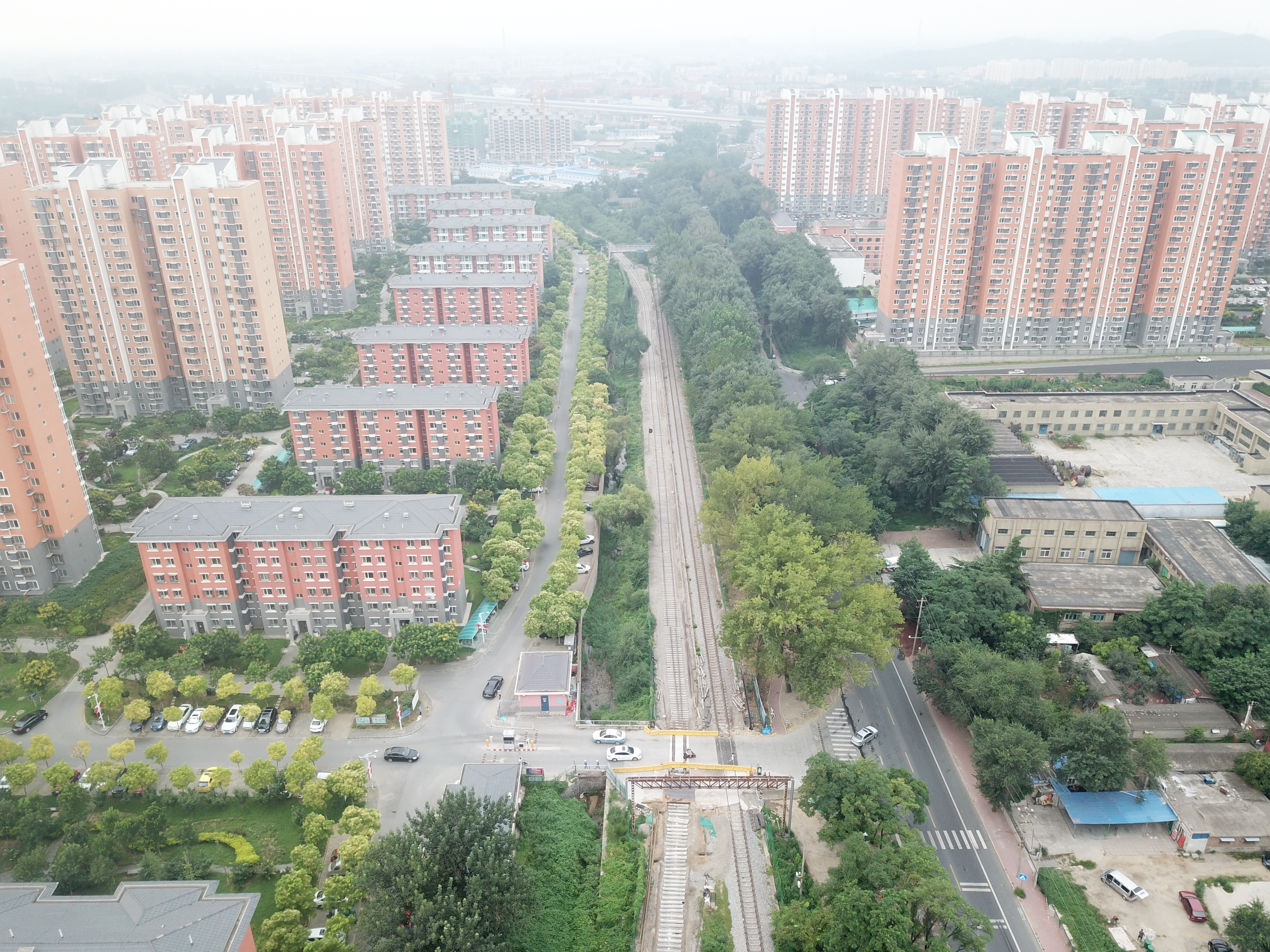
- Fangshan Railway that passes through Xiangtang Subdistrict, 2018

- Location within Beijing Location within China
- Coordinates: 39°44′10″N 115°57′08″E
- Country: China
- Municipality: Beijing
- District: Fangshan
- Village-level Divisions: 5 communities

Area
  - Total: 15.3 km^{2} (5.9 sq mi)

Population (2020)
  - Total: 19,142
  - Density: 1,250/km^{2} (3,240/sq mi)
- Time zone: UTC+8 (China Standard)
- Postal code: 102599
- Area code: 010

Xiangyang Subdistrict (Chinese: 向阳街道; pinyin: Xiàngyáng Jiēdào) is a subdistrict in Fangshan District, Beijing, China. As of 2020, it had 19,142 residents under its administration.

== History ==
Timeline of changes in the status of Xiangyang Subdistrict
Year	Status
1975	Created as Xiangyanglu Subdistrict
1980	Under Yanshan District
1984	Southeastern portion was separated away and formed Yingfeng Subdistrict
2002	Incorporated Liyuan Subdistrict

== Administrative Divisions ==
As of 2021, Xiangyang Subdistrict was divided into 5 residential communities, which are listed as follows:

Administrative division code	Subdivision names	Name transliteration
110111004001	向阳里	Xiangyangli
110111004008	宏塔	Hongta
110111004010	燕东路	Yandonglu
110111004011	富燕新村第一	Fuyan Xincun Diyi
110111004012	富燕新村第二	Fuyan Xincun Di'er

== See also ==
- List of township-level divisions of Beijing
