= Dabaotai Western Han Dynasty Mausoleum =

Historic site and museum in Beijing, China

Beijing Dabaotai Western Han Dynasty Mausoleum
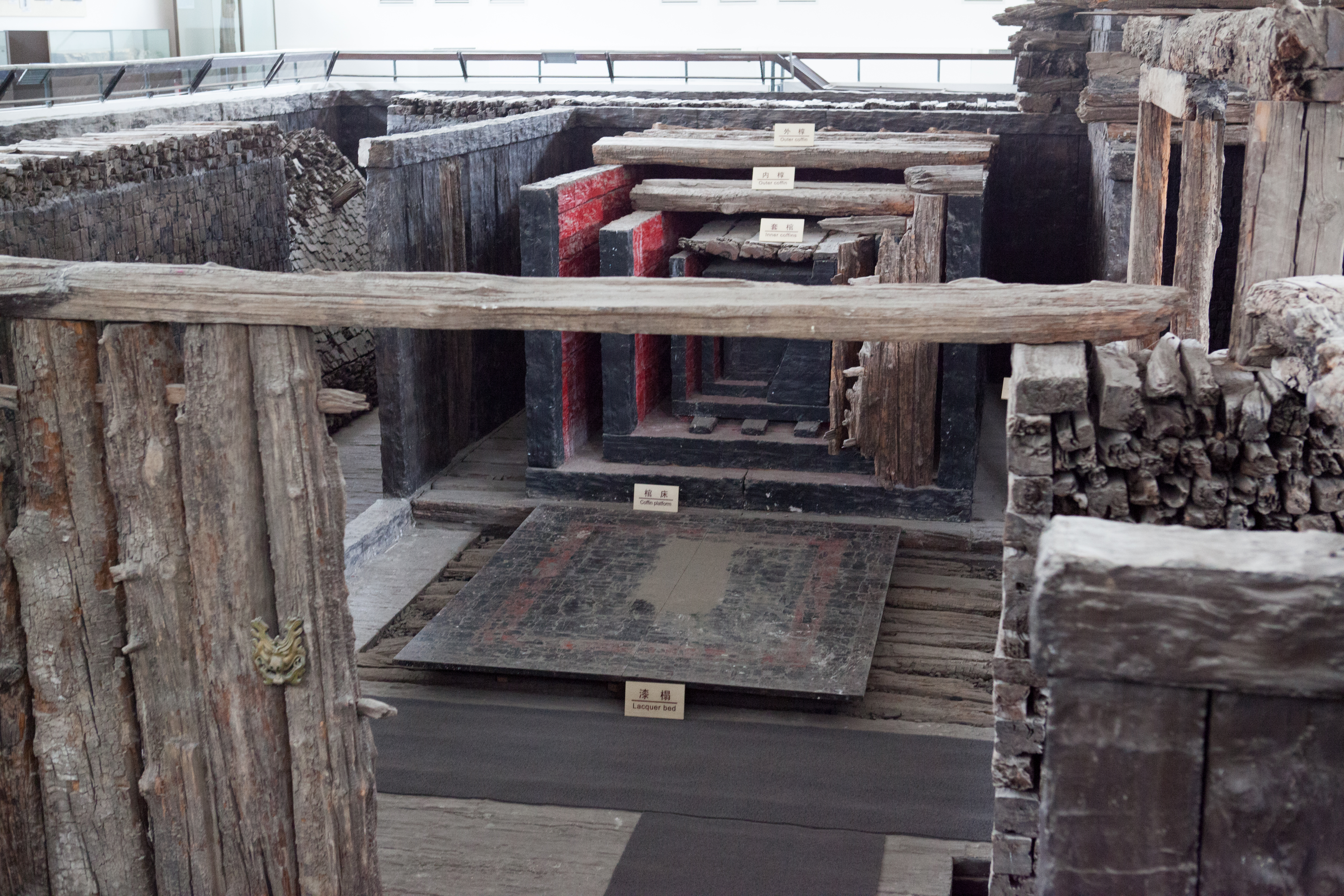
- Beijing Dabaotai Western Han Dynasty Mausoleum
- Established: 1983
- Location: Beijing
- Coordinates: 39°48′18″N 116°17′26″E
- Type: Historical site, history museum
- Public transit access: Public bus, subway

The Beijing Dabaotai Western Han Dynasty Mausoleum (Chinese: 北京大葆台西汉墓博物馆) is a museum built over the tombs of Western Han dynasty prince Liu Jian and his wife at Dabaotai in Fengtai District of southwestern Beijing Municipality about 15 km (9.3 mi) southwest of Beijing's city centre. The two tombs are over 2,000 years old and were discovered in 1974. Also discovered in the vicinity are remnants of a residence from the Jin dynasty (1115–1234).

The museum opened in 1983 and has been closed since 2012 for renovation and expansion.

== History ==
Liu Jian was the Prince of Guangyang who ruled the Guangyang State, a royal fiefdom that administered four counties in the Beijing region during the Western Han dynasty. His father Liu Dan, also a prince, was stripped of his royal title for conspiring against the Han Emperor Zhao and the State of Guangyang was demoted to a prefecture. During the reign of Han Emperor Xuan, the family's royal status was restored and Liu Jian became prince. He ruled for about 29 years from 73 BC to 45 BC. His descendants continued to rule as princes of Guangyang until Wang Mang overthrew the Western Han dynasty.

Liu Jian's tomb was discovered in 1974 by workers of the East is Red Petrochemical Refinery who were digging inside two mounds of earth in Dabaotai village to bury storage tanks. They discovered charcoal, plaster and ancient coins. Chinese archaeologists called to inspect the site discovered Tomb No. 1. The tomb had been looted and burned in antiquity. Charred bone remnants indicates that the entombed was a male of about 45–55 years old. Archaeologists identified the tomb as belonging to Liu Jian using artifacts and historical records. Based on the scale of the tomb, they determined that the buried was a royal prince. Inscription on a piece of lacquerware found inside the tomb indicates that the ware was made in the 24th year of the reign of the owner. According to historical records, only four princes in the Han dynasty ruled the Beijing region for as long as 24 years. Based on coins found in the tomb that date to 118 BC, two of the princes who died prior to that date were eliminated. The tomb of a third prince, Liu Dan who was Liu Jian's father had already been found in Shijingshan District, leaving Liu Jian as the only possible resident prince of the tomb.

In 1975, Tomb No. 2, belonging to Liu Jian's wife, was excavated. During the excavation, archaeologists also found Jin-era artifacts including a brick well between the two tombs and remnants of a residence. Jin dynasty records indicate that Dabaotai, located about 15 km south of the Jin capital Zhongdu, was a country retreat for Consort Li of the Emperor Zhangzong, who ruled from 1189 to 1208. The name Dabaotai, which means Grand Terrace for Convalescence, is derived from Consort Li's visits. Jin-era coins found at the site dates to Zhangzong's reign. Based on these facts, archaeologists believe the Jin residence and well may have been part of Consort Li's country retreat.

The Jin-era artifacts were also incorporated into the mausoleum, which opened on December 1, 1983 and was designated a major historical landmark of Beijing in 1995. The museum covered an area of 18,000 m^{2} (190,000 sq ft).

The museum closed in July 2012 due to flooding damage from torrential rains and briefly reopened in September before closing for extensive repairs. Due to drainage problems, the museum was flooded in the summer of 2013 and 2015 and remained closed. In October 2015, the Beijing Cultural Bureau announced extensive expansion for the museum. As of January 2017, no completion date had been given but the museum was expected to remain closed for several more years.

== Tombs ==
The two tombs are located 26.5 m (87 ft) apart and both shaped in the character 凸. Both face the south and are 4.7 m (15 ft) deep. The Prince's tomb measures 23.2 m (76 ft) from north to south and 18 m (59 ft) from east to west. His wife's tomb is slightly smaller, measuring 17.7 m (58 ft) from north to south and 11.75 m (38.5 ft) meters from east to west. The interior space of the Prince's tomb at 417.6 m^{2} (4,495 sq ft) is larger than that of the Qianlong Emperor's tomb, which is only 300 m^{2} (3,200 sq ft).

Inside each tomb is an antechamber, burial chamber, storeroom and connecting passageways. The tomb's ceiling and floor are lined with charcoal and plaster. The plaster acts as a seal against outside air. The charcoal absorbs moisture inside the tomb. The tomb is surrounded by several layers of earthen and wooden walls.

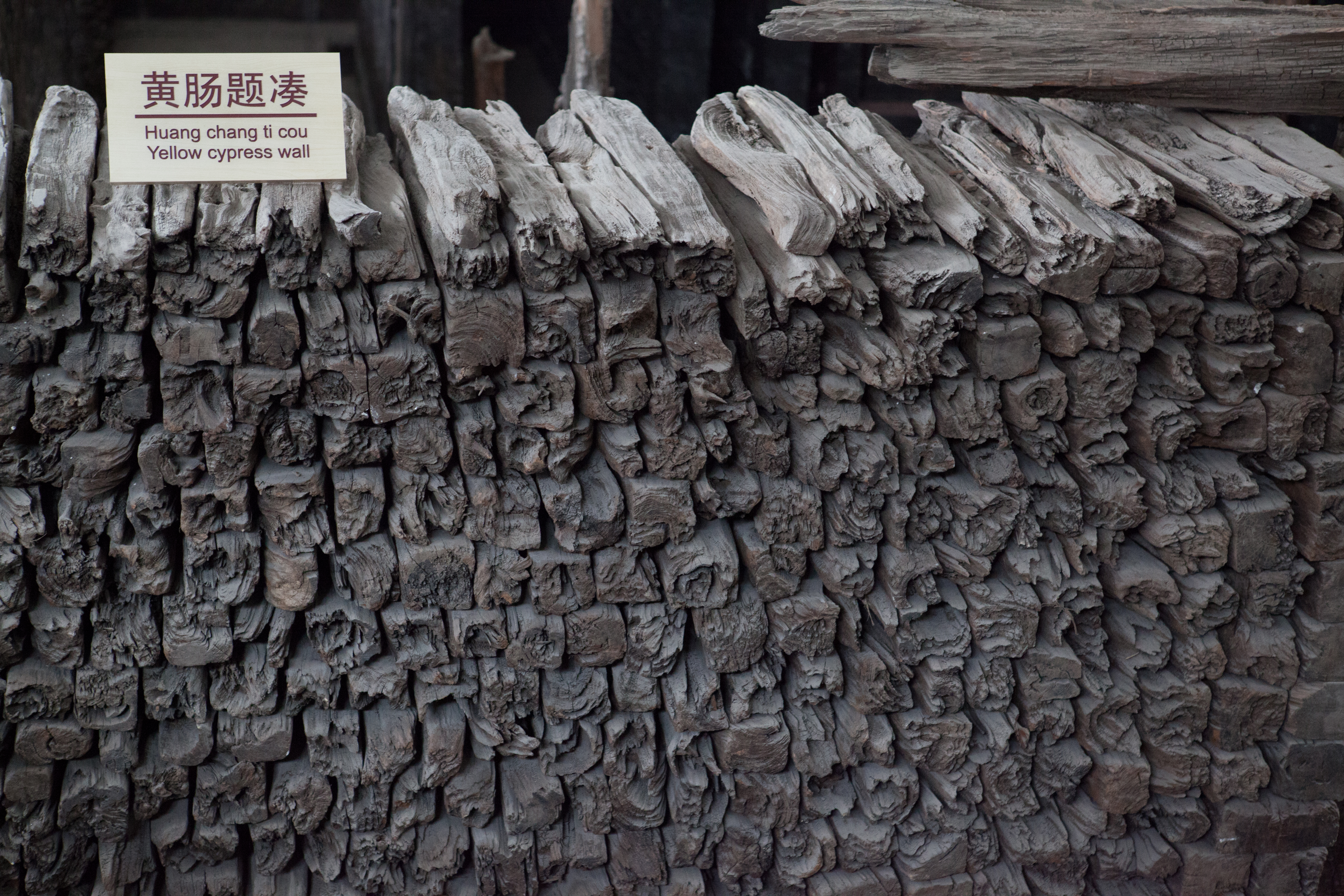
Wall of yellow cypress wood

The most distinctive feature of the Dabaotai tombs is a wall of evenly cut yellow cypress wood piled 2.7 m (8.9 ft) high that separate the tomb's outer and inner hallways. Each piece of wood is 10 by 10 by 90 cm (3.9 by 3.9 by 35.4 in). The entire wall in the Prince's tomb is 42 m (138 ft) long. Various records from antiquity have documented the cypress wall as a feature of royal Han tombs and those of nobles who were bestowed with the honor. The imperial tombs of the Western Han emperors had all been looted and destroyed in antiquity, so archaeologists had not seen such a wall until the Dabaotai excavation. Since the 1970s, the tombs of Han princes in Hebei, Hunan and Jiangsu have also been found with cypress walls intact.

In the south cypress wall is a door of about 3 m (9.8 ft) high and 3.6 m (12 ft) wide. A gilded bronze door knocker, 24.5 cm (9.6 in), is made in the shape of a beast head. The beast head was used to ward off evil spirits. Bronzeware, which was quite common in Qin and Western Han dynasty tombs was almost completely replaced by ironware by the Eastern Han dynasty. Dabaotai represents this transition period. An iron axe found inside the tomb was stamped with the character 渔 for Yuyang, the name of the county near Guangyang where the item was made.

Inside the tomb, the chambers are well preserved. In Liu Jian's tomb, the antechamber replicates the master's sitting room. To the north is the burial chamber, which contains a five-layered casket made from the yellow catalpa tree. Yellow catalpa, also called Chinese catalpa, was a rare wood that appears only in imperial tombs of the Western Han dynasty. Scrap pieces of jade and a jade pillow in the burial chamber suggests that the body had been clothed in a jade suit.

Though the tomb was looted, some 400 pieces of bronze, jade, agate, silk, lacquer, and pottery artifacts have been recovered along with household wares. Several clay pots in the hallways stored rice and chestnuts. Others stored pork, chicken, pheasant, rabbit, swan goose and carp. Bones of a cat, collared crow, goats and oxen were also found. Buried in a hallway outside the cypress wall are remnants of three horses and one leopard. In all, the tombs have 11 horses and three chariots. One of the chariots, painted black and red, is adorned with gold-plated hardware. Scattered throughout the outer parts of the tomb are terra cotta clay figurines of maid servants. Eight ivory pieces from a liubo game set were found in the antechamber and inner hallway. Four of the pieces have a carved flying dragon on the oblique side. The other four pieces have a carved leaping tiger.

== Jin dynasty artifacts ==
A Jin dynasty courtyard home stood in the vicinity of the two tombs and yielded over 1,000 artifacts including porcelain, pottery, ironware and coins. The brick well between the two tombs is among the best preserved Jin-era wells in Beijing. The well's opening rises 1.8 m (5.9 ft) from the Jin-era ground level, and has a diameter of 1.4 m (4.6 ft) and depth of 8 m (26 ft). The well is lined with 17 by 4 cm (6.7 by 1.6 in) grey bricks. Among the items found in the well is a fragment of a Chinese chess board, the oldest to be found in China.

== Access ==
Until the summer of 2012, the museum was open every day except Mondays and admission was free. Since September 2012, the museum has been closed for renovation and expansion.

The museum is located on Fengbao Lu and is surrounded by Huaxiang Park. About 500 m (550 yd) to the northwest is the Dabaotai Station of Beijing Subway Fangshan Line. Public bus stops nearby include Beijing World Park (世界公园公交总站) (477, 692), Dabaotai Subway Station (地铁大葆台站) (840, 959, 967) and Baotai Lu (葆台路站) (480, 969).

== See also ==
- History of Beijing
- List of museums in China
