= Liangxiang, Beijing =

Liangxiang Town 良乡镇
- Town
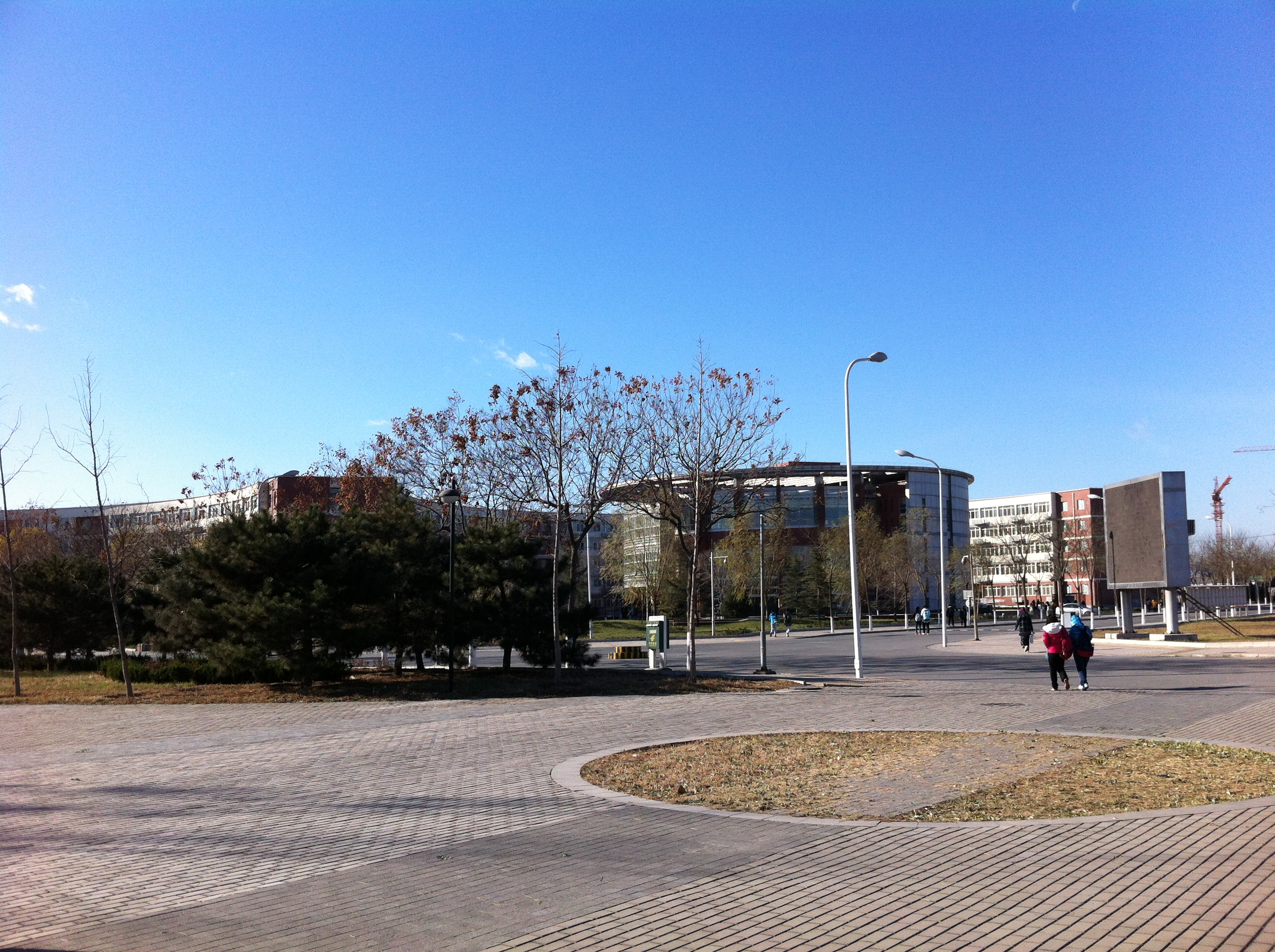
- Liangxiang Campus of Capital Normal University, 2013

- Location within Beijing Location within China
- Coordinates: 39°43′33″N 116°08′07″E
- Country: China
- Municipality: Beijing
- District: Fangshan
- Village-level Divisions: 2 communities 16 villages

Area
  - Total: 26.11 km^{2} (10.08 sq mi)

Population (2020)
  - Total: 24,317
  - Density: 931.3/km^{2} (2,412/sq mi)
- Time zone: UTC+8 (China Standard)
- Postal code: 102446
- Area code: 010

Liangxiang Town (Chinese: 良乡镇; pinyin: Liángxiāng Zhèn) is a town in Fangshan District, located 25 km southwest of the city center. It borders Gongchen Subdistrict to its north, Changyang Town to its east, Doudian Town to its south, and Yancun Town to its west. It had 24,317 registered inhabitants as of 2020.

== History ==
Liangxiang county was established during the Qin dynasty of 221 BCE to 206 BCE. Its name came from the Chinese saying '人物俱良', literally: "people and goods all gather in Liang", indicating significant economic activities in the past. As the land is relatively fertile and flat, it was suitable for agriculture, contributing to its prosperity. In 1958, Liangxiang county (良乡县) merged with Fangshan county and was renamed Liangxiang town (良乡镇). On January 24, 2002, another merger, this time with Guandao (官道镇), took place. The new Liangxiang township became the political, cultural and economic centre of Fangshan district and houses the district seat.

== Infrastructure ==
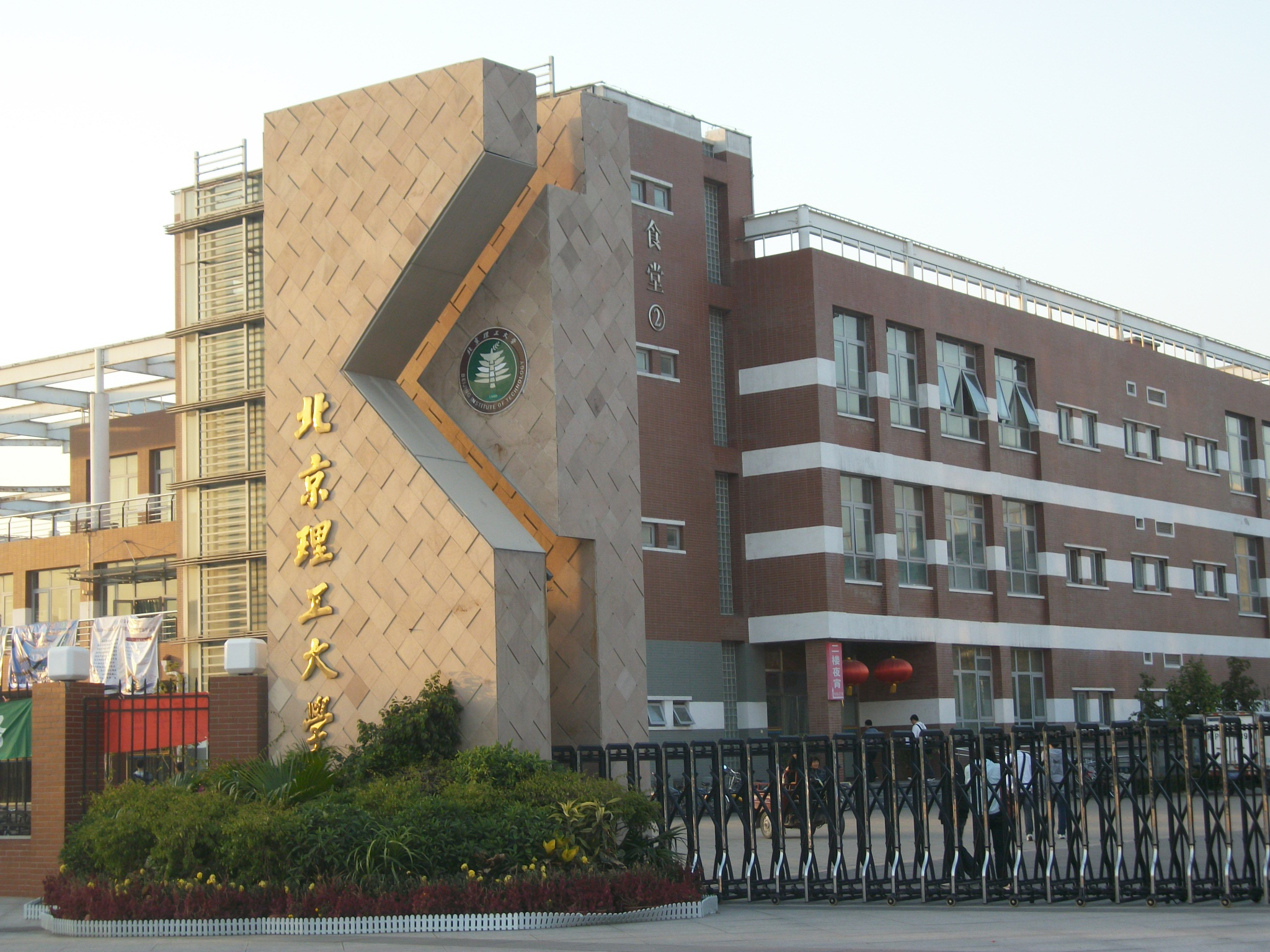
BIT campus, Liangxiang University Town

6th Ring Road and Jingshi Expressway have exist connecting to Liangxiang. A small military airport is situated next to one of the exits, in the northwest. Basic facilities such as postal offices, telecommunication offices, 2 day care centers, 14 primary and secondary schools and a hospital are also present.

Recently, a few universities including Capital Normal University, Beijing Institute of Technology, Capital University of Medical Sciences and Beijing Technology and Business University decided to open additional campuses in the new University Town of Liangxiang, which houses over 100,000 students.

== Transport ==
=== Beijing Subway ===
Public transportation access has improved since opening of the Fangshan line of Beijing Subway, with 4 stations within Liangxiang (Liangxiang Nanguan, Liangxiang Univ. Town North, Liangxiang Univ. Town and Liangxiang Univ. Town West).

=== China Railway ===
Beijing-Guangzhou Railway pass through Liangxiang. Liangxiang railway station is located in Liangxiang.

=== Bus ===
Bus lines 616, 646 and 917 can be used to get to Beijing city centre.

== Landmark ==
Historical heritages such as Haotian Pagoda, Yue Yi Tomb, Liangxiang Confucius Temple (良乡文庙) and Xiuyunguan (岫云观 or 良乡离宫) are popular tourist attractions.

== Administrative divisions ==
In 2021, Liangxiang contained 2 communities and 16 administrative villages (行政村).

Administrative division code	Subdivision names	Name transliteration	Type
110111008001	尚锦佳苑	Shangjin Jiayuan	Community
110111008002	舒朗苑	Shulangyuan	Community
110111008226	南刘庄	Nanliuzhuang	Village
110111008227	西石羊	Xi Shiyang	Village
110111008228	后石羊	Hou Shiyang	Village
110111008229	东石羊	Dong Shiyang	Village
110111008230	张谢	Zhangxie	Village
110111008231	江村	Jiangcun	Village
110111008232	侯庄	Houzhuang	Village
110111008233	下禅坊	Xiachanfang	Village
110111008234	刘丈	Liuzhang	Village
110111008235	南庄子	Nanzhuangzi	Village
110111008236	邢家坞	Xingjiawu	Village
110111008237	官道	Guandao	Village
110111008238	小营	Xiaoying	Village
110111008239	鲁村	Lucun	Village
110111008240	黑古台	Heigutai	Village
110111008241	富庄	Fuzhuang	Village

== See also ==
- Beijing
- Fangshan District
- Haotian Pagoda
- List of township-level divisions of Beijing
