= Capital Univ. of Economics & Business station =

Beijing Subway station

Coordinates: 39.8445°N 116.3202°E

Capital Univ. of Economics & Business 首经贸
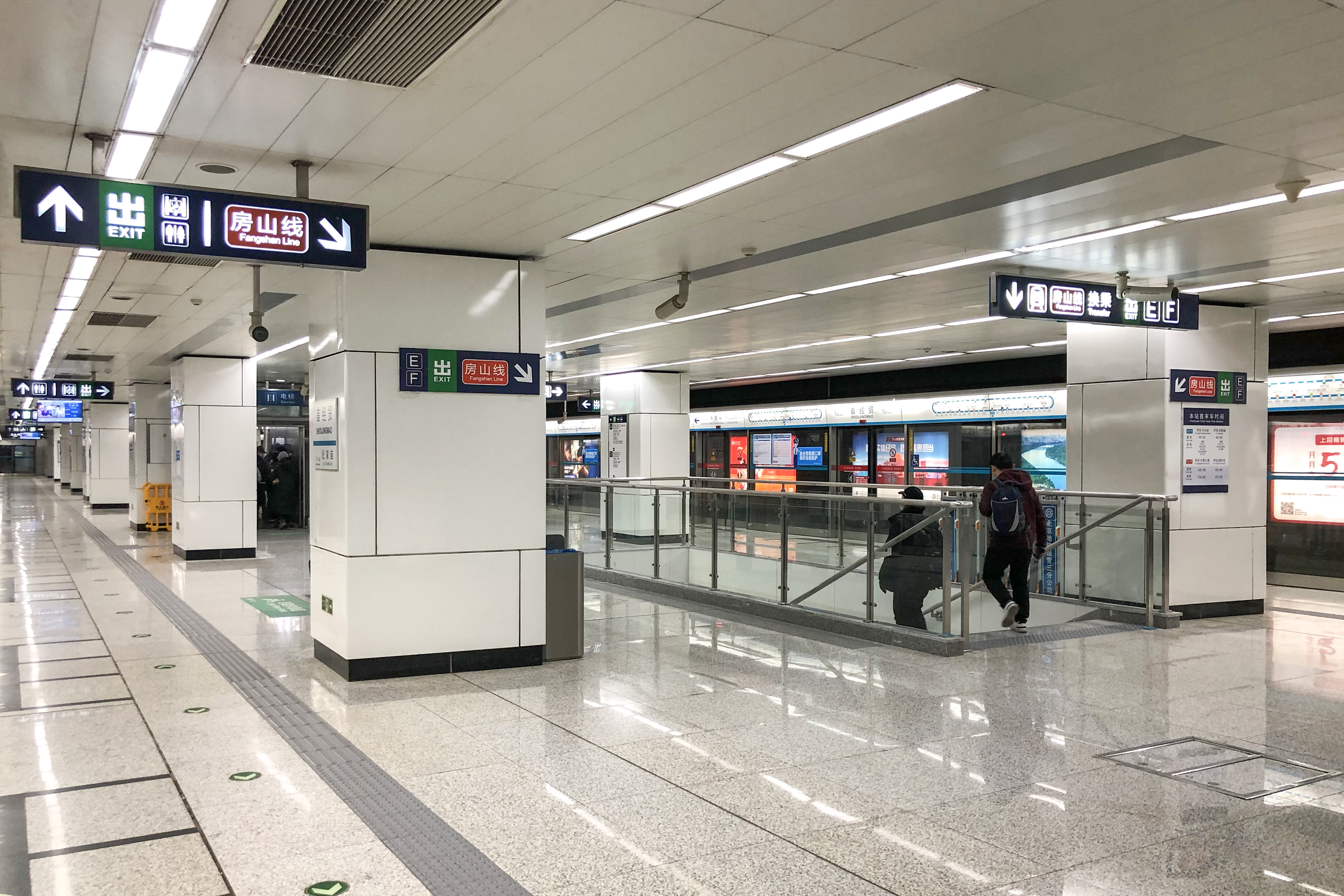
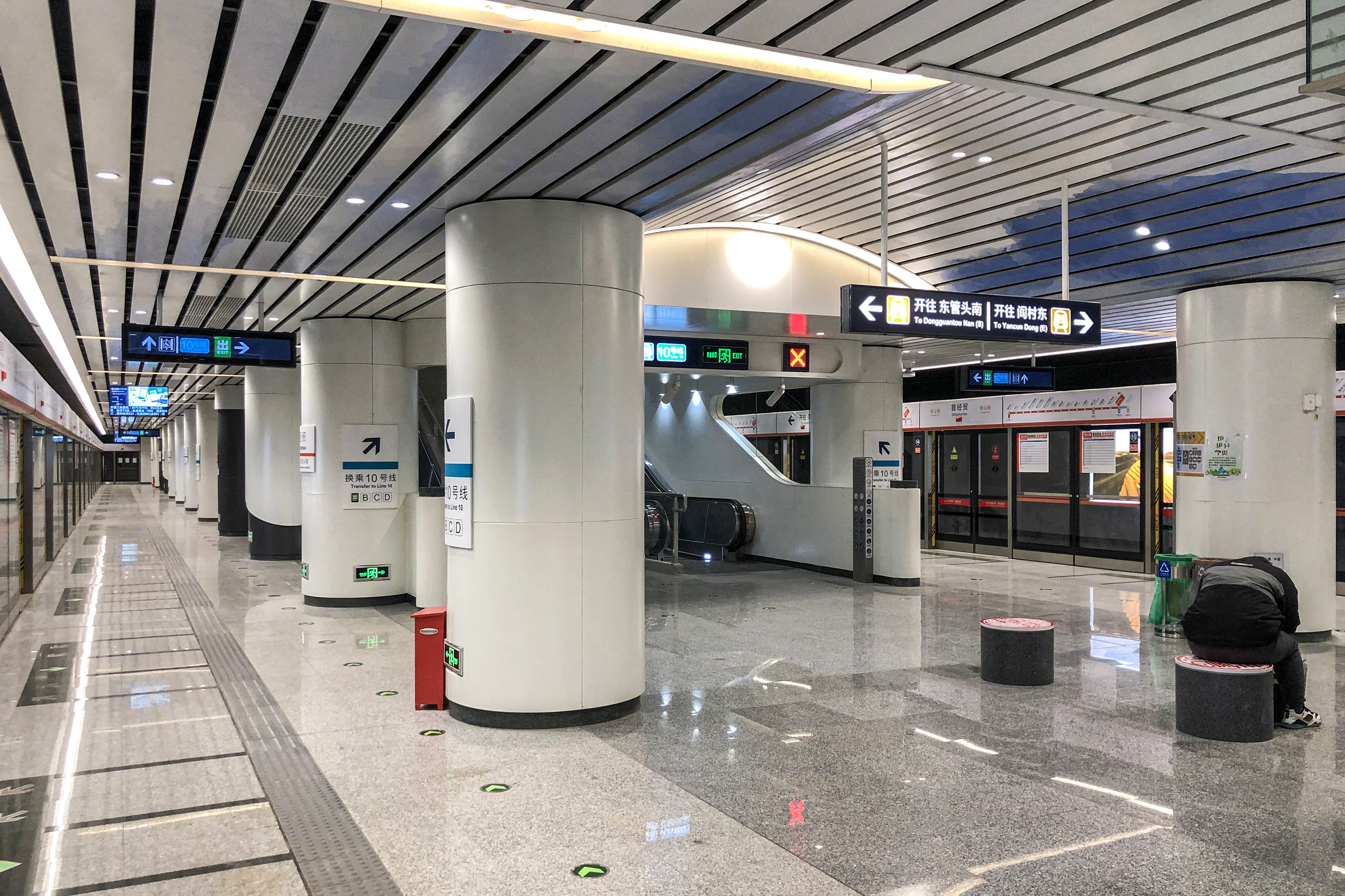
- Line 10 platform Fangshan line platform

General information
- Location: Shoujingmao North Road (首经贸北路) and Fangfei Road (芳菲路); Xincun Subdistrict, Fengtai District, Beijing; China
- Operator: Beijing Mass Transit Railway Operation Corporation Limited
- Lines: Line 10; Fangshan line
- Platforms: 4 (2 island platforms)
- Tracks: 4

Construction
- Structure type: Underground
- Accessible: Yes

History
- Opened: December 30, 2012; 13 years ago (Line 10); December 31, 2020; 5 years ago (Fangshan line)
- Former names: Fanjiacun (樊家村) (construction name)

Services
Preceding station	Beijing Subway	Following station
Jijiamiao outer loop / anticlockwise	Line 10	Fengtai railway station inner loop / clockwise
Dongguantounan Terminus	Fangshan line	Huaxiang Dongqiao towards Yancundong
Location
- Location within Beijing

Capital Univ. of Economics & Business station (simplified Chinese: 首经贸站; traditional Chinese: 首經貿站; pinyin: Shǒujīngmào zhàn) is an interchange station on Line 10 and Fangshan Line of the Beijing Subway in Beijing. The station opened on December 30, 2012, and is named after the Fengtai campus of the Capital University of Economics and Business.

== Station layout ==
The line 10 and Fangshan line stations have underground island platforms.

== Exits ==
There are 5 exits, lettered B, C, D, E, and F.. Exits B and D are accessible.

== Gallery ==
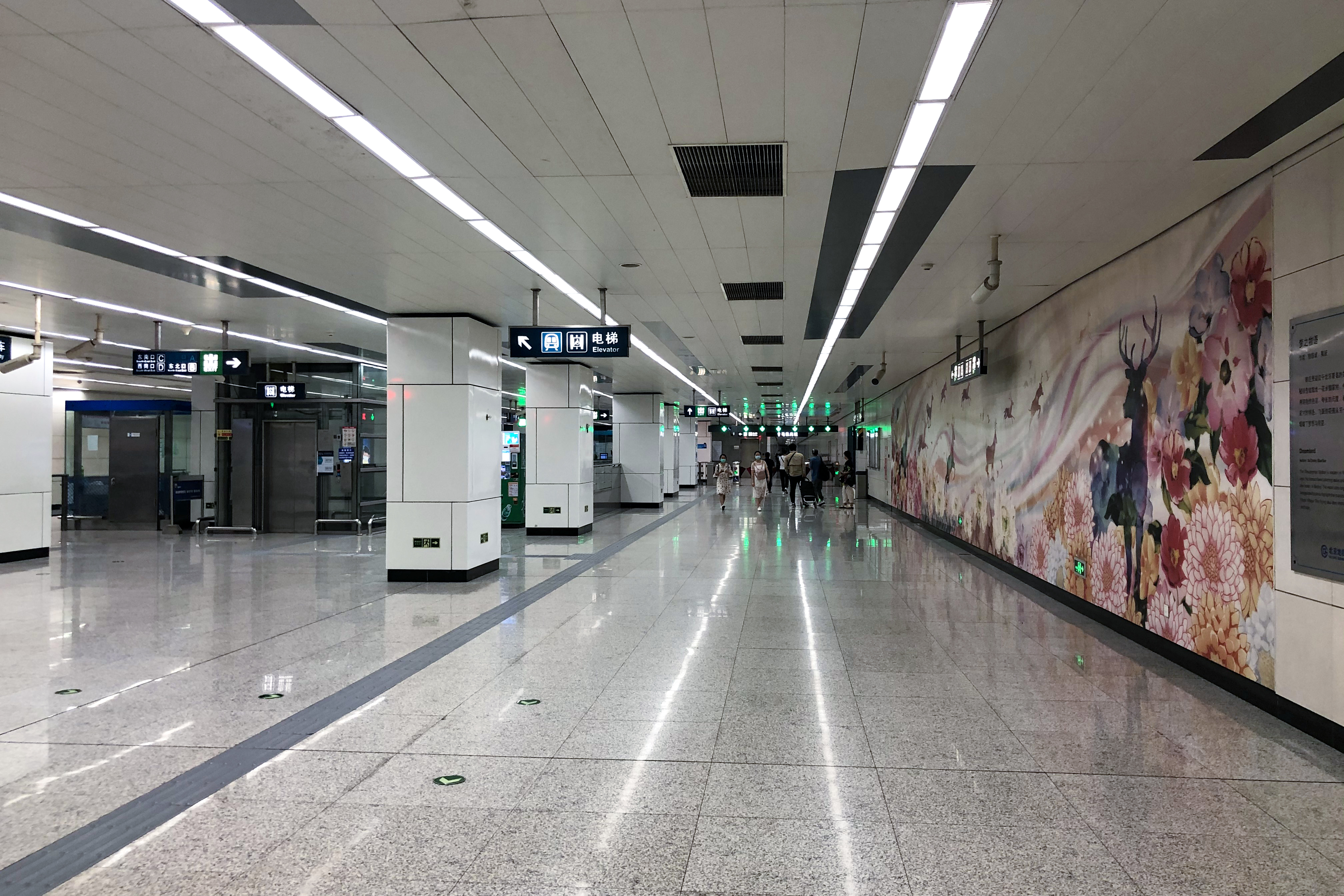
Line 10 concourse

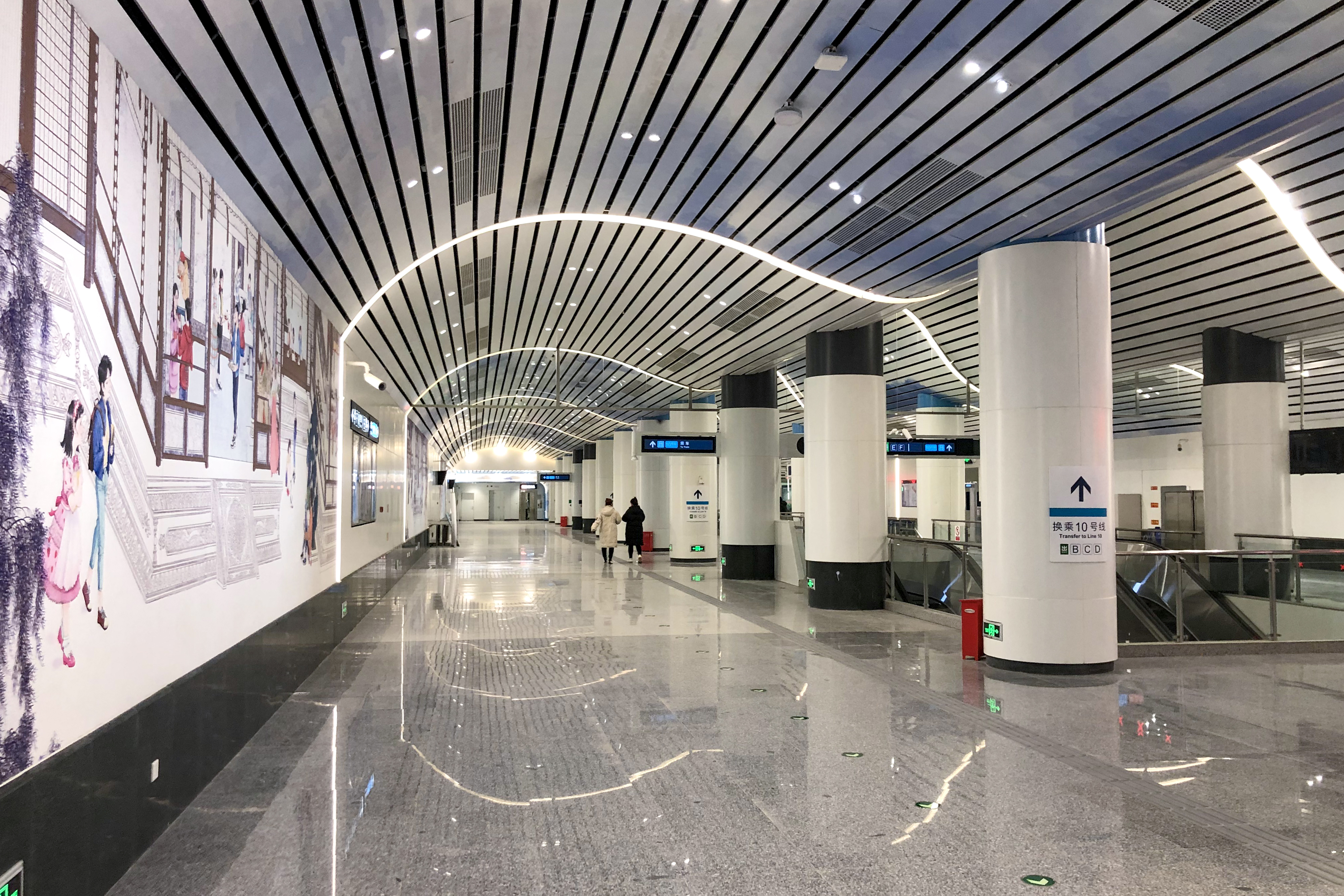
Fangshan Line concourse [1]

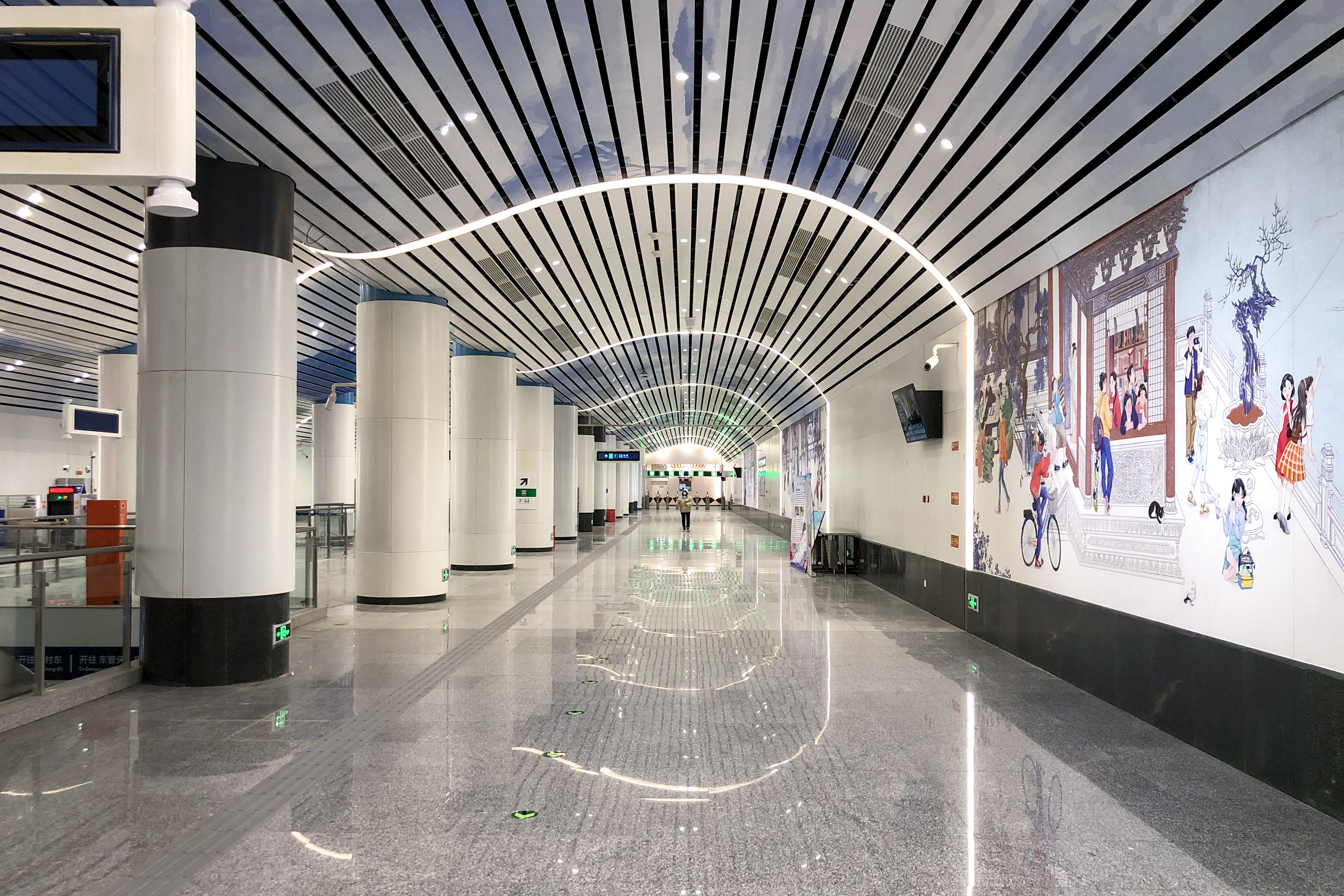
Fangshan Line concourse [2]
