= Jijiamiao station =

Beijing Subway station

Coordinates: 39°50′40″N 116°20′00″E

Jijiamiao 纪家庙
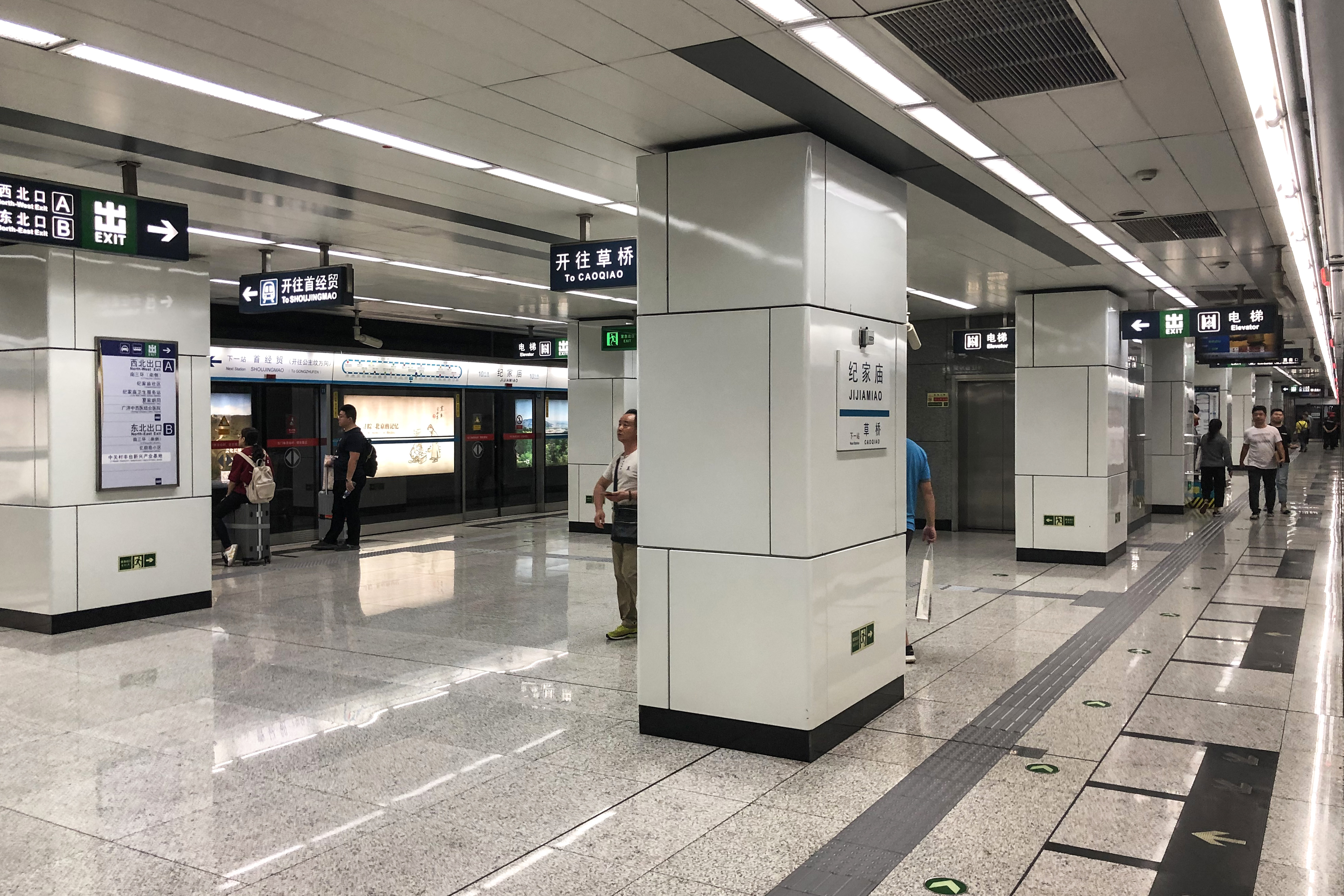

General information
- Other names: Yuquanying (玉泉营)
- Location: Intersection of Jingkai West Road (京开西路), Liucun Road (柳村路) and Jijiamiao Subway East Road (纪家庙地铁东路), Xincun Subdistrict, Fengtai District, Beijing; China
- Operator: Beijing Mass Transit Railway Operation Corporation Limited
- Line: Line 10
- Platforms: 2 (1 island platform)
- Tracks: 2

Construction
- Structure type: Underground
- Accessible: Yes

History
- Opened: December 30, 2012

Services
| Preceding station | Beijing Subway | Following station |
|---|---|---|
| Caoqiao outer loop / anticlockwise | Line 10 | Capital Univ. of Economics & Business inner loop / clockwise |
Location
- Location within Beijing

Jijiamiao station (simplified Chinese: 纪家庙站; traditional Chinese: 紀家廟站; pinyin: Jìjiāmiào zhàn) is a station on Line 10 of the Beijing Subway. This station opened on December 30, 2012.

== Station layout ==
The station has an underground island platform.

== Exits ==
There are 3 exits, lettered A, B, and D. Exit B is accessible.
