= Suzhuang station =

Beijing Subway station

Suzhuang 苏庄
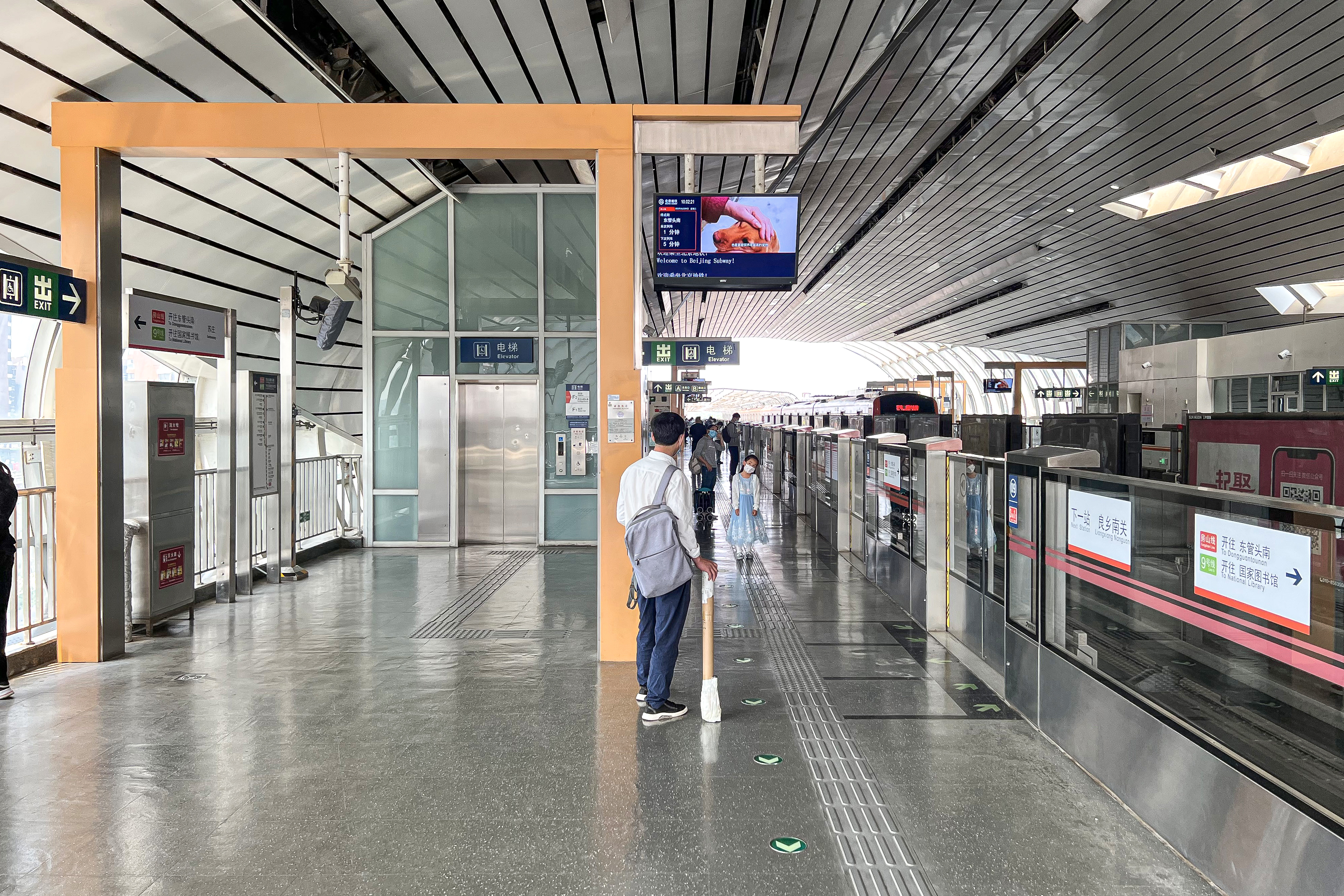
- Platform

General information
- Location: West Changhong Road (长虹西路); Fangshan District, Beijing; China
- Coordinates: 39°43′23″N 116°07′31″E
- Operator: Beijing Mass Transit Railway Operation Corporation Limited
- Line: Fangshan line
- Platforms: 2 (2 side platforms)
- Tracks: 2

Construction
- Structure type: Elevated
- Accessible: Yes

History
- Opened: December 30, 2010

Services
Preceding station	Beijing Subway	Following station
Liangxiang Nanguan towards Dongguantounan	Fangshan line	Yancundong towards Yancundong
Location
- Location within Beijing

Suzhuang station (simplified Chinese: 苏庄站; traditional Chinese: 蘇莊站; pinyin: Sūzhuāng Zhàn) is a station on Fangshan Line of the Beijing Subway.

== Station layout ==
The station has 2 elevated side platforms.

== Exits ==
There are 3 exits, lettered A1, A2, and B. Exits A2 and B are accessible.
