= Fangshan line =

Railway line in Beijing, China

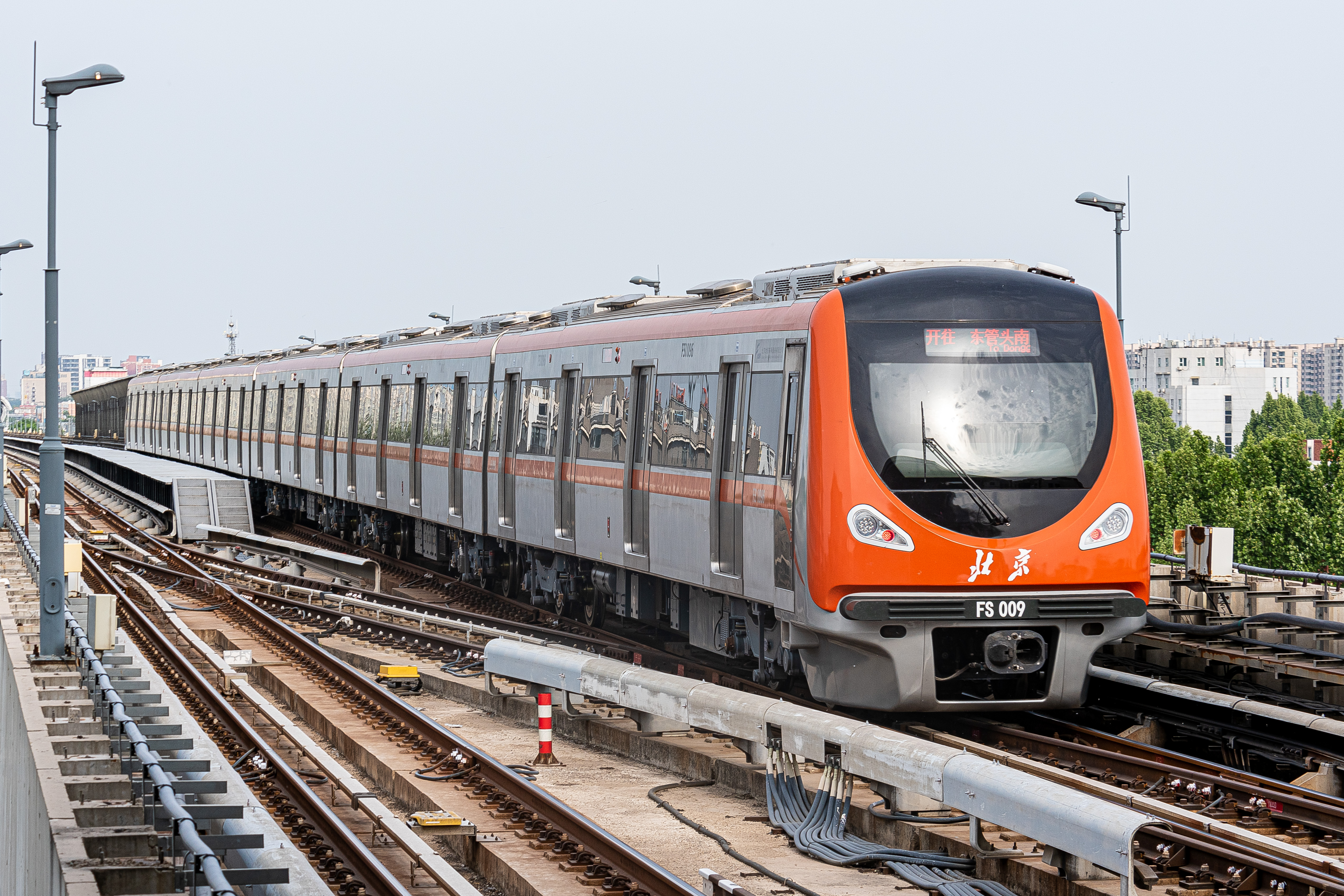
- A Fangshan line train leaving Suzhuang station

Overview
- Other name(s): M25 North (planned name); Line 25 North
- Native name: 房山线
- Status: Operational
- Locale: Fengtai and Fangshan districts Beijing
- Termini: Yancundong; Dongguantounan
- Stations: 16

Service
- Type: Rapid transit
- System: Beijing Subway
- Operator: Beijing Mass Transit Railway Operation Corporation Limited
- Depot: Yancun
- Rolling stock: 6-car Type B (BD24)
- Daily ridership: 102,600 (2014 Avg.); 132,100 (2014 Peak)

History
- Opened: 30 December 2010; 15 years ago

Technical
- Line length: 31.8 km (19.8 mi)
- Character: Underground and elevated
- Track gauge: 1,435 mm (4 ft 8 1/2 in)
- Electrification: 750 V DC third rail

The Fangshan line (Chinese: 房山线; pinyin: fángshān xiàn) of the Beijing Subway is a rapid transit line in western Beijing that runs from Yancundong in Fangshan District north and east to Dongguantounan in Fengtai District. The line is 31.8 km (19.8 mi). It is mainly elevated, including 10 elevated stations and 6 underground stations. It allows residents of Beijing's western suburbs to connect to the rest of the Beijing Subway network. Fangshan line's color is orange.

It was opened on December 30, 2010. An expansion of the line came on December 30, 2017, with the opening of the one-station western extension to Yancundong. The line was extended further north from Guogongzhuang station to the southwest corner of the Third Ring Road. The extension is 5.25 km (3.26 mi) in length and it is fully underground. The northern extension opened on December 31, 2020.

== Route ==
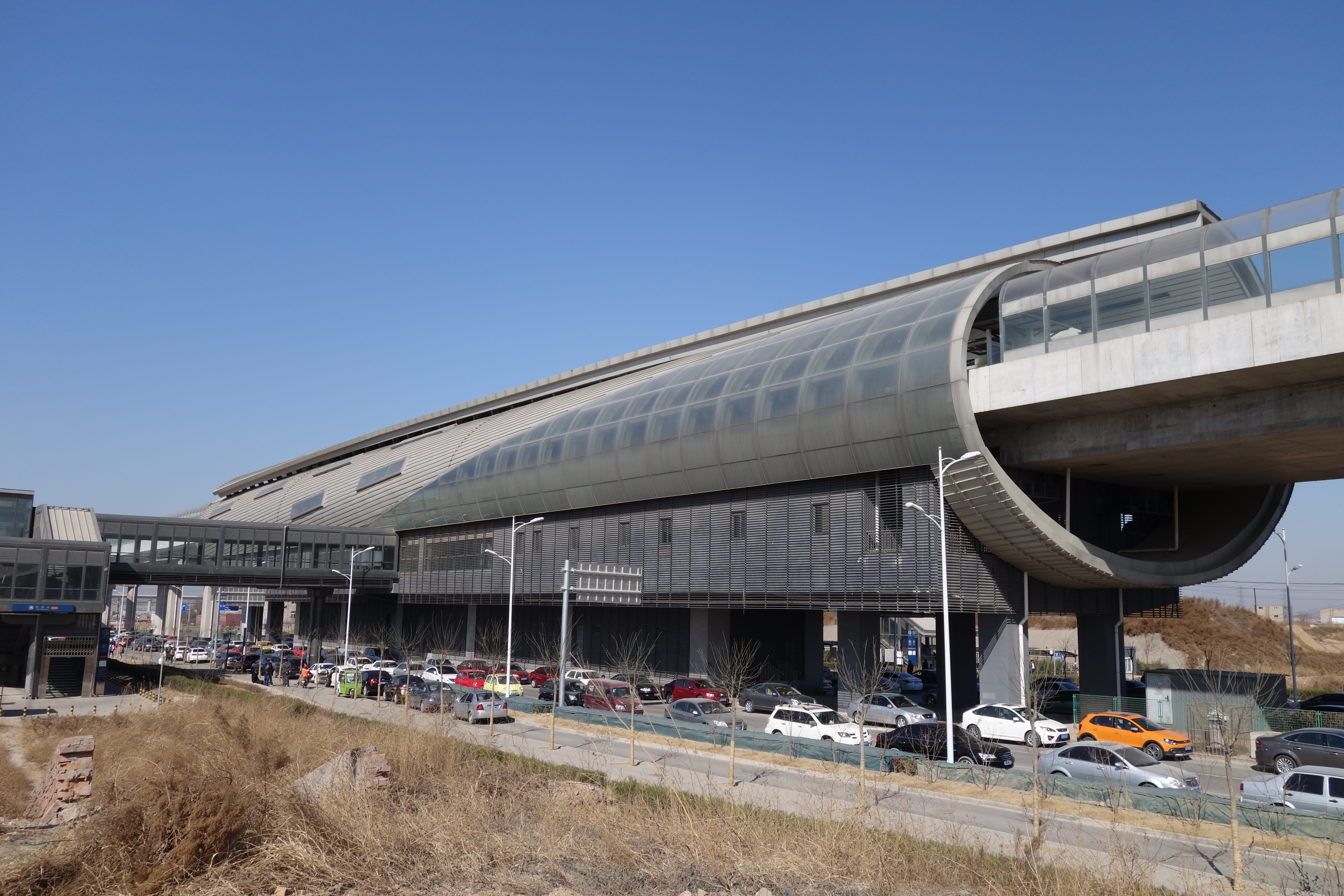
Daotian station on the Fangshan Line.

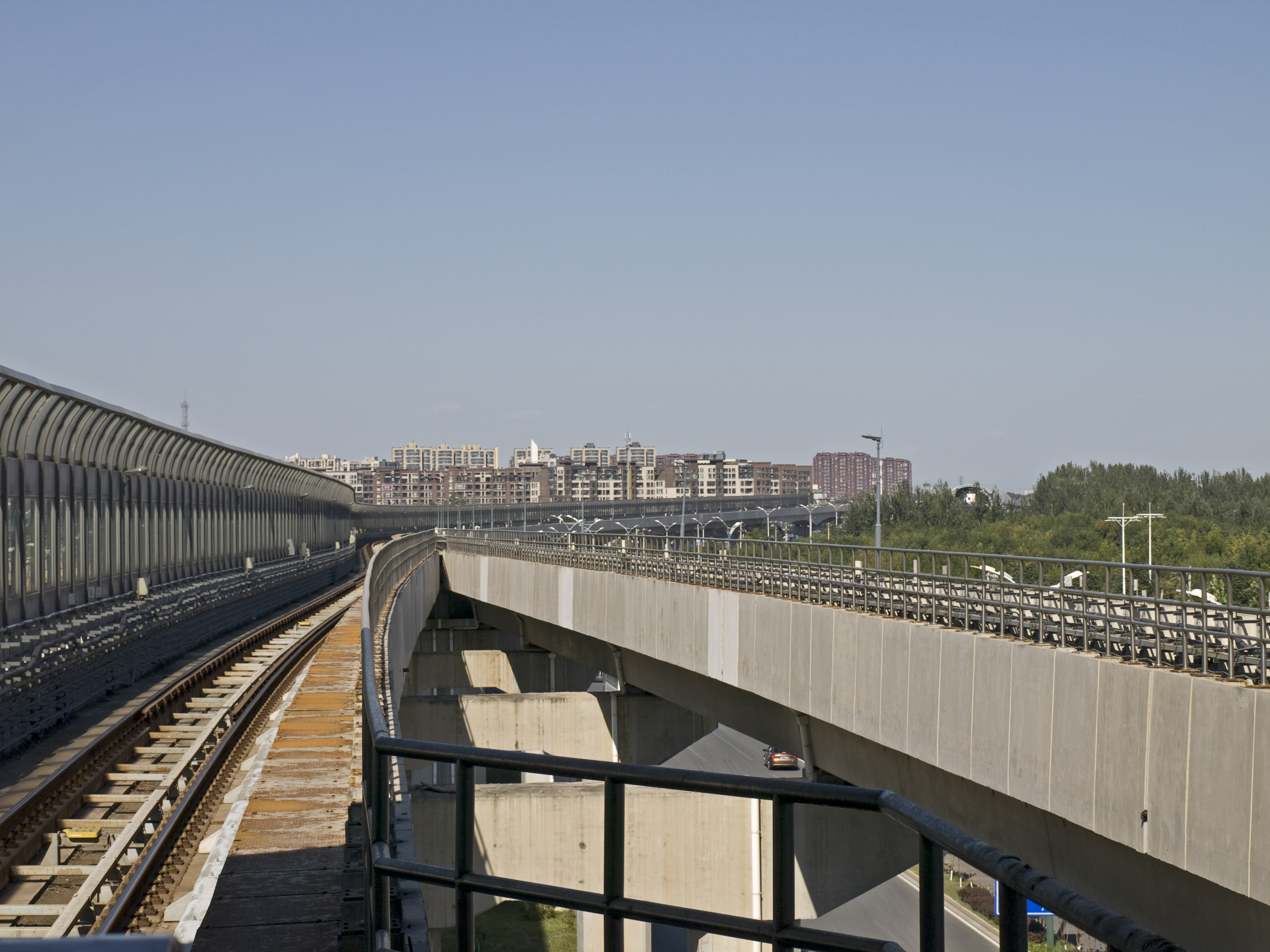
Tracks north of Guangyangcheng station

The Fangshan line starts at Yancundong, just west of the East Yancun Bridge, where it interchanges with the Yanfang line. Previously, it started at Suzhuang which is located at the intersection of Changhong West Road and Suzhuang Street in the Liangxiang area of Fangshan District. The line makes four stops in Liangxiang including at the Fangshan Campus of the Beijing Institute of Technology. The line then heads north to the towns of Guangyang and Changyang. After crossing the Yongding River, the Fangshan Line enters Fengtai District where the line makes two more stops, at Dabaotai near the Beijing World Park, and at Guogongzhuang, also the southern terminus of Line 9. The line then makes four stops further northeast connecting with Line 10 at Shoujingmao and connecting with Line 16 at Dongguantounan.

=== Stations ===
List of stations from northeast to southwest:

Station Name		Connections	Nearby Bus Stops	Distance km		Location
English	Chinese	Connections	Nearby Bus Stops	Distance km		Location
Dongguantounan	东管头南	16	49 67 483 629 678 692 845 912 夜7 夜30	0.000	0.000	Fengtai
Capital Univ. of Economics & Business	首经贸	10	67 351 692 912 通医专线7 专180	1.138	1.138	Fengtai
Huaxiang Dongqiao	花乡东桥		90 353 354 400 400快 602 685 通医专线7 专209	1.793	2.931	Fengtai
Baipenyao	白盆窑		497 627 845 专180 专190	1.671	4.602	Fengtai
Guogongzhuang	郭公庄	9 (through service during weekday peak)	470 497 627 692 969 快速直达专线17 快速直达专线107 专83 专125 专180	1.386	5.988	Fengtai
Dabaotai	大葆台		480 840 912 967 快速直达专线10	1.438	7.426	Fengtai
Daotian	稻田		391 832 F53 F75	6.466	13.892	Fangshan
Changyang	长阳		646 832 912 993 F51 F75 F76 F83 F85 快速直达专线14 快速直达专线120 快速直达专线151 专93 专94	4.042	17.934	Fangshan
Libafang	篱笆房		646 912 951 993 F33 F34 F35 F51 F74 F76 F83 F91 F92 快速直达专线24 快速直达专线28 快速直达专线120 快速直达专线151 快速直达专线187	2.150	20.084	Fangshan
Guangyang Cheng	广阳城		832 F28 F34 F35 F51 F85 快速直达专线187	1.474	21.558	Fangshan
Liangxiang Univ. Town North	良乡大学城北		832 F1 F12 F46	2.003	23.561	Fangshan
Liangxiang Univ. Town	良乡大学城		832 934 953 F1 F34	1.188	24.749	Fangshan
Liangxiang Univ. Town West	良乡大学城西		895 F1 F34 F86区 快速直达专线13	1.739	26.488	Fangshan
Liangxiang Nanguan	良乡南关		833 895 896 903 F1 F27 F33 F34 F39 F43 F46 F48 F49 F68 F74 F76 F78 F85 F86 快速直达专线177	1.333	27.821	Fangshan
Suzhuang	苏庄		833 903 934 971 993 F1 F28 F35 F46 F61 F68 F69 F70 F76 F81 F83 F85 快速直达专线177	1.331	29.152	Fangshan
Yancundong	阎村东	Yanfang	F43 F48 F49 F50 F57 F69 F78	2.305	31.457	Fangshan

=== Through service ===
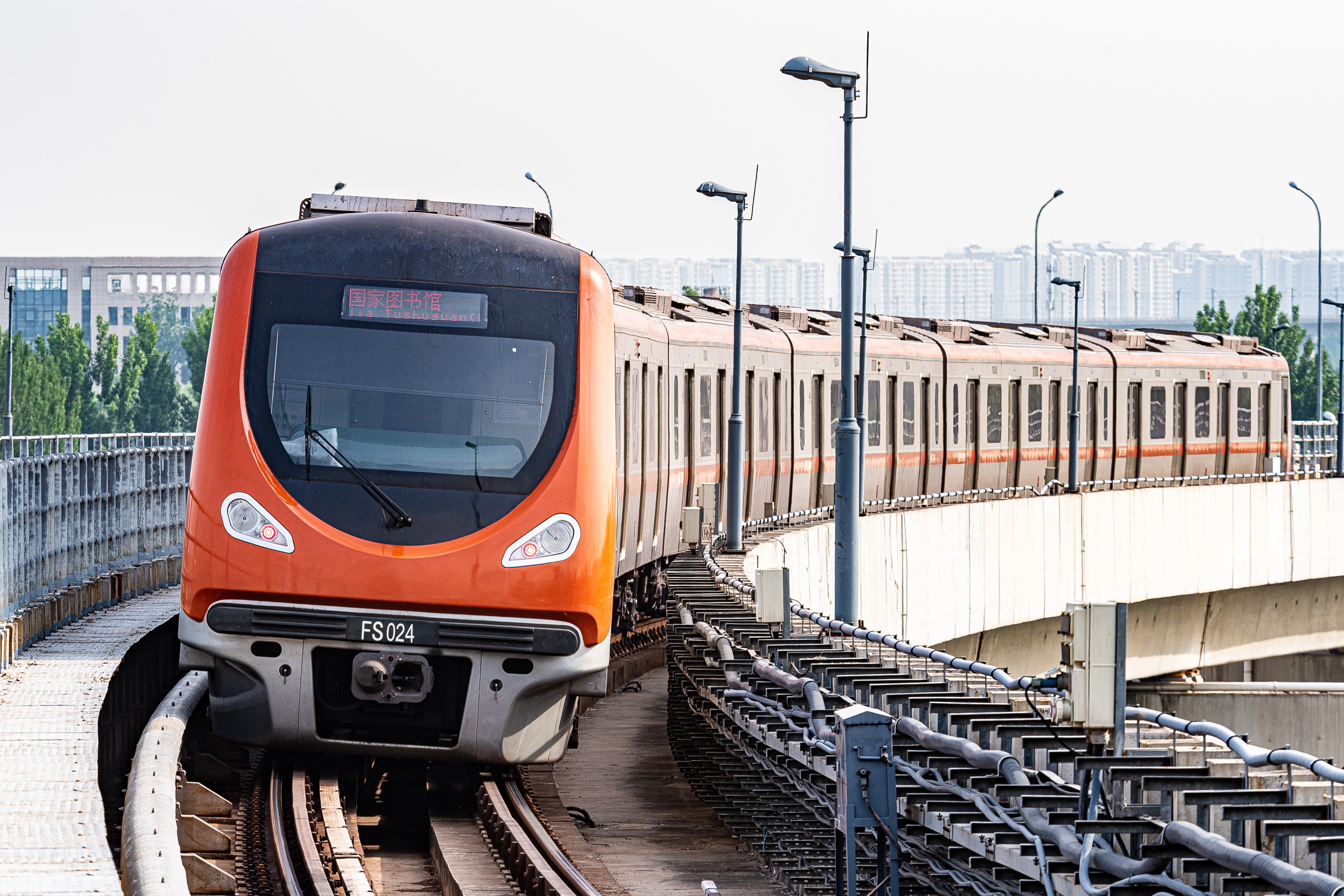
A northbound through train leaving Libafang station with terminus displayed as National Library.

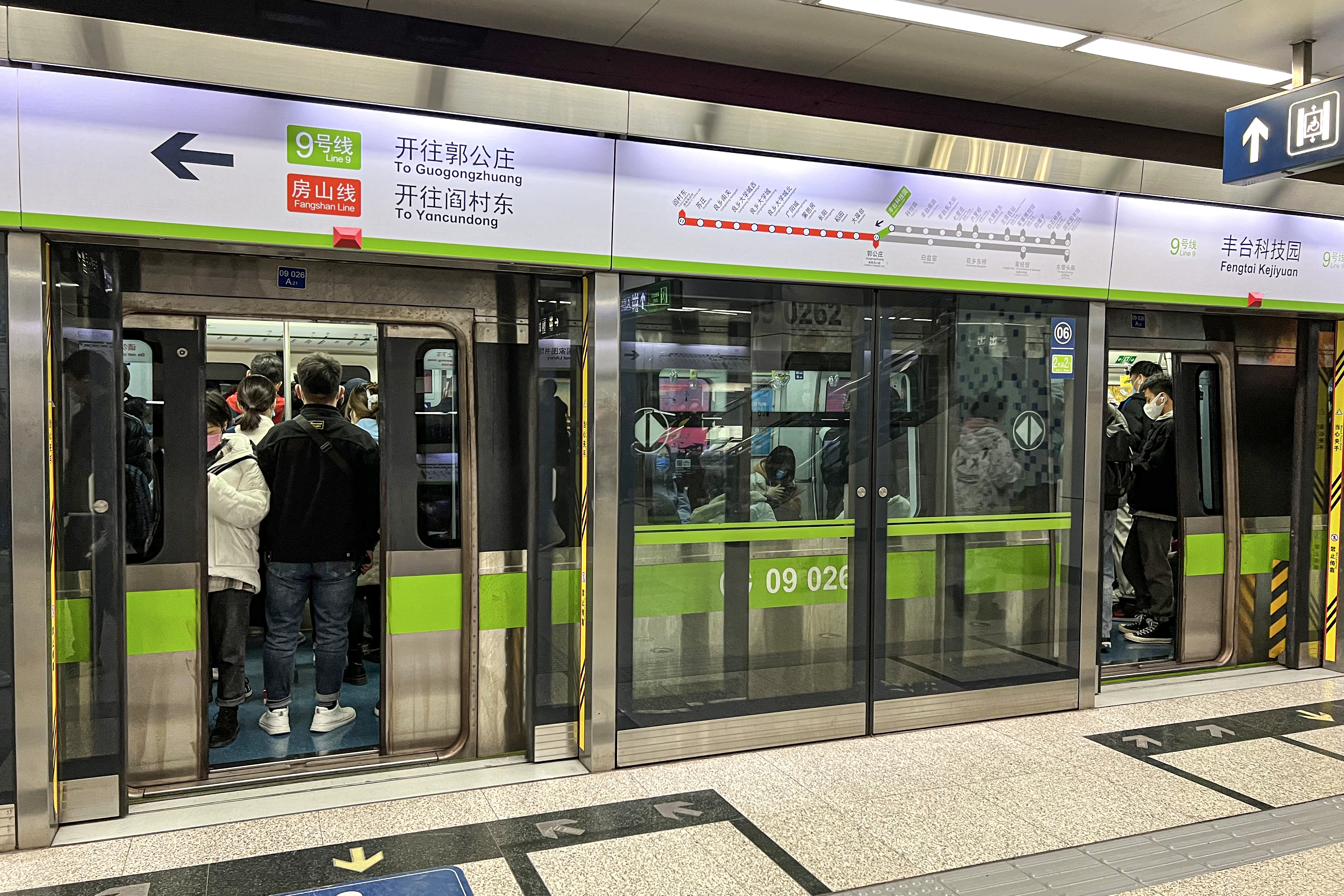
Route directory for through service between Line 9 and the Fangshan line.

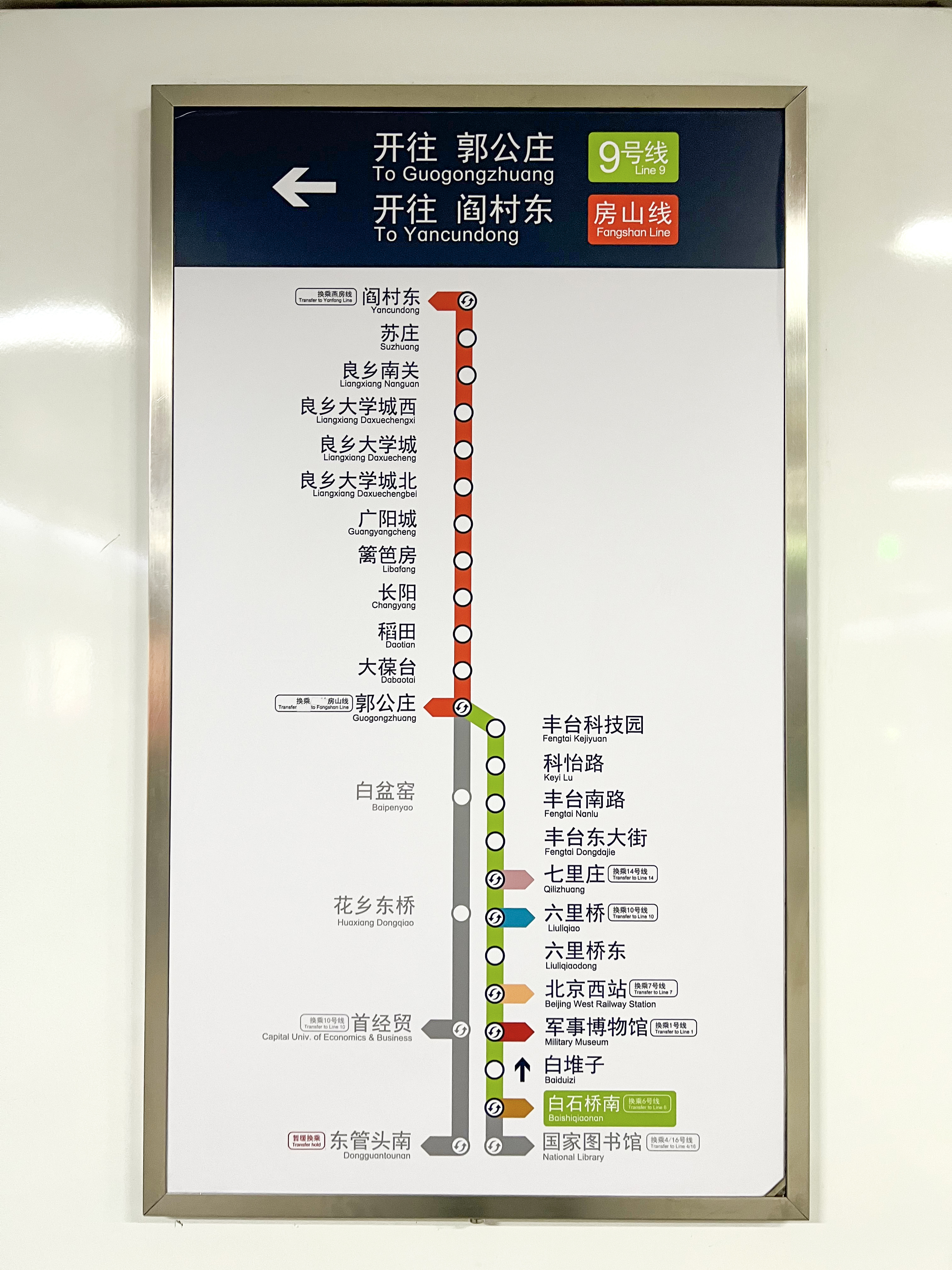
Route directory for through service between Line 9 and the Fangshan line.

In 2021, it was announced that there will be some through service between Line 9 and the Fangshan line. The operator is retrofitting the signal systems of both lines to achieve this. Through service started on 18 January 2023.

== Future Development ==
=== Phase 3 ===
The Phase 3 of the line, also known as Lijin line (丽金线), will add 10.9 km, with 8 stations. The extension start from Dongguantounan station on the Phase 2 of the Fangshan line and end at Lingjing Hutong station (interchange to Line 4). New interchange stations on this project includes Lize Shangwuqu station (interchange to Line 14, 16, Daxing Airport Express), Nanlishi Lu station (interchange to Line 1) and Lingjing Hutong station (interchange to Line 4). According to the information released in July 2022, the extension is included in the "Beijing Rail Transit Phase III Construction Plan".

== History ==
Construction of the Fangshan Line was originally set to begin in 2012 but was moved up to April 1, 2009, to use stimulus funding provided by the government to counter the 2008 financial crisis. The names of Phase 1 stations was announced on March 25, 2010, as a 7-day publicity.

On December 30, 2010, the line began operating from Suzhuang to Dabaotai, but was not connected to any other line of the subway system. One year later, on December 31, 2011, the Dabaotai to Guogongzhuang section opened, linking the Fangshan Line with Line 9 and the rest of the subway network.

On December 30, 2017, the line was extended one stop westward to Yancun Dong (E).

On December 31, 2020, the line was extended north by 4 stations.

Segment	Commencement	Length	Station(s)	Name
Dabaotai — Suzhuang	30 December 2010	24.79 km (15.4 mi)	10	Phase 1
Guogongzhuang — Dabaotai	31 December 2011	24.79 km (15.4 mi)	1	Phase 1
Suzhuang — Yancundong	30 December 2017	2.2 km (1.4 mi)	1	Western extension
Guogongzhuang — Dongguantounan	31 December 2020	4.8 km (3.0 mi)	4	Northern extension

== Rolling Stock ==
Model	Image	Manufacturer	Year built	Amount in service	Fleet numbers	Depot
BJD01 / BDK03		Beijing Subway Rolling Stock Equipment	2009; 2019–2020	44	FS 001–FS 044	Yancun
