= Liangxiang Nanguan station =

Beijing Subway station

Liangxiang Nanguan 良乡南关
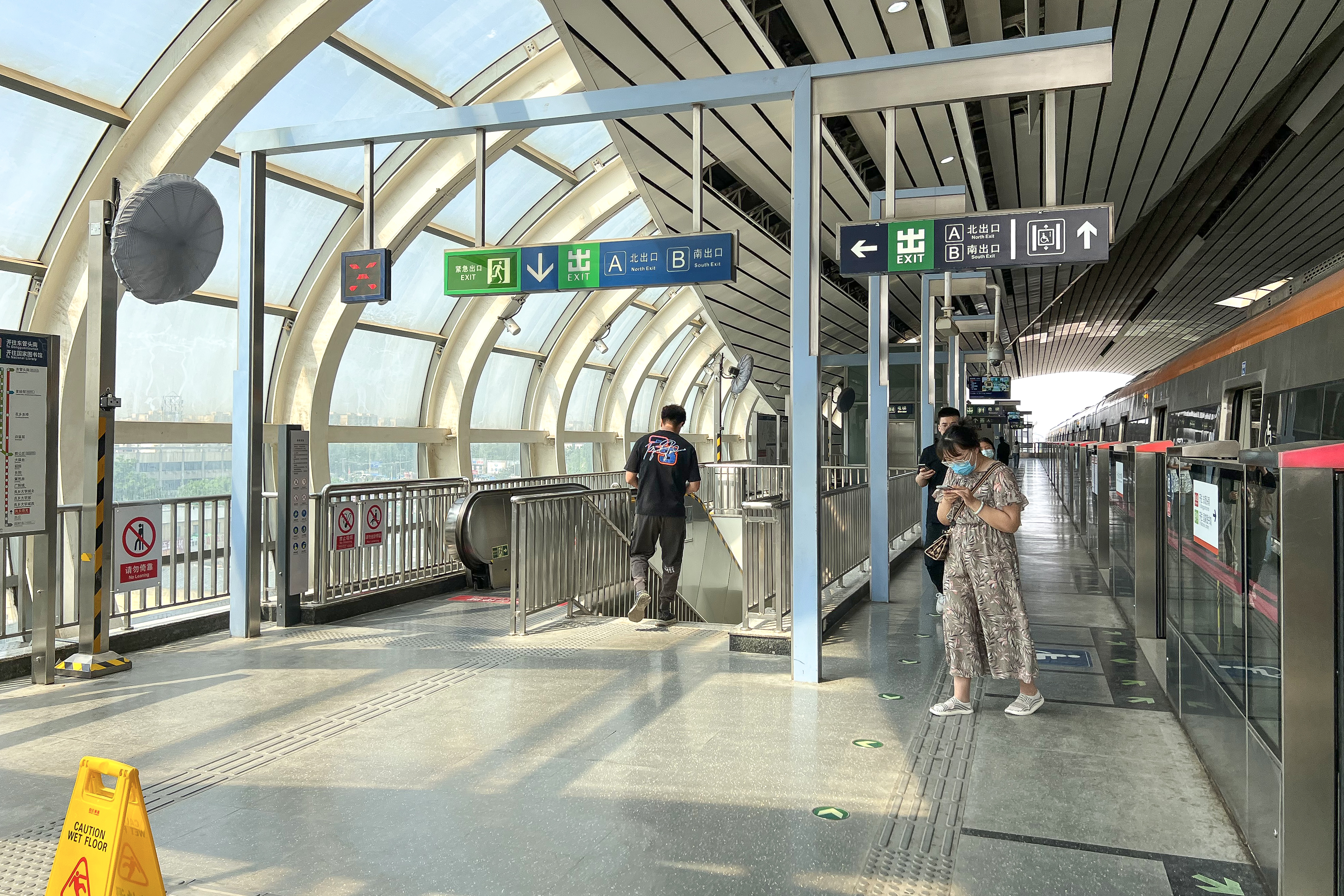
- Platform

General information
- Location: East Changhong Road (长虹东路) and Kaixuan Street (凯旋大街); Liangxiang, Fangshan District, Beijing; China
- Coordinates: 39°43′24″N 116°08′27″E
- Operator: Beijing Mass Transit Railway Operation Corporation Limited
- Line: Fangshan line
- Platforms: 2 (2 side platforms)
- Tracks: 2

Construction
- Structure type: Elevated
- Accessible: Yes

History
- Opened: December 30, 2010

Services
Preceding station	Beijing Subway	Following station
Liangxiang Univ. Town West towards Dongguantounan	Fangshan line	Suzhuang towards Yancundong
Location
- Location within Beijing

Liangxiang Nanguan station (simplified Chinese: 良乡南关站; traditional Chinese: 良鄉南關站; pinyin: Liángxiāng Nánguān Zhàn) is a station on Fangshan Line of the Beijing Subway.

== Station layout ==
The station has 2 elevated side platforms.

== Exits ==
There are 4 exits, lettered A1, A2, B1, and B2. Exits A1 and B1 are accessible.
