= Daotian station =

Beijing Subway station

Daotian 稻田
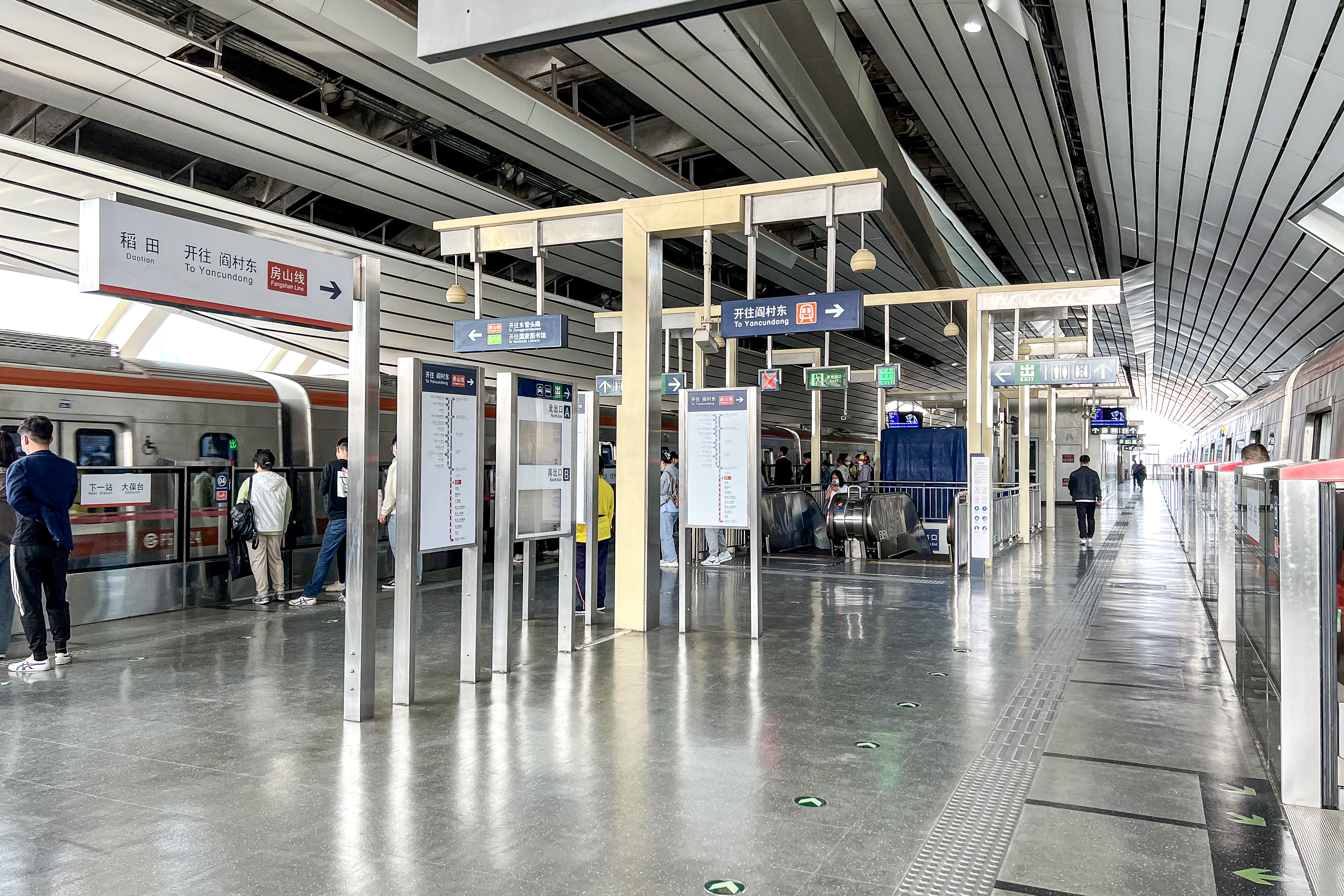
- Platform

General information
- Location: Duyisan Road (独义三路); Changyang, Fangshan District, Beijing; China
- Coordinates: 39°47′42″N 116°13′08″E
- Operator: Beijing Mass Transit Railway Operation Corporation Limited
- Line: Fangshan line
- Platforms: 2 (1 island platform)
- Tracks: 2

Construction
- Structure type: Elevated
- Accessible: Yes

History
- Opened: December 30, 2010

Services
Preceding station	Beijing Subway	Following station
Dabaotai towards Dongguantounan	Fangshan line	Changyang towards Yancundong
Location
- Location within Beijing

Daotian station (Chinese: 稻田站; pinyin: Dàotián Zhàn; lit. 'paddy field') is a station on Fangshan Line of the Beijing Subway.

== Station layout ==
The station has an elevated island platform.

== Exits ==
There are 4 exits, lettered A1, A2, B1, and B2. Exits A1 and B2 are accessible.
