= Changyang station =

Beijing Subway station

Changyang 长阳
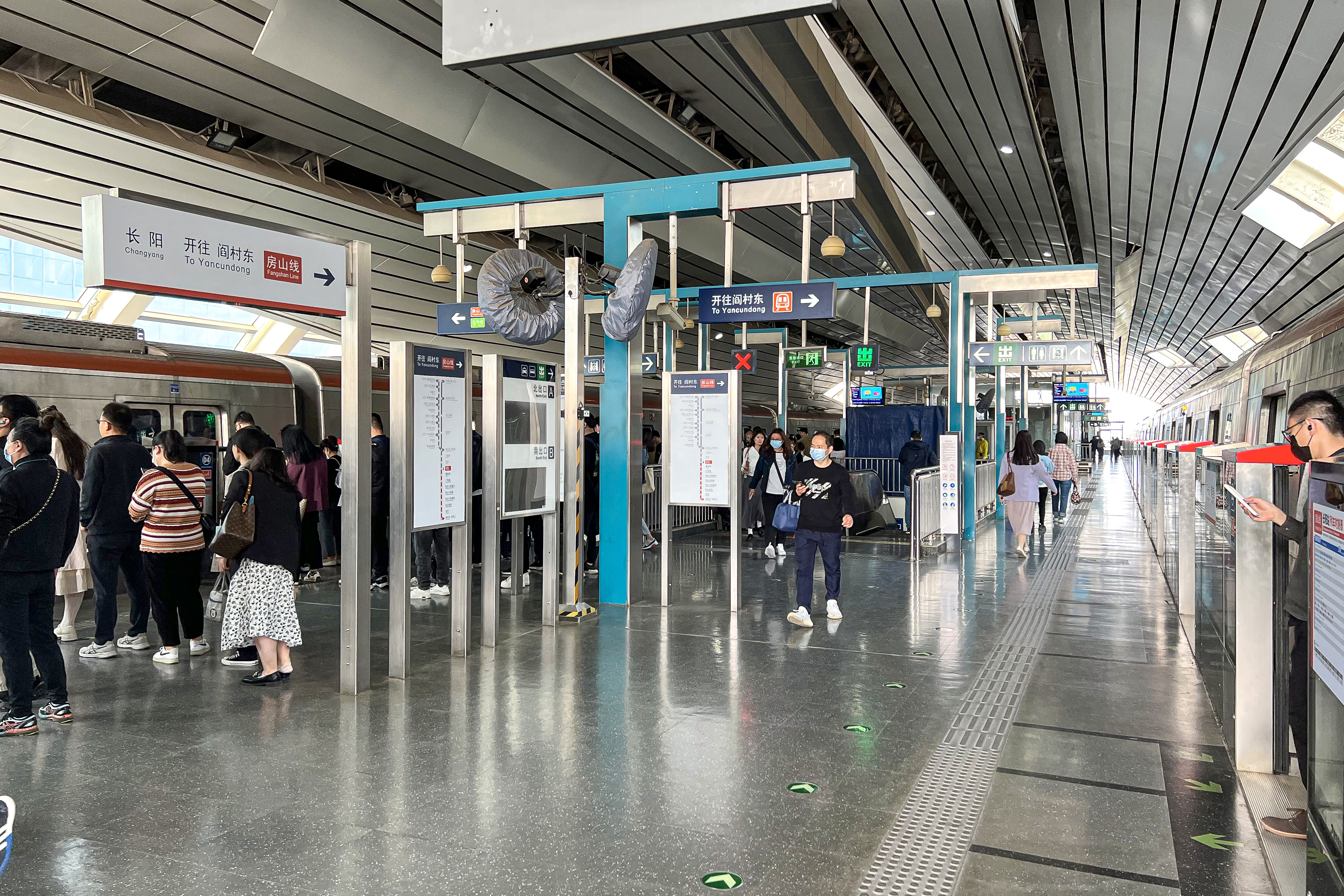
- Platform

General information
- Location: Jingliang Road (京良路); Changyang, Fangshan District, Beijing; China
- Coordinates: 39.763871°N 116.212692°E
- Operator: Beijing Mass Transit Railway Operation Corporation Limited
- Line: Fangshan line
- Platforms: 2 (1 island platform)
- Tracks: 2

Construction
- Structure type: Elevated
- Accessible: Yes

History
- Opened: December 30, 2010

Services
Preceding station	Beijing Subway	Following station
Daotian towards Dongguantounan	Fangshan line	Libafang towards Yancundong
Location
- Location within Beijing

Changyang station (simplified Chinese: 长阳站; traditional Chinese: 長陽站; pinyin: Chángyáng Zhàn) is a station on Fangshan Line of the Beijing Subway.

== Station layout ==
The station has an elevated island platform.

== Exits ==
The station has 2 exits, lettered A and B. Exit A is accessible.
