= Beijing World Park =

Theme park in Fengtai District, Beijing

Beijing World Park 北京世界公园
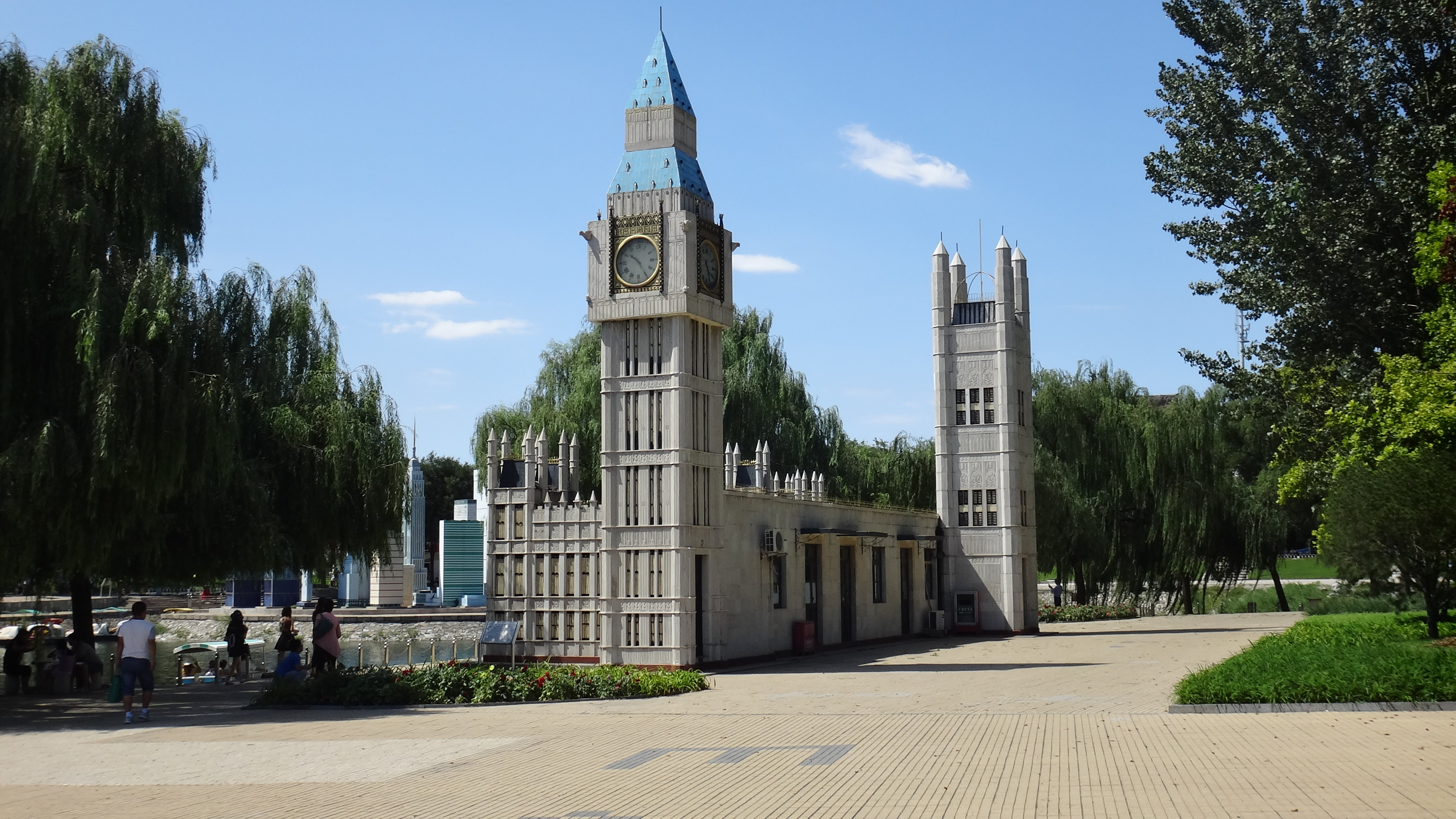
- Replica of Palace of Westminster in Beijing World Park
- Interactive map of Beijing World Park 北京世界公园
- Location: Beijing, China
- Coordinates: 39°48′34″N 116°16′53″E
- Opened: October 25, 1993
- Attendance: 1.5 million
- Area: 46.7 ha (115 acres)

Beijing World Park (simplified Chinese: 北京世界公园; traditional Chinese: 北京世界公園; pinyin: Běijīng Shìjiè Gōngyuán) is a theme park that attempts to give visitors the chance to see the world without having to leave Beijing. The park covers 46.7 hectares and is located in the southwestern Fengtai District of Beijing. It is about 17 km from Tiananmen, the City center, and 40 km from the Capital International Airport. The park opened in 1993 and is estimated to receive 1.5 million visitors annually.

== The park ==
The entrance to the park is made up of a Gothic castle, Roman corridor, and granite relief sculptures. Immediately inside the gate is an Italian-style terrace garden with grand staircases, fountains, and sculptures inspired by originals from the European Renaissance. More lawns and gardens are scattered throughout the park. On these lawns are miniature models of around 100 of the world's most famous statues including the American Statue of Liberty, Copenhagen's Little Mermaid, Michelangelo's David, and the Venus de Milo. Once inside the gates, Beijing World Park consists of two main parts: the scenic portion and the shopping, dining, and entertainment area.

=== Scenic area ===
The scenic area of the park models itself after the naturalistic layout of the globe, representing the four major oceans, and focusing on five continents: Asia, Africa, Europe, North America, and South America. The park contains about a hundred (109) scaled-down replicas of famous landmarks from nearly 40 countries and regions around the world, including the Tower Bridge in London, the Eiffel Tower in Paris, and the Great Pyramids in Egypt. There is even a miniature Manhattan, complete with twin towers of the World Trade Center. Each landmark represents its country or region of origin and is situated in the park according to its location on the map.

Close attention to detail was paid in modeling these landmarks after their originals. For example, detailed carvings and ornamentations are included. Even the materials used are modeled after their originals to create the most authentic look possible. For example, the replica of the Great Pyramids was constructed of 200,000 white marble bricks, each as large as a bar of soap. Red Square in Russia, is replicated by paving the smaller model in World Park with over 5 million red bricks smaller than mahjong tiles.

=== List of Some International Landmarks Featured in Beijing World Park ===
- Australia's Sydney Opera House
- Belgium's Atomium
- Belgium's Manneken Pis
- Egypt's Great Pyramids
- Egypt's Pharos of Alexandria
- Egypt's Great Sphinx
- France's Eiffel Tower
- France's Arc de Triomphe
- France's Notre Dame Cathedral
- India's Taj Mahal
- Italy's Leaning Tower of Pisa
- A Netherlands windmill
- The United Kingdom's Big Ben Clocktower
- The United Kingdom's Tower Bridge
- The United States' Manhattan with Empire State Building and World Trade Center
- The United States' Statue of Liberty

Many of the locale-specific areas focused on the five continents also include live entertainment or some kind of an immersive cultural experience such as a dance performance or parade based on customs from their culture of origin. There is a special garden area in the scenic portion of the park that consists of China's Qingyingjing Park, Japan's Katsura Imperial Villa, and an American-style garden villa. This allows visitors to see global styles of gardening. To get around the park, visitors can travel the four "oceans" by speedboat tour. They can also take a monorail that circumvents the five continents to give tourists a glimpse of the whole "world". Or they can take a tour of the park in battery-operated cars.

=== Shopping, dining, and entertainment area ===
The other portion of the park includes the shopping and dining area. This area is modeled after Euro-American architecture. The various establishments allow visitors to purchase souvenirs and sample cuisine from the countries and regions represented in the scenic portion of the park. This second part of the park also includes the entertainment area where grand spectacles and cinema features take place in large theatres to showcase global cultural costume, movement, and customs. Some of these cultural activities include the daily opening ceremonies, which consist of a parade of large-scale floats. There are also culture-specific folklore dances that take place indoors or in open-air arenas. These dances may be performed by Beijing World Park dancers, or they may be performed by troupes representing their local cultures. In 2005 the park even hosted a Thai elephant that performed four times a day from May to October.

== The 2008 Summer Olympics ==
During the 2008 Summer Olympics, it was selected as one of the three protest zones.

== The World ==
The World is a 2004 film directed by Jia Zhangke, which was made at Beijing World Park and focused on the lives of some fictional park employees.

== Nearby attractions ==
The Beijing Dabaotai Western Han Dynasty Mausoleum is located 0.5 km (0.31 mi) southeast from the south entrance of the World Park. The mausoleum hosts the 2,000-year-old tombs of a Western Han dynasty prince and his wife.

== Transport ==
- Dabaotai station

== Gallery ==
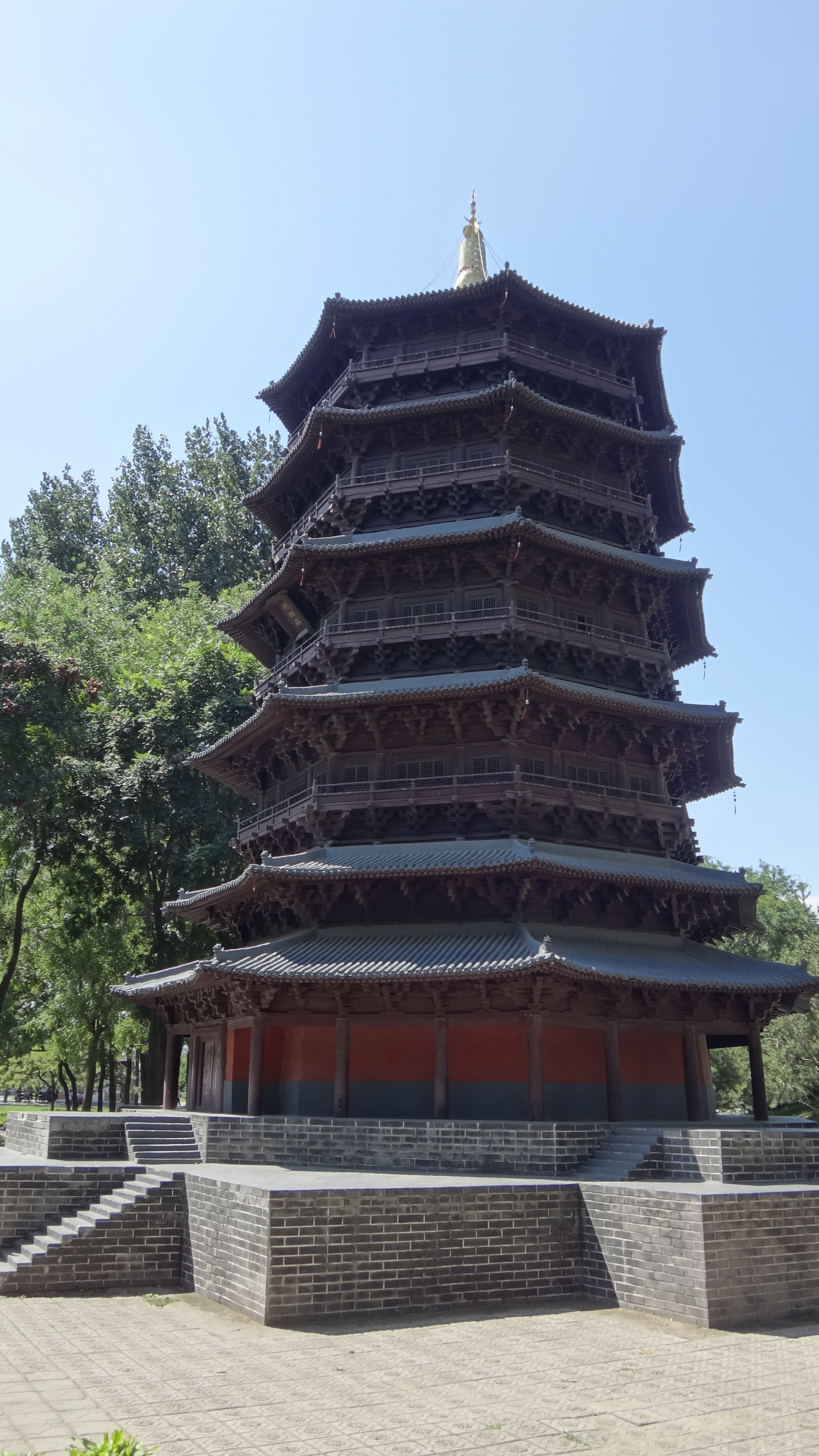
Yingxian Wooden Pagoda

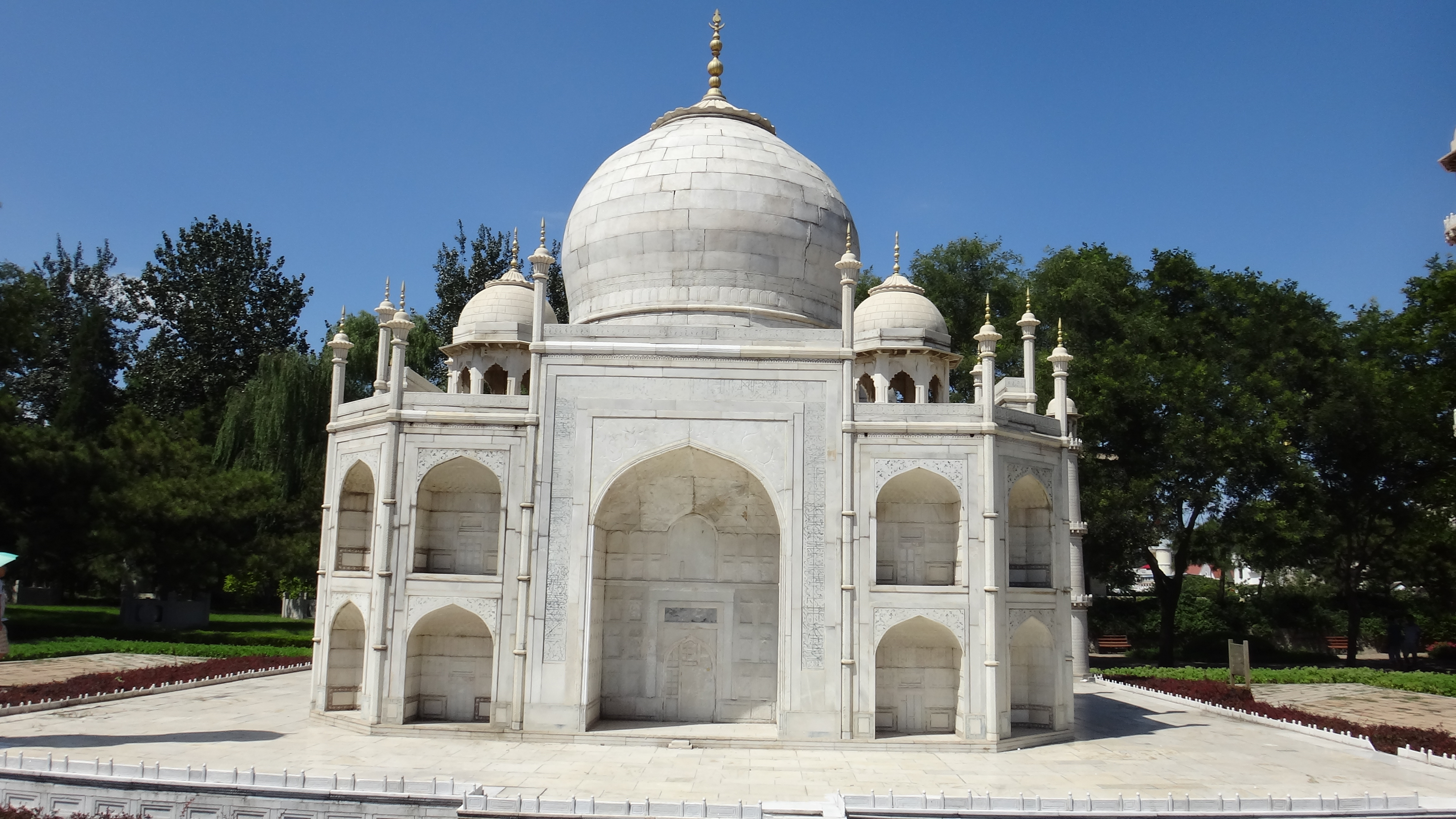
Taj Mahal

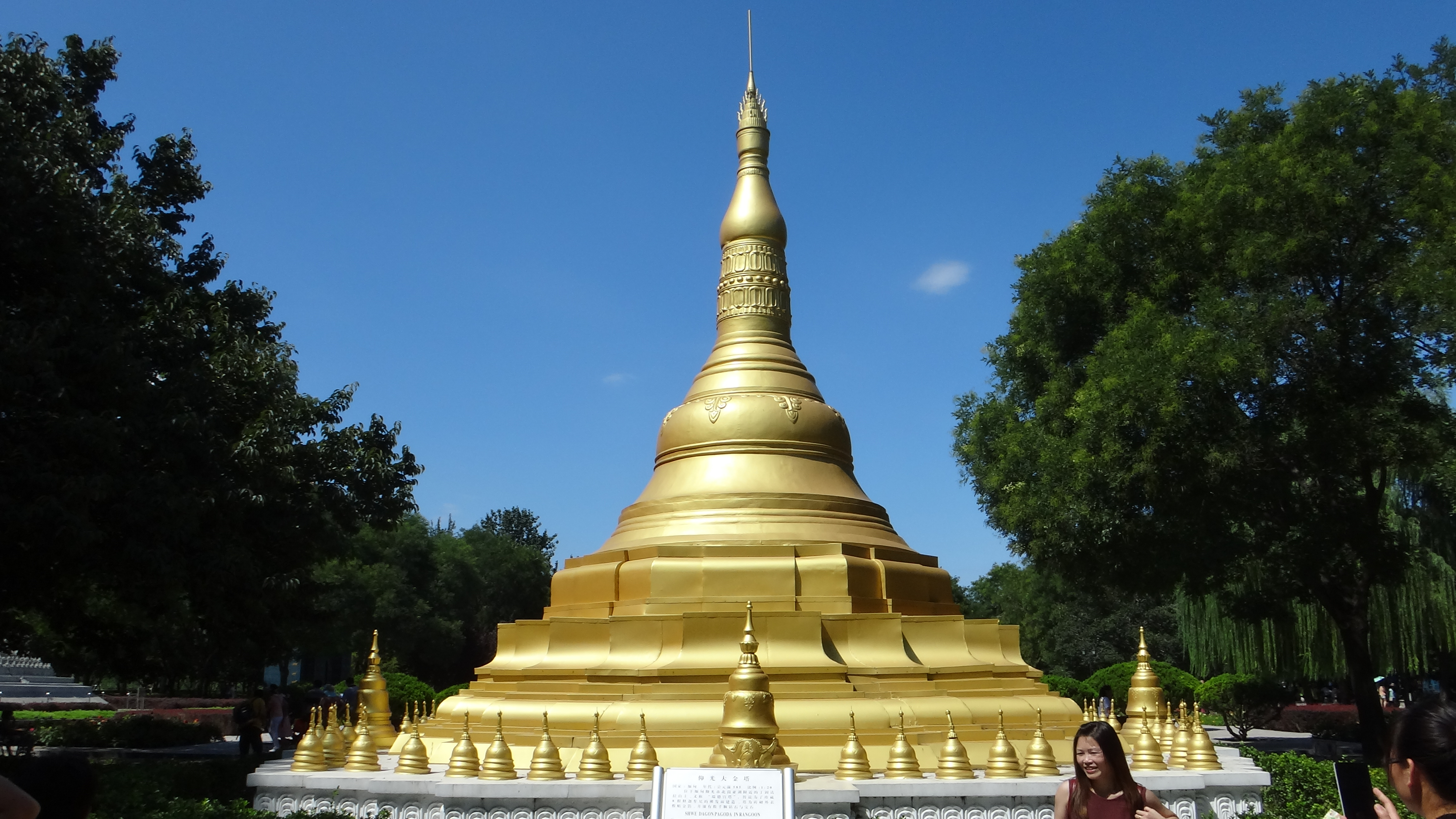
Shwedagon Pagoda

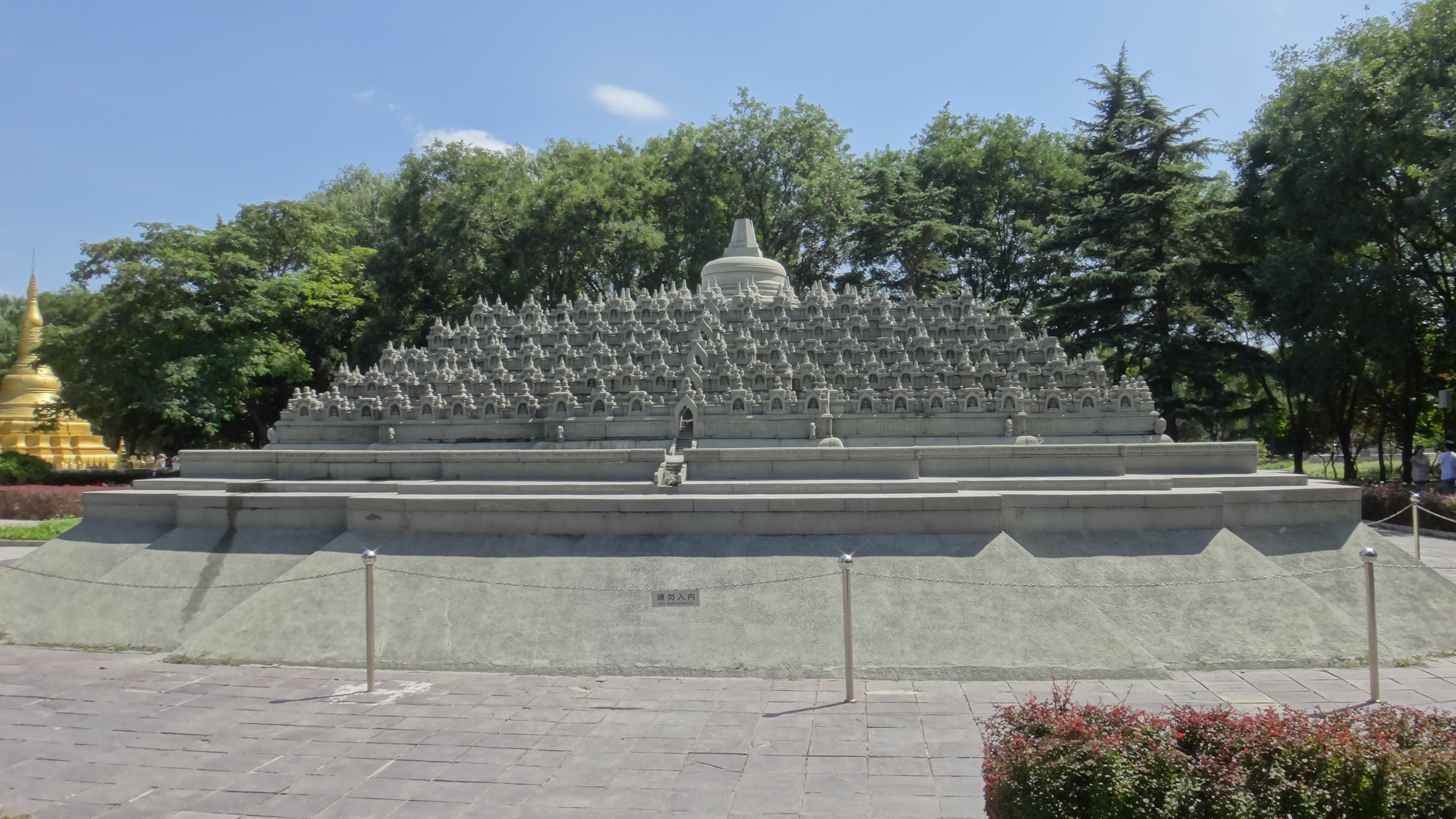
Borobudur

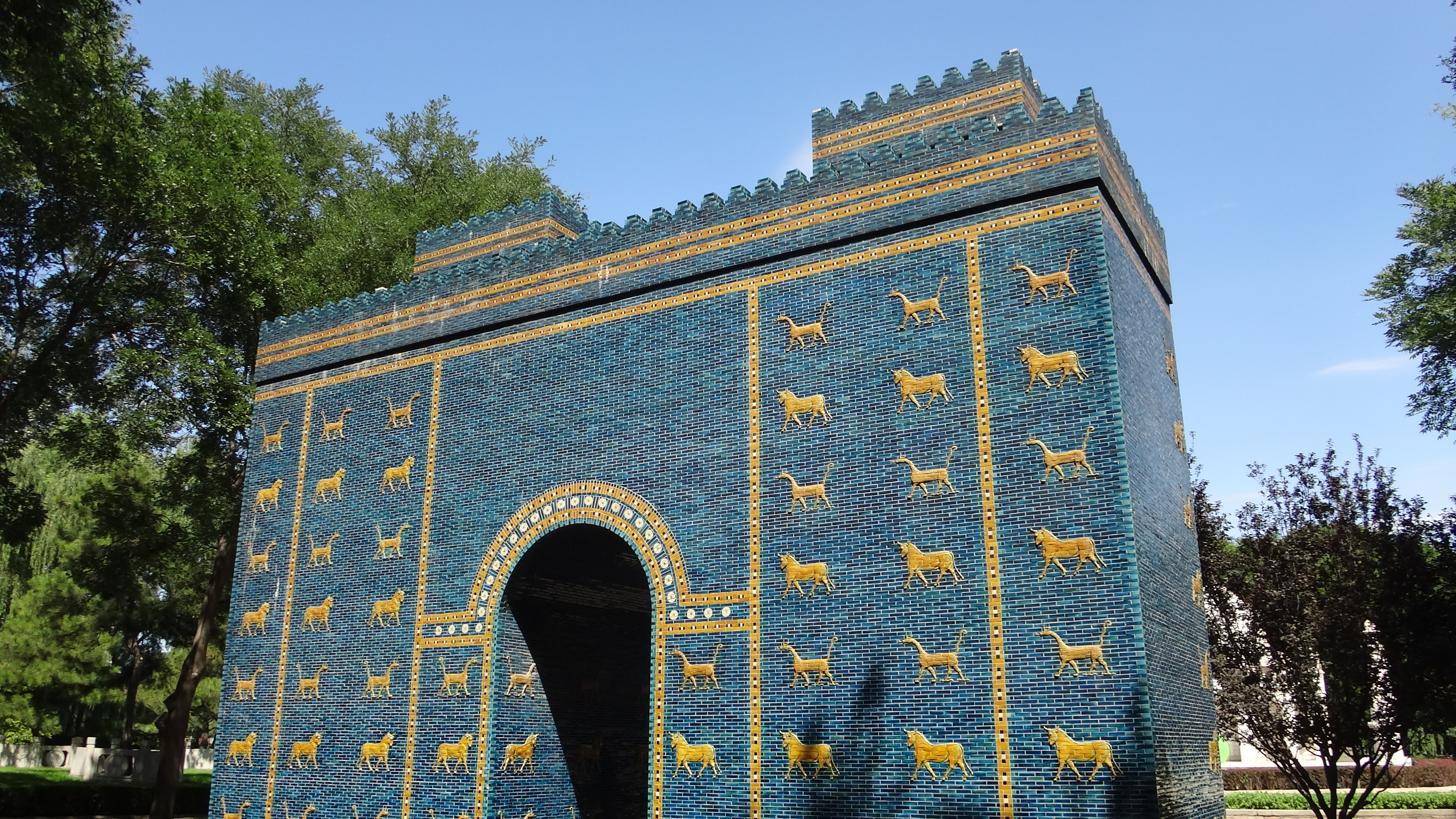
Ishtar Gate

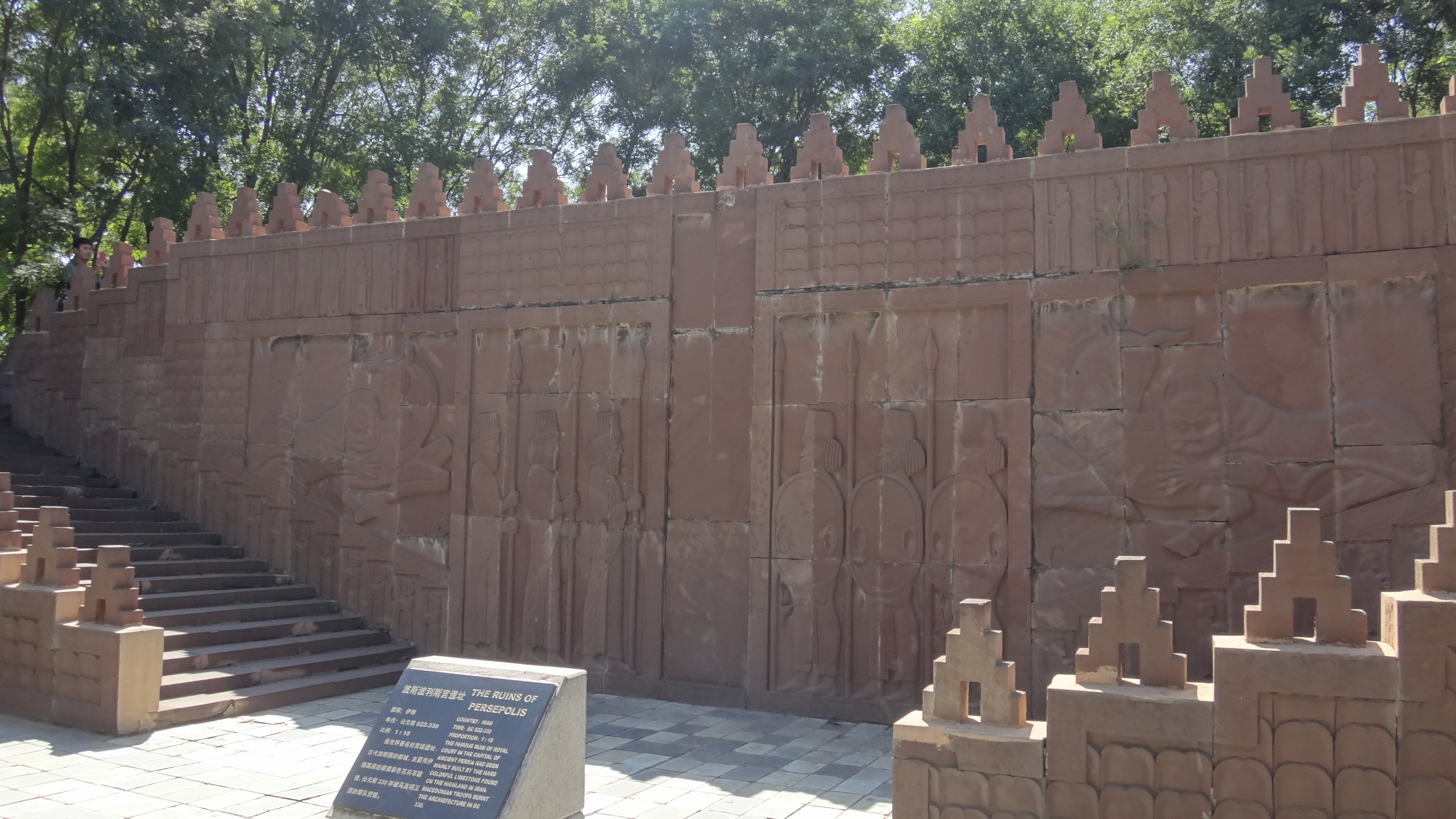
Ruins of Persepolis Palace

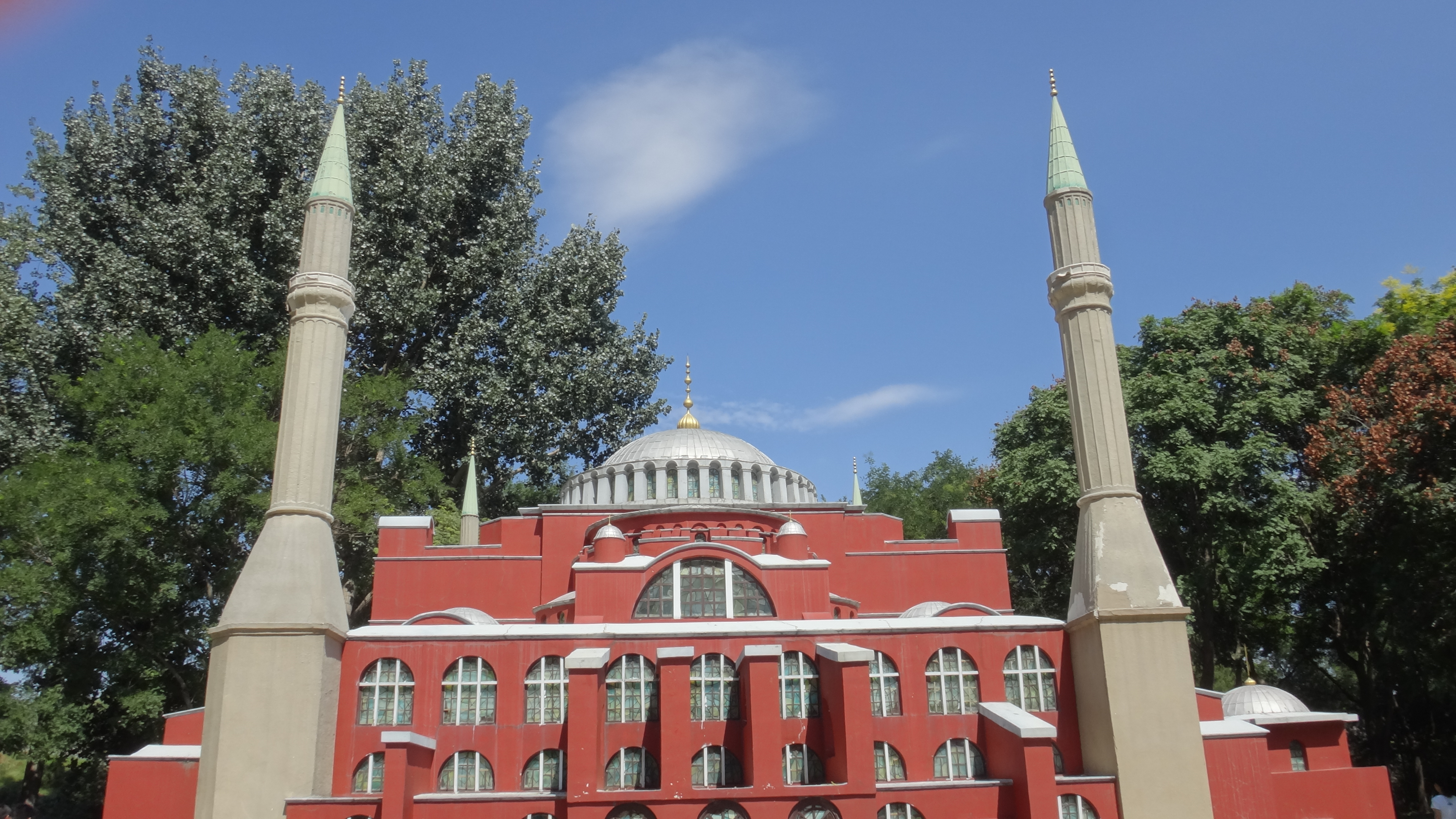
Hagia Sophia

== See also ==
- Window of the World - a similar but older park located in Shenzhen
