= Liangxiang Univ. Town West station =

Beijing Subway station

Liangxiang Univ. Town West 良乡大学城西
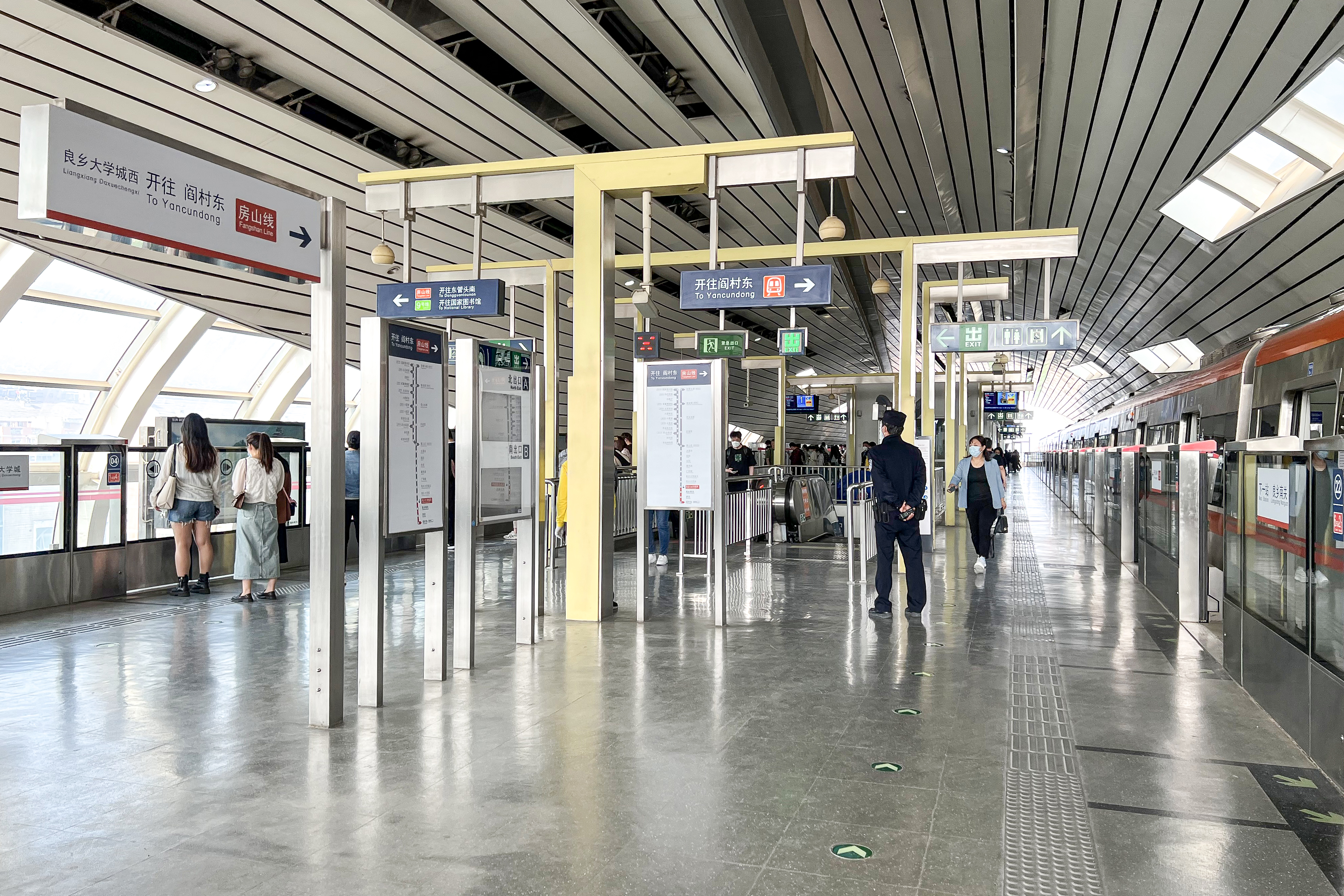
- Platform

General information
- Location: Changhong East Road (长虹东路) and Lanxiu North Street (揽秀北街); Fangshan District, Beijing; China
- Coordinates: 39°43′23″N 116°09′23″E
- Operator: Beijing Mass Transit Railway Operation Corporation Limited
- Line: Fangshan line
- Platforms: 2 (1 island platform)
- Tracks: 2

Construction
- Structure type: Elevated
- Accessible: Yes

History
- Opened: December 30, 2010

Services
Preceding station	Beijing Subway	Following station
Liangxiang Univ. Town towards Dongguantounan	Fangshan line	Liangxiang Nanguan towards Yancundong
Location
- Location within Beijing

Liangxiang Univ. Town West station (simplified Chinese: 良乡大学城西站; traditional Chinese: 良鄉大學城西站; pinyin: Liángxiāng Dàxuéchéng Xī zhàn) is a station on Fangshan Line of the Beijing Subway.

== Station layout ==
The station has an elevated island platform.

== Exits ==
There are 3 exits, lettered A1, A2, and B. Exits A2 and B are accessible.
