= Dabaotai station =

Beijing Subway station

Coordinates: 39.8077°N 116.2915°E

Dabaotai 大葆台
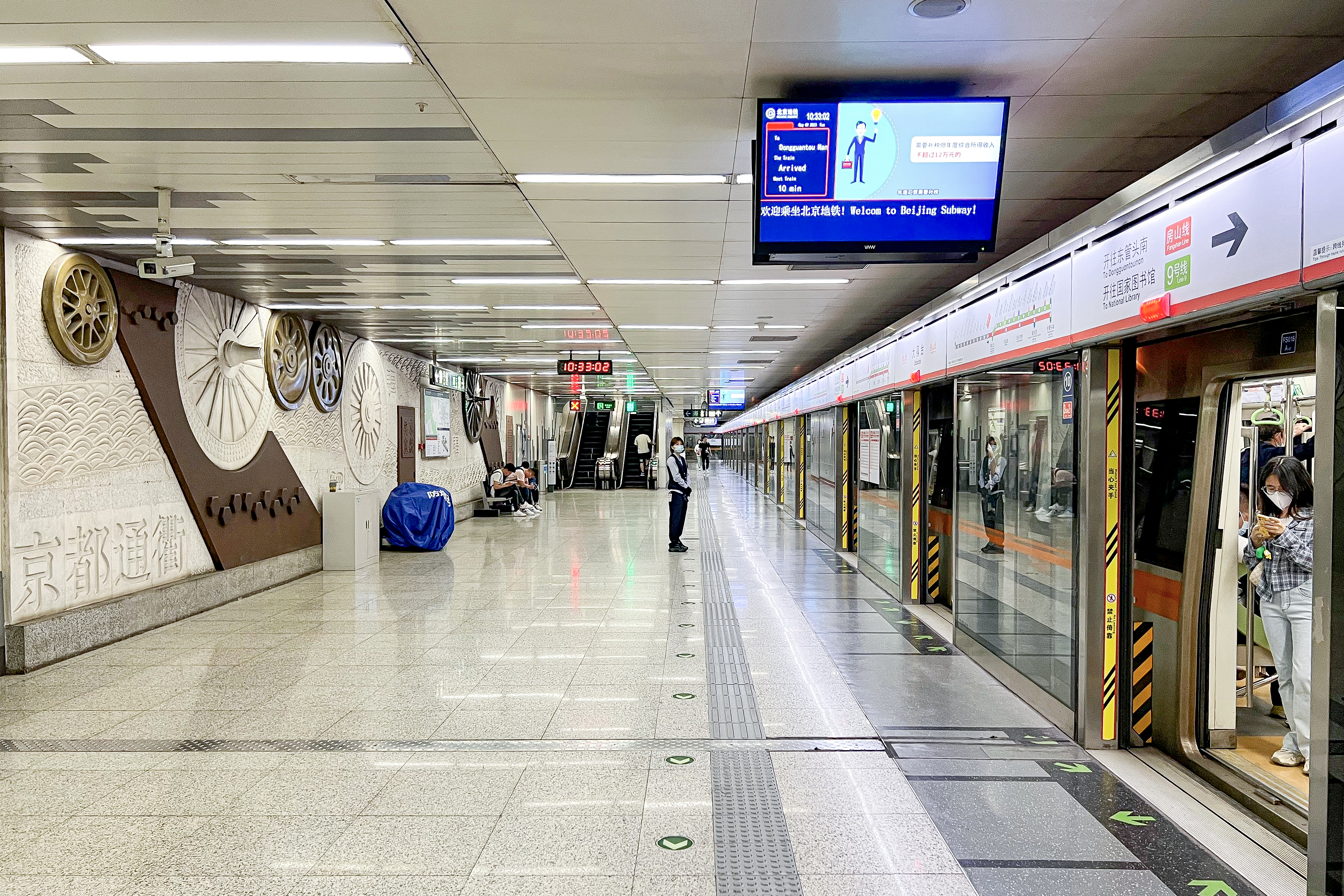
- Northbound platform

General information
- Location: Baotai Road (葆台路) and Fengbao Road (丰葆路); Fengtai District, Beijing; China
- Operator: Beijing Mass Transit Railway Operation Corporation Limited
- Line: Fangshan line
- Platforms: 2 (2 side platforms)
- Tracks: 2

Construction
- Structure type: Underground
- Accessible: Yes

History
- Opened: December 30, 2010

Services
Preceding station	Beijing Subway	Following station
Guogongzhuang towards Dongguantounan	Fangshan line	Daotian towards Yancundong
Location
- Location within Beijing

Dabaotai station (Chinese: 大葆台站; pinyin: Dàbǎotái Zhàn) is a station on Fangshan Line of the Beijing Subway, located in Fengtai District at the southern entrance of Beijing World Park. The station was the northern terminus of the line until it was extended one stop to Guogongzhuang on December 31, 2011.

== Station layout ==
The station has 2 underground side platforms.

== Exits ==
There are 4 exits, lettered A, B, C, and D. Exits A and D are accessible.

== Gallery ==
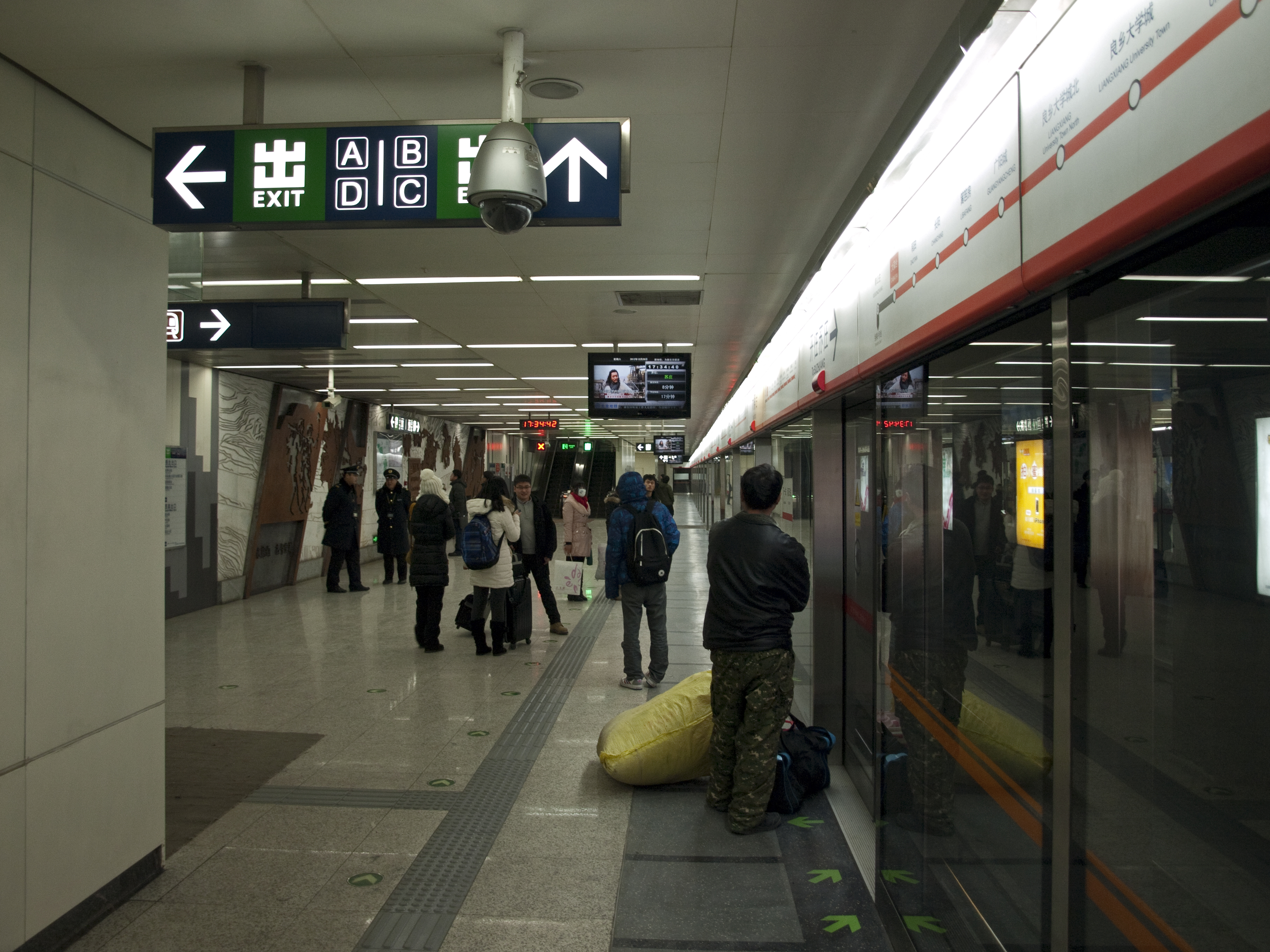
The platform

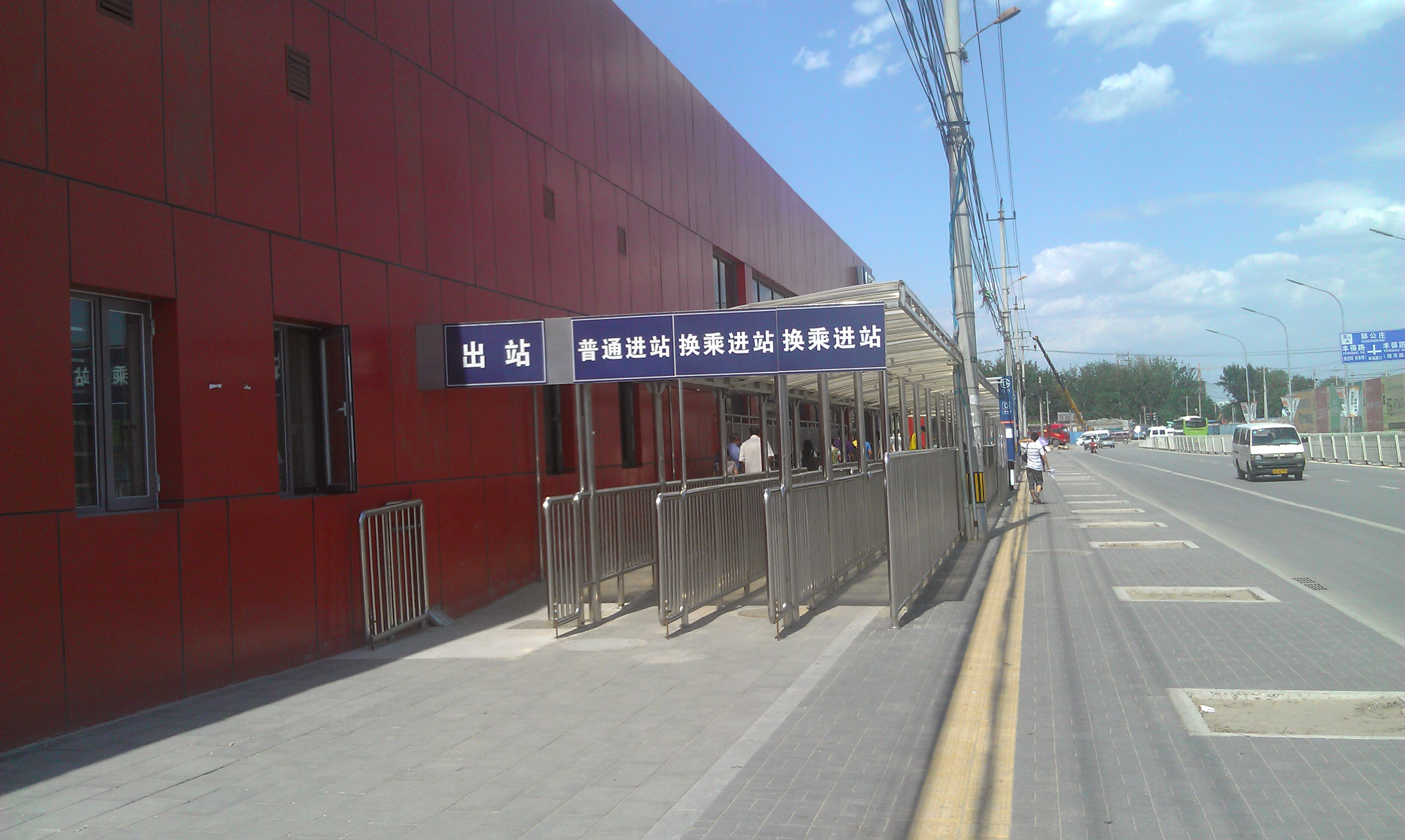
The exterior
