= Beizangcun =

Beizangcun Town 北臧村镇
- Town
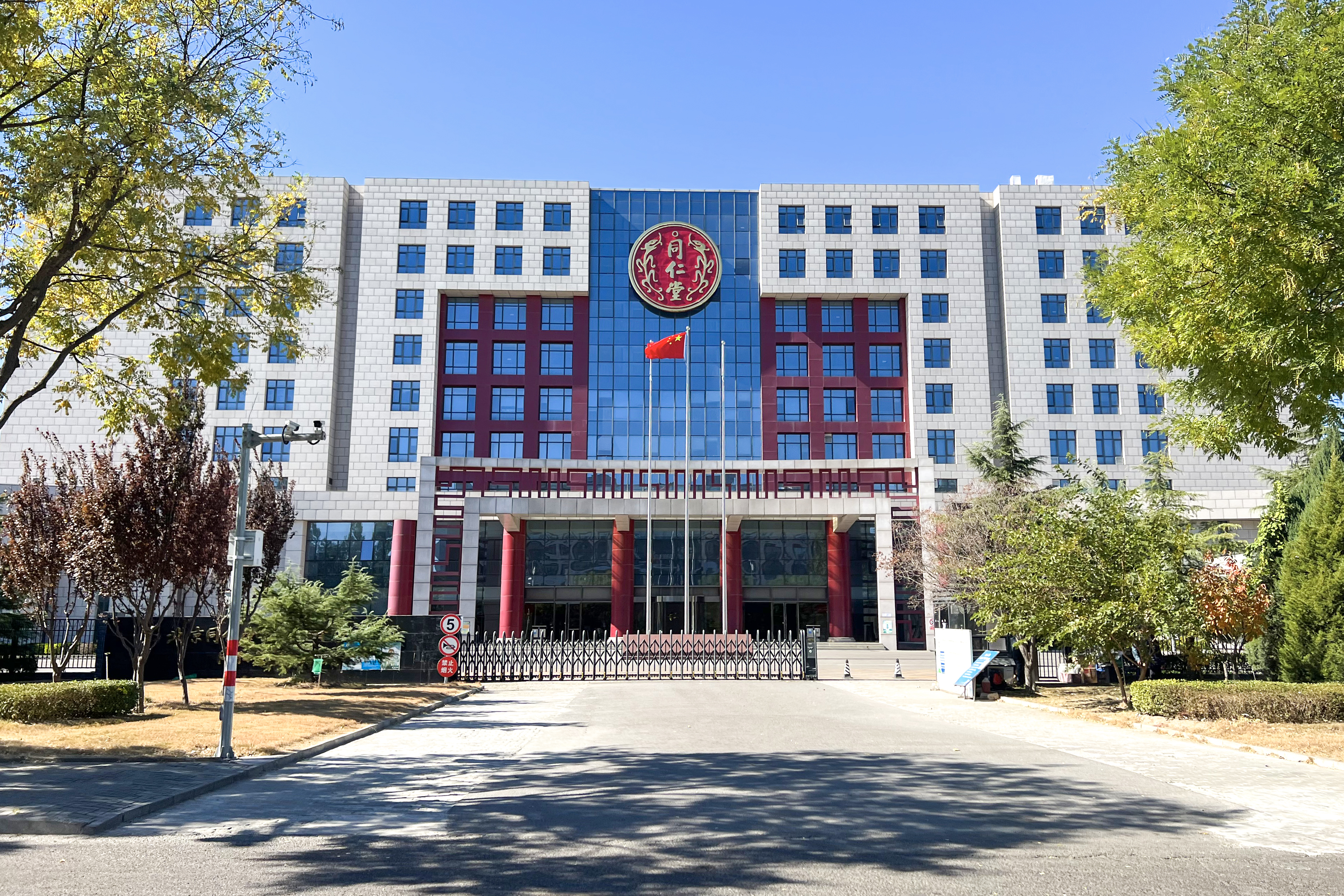
- Tongrentang Medical Base, 2022

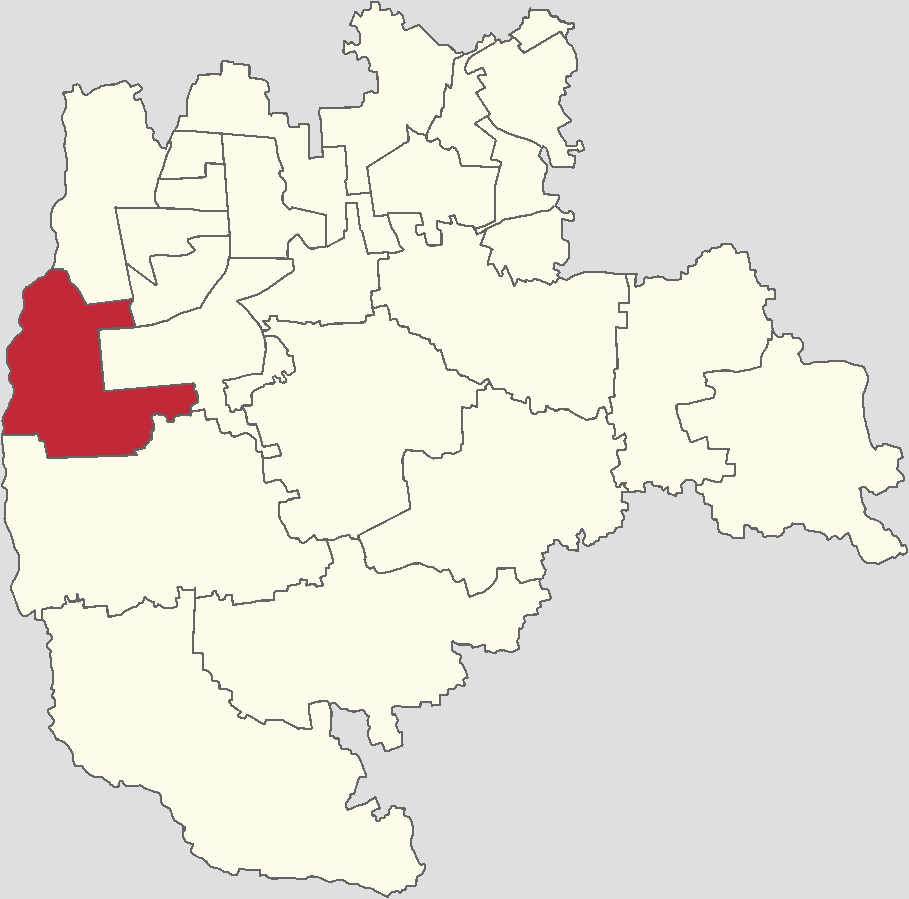
- Location of Beizangcun Town in Daxing District

- Location within Beijing Location within China
- Coordinates: 39°41′06″N 116°17′48″E
- Country: China
- Municipality: Beijing
- District: Daxing
- Village-level Divisions: 17 villages

Area
  - Total: 52.55 km^{2} (20.29 sq mi)
- Elevation: 40 m (130 ft)

Population (2020)
  - Total: 35,391
  - Density: 673.5/km^{2} (1,744/sq mi)
- Time zone: UTC+8 (China Standard)
- Postal code: 102609
- Area code: 010

Beizangcun Town (simplified Chinese: 北臧村镇; traditional Chinese: 北臧村鎮; pinyin: Běizāngcūn Zhèn) is a town in the west side of Daxing District, Beijing, China. It shares border with Huangcun Town to the north, Linxiaolu and Tiangongyuan Subdistricts to the east, Panggezhuang Town to the south, as well as Liulihe and Changyang Towns to the west. According to the 2020 census, Beizangcun Town was home to 35,391 residents.

The name Beizangcun (Chinese: 北臧村; lit. 'North Zang Village') refers to Beizang Village that preceded the current town.

== History ==
Timeline of Beizangcun's History
Year	Status	Under
1949 - 1953	Panggezhuang 2nd District	Daxing County, Hebei
1953 - 1956	Dazangcun Township Zhaojiachang Township Xinlicun Township	Daxing County, Hebei
1956 - 1958	Beizangcun Township	Daxing County, Hebei
1958 - 1960	Beizangcun Township, administered by Panggezhuang People's Commune	Daxing County, Beijing
1960 - 1965	Beizangcun People's Commune	Daxing County, Beijing
1965 - 1968	Tiantanghe People's Commune	Daxing County, Beijing
1968 - 1981	Dongfanghong People's Commune	Daxing County, Beijing
1981 - 1983	Beizangcun People's Commune	Daxing County, Beijing
1983 - 2000	Beizangcun Township	Daxing County, Beijing
2000 - 2001	Beizangcun Town	Daxing County, Beijing
2001–present	Beizangcun Town	Daxing District, Beijing

== Administrative divisions ==
In the year 2021, Beizangcun Town was divided into 17 villages:

Administrative division code	Subdivision names	Name transliterations
110115109200	六合庄村	Liuhezhuang Cun
110115109201	马村	Macun
110115109202	新立村	Xinli Cun
110115109205	桑马房村	Sangmafang Cun
110115109206	八家村	Bajia Cun
110115109209	西大营村	Xidaying Cun
110115109212	大臧村	Dazang Cun
110115109213	赵家场村	Zhaojiachang Cun
110115109214	巴园子村	Bayuanzi Cun
110115109215	诸葛营村	Zhugeying Cun
110115109216	西王庄村	Xiwangzhuang Cun
110115109217	皮各庄一村	Pigezhuang Yicun
110115109218	皮各庄二村	Pigezhuang Ercun
110115109219	皮各庄三村	Pigezhuang Sancun
110115109220	梨园村	Liyuan Cun
110115109221	前管营村	Qianguanying Cun
110115109222	北高各庄村	Bei Gaogezhuang Cun

== Gallery ==
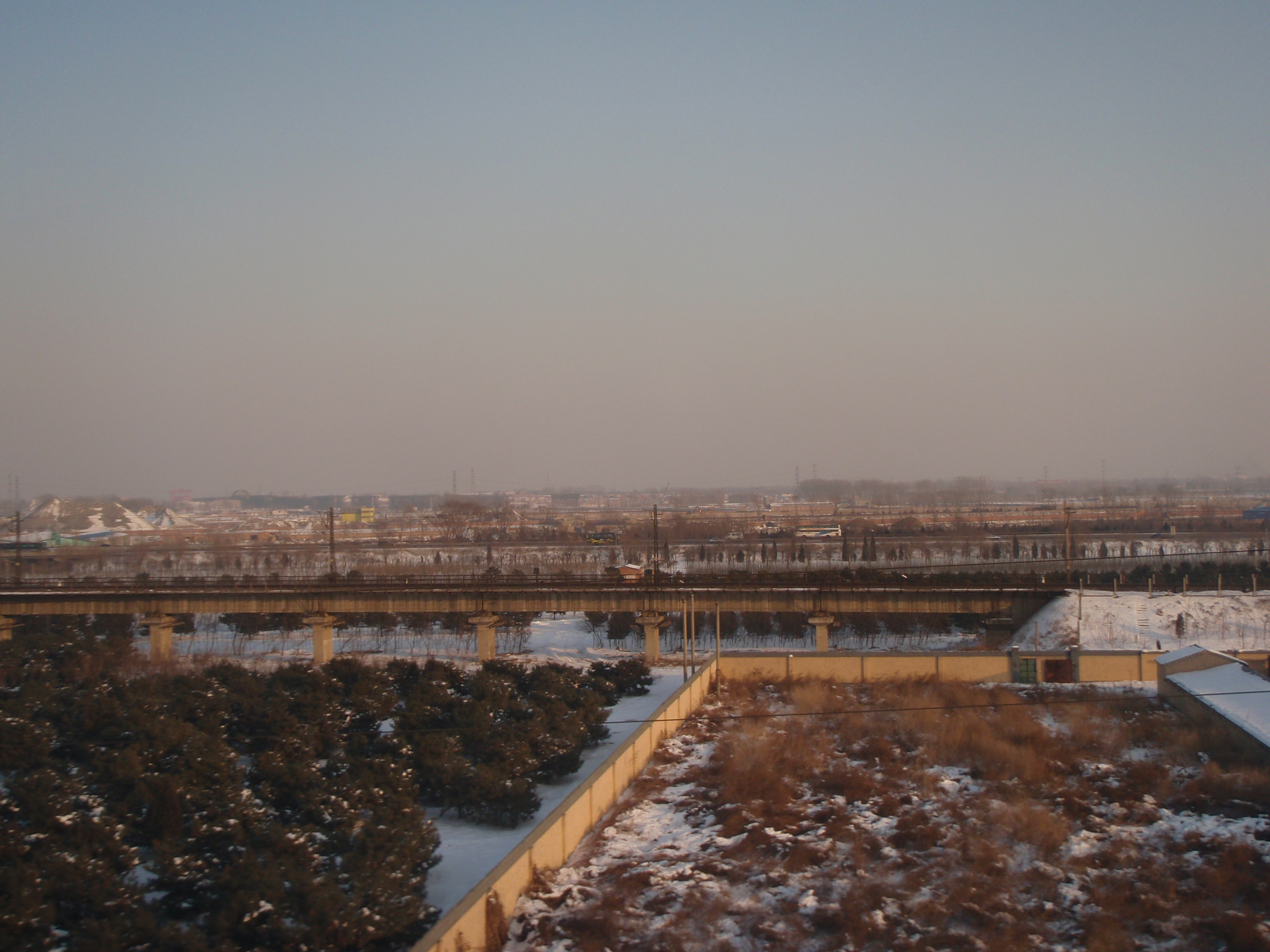
Snow around the Weiyong Road, 2010

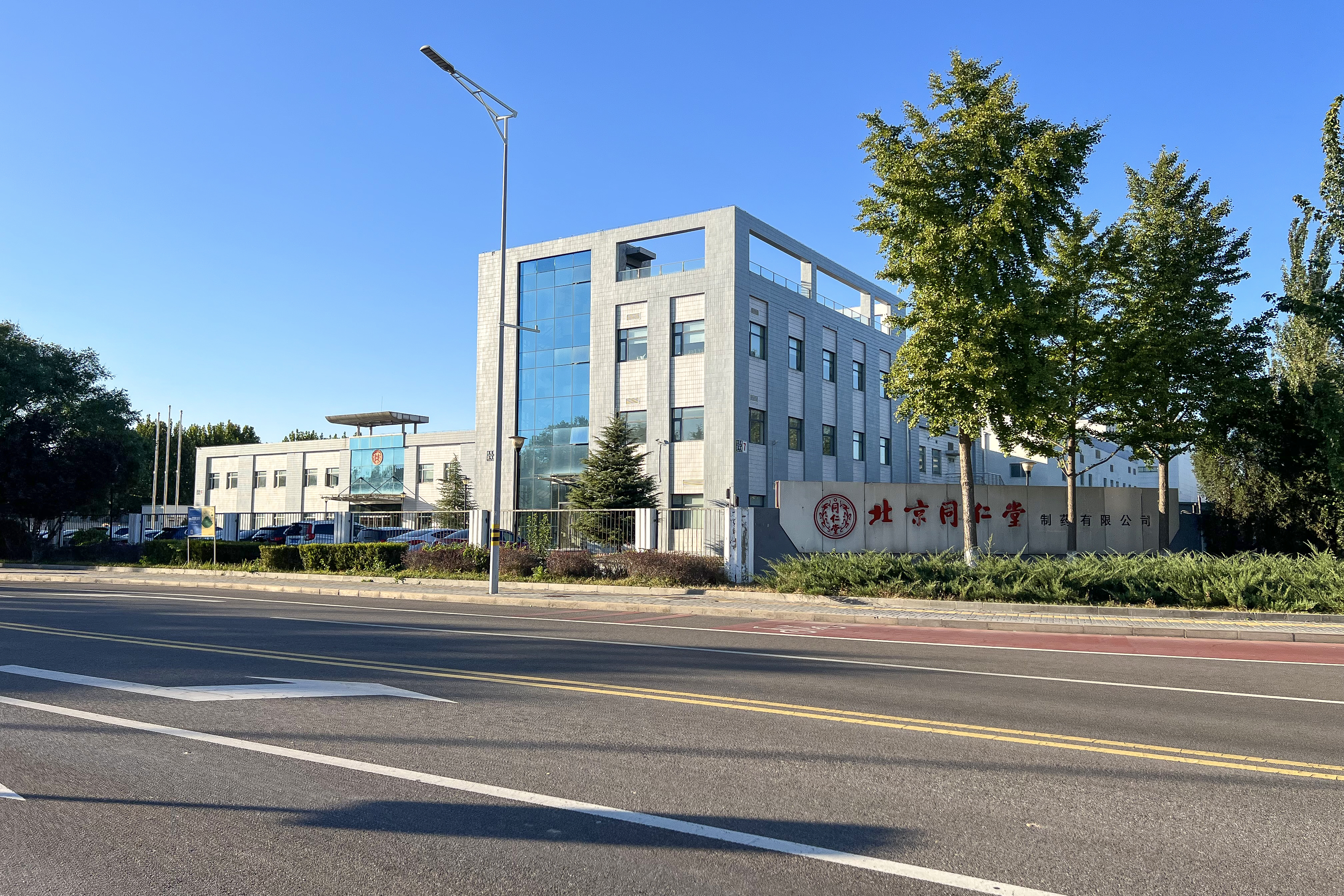
Beijing Tongrentang Pharmaceutical Co Ltd., 2022

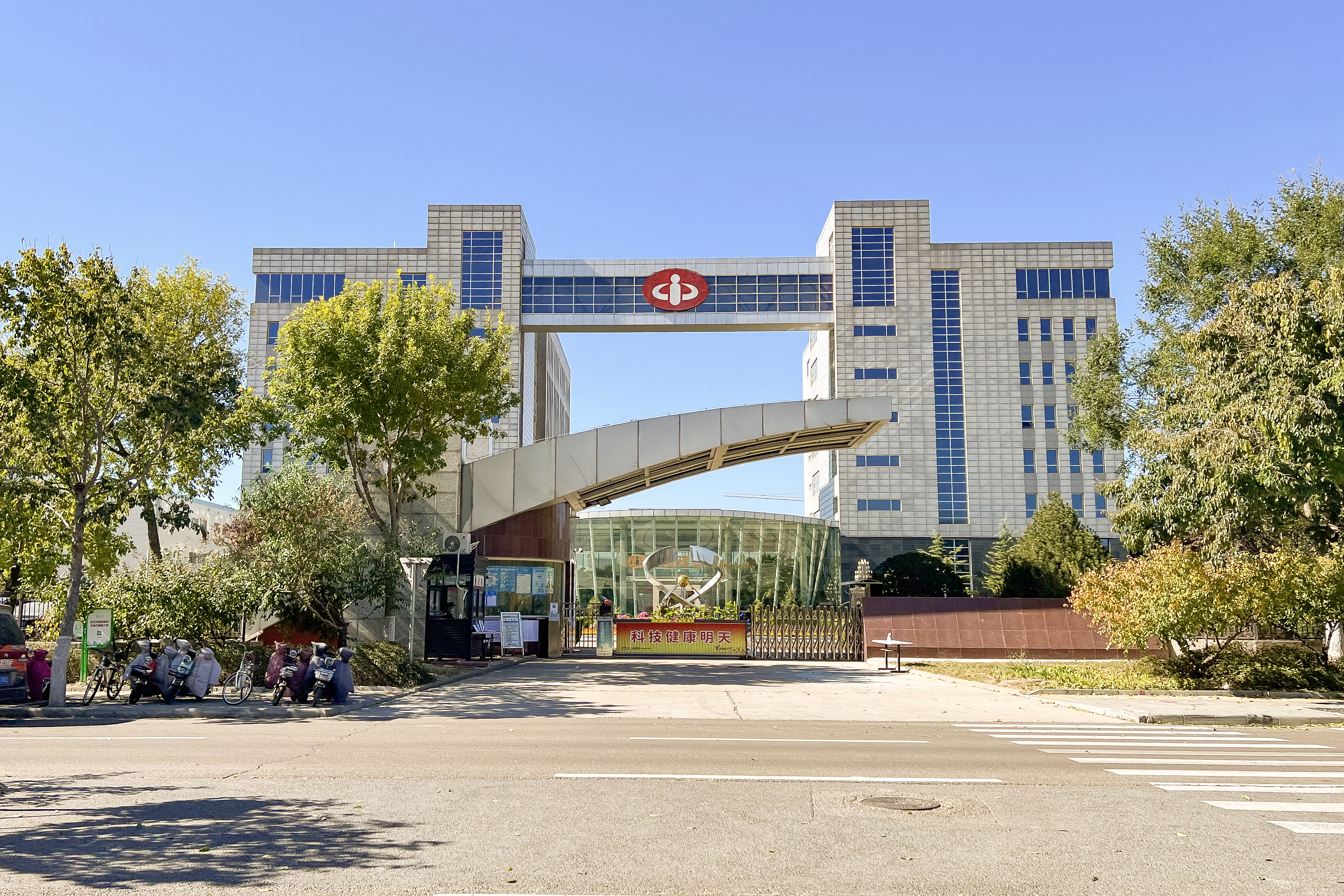
Beijing Yiling Pharmaceutical, 2022

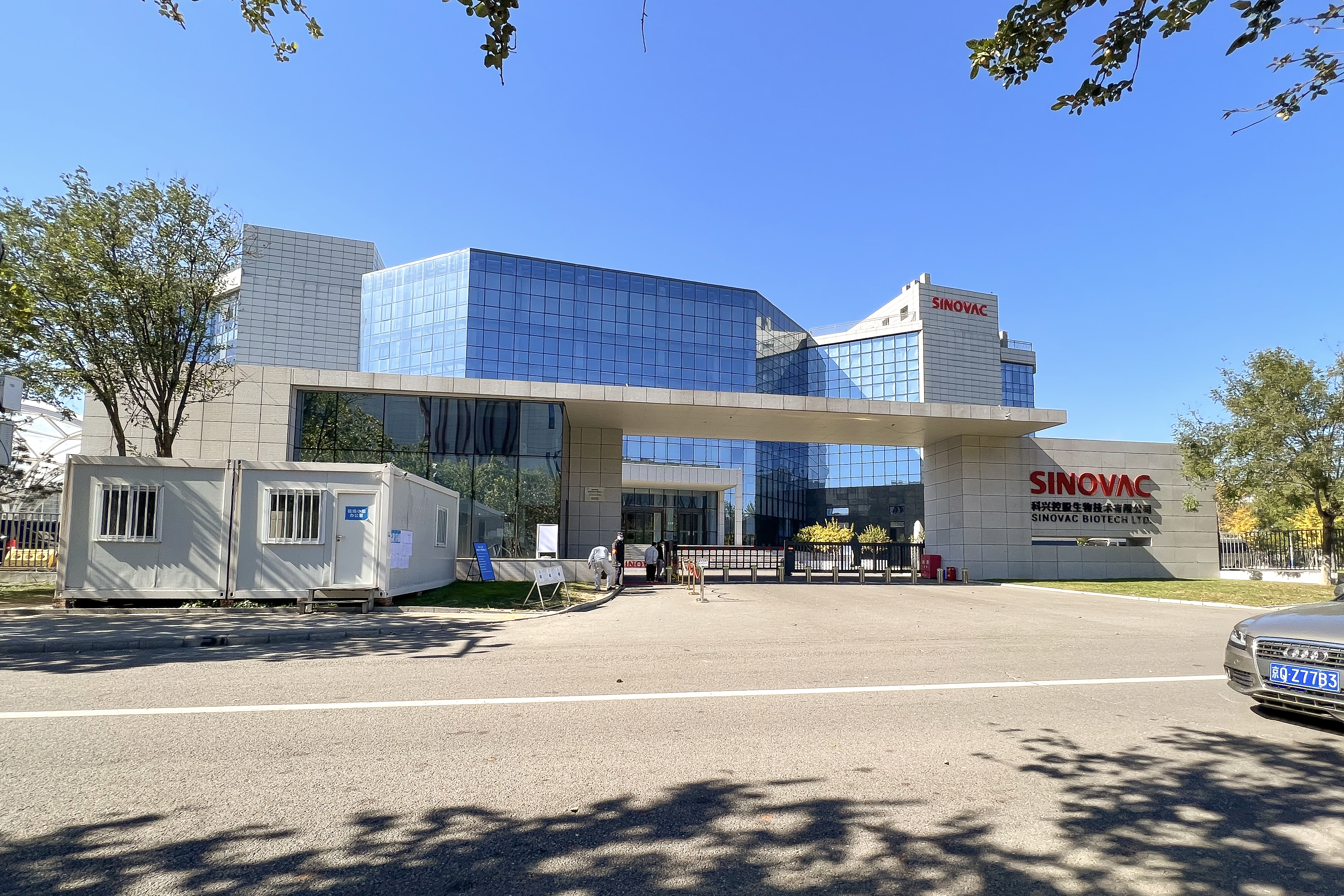
Sinovac Biotech headquarters, 2022

== See also ==
- List of township-level divisions of Beijing
