= Weishanzhuang =

Weishanzhuang Town 魏善庄镇
- Town
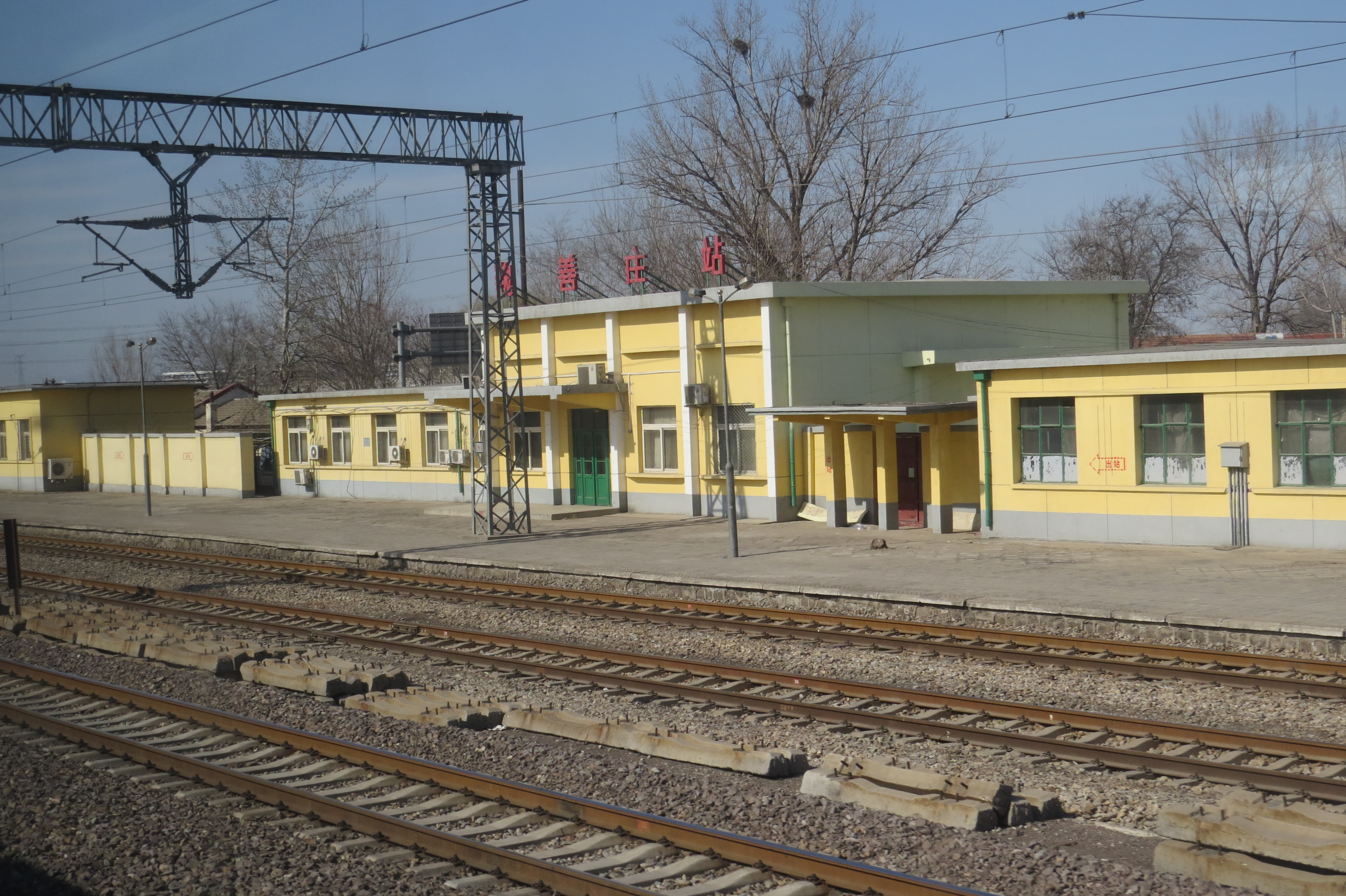
- Weishanzhuang Railway Station on Beijing–Shanghai railway, 2016

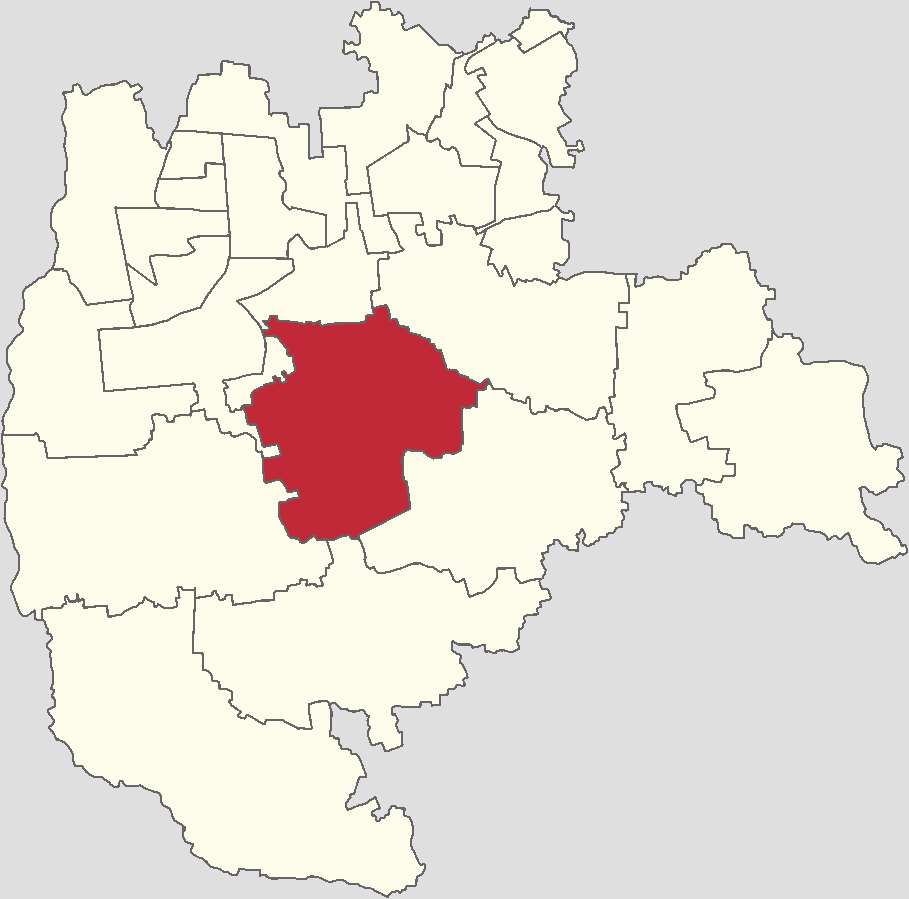
- Location in Daxing District

- Location within Beijing Location within China
- Coordinates: 39°37′48″N 116°24′30″E
- Country: China
- Municipality: Beijing
- District: Daxing
- Village-level Divisions: 39 villages

Area
  - Total: 81.12 km^{2} (31.32 sq mi)
- Elevation: 31 m (102 ft)

Population (2020)
  - Total: 46,661
  - Density: 575.2/km^{2} (1,490/sq mi)
- Time zone: UTC+8 (China Standard)
- Postal code: 102611
- Area code: 010

Weishanzhuang Town (simplified Chinese: 魏善庄镇; traditional Chinese: 魏善莊鎮; pinyin: Wèishànzhuāng Zhèn) is a town situated in the center of Daxing District, Beijing, China. It borders Huangcun Town in the north, Qingyundian and Anding Towns in the east, Lixian Town in the south, Panggezhuang Town and Tiangongyuan Subdistrict in the west. As of 2020, it was home to 46,661 people.

== History ==
Timetable of Weishanzhuang Town
Time	Status	Part of
Ming and Qing dynasty	Lixian Inspection Division Huangcun Inspection Division	Daxing County, Shuntian Prefecture
1949 - 1958	1st District 3rd District 4th District	Daxing County, Hebei
1958 - 1960	Within Anding People's Commune	Daxing District, Beijing
1960 - 1961	Within Anding People's Commune	Daxing County, Beijing
1961 - 1974	Weishanzhuang People's Commune	Daxing County, Beijing
1974 - 1983	Weishanzhuang People's Commune Banbidian People's Commune	Daxing County, Beijing
1983 - 2000	Weishanzhuang Township Banbidian Township	Daxing County, Beijing
2000 - 2001	Weishanzhuang Town	Daxing County, Beijing
2001–present	Weishanzhuang Town	Daxing District, Beijing

== Administrative divisions ==
By 2021, Weishanzhuang Town consisted of 39 villages:

Administrative division code	Subdivision names	Name transliterations
110115110200	后大营村	Houdaying Cun
110115110201	吴庄村	Wuzhuang Cun
110115110202	西芦垡村	Xi Lufa Cun
110115110203	东芦垡村	Dong Lufa Cun
110115110204	韩村	Hancun
110115110205	羊坊村	Yangfang Cun
110115110206	查家马房村	Chajia Mafang Cun
110115110207	伊庄村	Yizhuang Cun
110115110208	兴隆庄村	Xinglongzhuang Cun
110115110209	北研垡村	Beiyanfa Cun
110115110210	车站村	Chezhan Cun
110115110211	魏善庄村	Weishanzhuang Cun
110115110212	王各庄村	Wanggezhuang Cun
110115110213	穆园子村	Muyuanzi Cun
110115110214	赵庄子村	Zhaozhuangzi Cun
110115110215	崔家庄一村	Cuijiazhuang Yicun
110115110216	崔家庄二村	Cuijiazhuang Ercun
110115110217	河北辛庄村	Hebei Xinzhuang Cun
110115110218	河南辛庄村	Henan Xinzhuang Cun
110115110219	大刘各庄村	Da Liugezhuang Cun
110115110220	东枣林庄村	Dong Zaolinzhuang Cun
110115110221	西枣林庄村	Xi Zaolinzhuang Cun
110115110222	三顺庄村	Sanshunzhuang Cun
110115110223	陈各庄村	Chengezhuang Cun
110115110224	北田各庄村	Bei Tiangezhuang Cun
110115110225	南田各庄村	Nan Tiangezhuang Cun
110115110226	后苑上村	Hou Yuanshang Cun
110115110227	前苑上村	Qian Yuanshang Cun
110115110228	岳家务村	Yuejiawu Cun
110115110229	魏庄村	Weizhuang Cun
110115110230	半壁店村	Banbidian Cun
110115110231	西南研垡村	Xi Nanyanfa Cun
110115110232	东南研垡村	Dong Nnayanfa Cun
110115110233	大狼垡村	Dalangfa Cun
110115110234	西沙窝村	Xi Shawo Cun
110115110235	东沙窝村	Dong Shawo Cun
110115110236	李家场村	Lijiachang Cun
110115110237	刘家场村	Liujiachang Cun
110115110238	张家场村	Zhangjiachang Cun

== Gallery ==
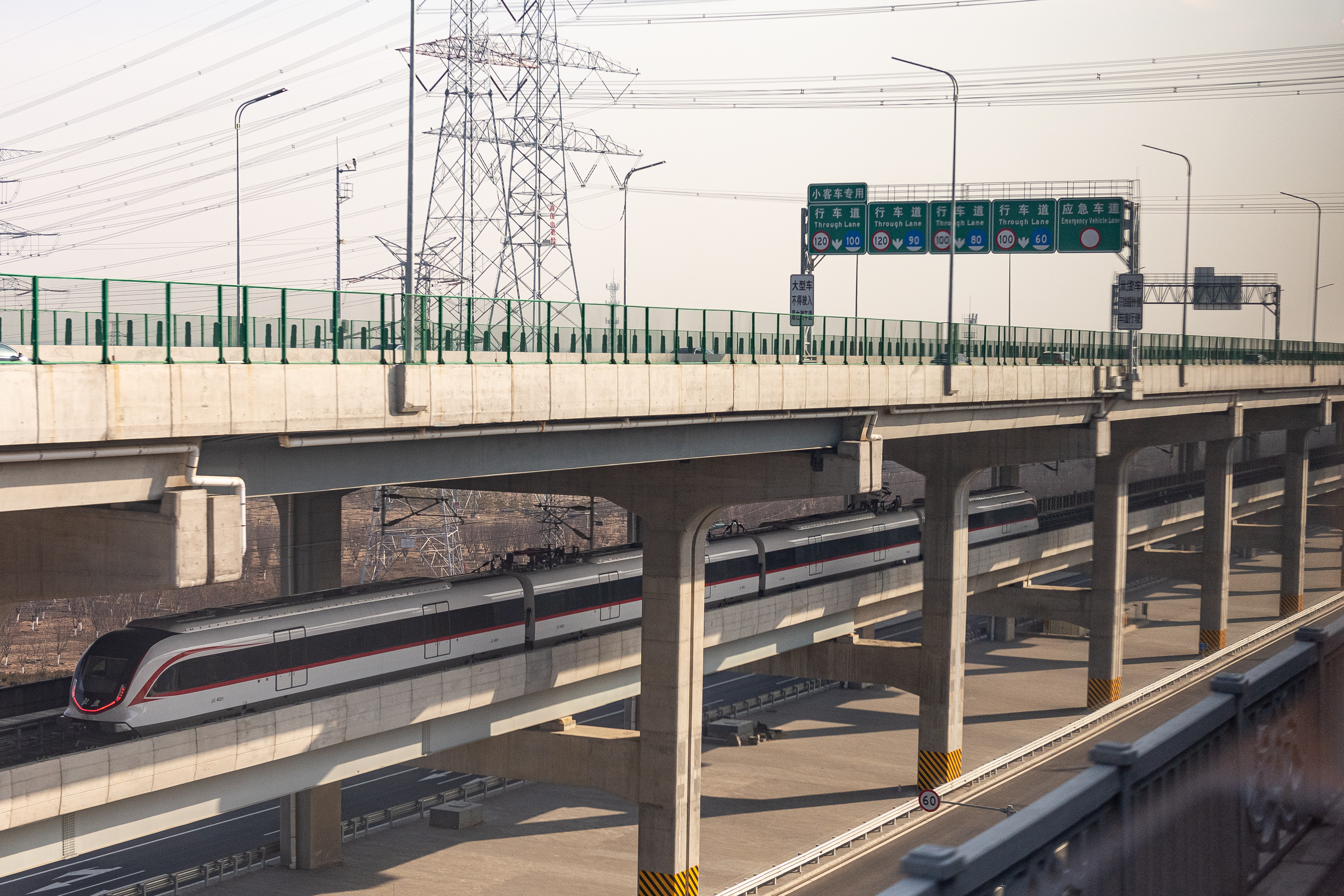
Daxing Airport Expressway near Dongzaolin, 2020

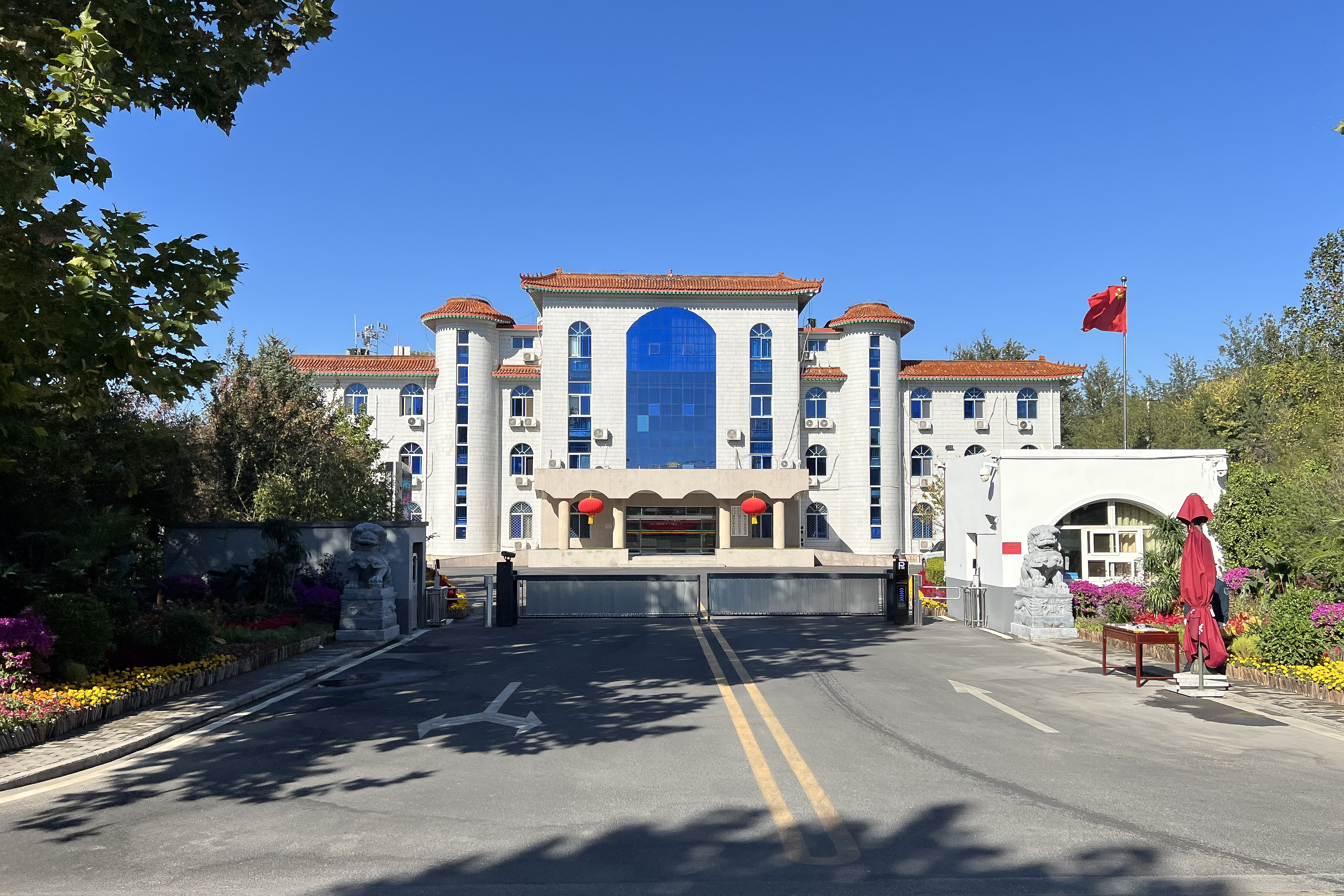
Government of Weishanzhuang Town, 2022

== See also ==
- List of township-level divisions of Beijing
