= Daxing Biomedical Industry Base =

Daxing Biomedical Industry Base 大兴生物医药产业基地
- Township-level Division
- Zhongguancun Science and Technology Park Daxing Biomedical Industry Base 中关村科技园区大兴生物医药产业基地
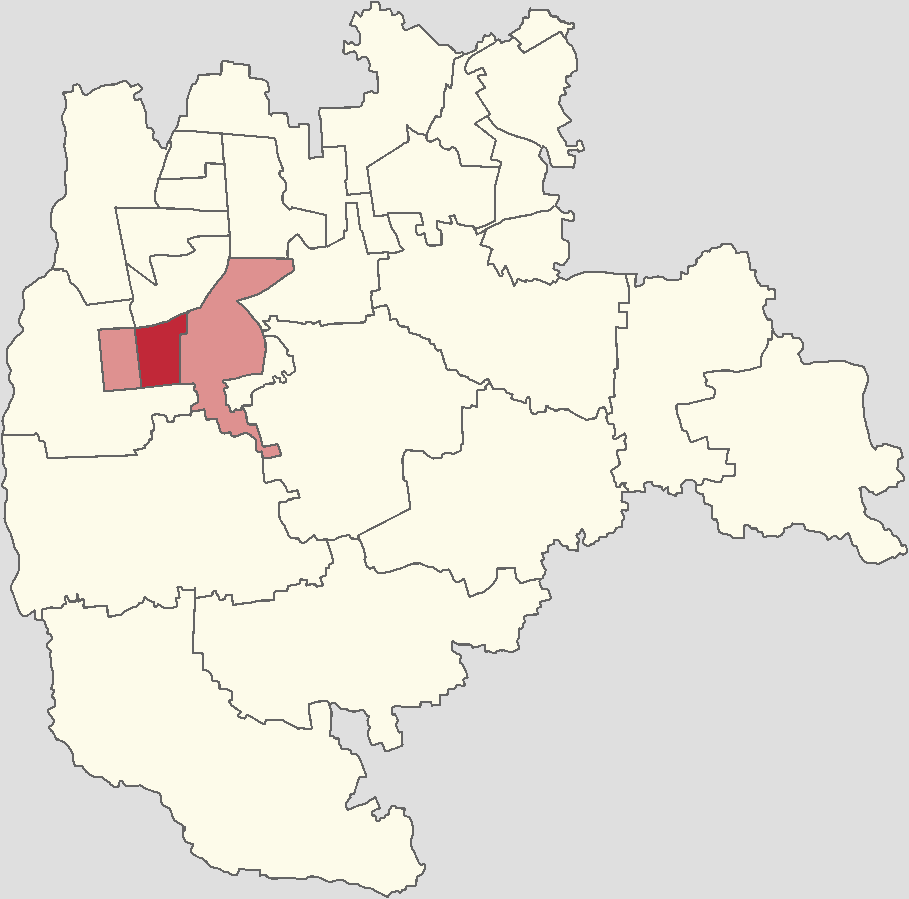
- Location of Biomedical Industry Base (red) within Tiangongyuan Subdistrict (light red), inside of Daxing District

- Location within Beijing Location within China
- Coordinates: 39°41′5″N 116°18′56″E
- Country: China
- Municipality: Beijing
- District: Daxing

Area
  - Total: 6.83 km^{2} (2.64 sq mi)

Population (2020)
  - Total: 10,201
  - Density: 1,490/km^{2} (3,870/sq mi)
- Time zone: UTC+8 (China Standard)
- Area code: 010

Daxing Biomedical Industry Base, full name Zhongguancun Science and Technology Park Daxing Biomedical Industry Base (simplified Chinese: 中关村科技园区大兴生物医药产业基地; traditional Chinese: 中關村科技園區大興生物醫藥產業基地), is a state-level economic and technological development zone in Tiangongyuan Subdistrict, Daxing District, Beijing, China. As of 2020, its census population was 10,201.
