= Doudian =

Doudian 窦店镇
- Town
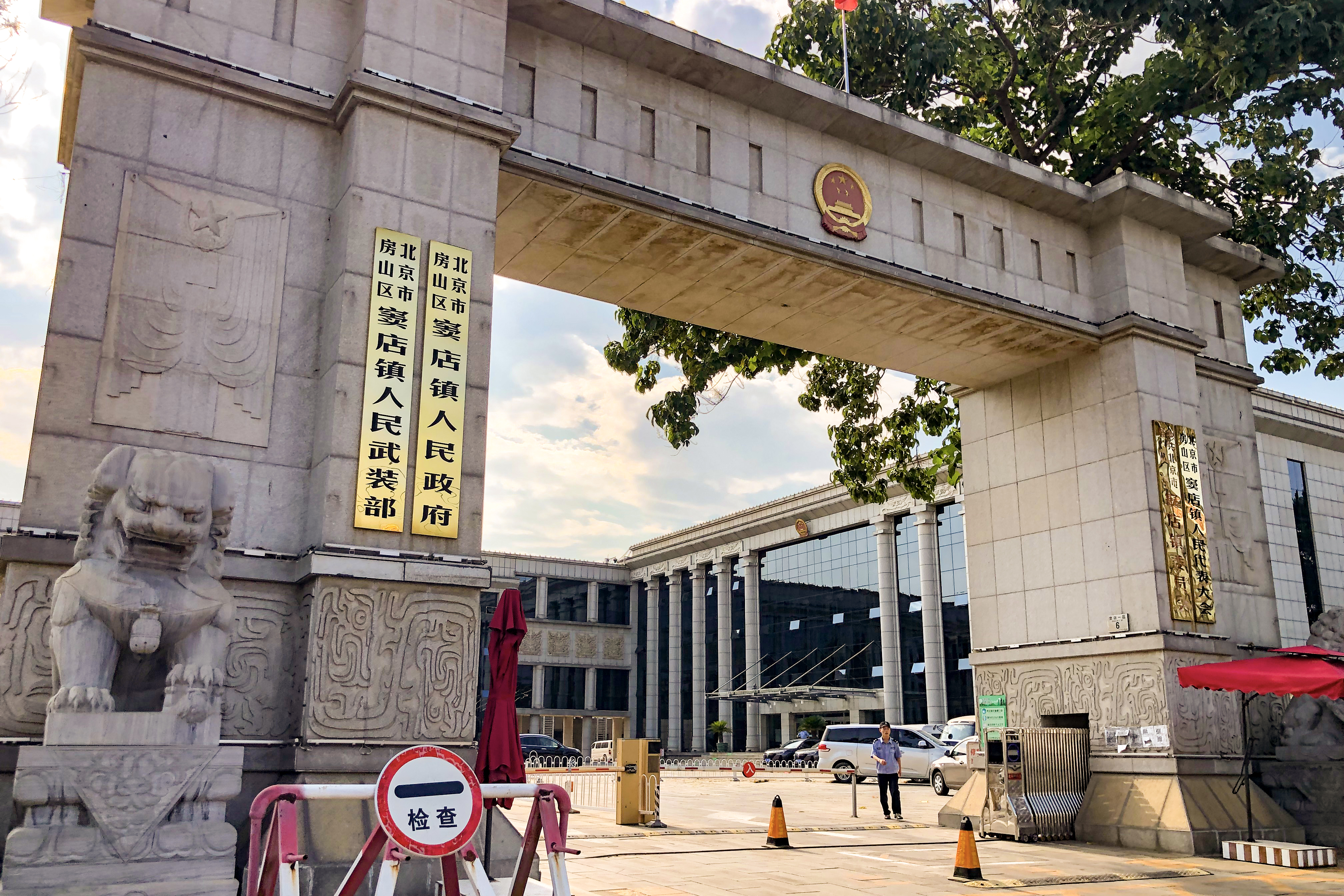
- Government office of Doudian, 2021

- Location within Beijing Location within China
- Coordinates: 39°39′01″N 116°03′42″E
- Country: China
- Municipality: Beijing
- District: Fangshan
- Village-level Divisions: 14 communities 30 villages

Area
  - Total: 6,523 km^{2} (2,519 sq mi)

Population (2020)
  - Total: 96,184
  - Density: 14.75/km^{2} (38.19/sq mi)
- Time zone: UTC+8 (China Standard)
- Postal code: 102402
- Area code: 010

Doudian (Chinese: 窦店镇; pinyin: Dòudiàn Zhèn) is a town situated in southeastern Fangshan District, Beijing, China. It shares border with Yancun and Liangxiang Towns in its north, Changyang Town in its east, Liulihe Town in its south, Shilou Town and Chengguan Subdistrict in its west. Its population was 96,184 according to the 2020 census.

The town's name Doudian (Chinese: 窦店; lit. 'Dou's Shop') is a reference to Dou Jiande, a rebel leader who fought against the Sui dynasty and had once stationed his troops in the town.

== History ==
History of Doudian
Time	Status
Ming dynasty	Known as Doudianli
1918	Under Liangxiang County
1949	Under the 7th District
1956	Under Doudian Hui Autonomous Township and Jiaodao Township
1958	Under Liulihe People's Commune
1960	Under Fangshan County
1961	Under Doudian People's Commune and Jiaodao People's Commune
1983	Doudian People's Commune was transformed into a township
1989	Transformed into a town
2001	Jiaodao joined Doudian

== Administrative Divisions ==
As of 2021, Doudian was made up of 44 subdivisions, of which 14 were communities and 30 were villages:

Administrative division code	Subdivision names	Name transliteration	Type
110111103001	亚新特种建材公司	Yaxin Tezhong Jiancai Gongsi	Community
110111103002	金鑫苑	Jinxinyuan	Community
110111103003	沁园春景	Qinyuan Chunjing	Community
110111103004	田家园	Tianjiayuan	Community
110111103005	窦店	Doudian	Community
110111103006	京南嘉园	Jingnan Jiayuan	Community
110111103007	山水汇豪苑	Shanshuihui Haoyuan	Community
110111103008	于庄	Yuzhuang	Community
110111103009	乐汇家园	Lehui Jiayuan	Community
110111103010	汇景嘉园	Huijing Jiayuan	Community
110111103011	腾龙家园	Tenglong Jiayuan	Community
110111103012	华城家园	Huacheng Jiayuan	Community
110111103013	燕都世界名园	Yandu Shijie Mingyuan	Community
110111103014	提香草堂	Tixiang Caotang	Community
110111103200	窦店	Doudian	Village
110111103201	白草洼	Baicaowa	Village
110111103202	芦村	Lucun	Village
110111103203	板桥	Banqiao	Village
110111103204	西安庄	Xi'anzhuang	Village
110111103205	田家园	Tianjiayuan	Village
110111103206	瓦窑头	Wayaotou	Village
110111103207	苏村	Sucun	Village
110111103208	于庄	Yuzhuang	Village
110111103209	下坡店	Xiapodian	Village
110111103210	七里店	Qilidian	Village
110111103211	望楚	Wangchu	Village
110111103212	一街	Yijie	Village
110111103213	二街	Erjie	Village
110111103214	三街	Sanjie	Village
110111103215	后街	Houjie	Village
110111103216	小高舍	Xiao Gaoshe	Village
110111103217	大高舍	Da Gaoshe	Village
110111103218	丁各庄	Dinggezhuang	Village
110111103219	刘平庄	Liupingzhuang	Village
110111103220	袁庄	Yuanzhuang	Village
110111103221	六股道	Liugudao	Village
110111103222	普安屯	Pu'antun	Village
110111103223	兴隆庄	Xinglongzhuang	Village
110111103224	辛庄户	Xinzhuanghu	Village
110111103225	两间房	Liangjianfang	Village
110111103226	前柳	Qianliu	Village
110111103227	陈家房	Chenjiafang	Village
110111103228	北柳	Beiliu	Village
110111103229	河口	Hekou	Village

== See also ==
- List of township-level divisions of Beijing
