= Liulihe =

Liulihe Town 琉璃河镇
- Town
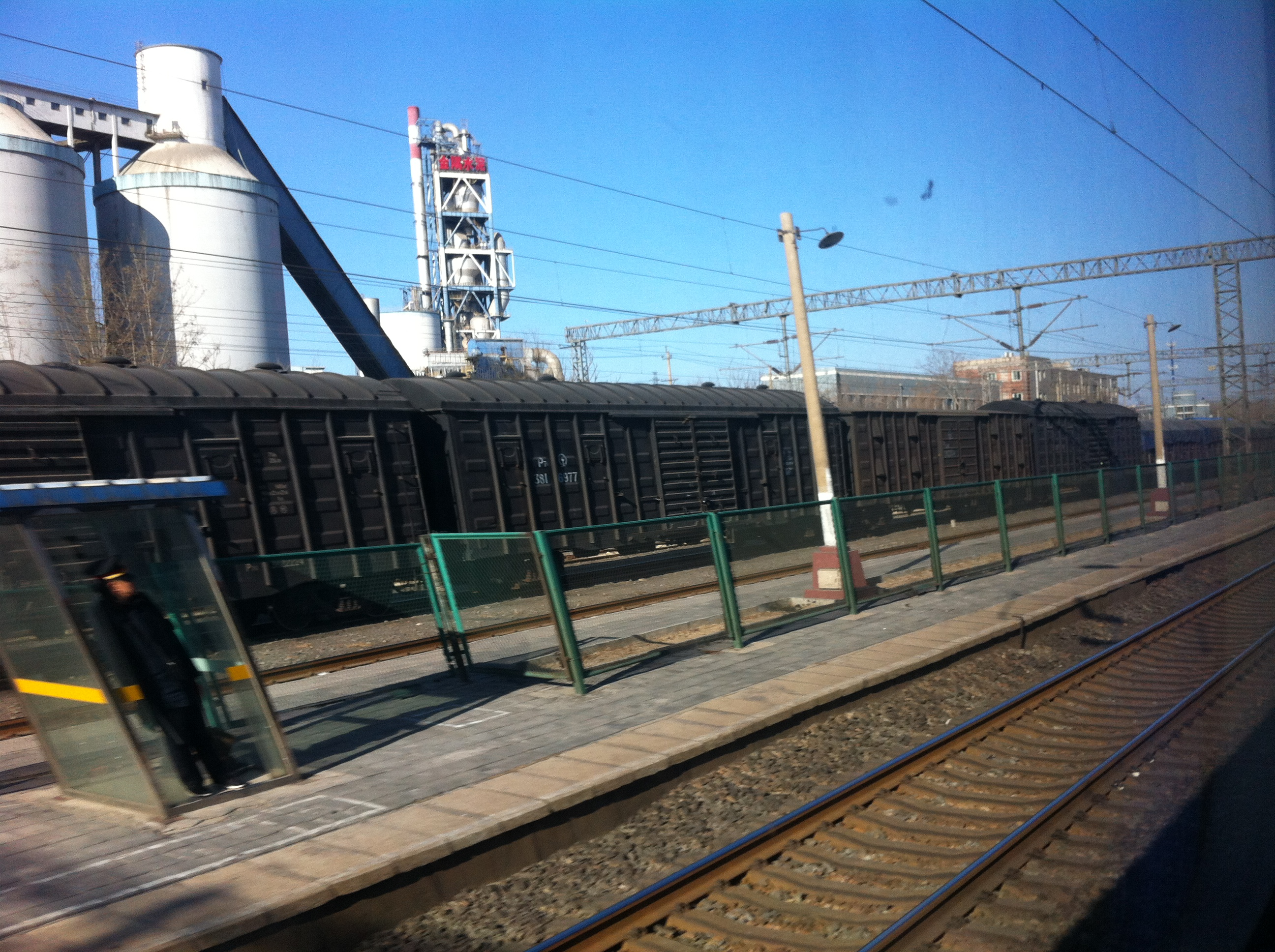
- Liulihe Station of the Beijing–Guangzhou railway, 2014

- Location within Beijing Location within China
- Coordinates: 39°36′40″N 116°01′45″E
- Country: China
- Municipality: Beijing
- District: Fangshan
- Village-level Divisions: 5 communities 47 villages

Area
  - Total: 107 km^{2} (41 sq mi)

Population (2020)
  - Total: 66,787
  - Density: 624/km^{2} (1,620/sq mi)
- Time zone: UTC+8 (China Standard)
- Postal code: 102403
- Area code: 010

Liulihe Town (Chinese: 琉璃河镇; pinyin: Liúlíhé Zhèn) is a town in Fangshan District, Beijing. It borders Shilou, Doudian and Changyang Towns in its north, Beizangcun and Panggezhuang Towns in its east, Zhuolu City in its south, and Hancunhe Town in its west. In the year 2020, its total population was 66,787.

The name Liulihe (Chinese: 琉璃河; lit. 'Lapis Lazuli River') comes from the Liuli River that passes through the town.

== History ==
Timeline of Liulihe Area
Time	Status
Ming dynasty	Known as Yanguli
Qing dynasty	Known as Liulihe Town
1916	Part of Liangxiang County
1928	Under the 3rd District of Liangxiang County
1949	Part of the 7th District of Liangxiang County
1951	Part of the 3rd District of Liangxiang County
1958	Part of Liulehe People's Commune, under Zhoukoudian District
1960	Transferred to Fangshang County
1980	Restored as Liulihe Town
1983	Reorganized into a township
1989	Reorganized into an area
2000	Became a town while retaining the status of area
2002	Incorporated Dongnanzhao Town and Yaoshang Township

== Administrative divisions ==
In 2021, Liulihe Area oversaw 52 subdivisions, which can be further classified into 5 communities and 47 villages:

Administrative division code	Subdivision names	Name transliteration	Type
110111010001	二街	Erjie	Community
110111010002	窗纱厂	Chuanshachang	Community
110111010003	琉璃河水泥厂	Liulihe Shuinichang	Community
110111010004	建材工业学校	Jiancai Gongye Xuexiao	Community
110111010005	金果林	Jinguolin	Community
110111010200	二街	Erjie	Village
110111010201	三街	Sanjie	Village
110111010202	李庄	Lizhuang	Village
110111010203	白庄	Baizhuang	Village
110111010204	杨户屯	Yanghutun	Village
110111010205	周庄	Zhouzhuang	Village
110111010206	福兴	Fuxing	Village
110111010207	平各庄	Pinggezhuang	Village
110111010208	北洛	Beiluo	Village
110111010209	南洛	Nanluo	Village
110111010210	古庄	Guzhuang	Village
110111010211	祖村	Zucun	Village
110111010212	北章	Beizhang	Village
110111010213	兴礼	Xingli	Village
110111010214	庄头	Zhuangtou	Village
110111010215	立教	Lijiao	Village
110111010216	董家林	Dongjialin	Village
110111010217	刘李店	Liulidian	Village
110111010218	洄城	Huicheng	Village
110111010219	黄土坡	Nantupo	Village
110111010220	东南召	Dongnanzhao	Village
110111010221	西南召	Xinanzhao	Village
110111010222	东南吕	Dongnanlü	Village
110111010223	西南吕	Xinanlü	Village
110111010224	保兴庄	Baoxingzhuang	Village
110111010225	路村	Lucun	Village
110111010226	南白	Nanbai	Village
110111010227	北白	Beibai	Village
110111010228	八间房	Bajiandian	Village
110111010229	薛庄	Xuezhuang	Village
110111010230	石村	Shicun	Village
110111010231	常舍	Changshe	Village
110111010232	西地	Xidi	Village
110111010233	务滋	Wuzi	Village
110111010234	赵营	Zhaoying	Village
110111010235	任营	Renying	Village
110111010236	万里	Wanli	Village
110111010237	肖场	Xiaochang	Village
110111010238	窑上	Yaoshang	Village
110111010239	大陶	Datao	Village
110111010240	小陶	Xiaotao	Village
110111010241	官庄	Guanzhuang	Village
110111010242	贾河	Jiahe	Village
110111010243	鲍庄	Baozhuang	Village
110111010244	辛庄	Xinzhuang	Village
110111010245	五间房	Wujianfang	Village
110111010246	韩营	Hangying	Village

== Landmark ==
- Western Zhou Yan State Capital Museum

== See also ==
- List of township-level divisions of Beijing
