= Shilou, Beijing =

Shilou Town 石楼镇
- Town
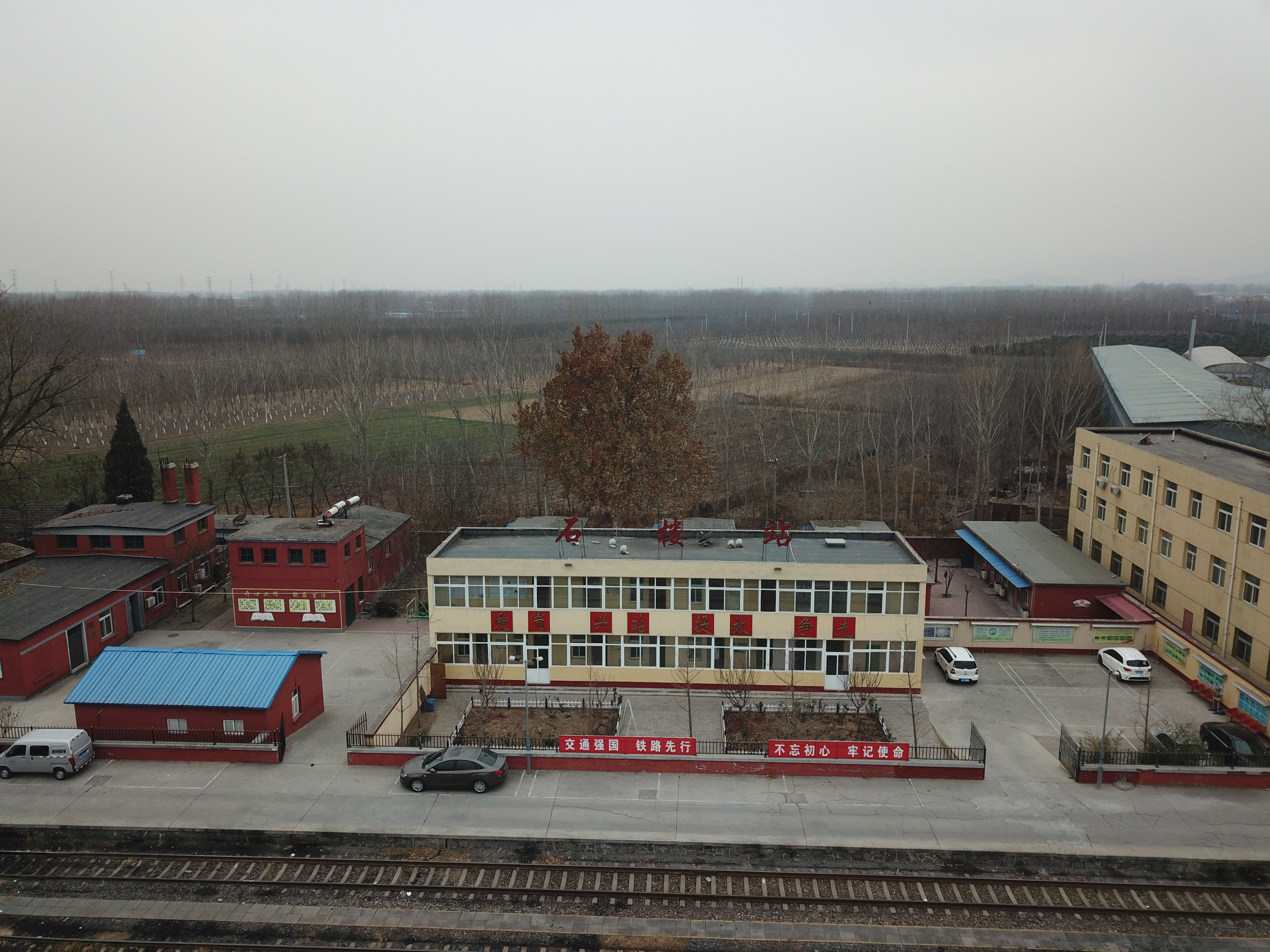
- Shilou Railway Station, 2018

- Location within Beijing Location within China
- Coordinates: 39°39′07″N 115°58′29″E
- Country: China
- Municipality: Beijing
- District: Fangshan
- Village-level Divisions: 1 community 12 villages

Area
  - Total: 42.2 km^{2} (16.3 sq mi)

Population (2020)
  - Total: 32,131
  - Density: 761/km^{2} (1,970/sq mi)
- Time zone: UTC+8 (China Standard)
- Postal code: 102422
- Area code: 010

Shilou Town (Chinese: 石楼镇; pinyin: Shílóu Zhèn) is a town located within Fangshan District, Beijing, China. It borders Chengguan Subdistrict in its north, Doudian Town in its east, Liulihe and Hancunhe Towns in its south, and Zhoukoudian Town in its northwest. As of 2020, it had 32,131 people residing under its administration.

== History ==
Timeline of Shilou Town's History
Year	Status
1916	Under the 2nd District of Fangshan County
1954	Created as Shilou Township
1958	Under Zhoukoudian District
1960	Transferred back to Fangshan County
1961	Changed into Shilou People's Commune
1983	Restored as a township
1986	Under Fangshan District
1989	Changed into a town

== Administrative divisions ==
In the year of 2021, Shilou Town was subdivided into 13 divisions, including 1 residential community and 12 villages:

Administrative division code	Subdivision names	Name transliteration	Type
110111104001	铁路	Tielu	Community
110111104200	吉羊	Jiyang	Village
110111104201	二站	Erzhan	Village
110111104202	石楼	Shilou	Village
110111104203	双孝	Shuangxiao	Village
110111104204	支楼	Zhilou	Village
110111104205	杨驸马庄	Yangfumazhuang	Village
110111104206	襄驸马庄	Xiangfumazhuang	Village
110111104207	大次洛	Daciluo	Village
110111104208	坨头	Tuotou	Village
110111104209	双柳树	Shuangliushu	Village
110111104210	梨园店	Liyuandian	Village
110111104211	夏村	Xiacun	Village

== See also ==
- List of township-level divisions of Beijing
