= Panggezhuang =

Panggezhuang 庞各庄镇
- Town
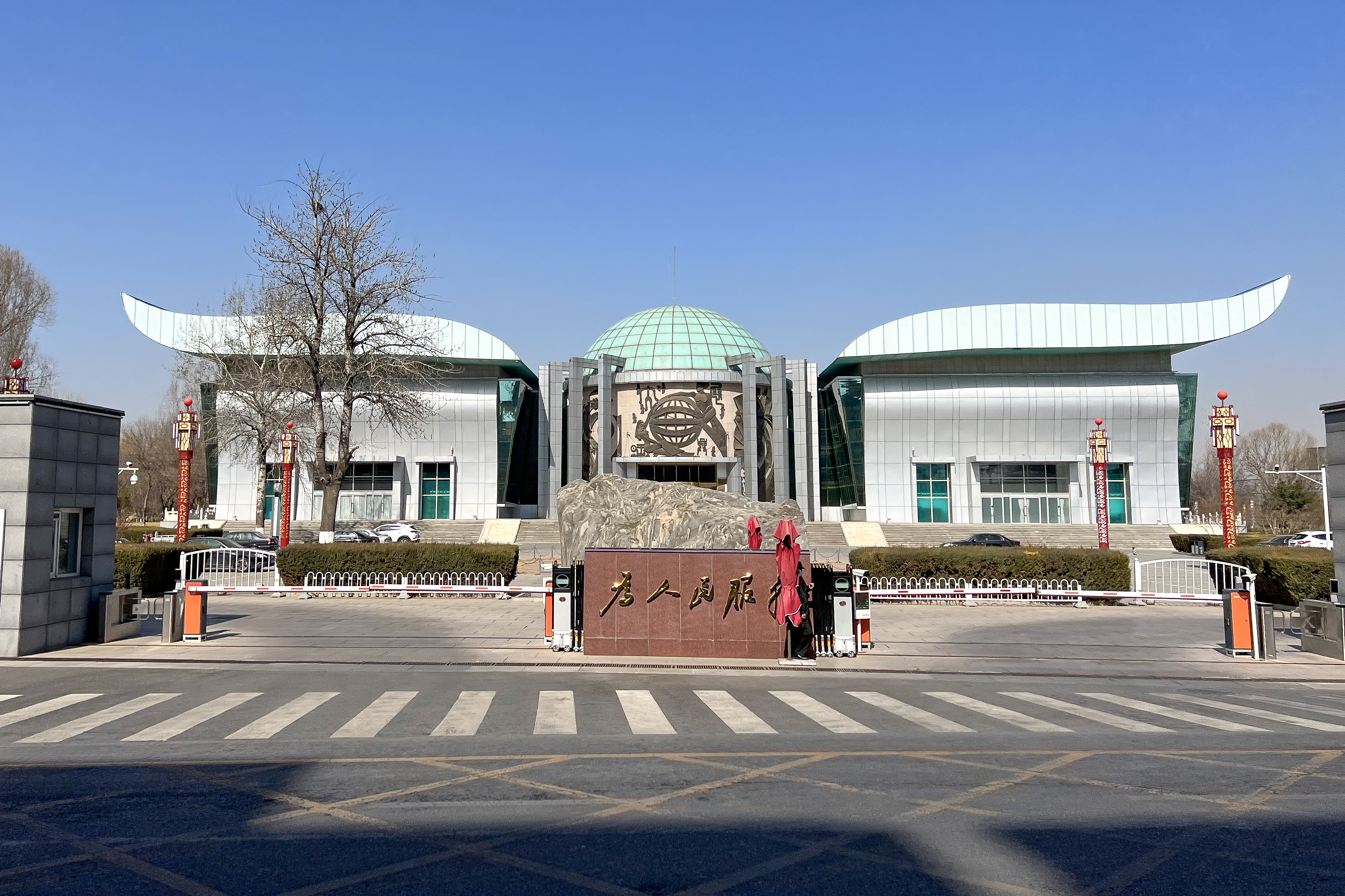
- China Watermelon Museum inside the government headquarters of Panggezhuang Town

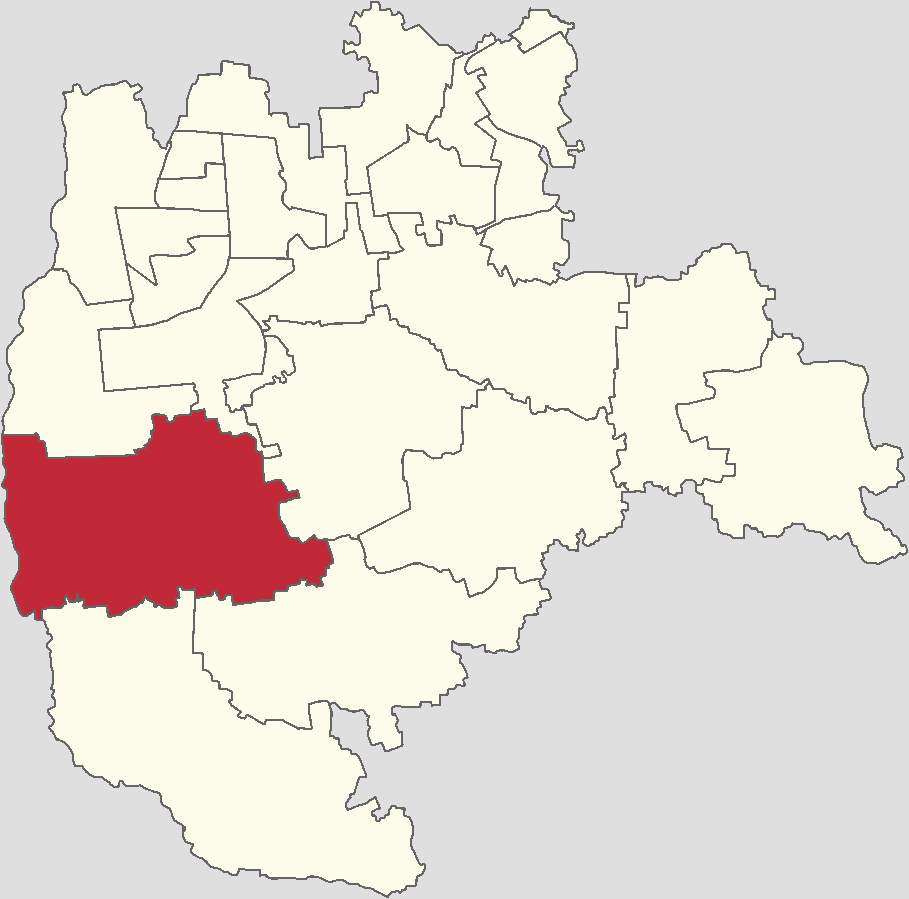
- Location in Daxing District

- Location within Beijing Location within China
- Coordinates: 39°38′01″N 116°19′04″E
- Country: China
- Municipality: Beijing
- District: Daxing
- Village-level Divisions: 6 communities 53 villages 1 development area

Area
  - Total: 109.6 km^{2} (42.3 sq mi)
- Elevation: 36 m (118 ft)

Population (2020)
  - Total: 74,912
  - Density: 683.5/km^{2} (1,770/sq mi)
- Time zone: UTC+8 (China Standard)
- Postal code: 102601
- Area code: 010

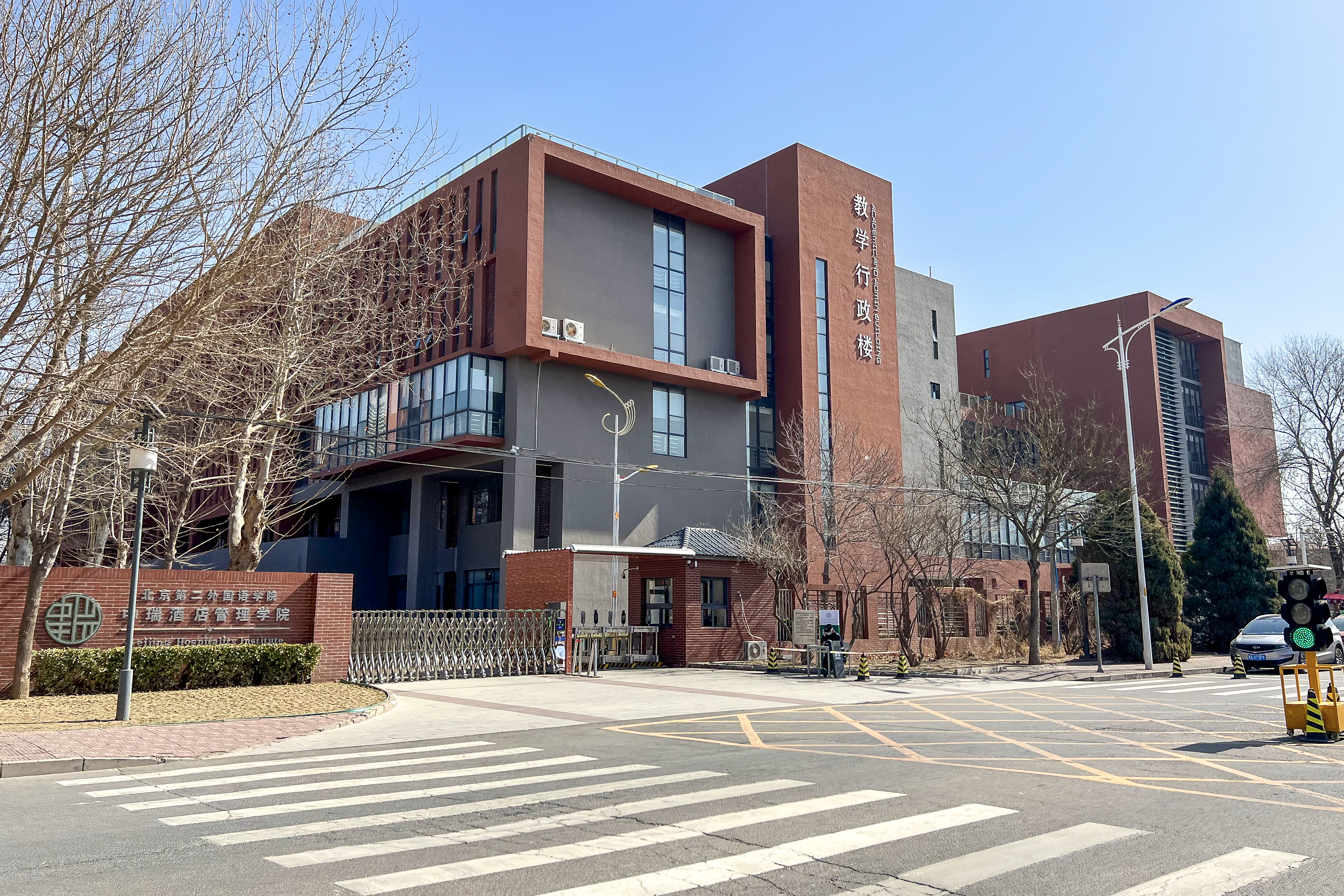
Beijing Hospitality Institute, a hotel management college in Panggezhuang

Panggezhuang Town (simplified Chinese: 庞各庄镇; traditional Chinese: 龐各莊鎮; pinyin: Pánggèzhuāng Zhèn) is a town in the western side of Daxing District, Beijing, China. It shares border with Beizangcun Town and Tiangongyuan Subdistrict to the north, Weishanzhuang Town to the east, Lixian and Yufa Towns to the south, Gongcun and Liulihe Towns to the west. In 2020, it had a population of 74,912.

This town's name Panggezhuang (Chinese: 庞各庄; lit. 'Pang Family Villa') is from the early settlers of this region who were from the Pang family.

== History ==
Timeline of Panggezhuang's History
Year	Status	Within
1950 - 1952	Panggezhuang District-Administered Town	Daxing County
1952 - 1958	Panggezhuang Township	Daxing County
1958 - 1961	Panggezhuang People's Commune	Daxing County
1961 - 1983	Panggezhuang People's Commune Dingfuzhuang People's Commune	Daxing County
1983 - 1990	Panggezhuang Township Dingfuzhuang Township	Daxing County
1990 - 2000	Panggezhuang Town Dingfuzhuang Township	Daxing County
2000 - 2001	Panggezhuang Town	Daxing County
2001–present	Panggezhuang Town	Daxing District

== Administrative divisions ==
So far in 2021, Panggezhuang Town was made up of 60 subdivisions, of those 6 were communities, 53 were villages, and 1 was a development area:

Administrative division code	Subdivision names	Name transliterations	Type
110115108001	御佳园	Yujiayuan	Community
110115108002	众美城	Zhongmeicheng	Community
110115108003	富力丹麦小镇	Fuli Danmai Xiaozhen	Community
110115108004	富力华庭苑	Fuli Huatingyuan	Community
110115108005	龙景湾	Longjingwan	Community
110115108006	丽水佳园	Lishui Jiayuan	Community
110115108200	李窑村	Liyao Cun	Village
110115108201	西中堡村	Xi Zhongbao Cun	Village
110115108202	东中堡村	Dong Zhongbao Cun	Village
110115108203	四各庄村	Sigezhuang Cun	Village
110115108204	小庄子村	Xiaozhuangzi Cun	Village
110115108205	幸福村	Xingfu Cun	Village
110115108206	团结村	Tuanjie Cun	Village
110115108207	繁荣村	Fanrong Cun	Village
110115108208	民生村	Minsheng Cun	Village
110115108209	北李渠村	Bei Liqu Cun	Village
110115108210	河南村	Henan Cun	Village
110115108211	宋各庄村	Songgezhuang Cun	Village
110115108212	南李渠村	Nan Liqu Cun	Village
110115108213	孙场村	Sunchang Cun	Village
110115108214	薛营村	Xueying Cun	Village
110115108215	西义堂村	Xi Yitang Cun	Village
110115108216	东义堂村	Dong Yitang Cun	Village
110115108217	南义堂村	Nan Yitang Cun	Village
110115108218	南园子村	Nan Yuanzi Cun	Village
110115108219	北顿垡村	Bei Dunfa Cun	Village
110115108220	张新庄村	Zhangxinzhuang Cun	Village
110115108221	南小营村	Nan Xiaoying Cun	Village
110115108222	西梨园村	Xi Liyuan Cun	Village
110115108223	东梨园村	Dong Liyuan Cun	Village
110115108224	李家巷村	Lijiaxiang Cun	Village
110115108225	王场村	Wangchang Cun	Village
110115108226	加录垡村	Jialufa Cun	Village
110115108227	南顿垡村	Nandunfa Cun	Village
110115108228	钥匙头村	Yaoshitou Cun	Village
110115108229	鲍家铺村	Baojiapu Cun	Village
110115108230	北章客村	Beizhangke Cun	Village
110115108231	留民庄村	Liuminzhuang Cun	Village
110115108232	西高各庄村	Xi Gaogezhuang Cun	Village
110115108233	东高各庄村	Dong Gaogezhuang Cun	Village
110115108234	保安庄村	Bao'anzhuang Cun	Village
110115108235	梁家务村	Liangjiawu Cun	Village
110115108236	田家窑村	Tianjiayao Cun	Village
110115108237	丁村	Dingcun	Village
110115108238	定福庄村	Dingfuzhuang Cun	Village
110115108239	西南次村	Xi Nanci Cun	Village
110115108240	东南次村	Dong Nanci Cun	Village
110115108241	张公垡村	Zhanggongfa Cun	Village
110115108242	赵村	Zhaocun	Village
110115108243	梨花村	Lihua Cun	Village
110115108244	福上村	Fushang Cun	Village
110115108245	东黑垡村	Dong Heifa Cun	Village
110115108246	西黑垡村	Xi Heifa Cun	Village
110115108247	常各庄村	Changgezhuang Cun	Village
110115108248	北曹各庄村	Bei Caogezhuang Cun	Village
110115108249	前曹各庄村	Qian Caogezhuang Cun	Village
110115108250	韩家铺村	Hanjiapu Cun	Village
110115108251	南章客村	Nan Zhangke Cun	Village
110115108252	南地村	Nandi Cun	Village
110115108401	庞各庄镇	Panggezhuangzhen	Development Area

== See also ==
- List of township-level divisions of Beijing
