= Changyang, Beijing =

Changyang Town 长阳镇
- Town
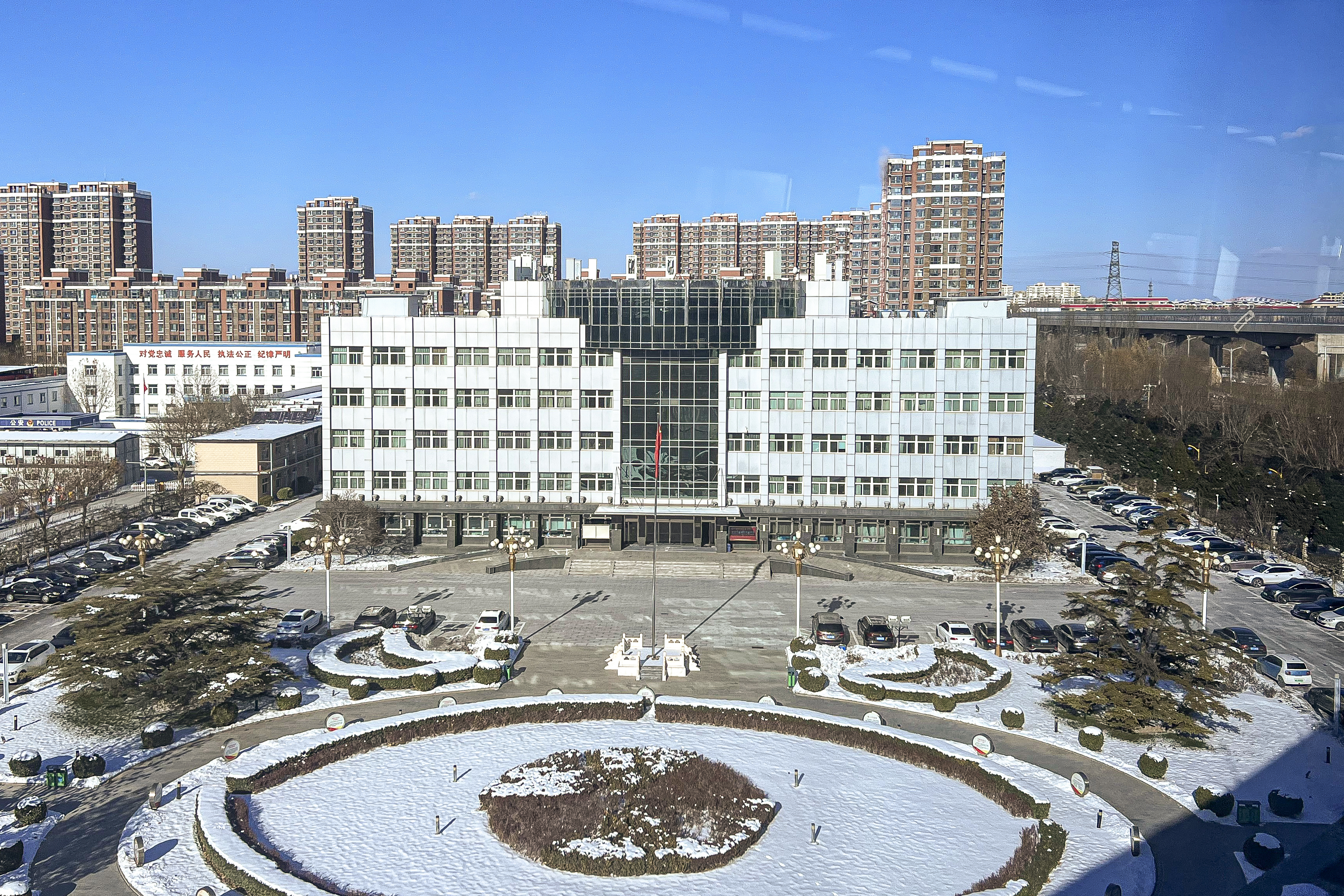
- Town hall of Changyang, 2023

- Location within Beijing Location within China
- Coordinates: 39°42′26″N 116°12′45″E
- Country: China
- Municipality: Beijing
- District: Fangshan
- Village-level Divisions: 54 communities 36 villages

Area
  - Total: 90.94 km^{2} (35.11 sq mi)

Population (2020)
  - Total: 241,691
  - Density: 2,658/km^{2} (6,883/sq mi)
- Time zone: UTC+8 (China Standard)
- Postal code: 102442
- Area code: 010

Changyang Town (Chinese: 长阳镇; pinyin: Chángyáng Zhèn) is a town on eastern Fangshan District, Beijing, China. It borders Fengtai District in its north, Huangcun and Beizangcun Towns in its east, Liulihe Town in its south, Doudian and Liangxiang Towns as well as Gongchen Subdistrict in its west. In the 2020 census, its total population was 241,691.

== History ==
History of Changyang Town
| Year | Status | |
|---|---|---|
| 1875 | Within Guangyangli | |
| 1916 | Within the 8th Northern District of Liangxiang County | |
| 1958 | Created as Changyang Farm within Beijing Bureau of Farmlands | |
| 1961 | Split into two, northern portion became Changyang People's Commune | Split into two, southern portion became Hulufa People's Commune |
| 1966 | Hulufa was added into Changyang People's Commune | |
| 1968 | Remained as Changyang People's Commune | Reinstated as Hulufa People's Commune |
| 1971 | Renamed to Sino-Cambodian Friendship People's Commone | Reinstated as Hulufa People's Commune |
| 1983 | Reorganized into Changyang Township | Reorganized into Hulufa Township |
| 1986 | Within Fangshan District | Remained as Hulufa Township |
| 1989 | Changed to Changyang Town | Remained as Hulufa Township |
| 2001 | Hulufa was added into Changyang Town | |

== Administrative Divisions ==
In the year 2021, Changyang Town had 89 subdivisions, of which 8 communities and 22 villages:

| Administrative division code | Subdivision names | Name transliteration | Type |
|---|---|---|---|
| 110111105001 | 长阳 | Changyang | Community |
| 110111105002 | 长龙苑 | Changlongyuan | Community |
| 110111105003 | 碧桂园 | Bijiayuan | Community |
| 110111105004 | 碧波园 | Biboyuan | Community |
| 110111105005 | 加州水郡东区 | Jiazhou Shuijun Dongqu | Community |
| 110111105006 | 大宁山庄 | Daning Shanzhuang | Community |
| 110111105007 | 徜徉集 | Changyangji | Community |
| 110111105008 | 嘉州水郡北区 | Jiazhou Shuijun Beiqu | Community |
| 110111105009 | 嘉州水郡南区 | Jiazhou Shuijun Nanqu | Community |
| 110111105010 | 天泰新景 | Tiantai Xinjing | Community |
| 110111105011 | 馨然嘉园 | Xinran Jiayuan | Community |
| 110111105012 | 建邦嘉园 | Jianbang Jiayuan | Community |
| 110111105013 | 悦都苑 | Yueduyuan | Community |
| 110111105014 | 半岛家园 | Bandao Jiayuan | Community |
| 110111105015 | 熙景嘉园 | Xijing Jiayuan | Community |
| 110111105016 | 朗悦嘉园 | Langyue Jiayuan | Community |
| 110111105017 | 云湾家园 | Yunwan Jiayuan | Community |
| 110111105018 | 熙兆嘉园 | Xizhao Jiayuan | Community |
| 110111105019 | 悦都新苑 | Yuedu Xinyuan | Community |
| 110111105020 | 悦然馨苑 | Yueran Xinyuan | Community |
| 110111105021 | 领峰四季园 | Lingfeng Sijiyuan | Community |
| 110111105022 | 溪雅苑 | Xiyayuan | Community |
| 110111105023 | 广悦居 | Guangyueju | Community |
| 110111105024 | 禾香雅园 | Hexiang Yayuan | Community |
| 110111105025 | 紫云家园 | Ziyun Jiayuan | Community |
| 110111105026 | 天瑞嘉园 | Tianrui Jiayuan | Community |
| 110111105027 | 碧桂园北区 | Biguiyuan Beiqu | Community |
| 110111105028 | 碧桂园南区 | Biguiyuan Nanqu | Community |
| 110111105029 | 畅和园 | Changheyuan | Community |
| 110111105030 | 稻香悦家园 | Daoxiang Yuejiayuan | Community |
| 110111105031 | 金域缇香家园 | Jinyu Tixiang Jiayuan | Community |
| 110111105032 | 康泽佳苑北区 | Kangze Jiayuan Beiqu | Community |
| 110111105033 | 康泽佳苑南区 | Kangze Jiayuan Nanqu | Community |
| 110111105034 | 铭品嘉苑 | Mingpin Jiayuan | Community |
| 110111105035 | 清苑嘉园 | Qingyuan Jiayuan | Community |
| 110111105036 | 上林佳苑联合 | Shanglin Jiayuan Lianhe | Community |
| 110111105037 | 天丰苑 | Tianfengyuan | Community |
| 110111105038 | 万和家园 | Wanhe Jiayuan | Community |
| 110111105039 | 新里程家园 | Xinlicheng Jiayuan | Community |
| 110111105040 | 燕保阜盛家园 | Yanbao Fusheng Jiayuan | Community |
| 110111105041 | 宜居园 | Yijuyuan | Community |
| 110111105042 | 原香小镇 | Yuanxiang Xiaozhen | Community |
| 110111105043 | 长景新园 | Changjing Xinyuan | Community |
| 110111105044 | 长龙家园 | Changlong Jiayuan | Community |
| 110111105045 | 半岛家园南区 | Bandao Jiayuan Nanqu | Community |
| 110111105046 | 碧岸澜庭 | Bi'an Lanting | Community |
| 110111105047 | 康泽佳苑南区二里 | Kangze Jiayuan Nanqu Erli | Community |
| 110111105048 | 康泽佳苑南区一里 | Kangze Jiayuan Nanqu Yili | Community |
| 110111105049 | 西悦居 | Xiyueju | Community |
| 110111105050 | 馨然嘉园北区 | Xinran Jiayuan Beiqu | Community |
| 110111105051 | 杨庄子 | Yangzhuangzi | Community |
| 110111105052 | 张家场 | Zhangjiachang | Community |
| 110111105053 | 长景新园北区 | Changjing Xinyuan Beiqu | Community |
| 110111105054 | 紫云家园东区 | Ziyun Jiayuan Dongqu | Community |
| 110111105200 | 长阳一 | Changyang Yi | Village |
| 110111105201 | 长阳二 | Changyang Er | Village |
| 110111105204 | 黄管屯 | Huangguantun | Village |
| 110111105205 | 哑叭河 | Yabahe | Village |
| 110111105209 | 北广阳城 | Bei Guangyangcheng | Village |
| 110111105210 | 水碾屯一 | Shuiniantun Yi | Village |
| 110111105211 | 水碾屯二 | Shuiniantun Er | Village |
| 110111105212 | 军留庄 | Junliuzhuang | Village |
| 110111105213 | 张家场 | Zhangjiachang | Village |
| 110111105214 | 牛家场 | Niujiachang | Village |
| 110111105215 | 保合庄 | Baohezhuang | Village |
| 110111105216 | 杨庄子 | Yangzhuangzi | Village |
| 110111105217 | 长营 | Changying | Village |
| 110111105218 | 马厂 | Machang | Village |
| 110111105219 | 高岭 | Gaoling | Village |
| 110111105220 | 稻田一 | Daotian Yi | Village |
| 110111105221 | 稻田二 | Daotian Er | Village |
| 110111105222 | 稻田三 | Daotian San | Village |
| 110111105223 | 稻田四 | Daotian Si | Village |
| 110111105224 | 稻田五 | Daotian Wu | Village |
| 110111105225 | 高佃一 | Gaodian Yi | Village |
| 110111105226 | 高佃二 | Gaodian Er | Village |
| 110111105227 | 高佃三 | Gaodian San | Village |
| 110111105228 | 高佃四 | Gaodian Si | Village |
| 110111105229 | 大宁 | Daning | Village |
| 110111105230 | 温庄子 | Wenzhuangzi | Village |
| 110111105231 | 独义 | Duyi | Village |
| 110111105232 | 朱岗子 | Zhugangzi | Village |
| 110111105233 | 阎仙垡 | Yanxianfa | Village |
| 110111105234 | 葫芦垡 | Hulufa | Village |
| 110111105235 | 夏场 | Xiachang | Village |
| 110111105236 | 佛满 | Foman | Village |
| 110111105237 | 赵庄 | Zhaozhuang | Village |
| 110111105238 | 公议庄 | Gongyizhuang | Village |
| 110111105239 | 西场 | Xichang | Village |
| 110111105240 | 篱笆房村 | Libafang Cun | Village |

== See also ==
- List of township-level divisions of Beijing
