= Tiangongyuan Subdistrict =

Tiangongyuan Subdistrict 天宫院街道
- Subdistrict
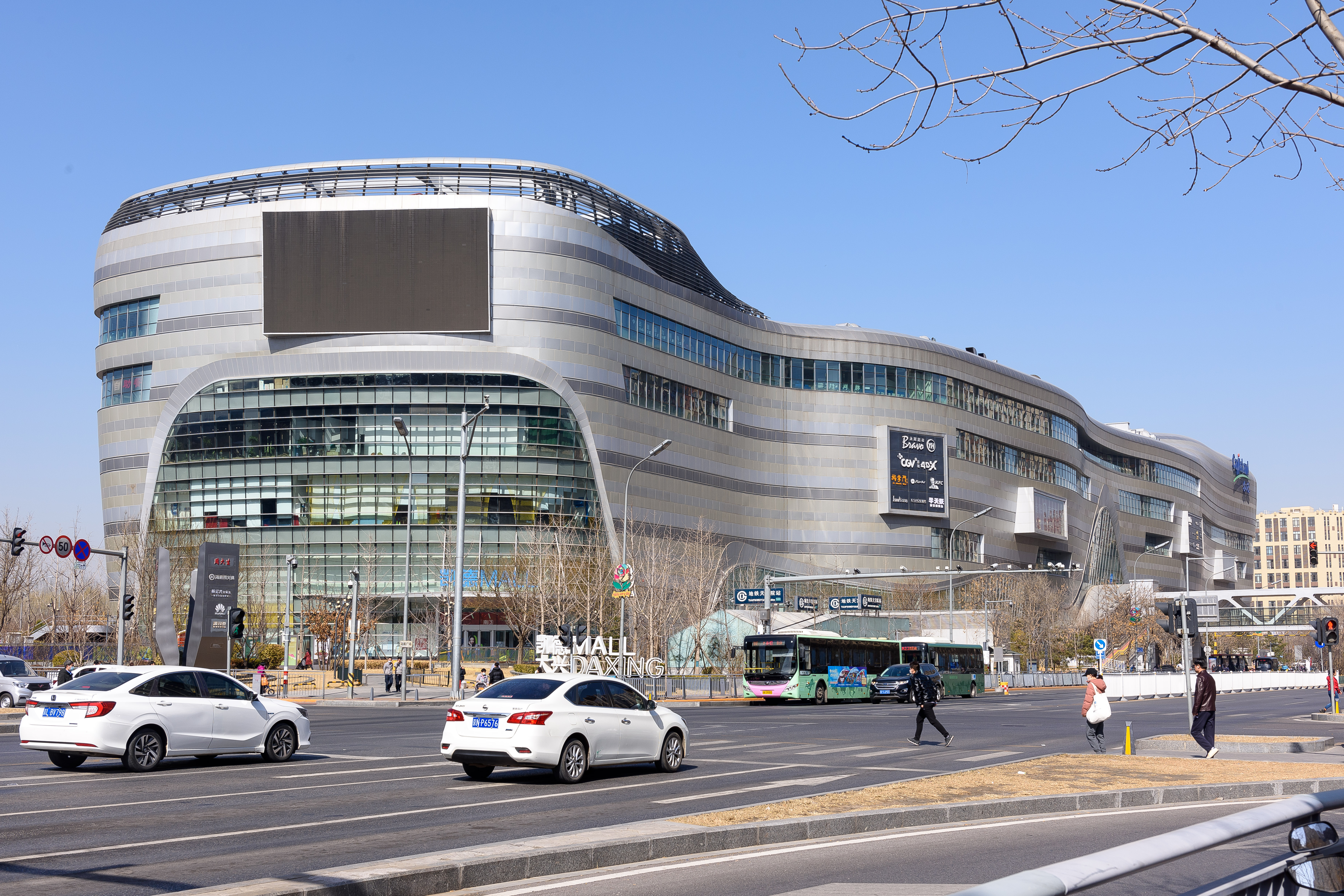
- CapitaMall Daxing within the subdistrict

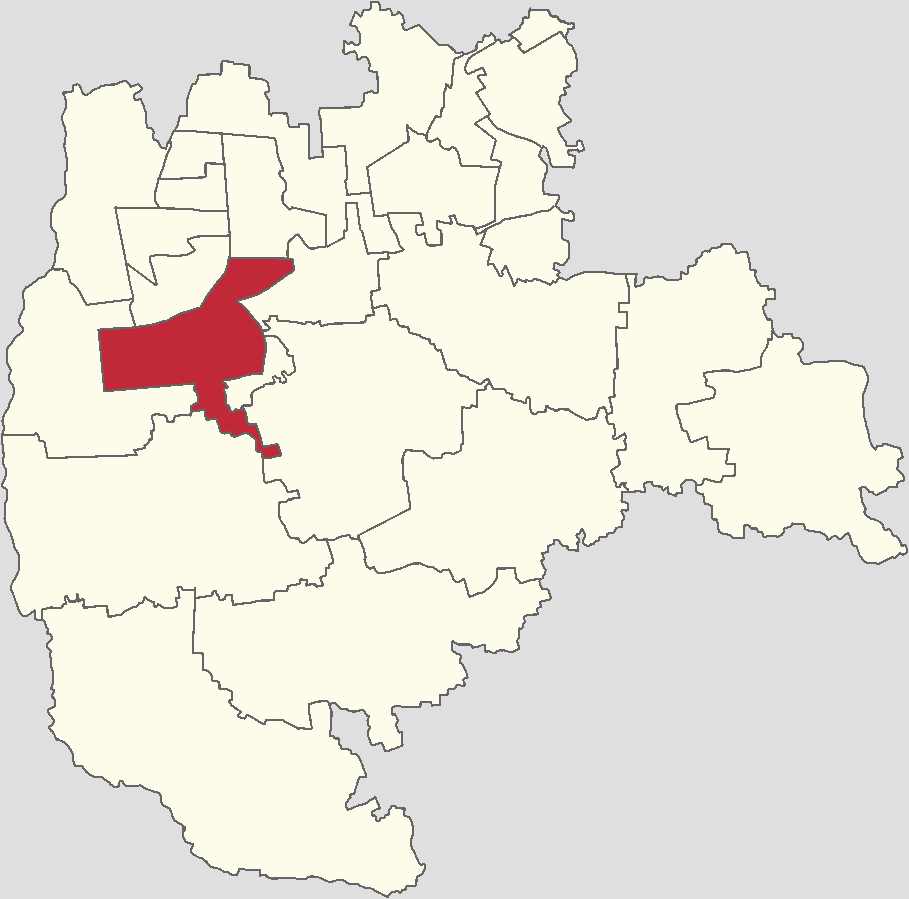
- Location within Daxing District

- Location within Beijing Location within China
- Coordinates: 39°41′39″N 116°19′29″E
- Country: China
- Municipality: Beijing
- District: Daxing
- Village-level Divisions: 18 communities

Area
  - Total: 23.93 km^{2} (9.24 sq mi)
- Elevation: 41 m (135 ft)

Population (2020)
  - Total: 87,415
  - Density: 3,653/km^{2} (9,461/sq mi)
- Time zone: UTC+8 (China Standard)
- Postal code: 102629
- Area code: 010

Tiangongyuan Subdistrict (simplified Chinese: 天宫院街道; traditional Chinese: 天宮院街道; pinyin: Tiāngōngyuàn Jiēdào) is a subdistrict situated in the northwestern portion of Daxing District, Beijing, China. It borders Linxiao Road and Guanyinsi Subdistricts to its north, Huangcun and Weishanzhuang Towns to its east, Lugezhuang Town to its south, and Beizangcun Town to its west. As of 2020, the census had counted 87,415 residents within the subdistrict.

This region used to be Shijiazhuang Village. According to Wanshu Zaji, Emperor Zhangzong of Jin stayed within the village during his hunting trip, and since then the area was renamed to Tiangongyuan (Chinese: 天宫院; lit. 'Heavenly Palace Yard'). The subdistrict had been part of Beizangcun Town for decades, and was formally created in 2009.

== Administrative divisions ==
In 2021, Tiangongyuan Subdistrict is formed from 18 communities. They are listed below:

Administrative division code	Subdivision names	Name transliteration
110115010001	海子角	Haizijiao
110115010002	天堂河	Tiantanghe
110115010003	海子角东里	Haizijiao Dongli
110115010004	海子角南里	Haizijiao Nanli
110115010005	海子角西里	Haizijiao Xili
110115010006	海子角北里	Haizijiao Beili
110115010007	矿林庄	Kuanglinzhuang
110115010008	天宫院	Tiangongyuan
110115010009	兴宇	Xingyu
110115010010	融汇	Ronghui
110115010011	新源时代	Xinyuan Shidai
110115010012	天宫院中里	Tiangongyuan Zhongli
110115010013	天宫院西里	Tiangongyuan Xili
110115010014	新源时代西里	Xinyuan Shidai Xili
110115010015	新源时代中里	Xinyuan Shidai Zhongli
110115010016	天宫院南里	Tiangongyuan Nanli
110115010017	天宫院北里	Tiangongyuan Beili
110115010018	兴宇西里	Xingyu XIli

== Transport ==
- Tiangong Yuan station

== See also ==
- List of township-level divisions of Beijing
