= Xingcheng station (Beijing Subway) =

Beijing Subway station

Xingcheng 星城
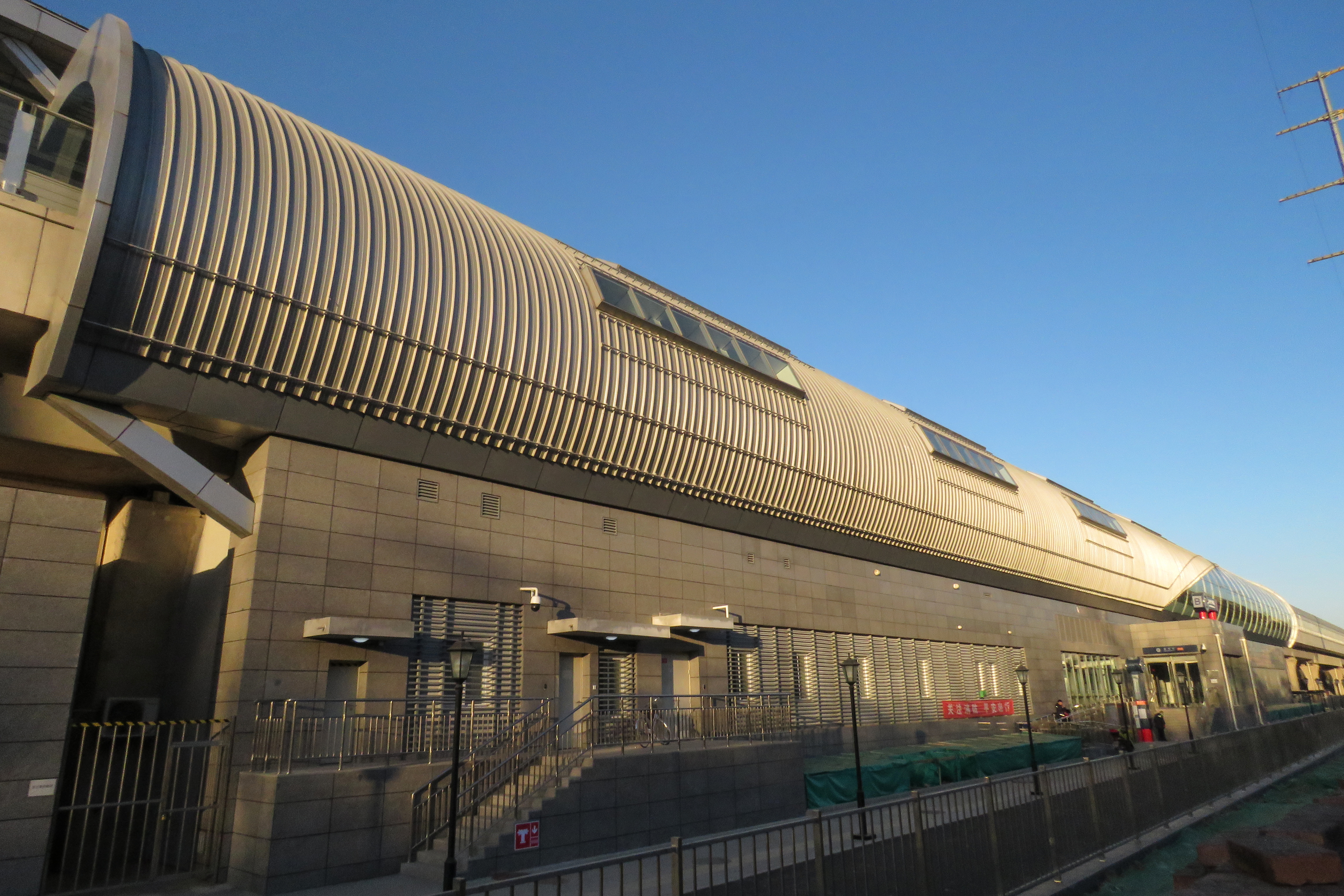
- Exterior

General information
- Location: Jingzhou Road (京周路) and Dadou Road (大窦路); Xingcheng Subdistrict, Fangshan District, Beijing; China
- Coordinates: 39°42′49″N 116°03′41″E
- Operator: Beijing Metro Operation Administration (BJMOA) Corp., Ltd.
- Line: Yanfang line
- Platforms: 2 (1 island platform)
- Tracks: 2

Construction
- Structure type: Elevated
- Accessible: Yes

History
- Opened: 30 December 2017

Services
| Preceding station | Beijing Subway | Following station |
|---|---|---|
| Yancun towards Yancundong | Yanfang line | Dashihedong towards Yanshan |
Location
- Location within Beijing

Xingcheng station (Chinese: 星城站; pinyin: Xīngchéng Zhàn) is a station on Yanfang Line of the Beijing Subway. It was opened on 30 December 2017.

== Station layout ==
The station has an elevated island platform.

== Exits ==
The station has 2 exits, lettered A and B. Both exits are accessible.

== Gallery ==
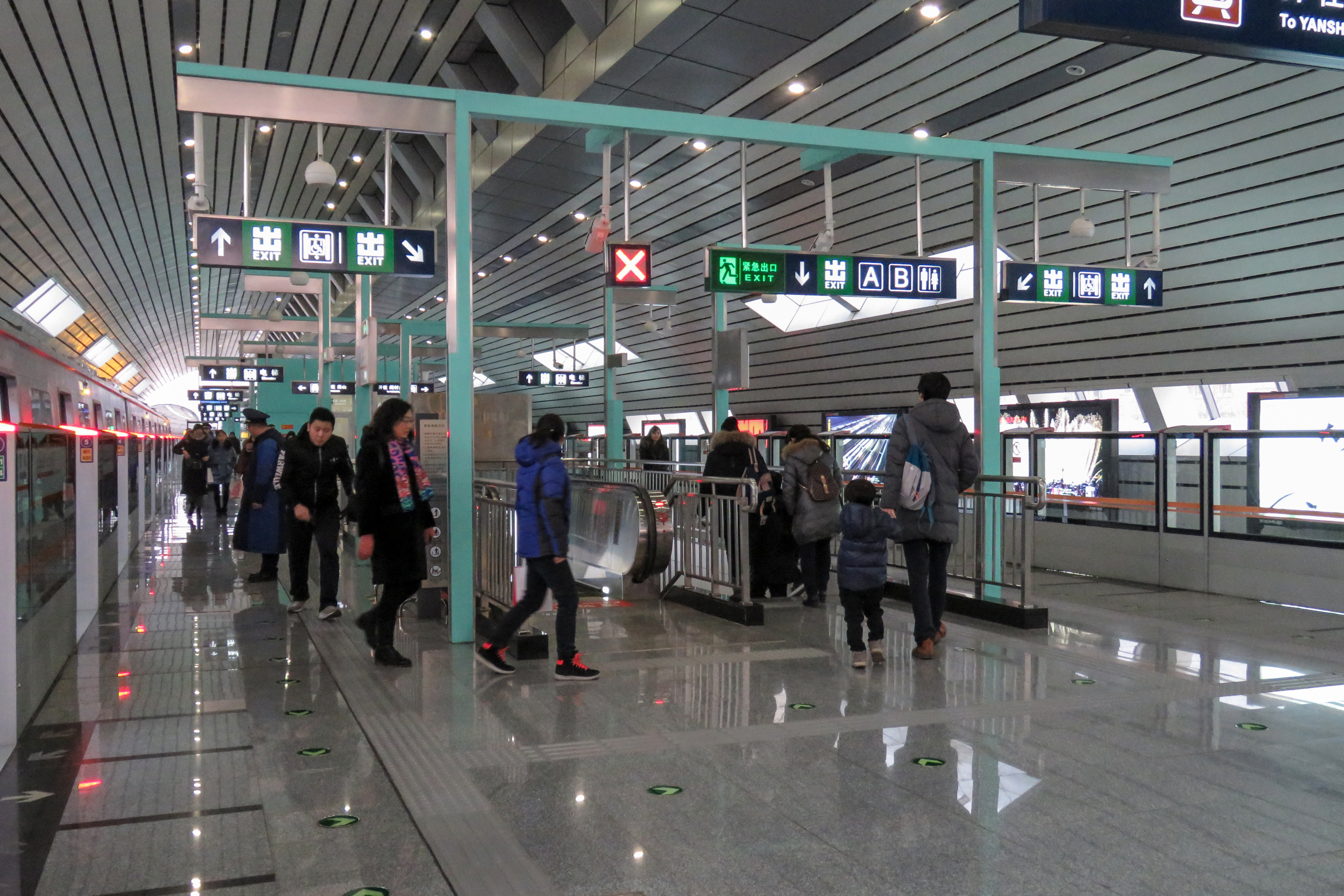
Platform
