= Raolefu station =

Beijing Subway station

Raole Fu 饶乐府
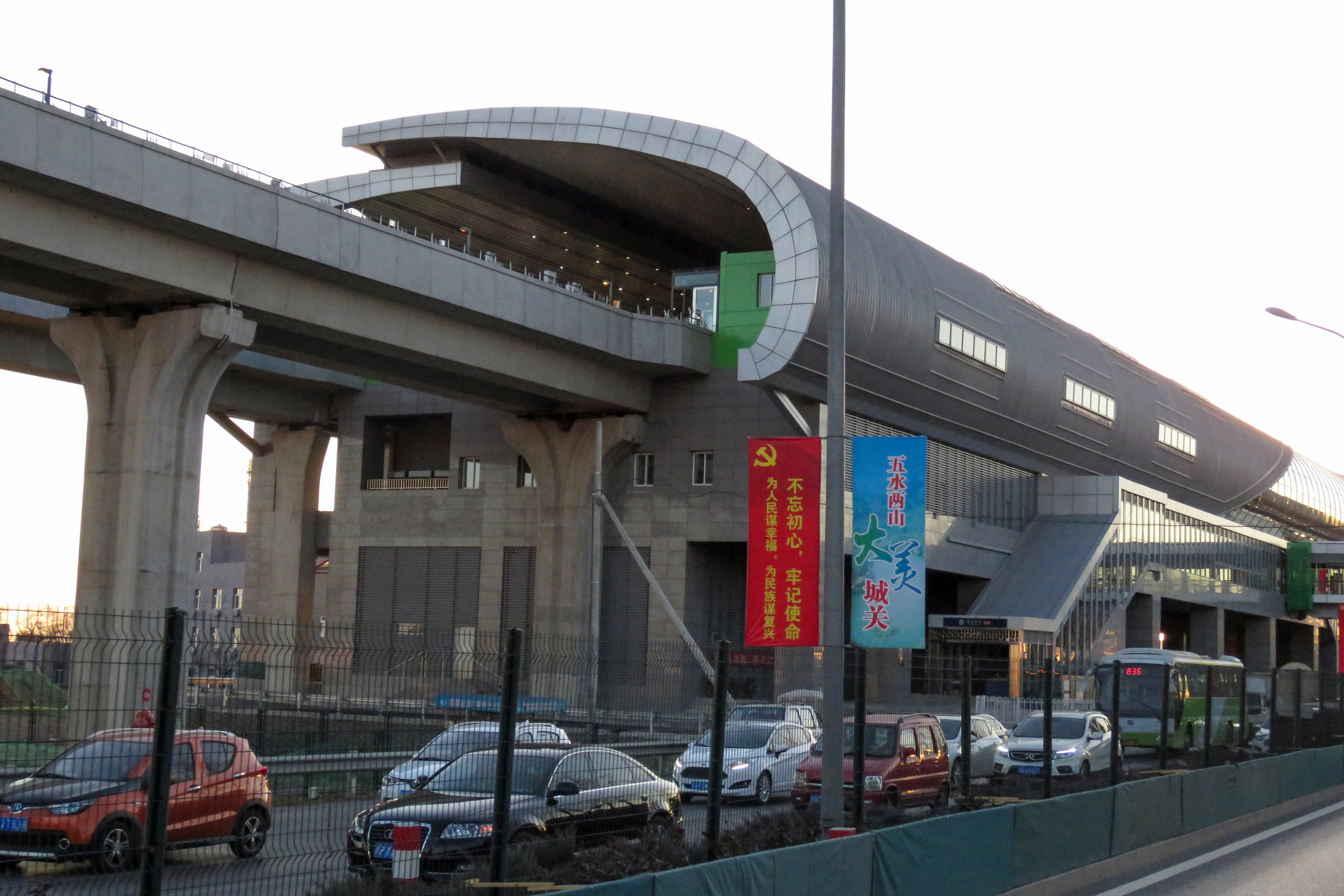
- Exterior

General information
- Location: Jingzhou Road (京周路); Raolefu, Chengguan Subdistrict, Fangshan District, Beijing; China
- Coordinates: 39°42′05″N 116°00′22″E
- Operator: Beijing Metro Operation Administration (BJMOA) Corp., Ltd.
- Line: Yanfang line
- Platforms: 3 (1 island platform and 1 side platform)
- Tracks: 2

Construction
- Structure type: Elevated
- Accessible: Yes

History
- Opened: December 30, 2017; 8 years ago

Services
Preceding station	Beijing Subway	Following station
Magezhuang towards Yancundong	Yanfang line	Fangshan Chengguan towards Yanshan
Location
- Location within Beijing

Raole Fu station (simplified Chinese: 饶乐府站; traditional Chinese: 饒樂府站; pinyin: Ráolèfǔ Zhàn) is a station on Yanfang Line of the Beijing Subway. It was opened on 30 December 2017.

== Station layout ==
The station has 1 elevated island platform and 1 elevated side platform. Only the inner platform of the island platform is in service, with the outer platform currently out of use.

== Exits ==
There are 2 exits, lettered A and B. Exit B is accessible.

== Gallery ==
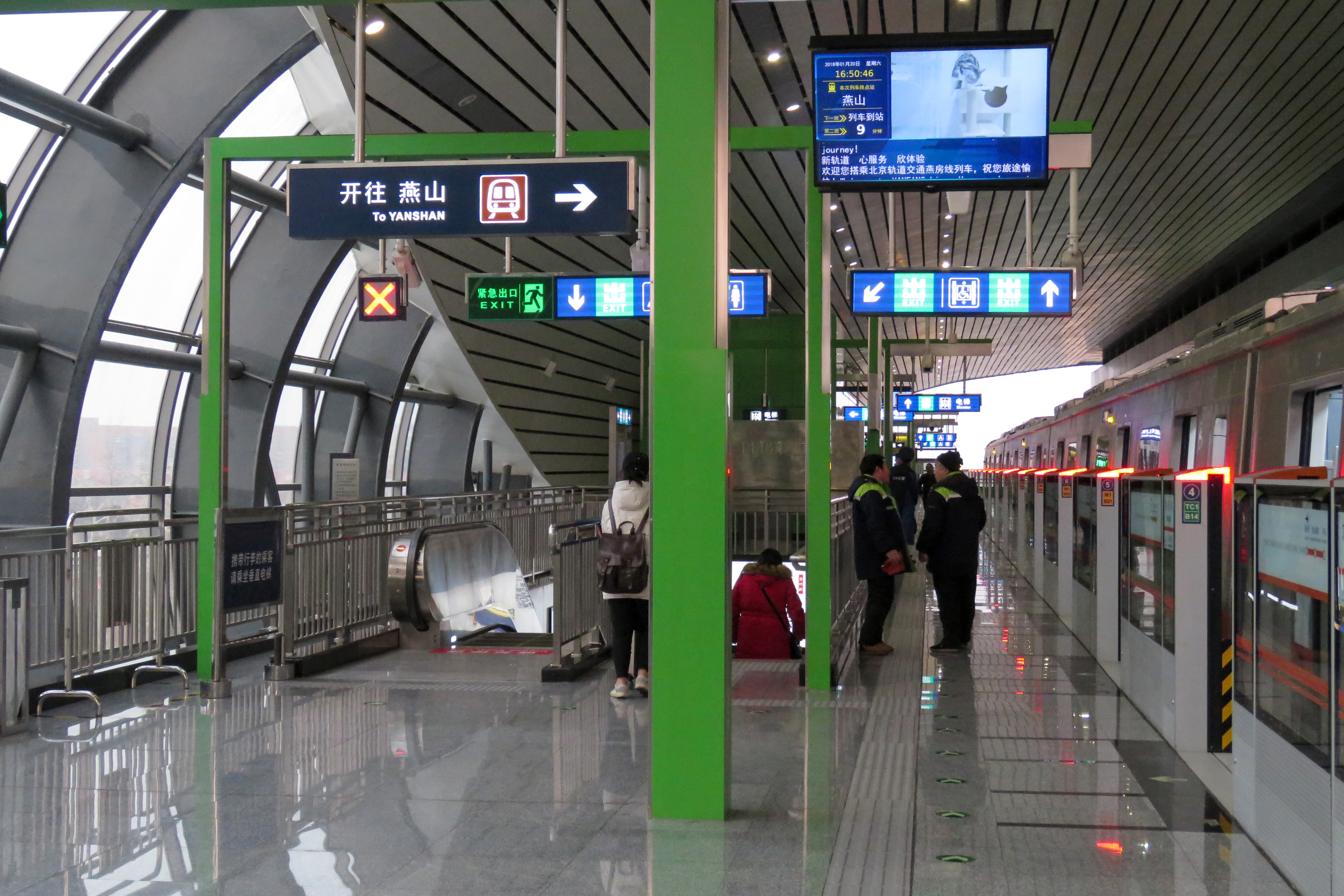
Platform
