= Magezhuang station =

Beijing Subway station

Magezhuang 马各庄
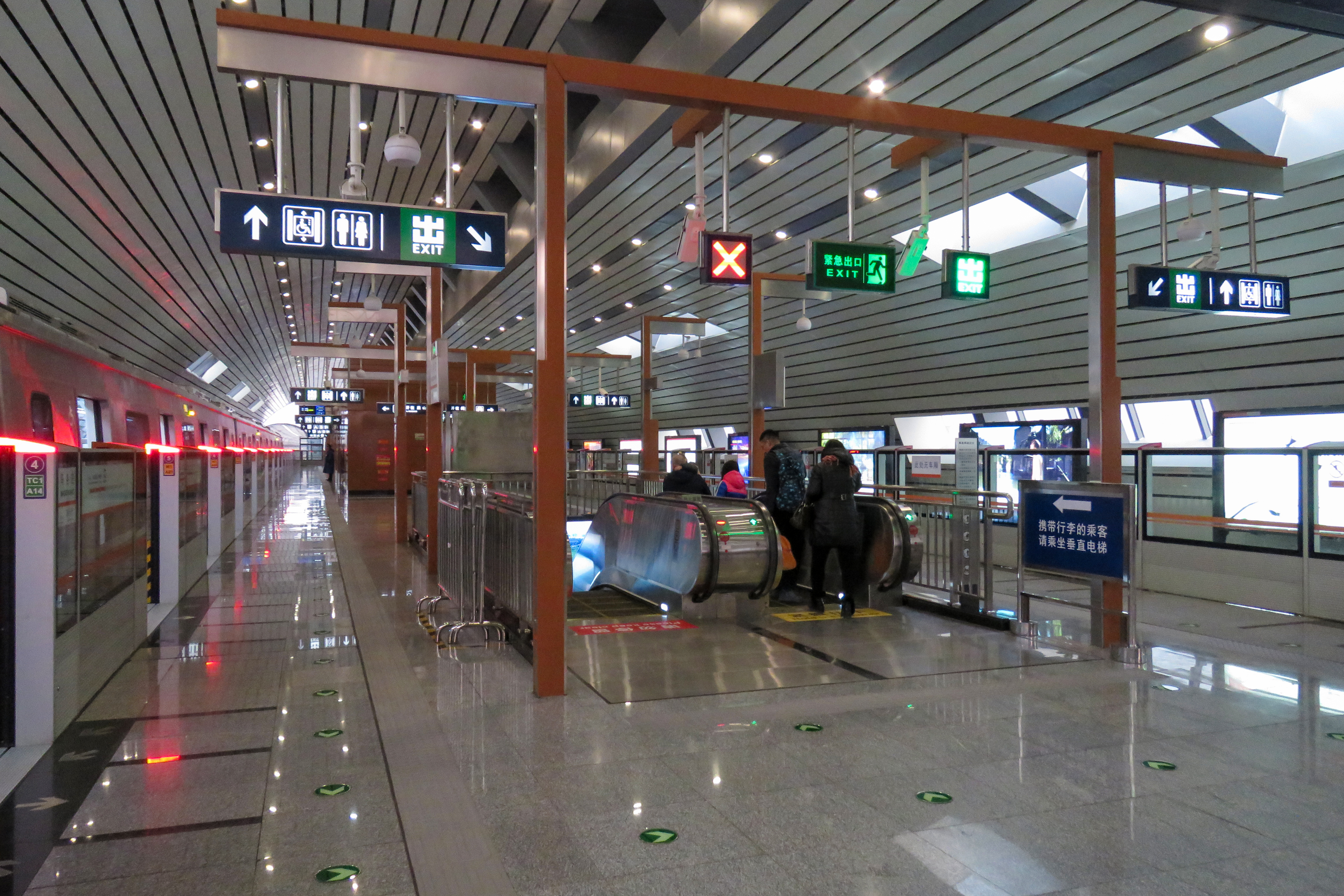
- Platform

General information
- Location: Jingzhou Road (京周路) and Guba Road (顾八路); Fangshan District, Beijing; China
- Coordinates: 39°42′18″N 116°01′00″E
- Operator: Beijing Metro Operation Administration (BJMOA) Corp., Ltd.
- Line: Yanfang line
- Platforms: 2 (1 island platform)
- Tracks: 2

Construction
- Structure type: Elevated
- Accessible: Yes

History
- Opened: 30 December 2017; 8 years ago

Services
Preceding station	Beijing Subway	Following station
Dashihedong towards Yancundong	Yanfang line	Raole Fu towards Yanshan
Location
- Location within Beijing

Magezhuang station (simplified Chinese: 马各庄站; traditional Chinese: 馬各莊站; pinyin: Mǎgèzhuāng Zhàn) is a station on Yanfang Line of the Beijing Subway. It was opened on 30 December 2017.

== Station layout ==
The station has an elevated island platform.

== Exits ==
There are 2 exits, lettered A and B. Exit B is accessible.
