= Yancun station =

Beijing Subway station

Yancun 阎村
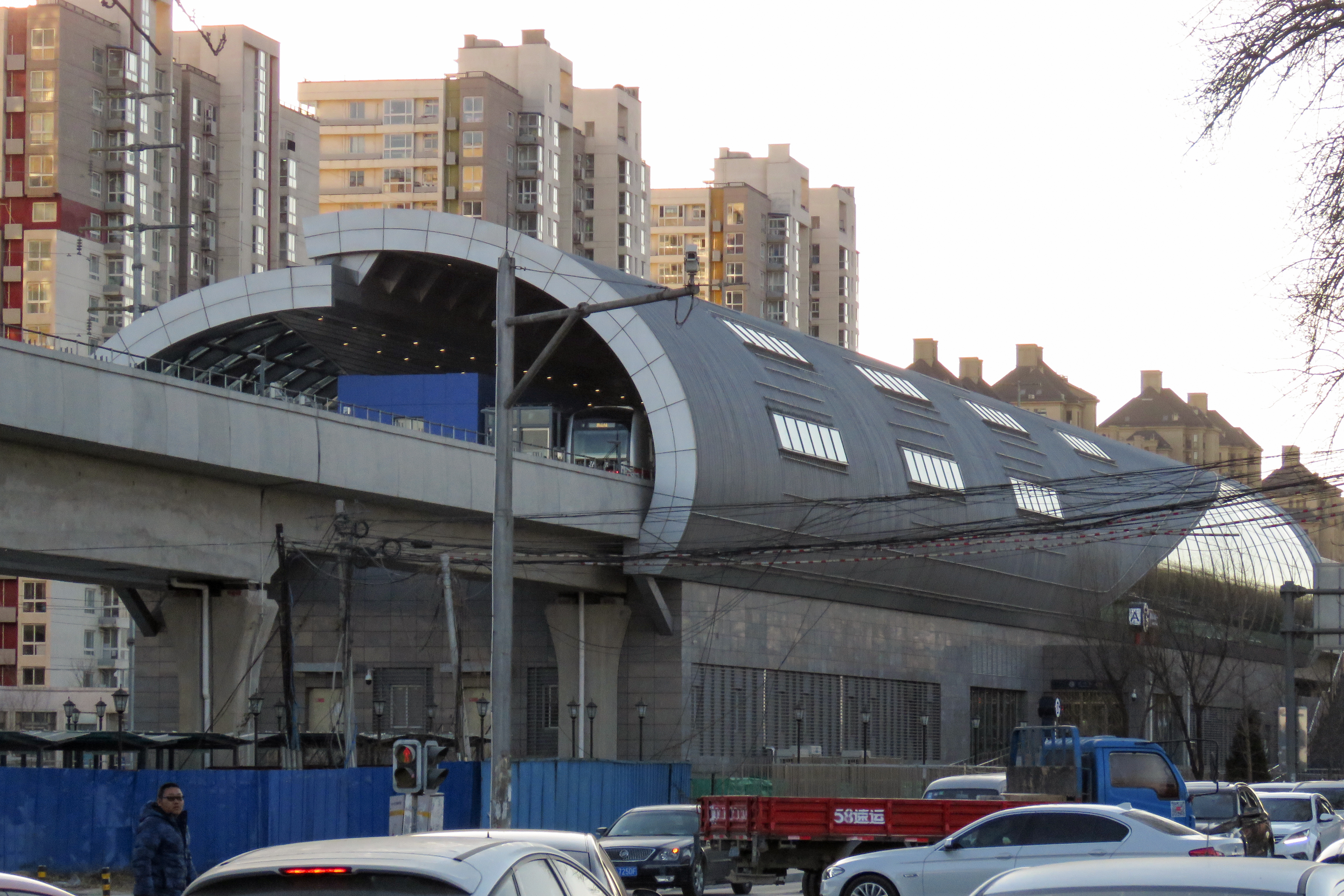
- Exterior

General information
- Location: Jingzhou Road (京周路) and Zima Road (紫码路); Fangshan District, Beijing; China
- Coordinates: 39°43′00″N 116°04′49″E
- Operator: Beijing Metro Operation Administration (BJMOA) Corp., Ltd.
- Line: Yanfang line
- Platforms: 2 (1 island platform)
- Tracks: 2

Construction
- Structure type: Elevated
- Accessible: Yes

History
- Opened: 30 December 2017

Services
Preceding station	Beijing Subway	Following station
Zicaowu towards Yancundong	Yanfang line	Xingcheng towards Yanshan
Location
- Location within Beijing

Yancun station (simplified Chinese: 阎村站; traditional Chinese: 閻村站; pinyin: Yáncūn Zhàn) is a station on Yanfang Line of the Beijing Subway. It was opened on 30 December 2017.

== Station layout ==
The station has an elevated island platform.

== Exits ==
There are 2 exits, lettered A and B. Both exits are accessible.

== Gallery ==
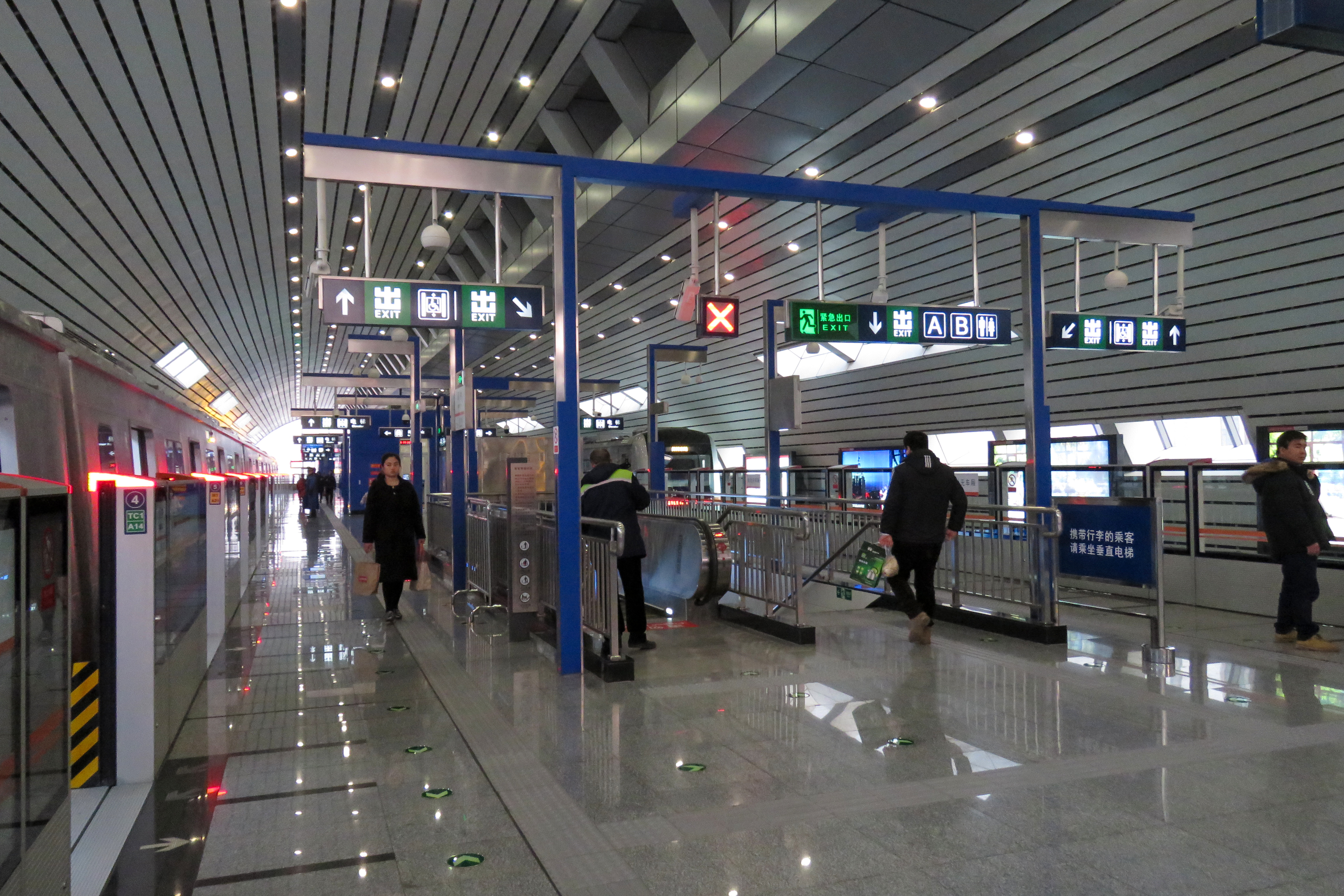
Platform
