= Dashihedong station =

Beijing Subway station

Dashihedong 大石河东
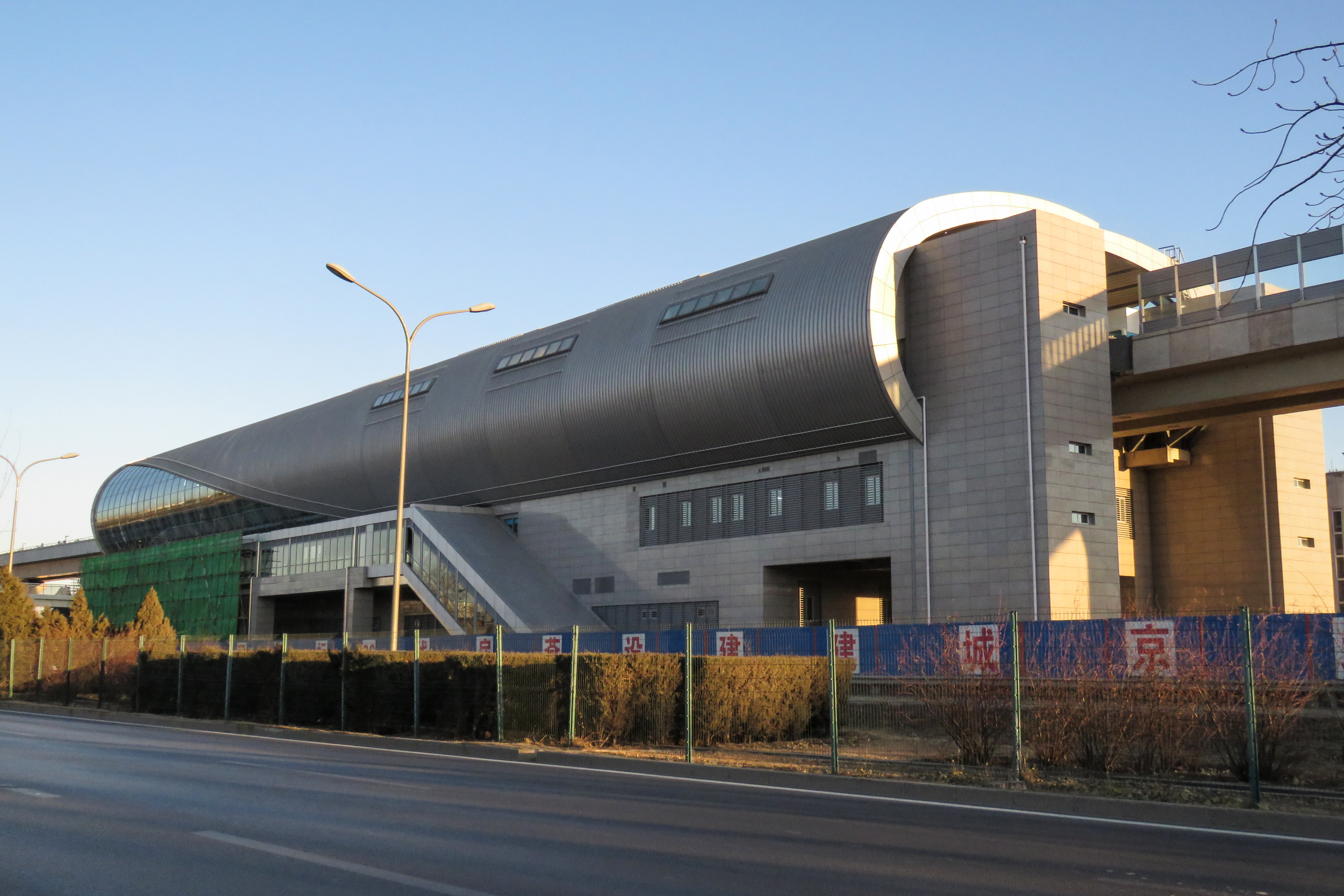
- Exterior

General information
- Location: Jingzhou Road (京周路) east of G5 Beijing–Kunming Expressway; Fangshan District, Beijing; China
- Coordinates: 39°42′36″N 116°02′24″E
- Operator: Beijing Metro Operation Administration (BJMOA) Corp., Ltd.
- Line: Yanfang line
- Platforms: 2 (1 island platform)
- Tracks: 2

Construction
- Structure type: Elevated
- Accessible: Yes

History
- Opened: December 30, 2017

Services
Preceding station	Beijing Subway	Following station
Xingcheng towards Yancundong	Yanfang line	Magezhuang towards Yanshan
Location
- Location within Beijing

Dashihedong station (simplified Chinese: 大石河东站; traditional Chinese: 大石河東站; pinyin: Dàshíhé Dōng Zhàn) is a station on Yanfang Line of the Beijing Subway. It was opened on 30 December 2017.

== Station layout ==
The station has 2 elevated side platforms.

== Exits ==
There are 3 exits, lettered A1, A2, and B. Exit B is accessible.

== Gallery ==
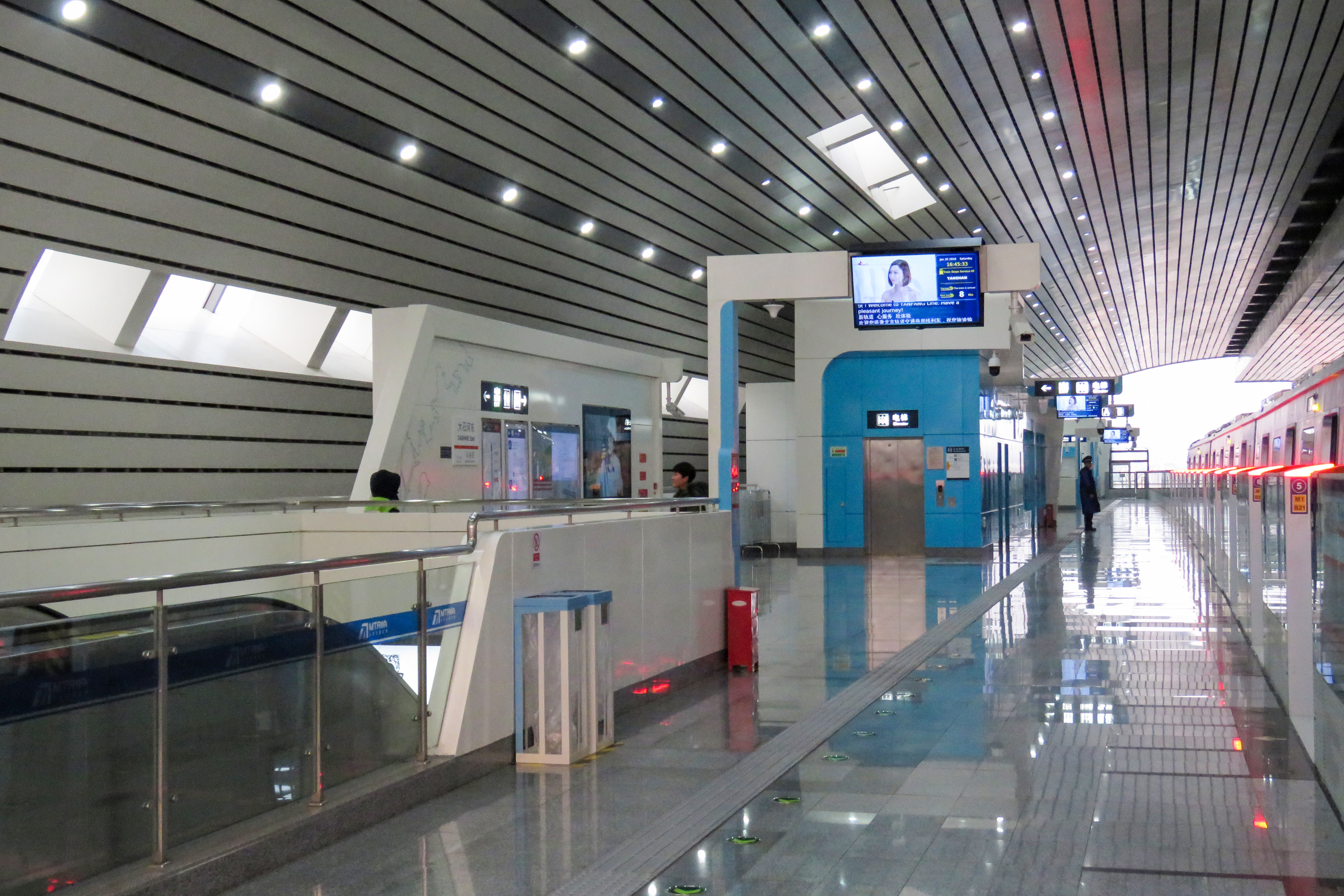
Westbound Platform
