= Fangshan Chengguan station =

Beijing Subway station

Fangshan Chengguan 房山城关
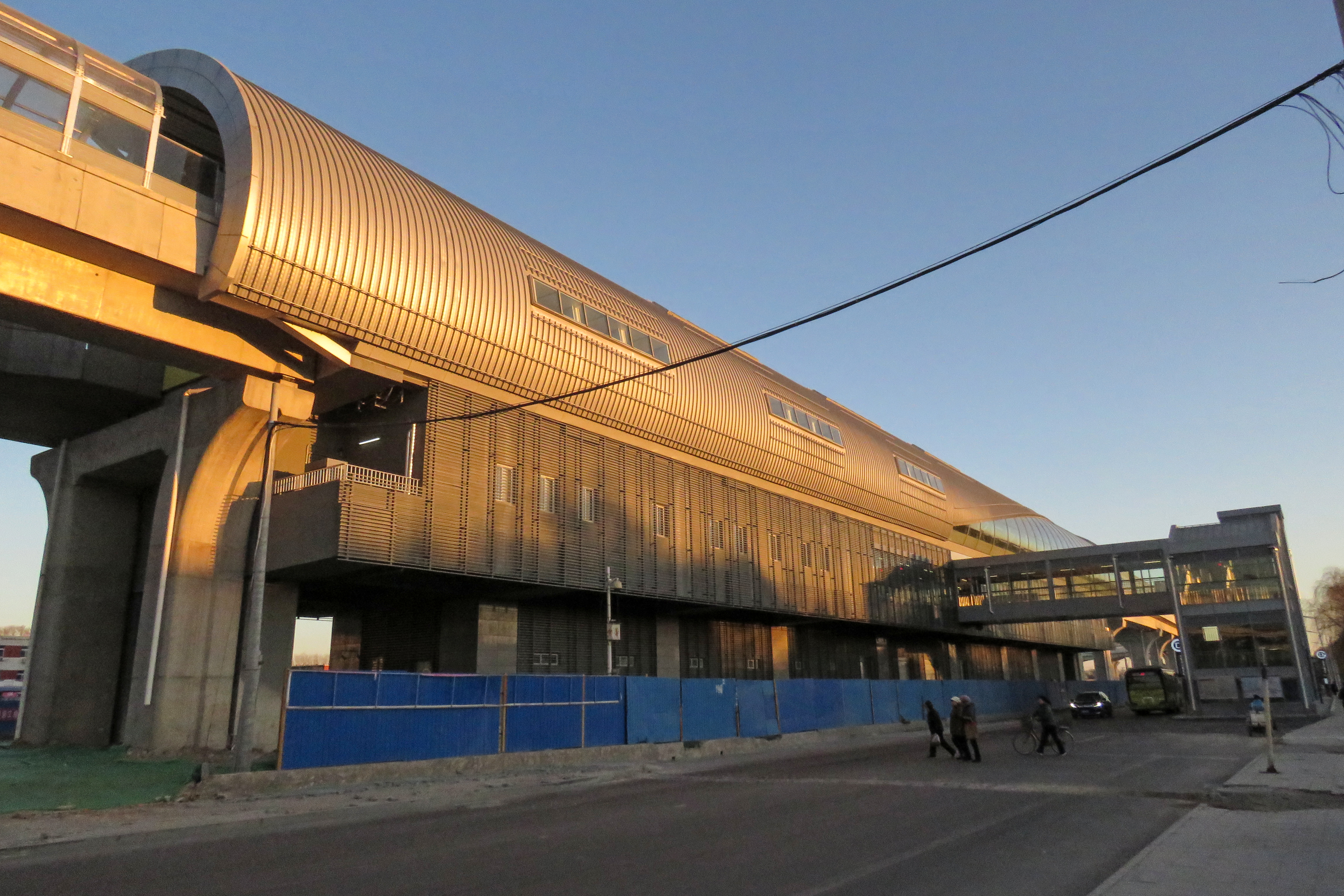
- Exterior

General information
- Location: Yanfang Road (燕房路) and Fangshanzhan Road (房山站路); Chengguan Subdistrict, Fangshan District, Beijing; China
- Coordinates: 39°42′22″N 115°59′23″E
- Operator: Beijing Metro Operation Administration (BJMOA) Corp., Ltd.
- Line: Yanfang line
- Platforms: 2 (1 island platform)
- Tracks: 2

Construction
- Structure type: Elevated
- Accessible: Yes

History
- Opened: December 30, 2017; 8 years ago

Services
Preceding station	Beijing Subway	Following station
Raole Fu towards Yancundong	Yanfang line	Yanshan Terminus
Location
- Location within Beijing

Fangshan Chengguan station (simplified Chinese: 房山城关站; traditional Chinese: 房山城關站; pinyin: Fángshān Chéngguān Zhàn) is a station on the Yanfang Line of the Beijing Subway. It was opened on 30 December 2017.

== Station layout ==
The station has an elevated island platform.

== Exits ==
There are 4 exits, lettered A1, A2, B1, and B2. Exits A1 and B2 are accessible.

== Gallery ==
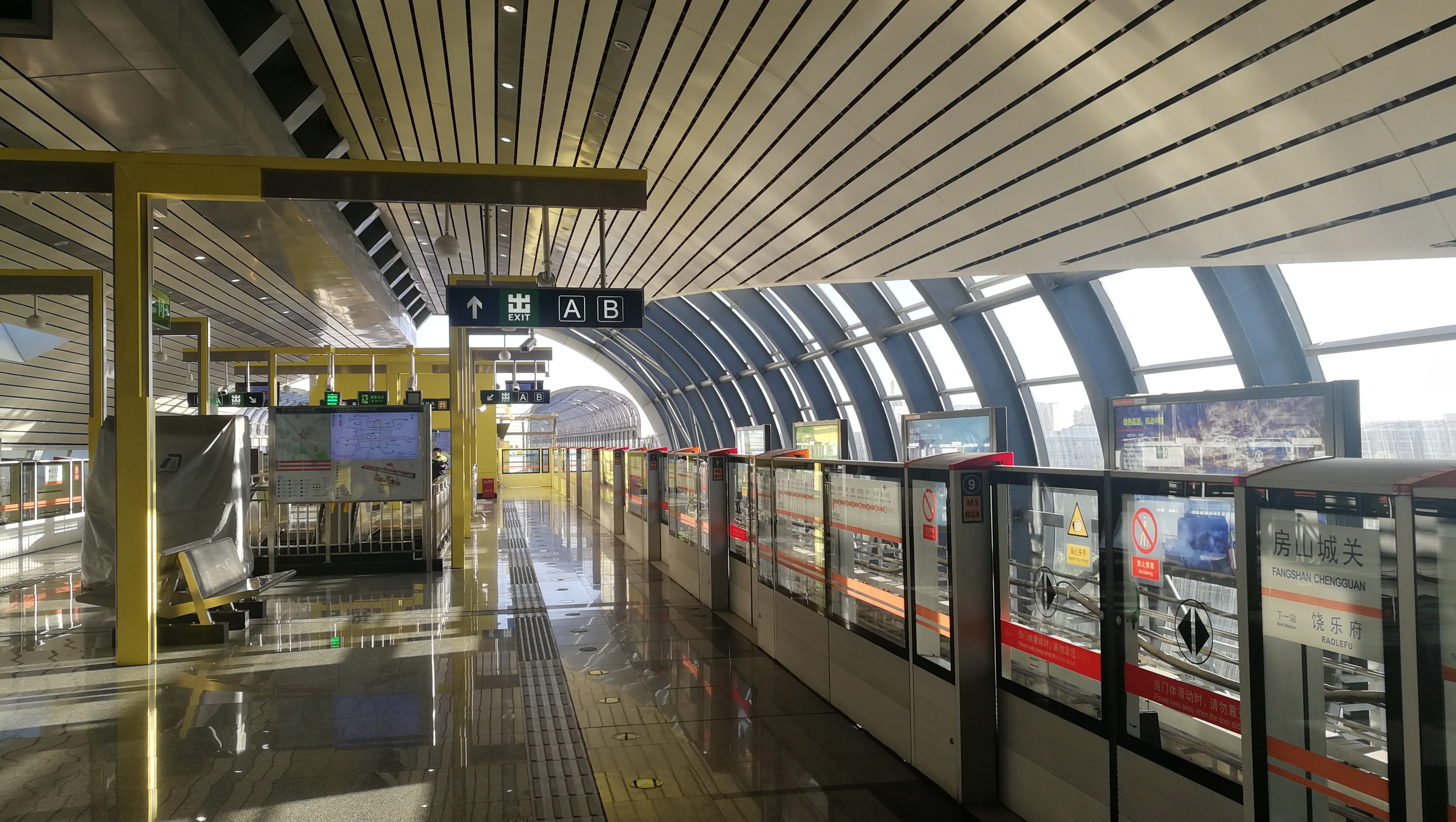
Platform
