= Huaxiang Dongqiao station =

Beijing Subway station

Huaxiang Dongqiao 花乡东桥
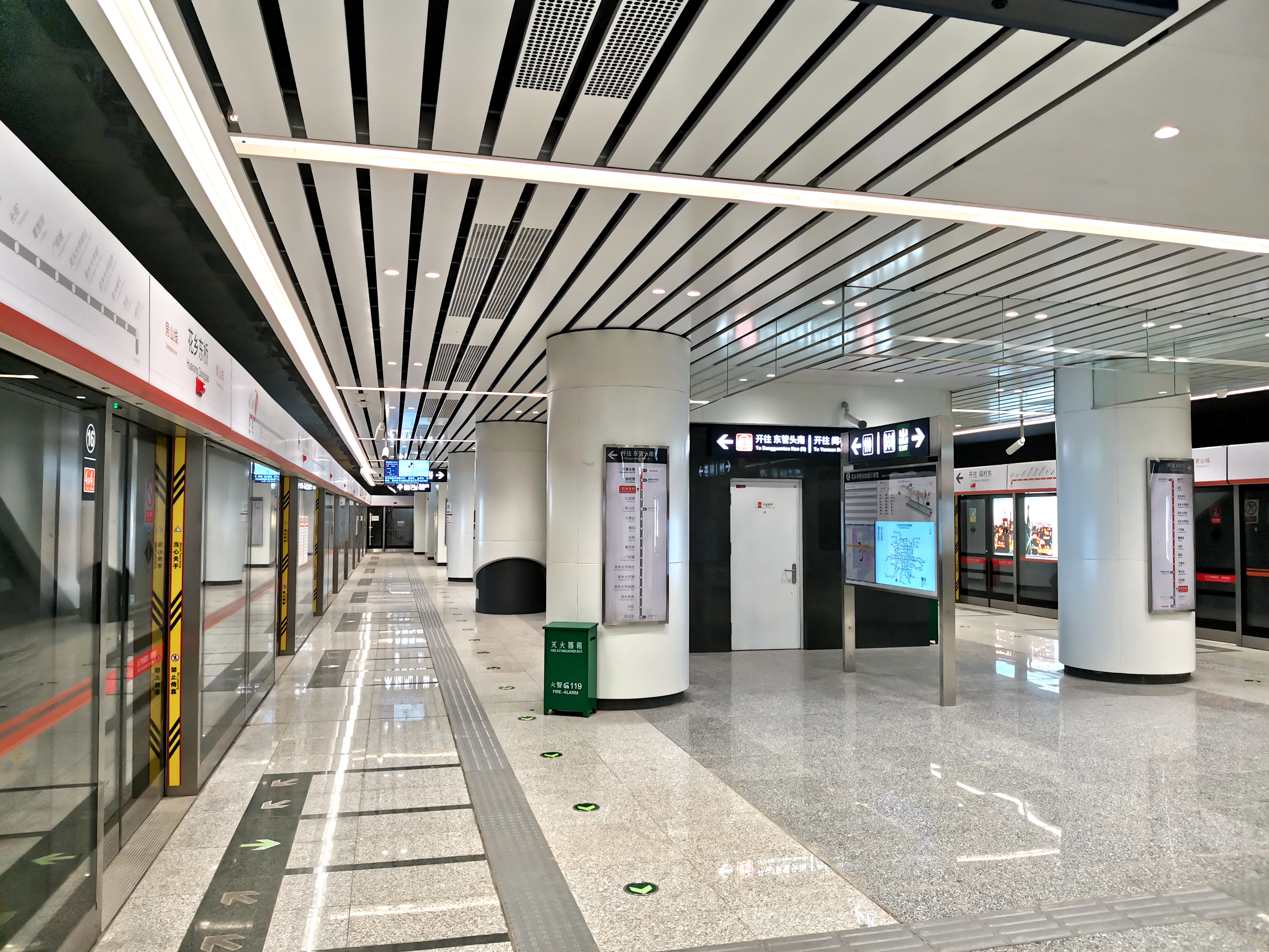
- Platform

General information
- Location: Intersection of 4th Ring Road and Zhangxin Road; Kandan Subdistrict and Yuquanying Subdistrict, Fengtai District, Beijing; China
- Coordinates: 39°49′40″N 116°18′50″E
- Operator: Beijing Mass Transit Railway Operation Corporation Limited
- Line: Fangshan line
- Platforms: 2 (1 island platform)
- Tracks: 2

Construction
- Structure type: Underground
- Accessible: Yes

History
- Opened: 31 December 2020

Services
Preceding station	Beijing Subway	Following station
Capital Univ. of Economics & Business towards Dongguantounan	Fangshan line	Baipenyao towards Yancundong
Location
- Location within Beijing

Huaxiang Dongqiao station (Chinese: 花乡东桥站) is a station on the Fangshan line of the Beijing Subway.

== History ==
In August 2020, the Beijing Municipal Commission of Planning and Natural Resources proposed to rename the station to either Huaxiang Dongqiao or Huangtugang station. On 28 October 2020, the name Huaxiang Dongqiao was finally chosen for this station. The station opened on 31 December 2020.

== Platform layout ==
The station has an underground island platform.

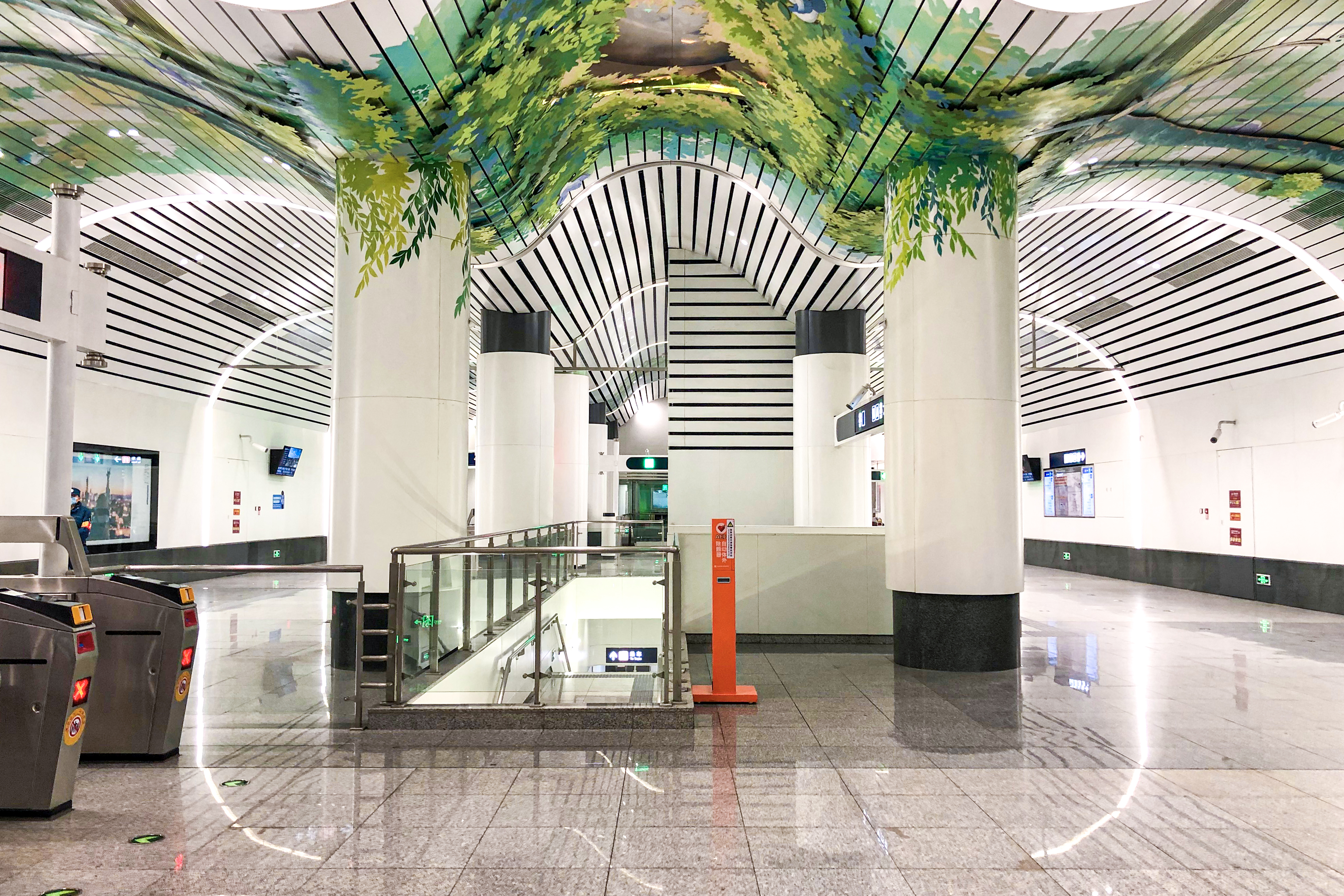
Concourse

== Exits ==
There are 4 exits, lettered A1, A2, B and C. Exit A2 and C are accessible via elevator.
