= Baipenyao station =

Beijing Subway station

Baipenyao 白盆窑
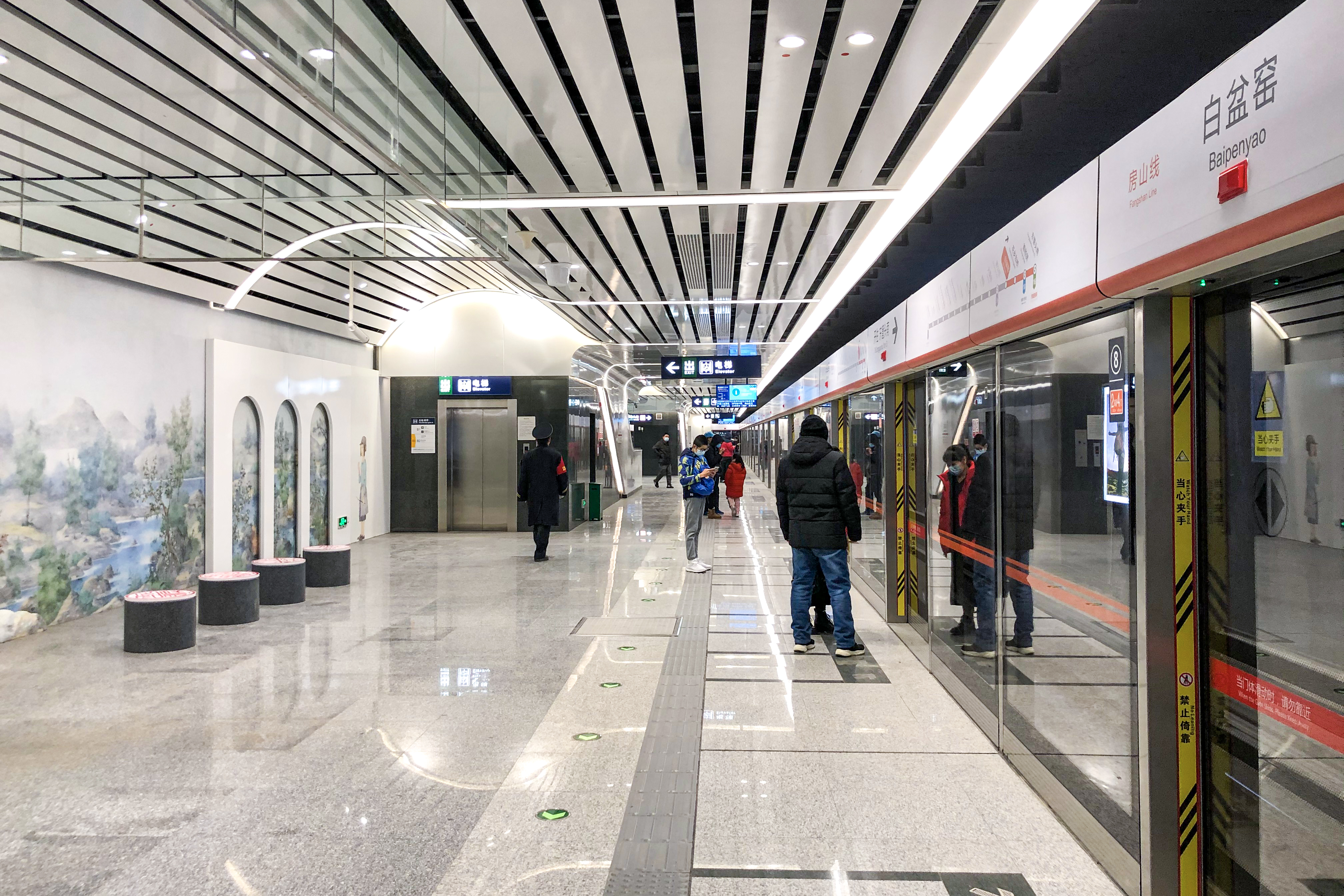
- Platform

General information
- Location: Intersection of Fanyang Rd. and Liuquan Rd., Baipenyao Village, Huaxiang Area, Fengtai District, Beijing; China
- Coordinates: 39°49′05″N 116°18′26″E
- Operator: Beijing Mass Transit Railway Operation Corporation Limited
- Line: Fangshan line
- Platforms: 2 (2 side platforms)
- Tracks: 2

Construction
- Structure type: Underground
- Accessible: Yes

History
- Opened: December 31, 2020

Services
Preceding station	Beijing Subway	Following station
Huaxiang Dongqiao towards Dongguantounan	Fangshan line	Guogongzhuang towards Yancundong
Location
- Location within Beijing

Baipenyao station (Chinese: 白盆窑站) is a station on the Fangshan line of the Beijing Subway.

== History ==
The station was originally called Fanyanglu. In August 2020, it was renamed to Baipenyao. The station opened on December 31, 2020.

== Station layout ==
The station has 2 underground side platforms.

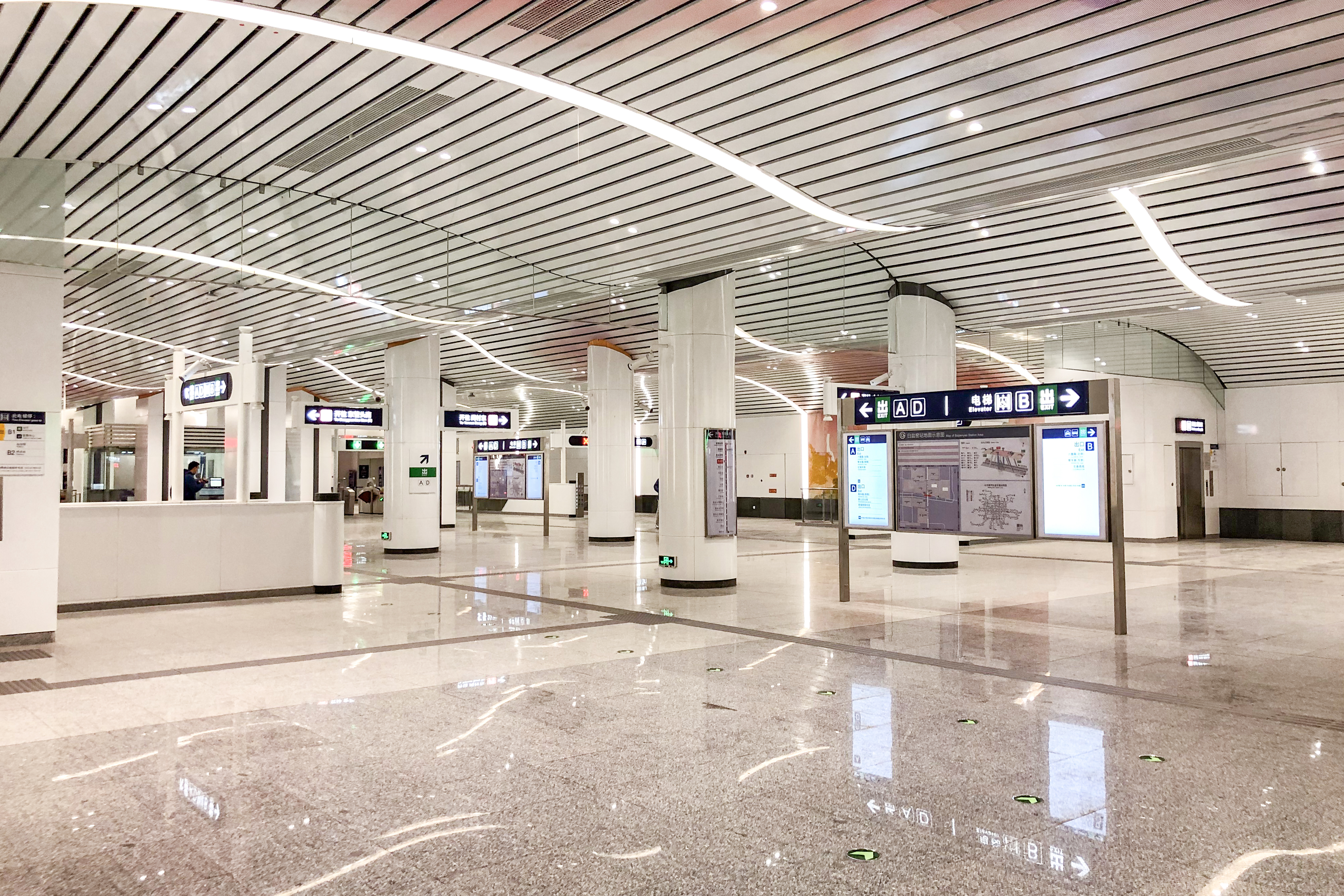
Concourse

== Exits ==
There are 3 exits, lettered A, B, and D. Exit B is accessible via an elevator.
