= Zicaowu station =

Beijing Subway station

Zicaowu 紫草坞
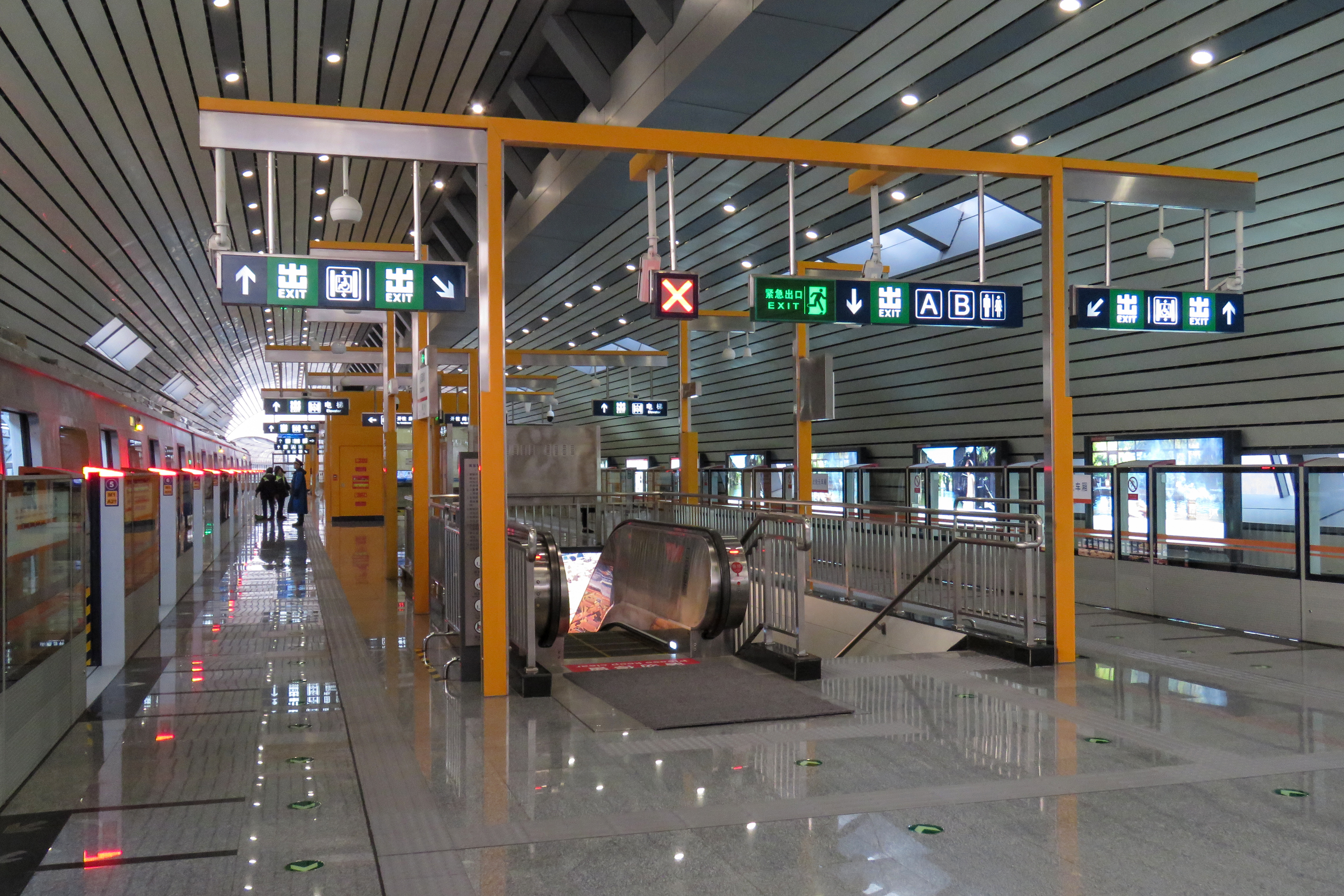
- Platform

General information
- Location: Yancun, Fangshan District, Beijing; China
- Coordinates: 39°43′29″N 116°05′12″E
- Operator: Beijing Metro Operation Administration (BJMOA) Corp., Ltd.
- Line: Yanfang line
- Platforms: 2 (1 island platform)
- Tracks: 2

Construction
- Structure type: Elevated
- Accessible: Yes

History
- Opened: 30 December 2017

Services
Preceding station	Beijing Subway	Following station
Yancundong towards Yancundong	Yanfang line	Yancun towards Yanshan
Location
- Location within Beijing

Zicaowu station (simplified Chinese: 紫草坞站; traditional Chinese: 紫草塢站; pinyin: Zǐcǎowù Zhàn) is a station on Yanfang Line of the Beijing Subway. It was opened on 30 December 2017.

== Station layout ==
The station has an elevated island platform.

== Exits ==
There are 2 exits, lettered A and B. Both exits are accessible.
