= Yanfang line =

Railway line in Beijing, China

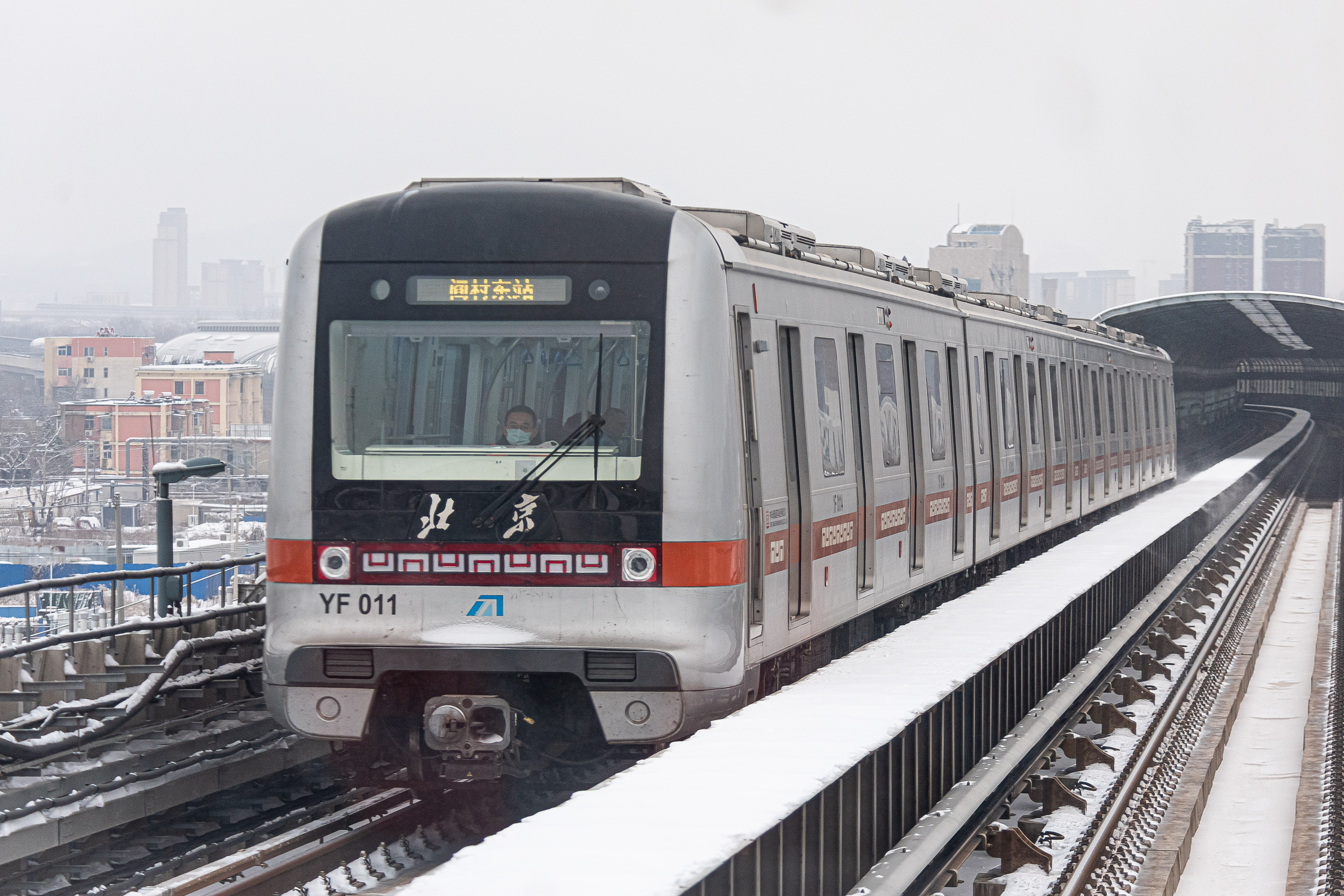
- A Yanfang line train between Magezhuang and Dashihedong

Overview
- Other names: M25 South (planned name); Line 25 South
- Native name: 燕房线
- Status: Main line in operation
- Locale: Fangshan District; Beijing
- Termini: Yancundong; Yanshan
- Stations: 9 in operation

Service
- Type: Rapid transit
- System: Beijing Subway
- Operator(s): Beijing Metro Operation Administration (BJMOA) Corp., Ltd.
- Depot(s): Yancun North
- Rolling stock: 4-car Type B (DKZ76, SFM16)

History
- Opened: 30 December 2017; 8 years ago

Technical
- Line length: 14.4 km (8.9 mi) (main line)
- Character: Elevated
- Track gauge: 1,435 mm (4 ft 8 1/2 in)
- Operating speed: 80 km/h (50 mph)

The Yanfang line (Chinese: 燕房线; pinyin: yānfáng xiàn) is a rapid transit line of the Beijing Subway, served in Fangshan District, Beijing. It was opened on December 30, 2017.

== History ==
Construction of the Yanfang Line was scheduled to commence in September 2011 and be completed by 2013. On October 17, 2011, the Ministry of Environmental Protection declined to approve plans for the line citing lack of approval for the project from the National Development and Reform Commission and uncertain environmental impact of the line on the South–North Water Transfer Project which has a channel and reservoir in Fangshan District. As a result, the onset of construction was delayed to at least the end of 2013.

Construction on Yanfang Line was started in April 2014. The line was scheduled to open in 2017. The line opened on December 30, 2017.

Segment	Commencement	Length	Station(s)	Name
Yancundong — Yanshan	30 December 2017	14.4 km (8.95 mi)	9	(main line)

== Route ==
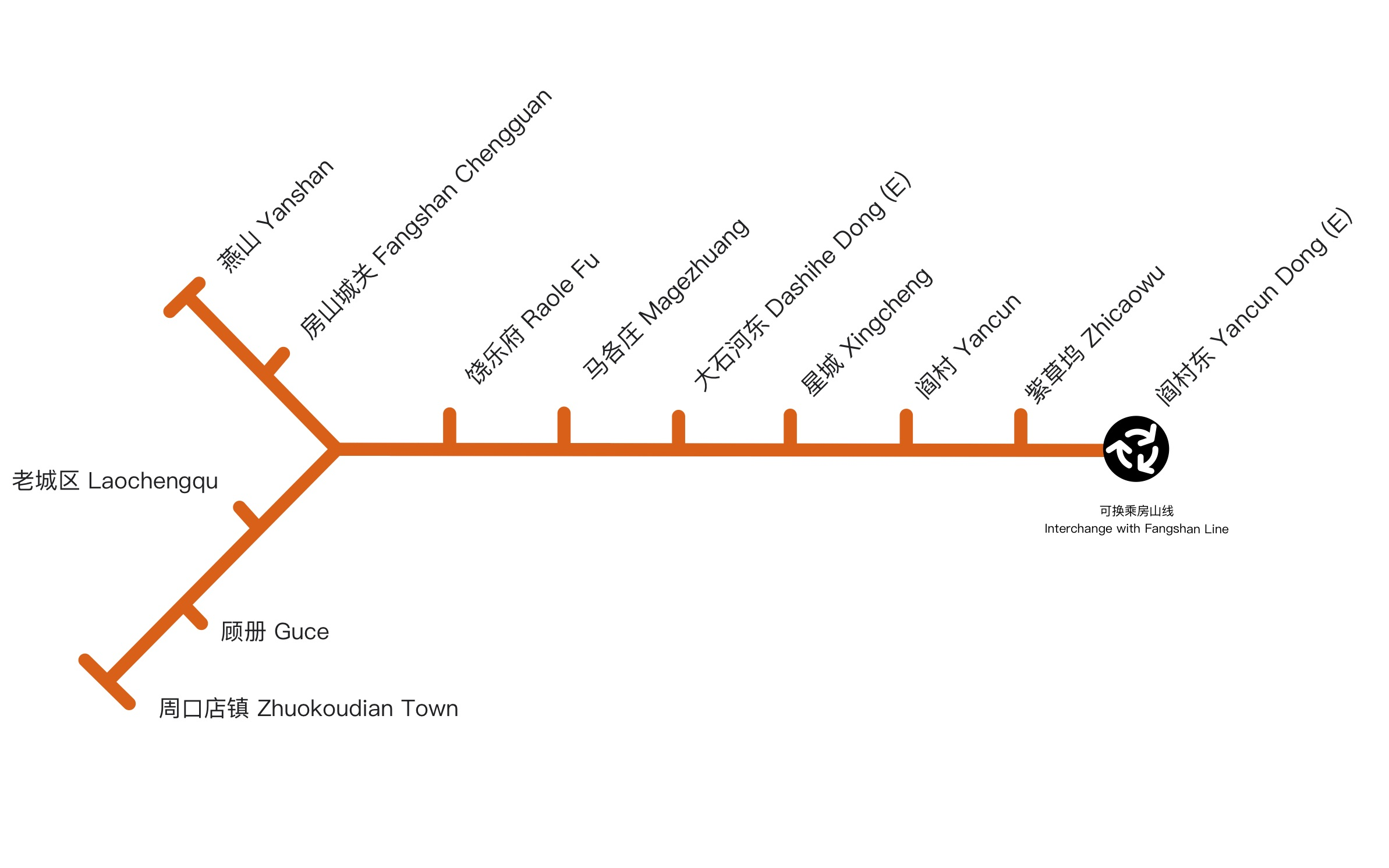
Map of Yanfang Line.

The line is projected to be Y-shaped, with the main line starting at Yanshan and the branch line starting at Zhoukoudian Town. The two will merge at Raolefu before terminating at Yancundong. Currently only the main line is operational, while the branch line is under planning.

=== Stations ===
Service routes		Station Name		Connections	Nearby Bus Stops	Distance km		Location
Service routes		English	Chinese	Connections	Nearby Bus Stops	Distance km		Location
●	●	Yancundong	阎村东	Fangshan	F43 F48 F49 F50 F57 F69 F78	0.000	0.000	Fangshan
●	●	Zicaowu	紫草坞		832 951 F13 F70 F85	1.541	1.541	Fangshan
●	●	Yancun	阎村		836 839 901 901快 917 934 952 F12 F76 F83 快速直达专线86	1.210	2.751	Fangshan
●	●	Xingcheng	星城		831 836 839 901 901快 904 917 934 952 F12 F76 F83 快速直达专线86	1.649	4.400	Fangshan
●	●	Dashihedong	大石河东		831 836 839 901 917 F12 F47 F76 F83	1.929	6.329	Fangshan
●	●	Magezhuang	马各庄		831 836 839 901 917 F12 F19 F26 F30 F47 F76 F80 F83 快速直达专线86	2.087	8.416	Fangshan
●	●	Raole Fu	饶乐府		831 836 839 901 917 F12 F19 F26 F30 F47 F76 F80 F83	0.984	9.400	Fangshan
●	｜	Fangshan Chengguan	房山城关		836 839 F15 F20 F21 F22 F23 F24 F25 F26 F56 F76 F77 F83	1.777	11.177	Fangshan
●	｜	Yanshan	燕山		831 837 901 906 F11 F20 F21 F22 F23 F24 F25 F40 F47 F77 F80	2.076	13.253	Fangshan
	●	Laochengqu	老城区					Fangshan
	●	Guce	顾册					Fangshan
	●	Zhoukoudian Town	周口店镇					Fangshan

== Rolling Stock ==
Model	Image	Manufacturer	Year built	Amount in service	Fleet numbers	Depot
DKZ76		CRRC Changchun Railway Vehicles	2015	15	YF 001–YF015	Yancun North
SFM16		CRRC Qingdao Sifang	2016	1	YF016	Yancun North

== Technology ==
The line is the first in Beijing to be capable of unattended train operations, and the first in China to exclusively use subsystems developed by domestic manufacturers.

== Future Development ==
The 6.1 km (3.8 mi) branch line of Yanfang line, from Raolefu station to Zhoukoudian Town station is under planning. Due to low passenger flow, the branch line will not be built in the short-term planning. In addition, Beijing Subway is evaluating the possibile merge with the Fangshan line.
