= Yanshan station (Beijing Subway) =

Beijing Subway station

Yanshan 燕山
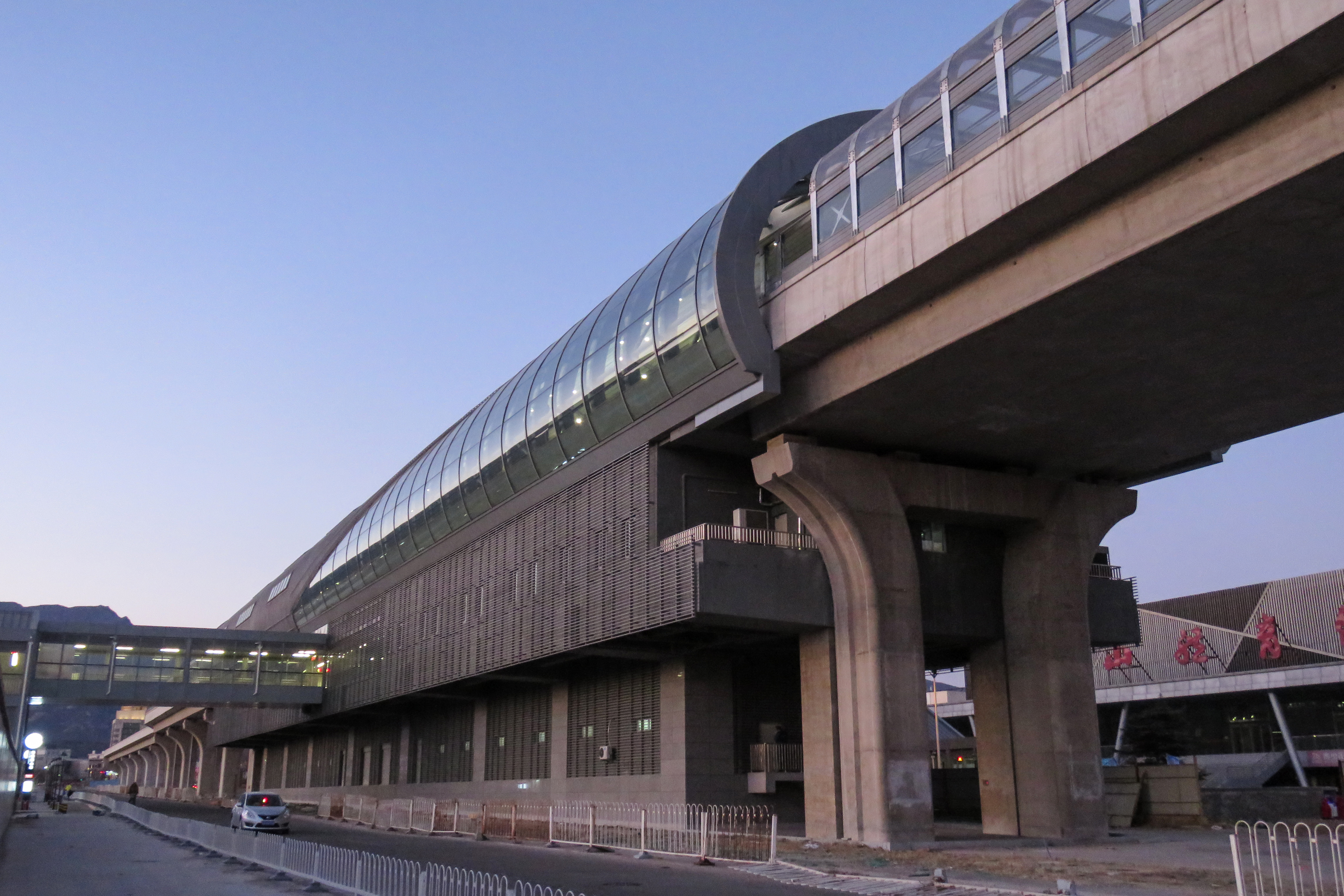
- Exterior

General information
- Other names: Yanhua
- Location: Yanfang Road; Yingfeng Subdistrict, Fangshan District, Beijing; China
- Coordinates: 39°43′11″N 115°58′24″E
- Operator: Beijing Metro Operation Administration (BJMOA) Corp., Ltd.
- Line: Yanfang line
- Platforms: 2 (1 island platform)
- Tracks: 2

Construction
- Structure type: Elevated
- Accessible: Yes

History
- Opened: 30 December 2017

Services
Preceding station	Beijing Subway	Following station
Fangshan Chengguan towards Yancundong	Yanfang line	Terminus
Location
- Location within Beijing

Yanshan station (Chinese: 燕山站; pinyin: Yānshān Zhàn) is a station on and the western terminus of the Yanfang Line of the Beijing Subway. It was opened on 30 December 2017, and is the westernmost station of the Beijing Subway.

== Station layout ==
The station has an elevated island platform.

== Exits ==
There are 2 exits, lettered A and B. Both exits are accessible.

== Gallery ==
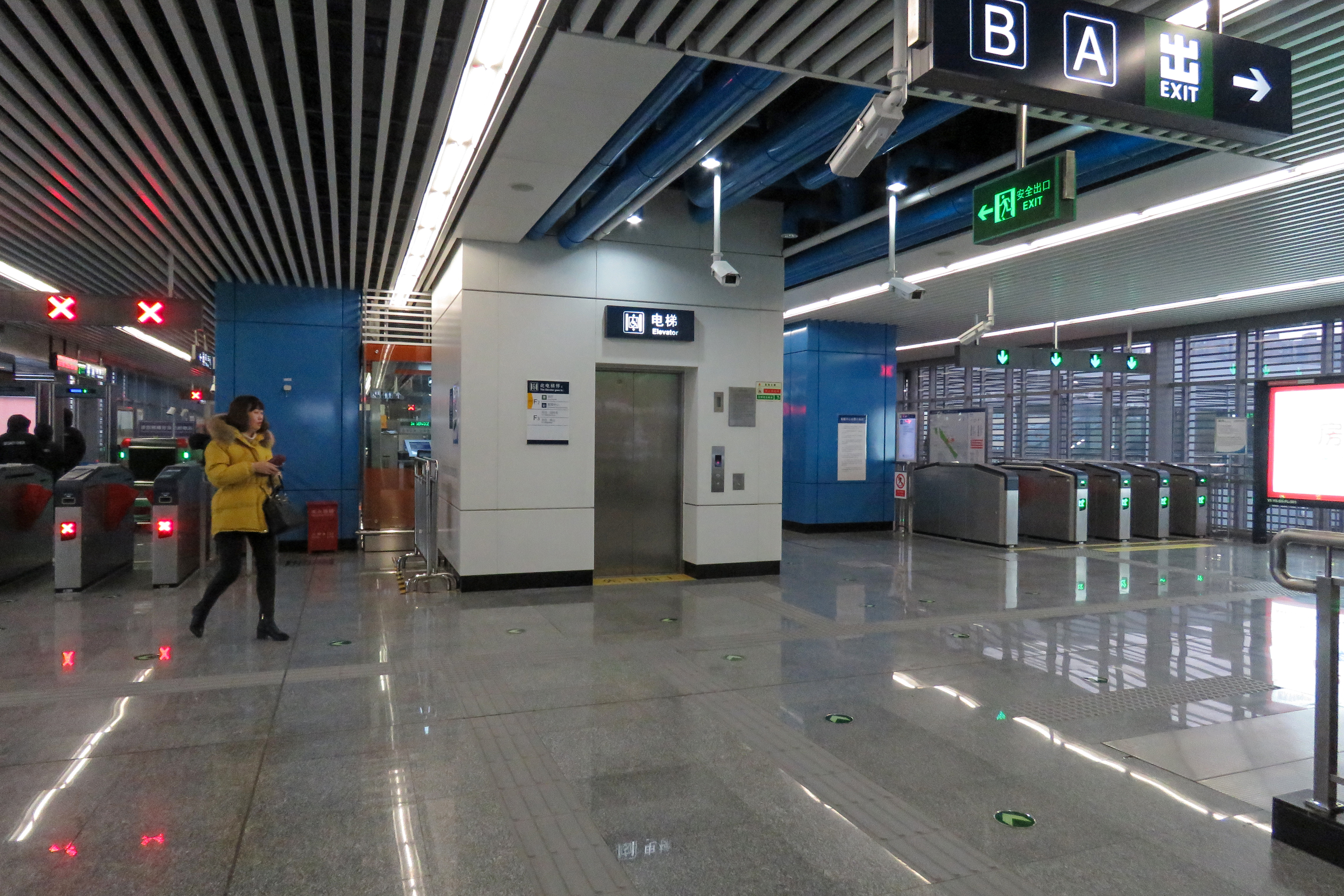
Concourse

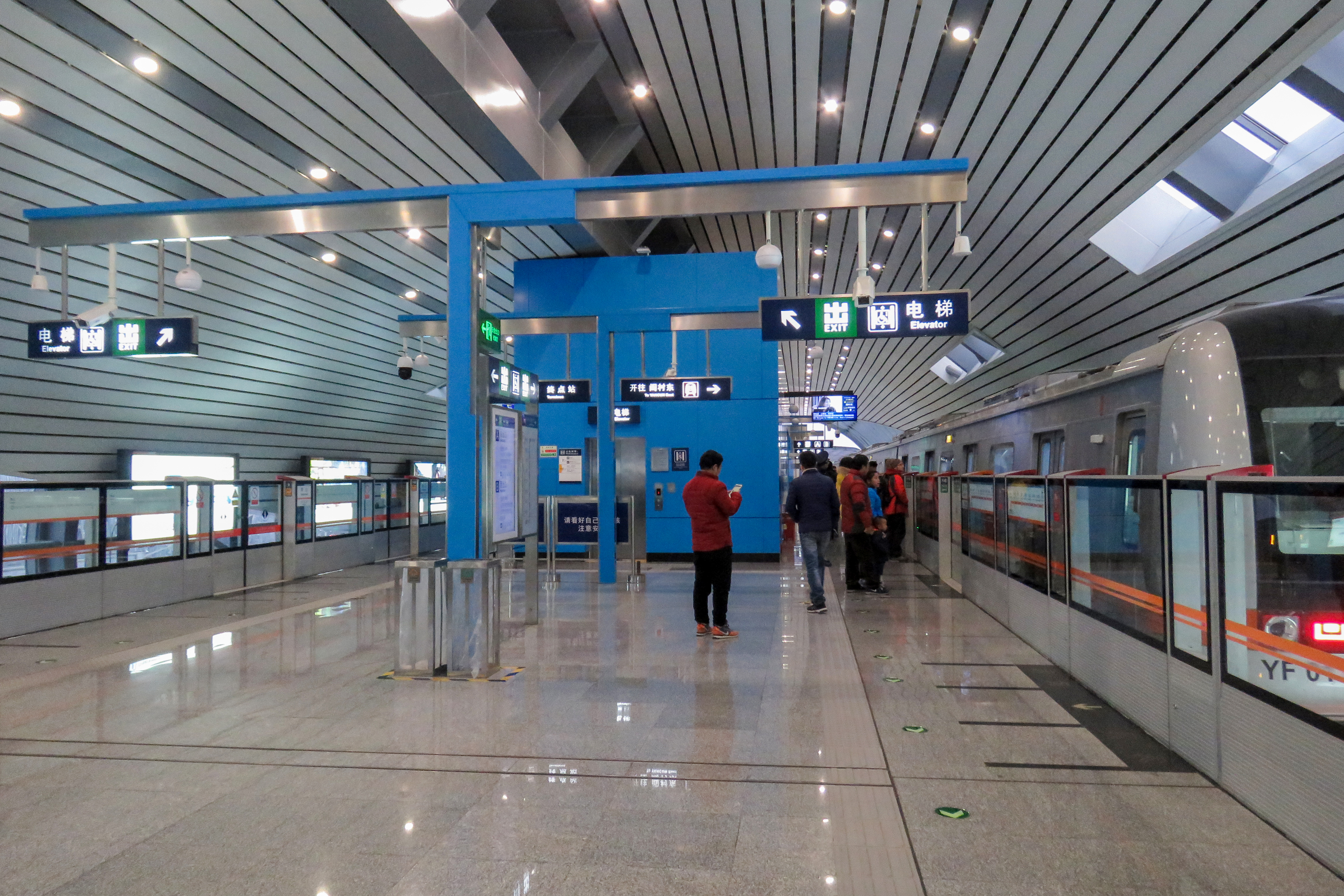
Platform

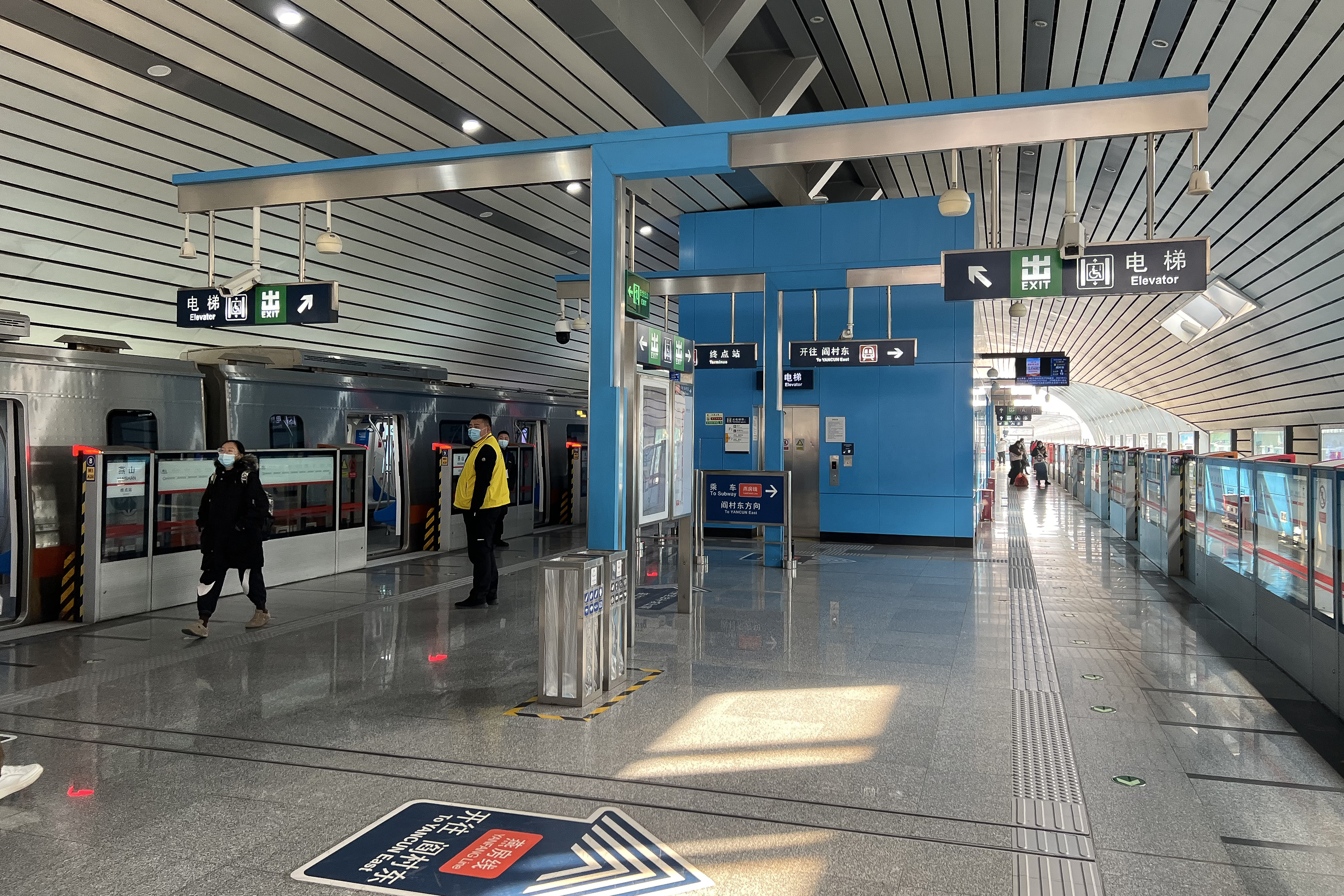
Platform
