= Yancundong station =

Beijing Subway interchange station

Yancundong 阎村东
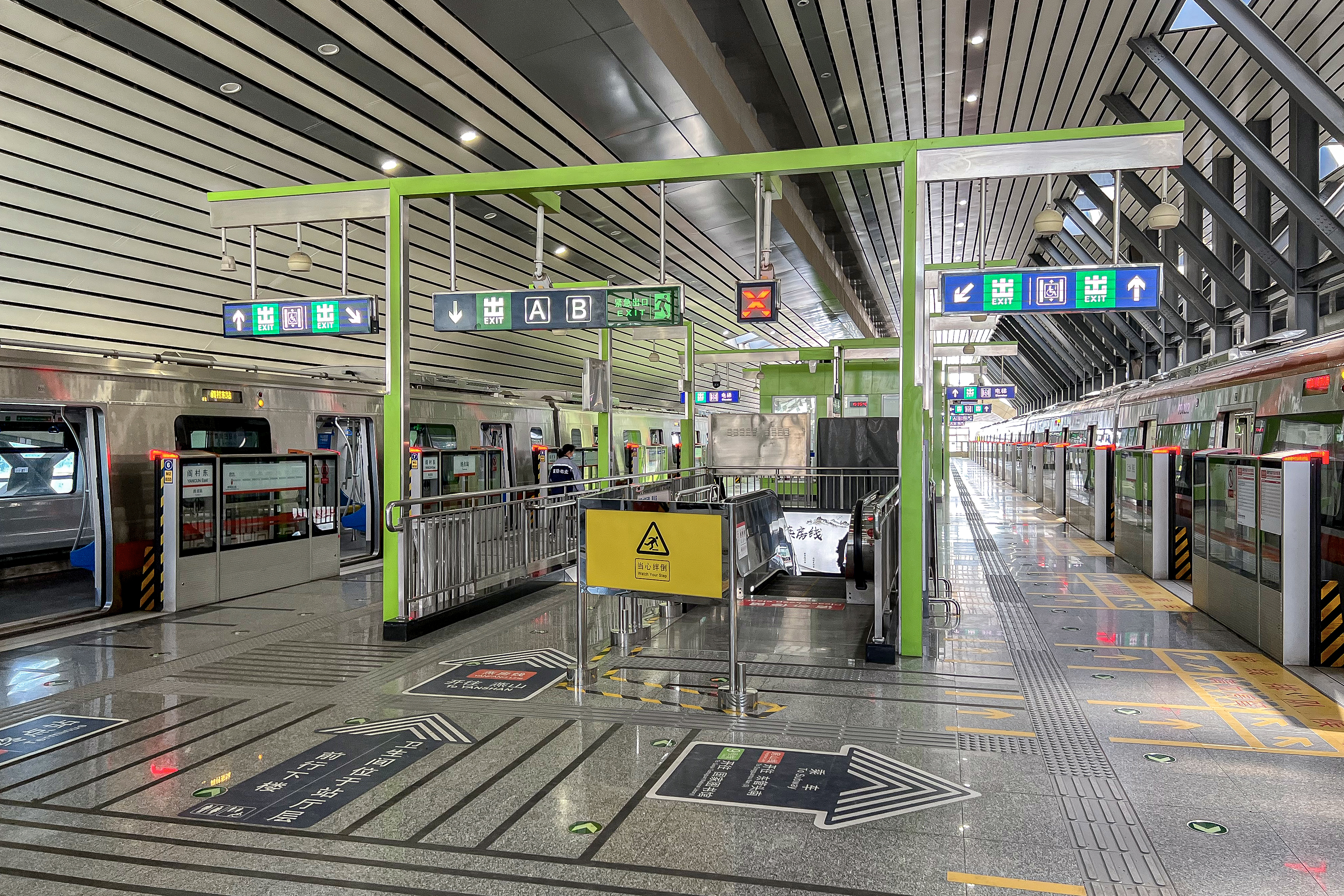
- Eastbound platform

General information
- Location: Dongyancun, Xilu Subdistrict, Fangshan District, Beijing; China
- Coordinates: 39°43′45″N 116°06′03″E
- Operator: Beijing Mass Transit Railway Operation Corporation Limited (Fangshan line); Beijing Metro Operation Administration (BJMOA) Corp., Ltd. (Yanfang line)
- Lines: Fangshan line Yanfang line
- Platforms: 4 (2 island platforms)
- Tracks: 4

Construction
- Structure type: Elevated
- Accessible: Yes

History
- Opened: December 30, 2017; 8 years ago

Services
Preceding station	Beijing Subway	Following station
Suzhuang towards Dongguantounan	Fangshan line	Terminus
Terminus	Yanfang line	Zicaowu towards Yanshan
Location
- Location within Beijing

Yancundong station (simplified Chinese: 阎村东站; traditional Chinese: 閻村東站; pinyin: Yáncūn Dōng Zhàn) is an interchange station on Fangshan Line and Yanfang Line of the Beijing Subway. It was opened on December 30, 2017.

== Station layout ==
The station has elevated dual-island platforms with a cross platform interchange. Fangshan line trains serve the inner platforms whilst Yanfang line trains serve the outer platforms. On one side, terminating Fangshan line trains interchange with Yanfang line trains heading to Yanshan, whilst on the other, terminating Yanfang line trains interchange with Fangshan line trains heading to Dongguantou South.

== Exits ==
There are 4 exits, lettered A1, A2, B1, and B2. Exits A2 and B2 are accessible.
