= Fozizhuang Township =

Fozizhuang Township 佛子庄乡
- Township
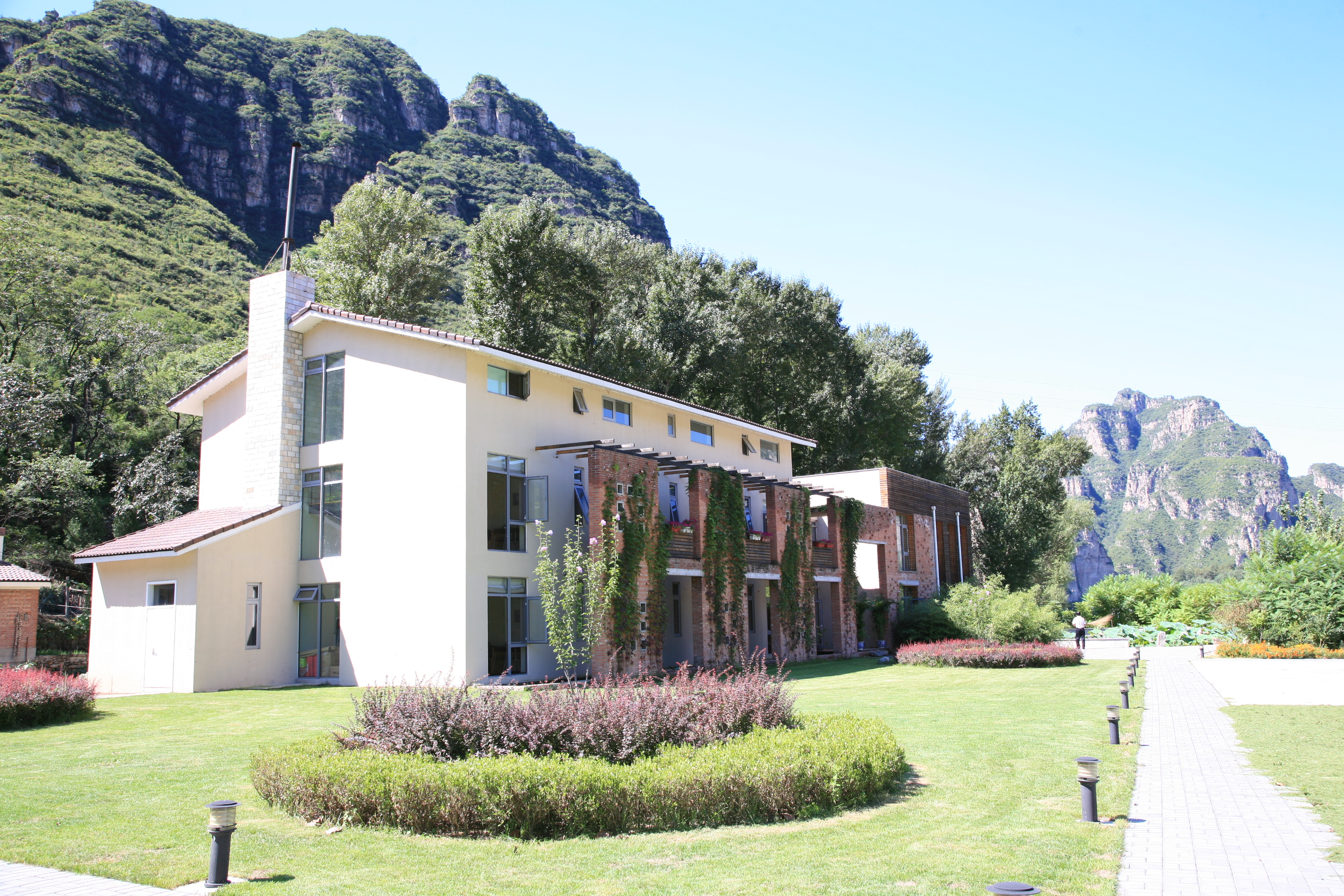
- Wudu Club on the east of the township, 2008

- Location within Beijing Location within China
- Coordinates: 39°49′11″N 115°53′04″E
- Country: China
- Municipality: Beijing
- District: Fangshan
- Village-level Divisions: 18 villages

Area
  - Total: 150.2 km^{2} (58.0 sq mi)
- Elevation: 450 m (1,480 ft)

Population (2020)
  - Total: 6,183
  - Density: 41.17/km^{2} (106.6/sq mi)
- Time zone: UTC+8 (China Standard)
- Postal code: 102417
- Area code: 010

Fozizhuang Township (Chinese: 佛子庄乡; pinyin: Fúzizhuāng Xiāng) is a township situated in northern part of Fangshan District, Beijing, China. It shares border with Datai Subdistrict and Yongding Town in the north; Tanzhesi, Hebei Towns and Xiangyang Subdistrict in the east; Zhoukoudian Town, Nanjiao and Xiayunling Townships in the south; Shijiaying Township and Da'anshan Townships in the west. As of 2020, its census population was 6,183.

This area first became a village during the Yuan dynasty. The name Fozizhuang (Chinese: 佛子庄; lit. 'Buddha Villa') was given for the buddha statue on village gate when it was founded.

== History ==
Timeline of Fozizhuang Township
Year	Status	Under
1949 - 1952	9th District 7th District	Fangshan County
1952 - 1953	Hebei District	Jingxi Mining Area
1953 - 1958	Fozizhuang Township	Jingxi Mining Area
1958 - 1960	Hebei People's Commune	Zhoukoudian District
1960 - 1961	Hebei People's Commune	Fangshan County
1961 - 1962	Fozizhuang People's Commune Changcao People's Commune	Fangshan County
1962 - 1971	Bangezhuang People's Commune Changcao People's Commune	Fangshan County
1971 - 1980	Dong Bangezhuang People's Commune Changcao People's Commune	Fangshan County
1980 - 1983	Dong Bangezhuang People's Commune Changcao People's Commune	Gongnong District of Beijing Bureau of Mining Affairs
1983 - 1992	Dong Bangezhuang Township Changcao Township	Gongnong District of Beijing Bureau of Mining Affairs
1992 - 1993	Dong Bangezhuang Township Changcao Township	Fangshan District
1993–present	Fozizhuang Township	Fangshan District

== Administrative Divisions ==
As of 2021, Fozizhuang Township consisted of 18 villages:

Administrative division code	Subdivision names	Name transliterations
110111210200	陈家台	Chenjiatai
110111210201	东班各庄	Dong Bangezhuang
110111210202	西班各庄	Xi Banggezhuang
110111210203	陈家坟	Chenjiafen
110111210204	北峪	Beiyu
110111210205	黑龙关	Heilongguan
110111210206	佛子庄	Fozizhuang
110111210207	红煤厂	Hongmeichang
110111210208	北窖	Beijiao
110111210209	下英水	Xiayingshui
110111210210	中英水	Zhongyingshui
110111210211	上英水	Shangyingshui
110111210212	西安	Xi'an
110111210213	查儿	Cha'er
110111210214	长操	Changcao
110111210215	山川	Shanchuan
110111210216	贾峪口	Jiayukou
110111210217	石板房	Shibanfang

== Gallery ==
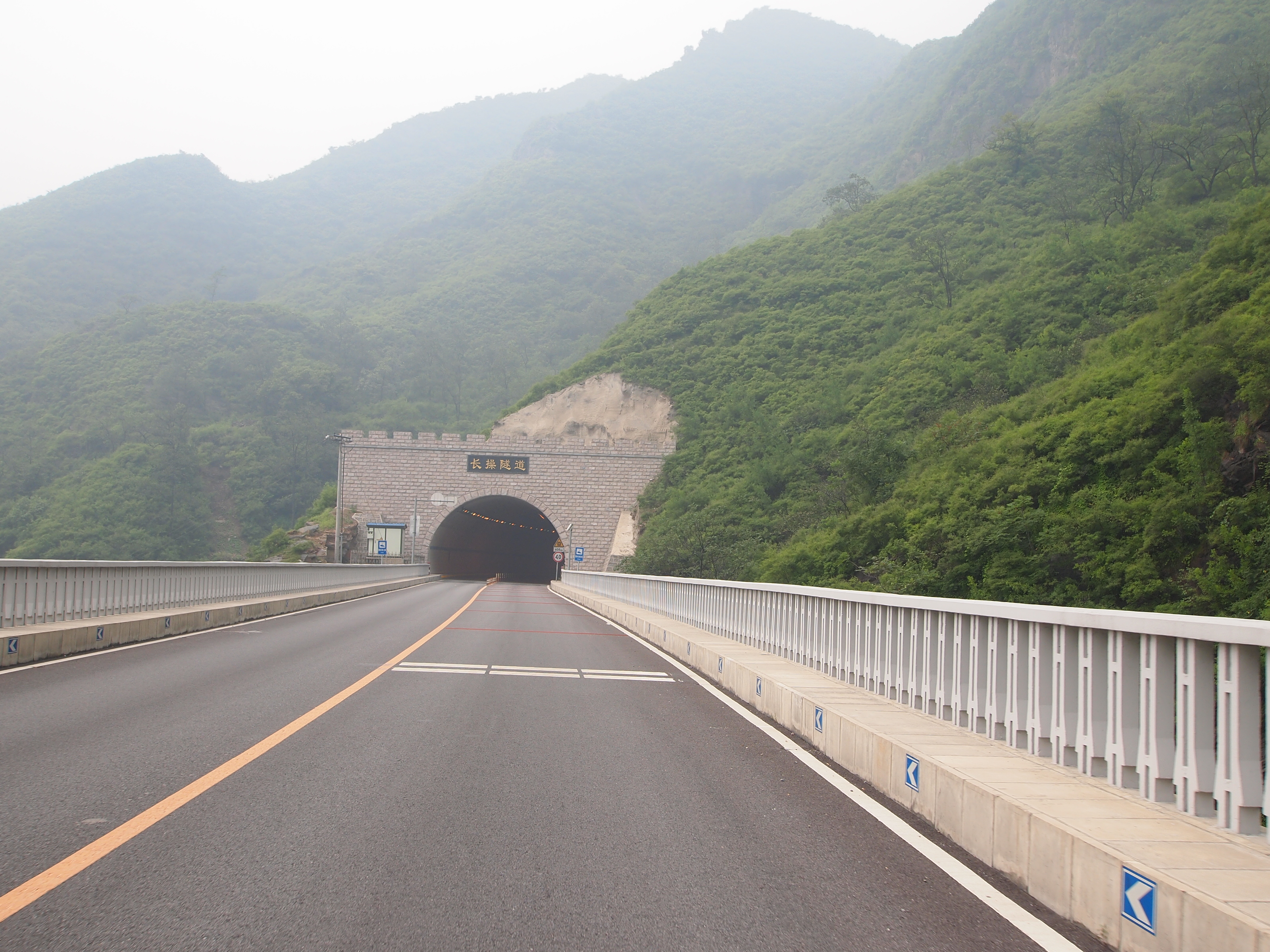
Tunnel in Changcao Village, 2018

== See also ==
- List of township-level divisions of Beijing
