= Shijiaying Township =

Shijiaying Township 史家营乡
- Township
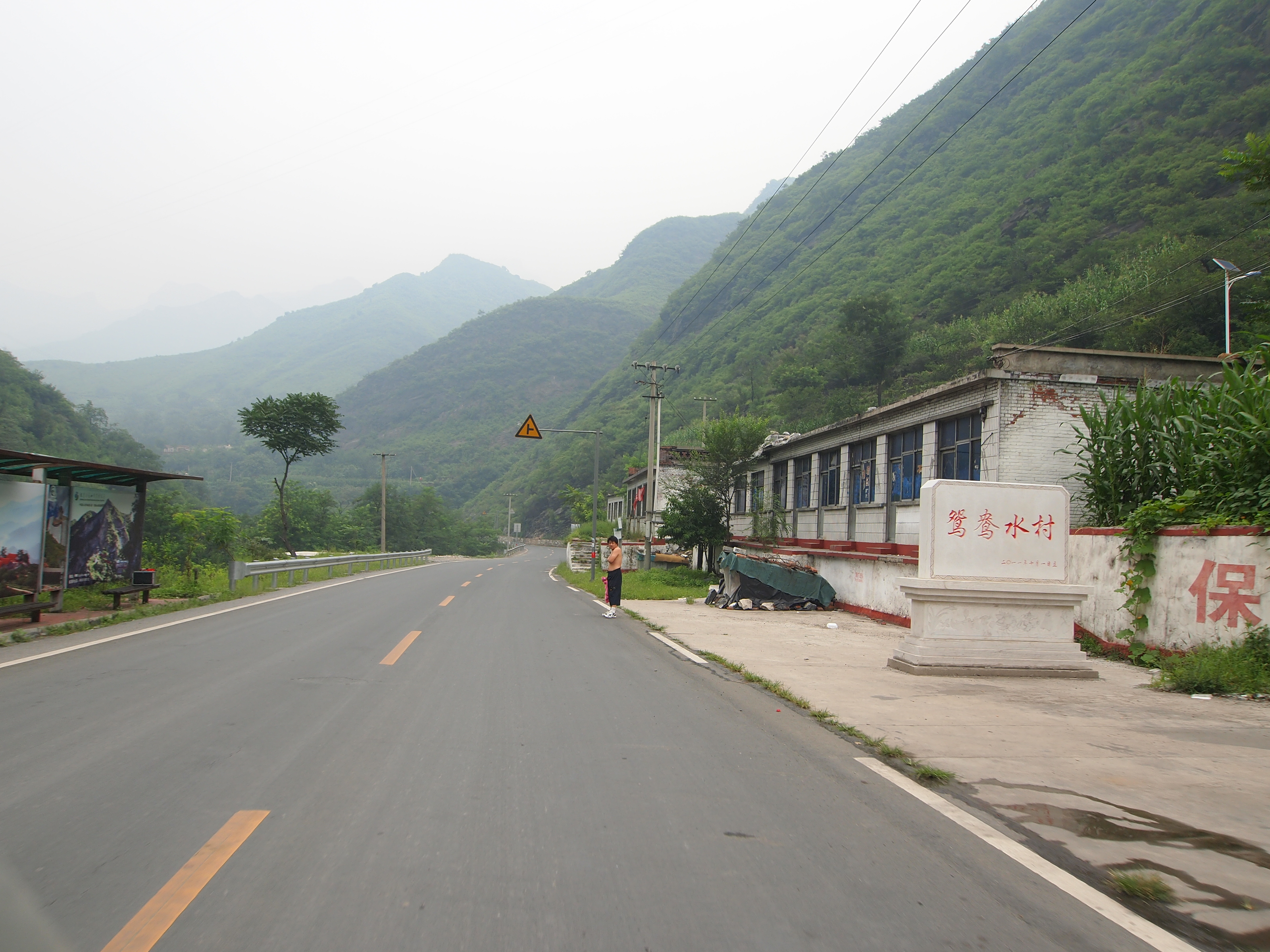
- Yuanyangshui Village within the town, 2012

- Location within Beijing Location within China
- Coordinates: 39°51′28″N 115°39′50″E
- Country: China
- Municipality: Beijing
- District: Fangshan
- Village-level Divisions: 12 villages

Area
  - Total: 107.9 km^{2} (41.7 sq mi)
- Elevation: 650 m (2,130 ft)

Population (2020)
  - Total: 3,364
  - Density: 31.18/km^{2} (80.75/sq mi)
- Time zone: UTC+8 (China Standard)
- Postal code: 102461
- Area code: 010

Shijiaying Township (Chinese: 史家营乡; pinyin: Shǐjiāyíng Xiāng) is a township located in northwestern Fangshan District, Beijing, China. It borders Zhaitang Town in its north, Da'anshan and Fozizhuang Townships in its east, Xiayunling Townships in its south, and Qingshui Town in its west. According to the 2020 census, its population was 3,364.

== History ==
Timetable of Shijiaying Township
Year	Status	Within	Border Change
1952–1953	Jinjitai District	Jingxi Mining Area	
1953–1956	Shijiaying Township	Jingxi Mining Area	
1956–1958	Part of Lianhua'an Township	Jingxi Mining Area	
1958–1959	Part of Baihuashan People's Commune	Zhoukoudian District	
1959–1960	Shijiaying Management District, part of Hebei People's Commune	Zhoukoudian District	
1960–1961	Shijiaying Management District, part of Hebei People's Commune	Fangshan County	
1961–1980	Shijiaying People's Commune	Fangshan County	
1980–1983	Shijiaying People's Commune	Fangshan County	Jinjitai Village transferred to Gongnong District, Beijing Bureau of Mining Affairs in 1980
1983–1992	Shijiaying Township	Fangshan County	
1992–1993	Shijiaying Township	Fangshan District	Jinjitai Village transferred to Fangshan District in 1992
1993–present	Shijiaying Township	Fangshan District	Jinjitai Village transferred to Shijiaying Township in 1993

== Administrative Divisions ==
At the end of 2021, Shijiaying Township administered 12 villages within its boundaries:

Administrative division code	Subdivision names	Name transliterations
110111212200	元阳水	Yuanyangshui
110111212201	柳林水	Liulinshui
110111212202	杨林水	Yanglinshui
110111212203	青林台	Qinglintai
110111212204	秋林铺	Qiulinpu
110111212205	莲花庵	Lianhua'an
110111212206	曹家房	Caojiafang
110111212207	史家营	Shijiaying
110111212208	大村涧	Dacunjian
110111212209	西岳台	Xiyuetai
110111212210	青土涧	Qingtujian
110111212211	金鸡台	Jinjitai

== Gallery ==
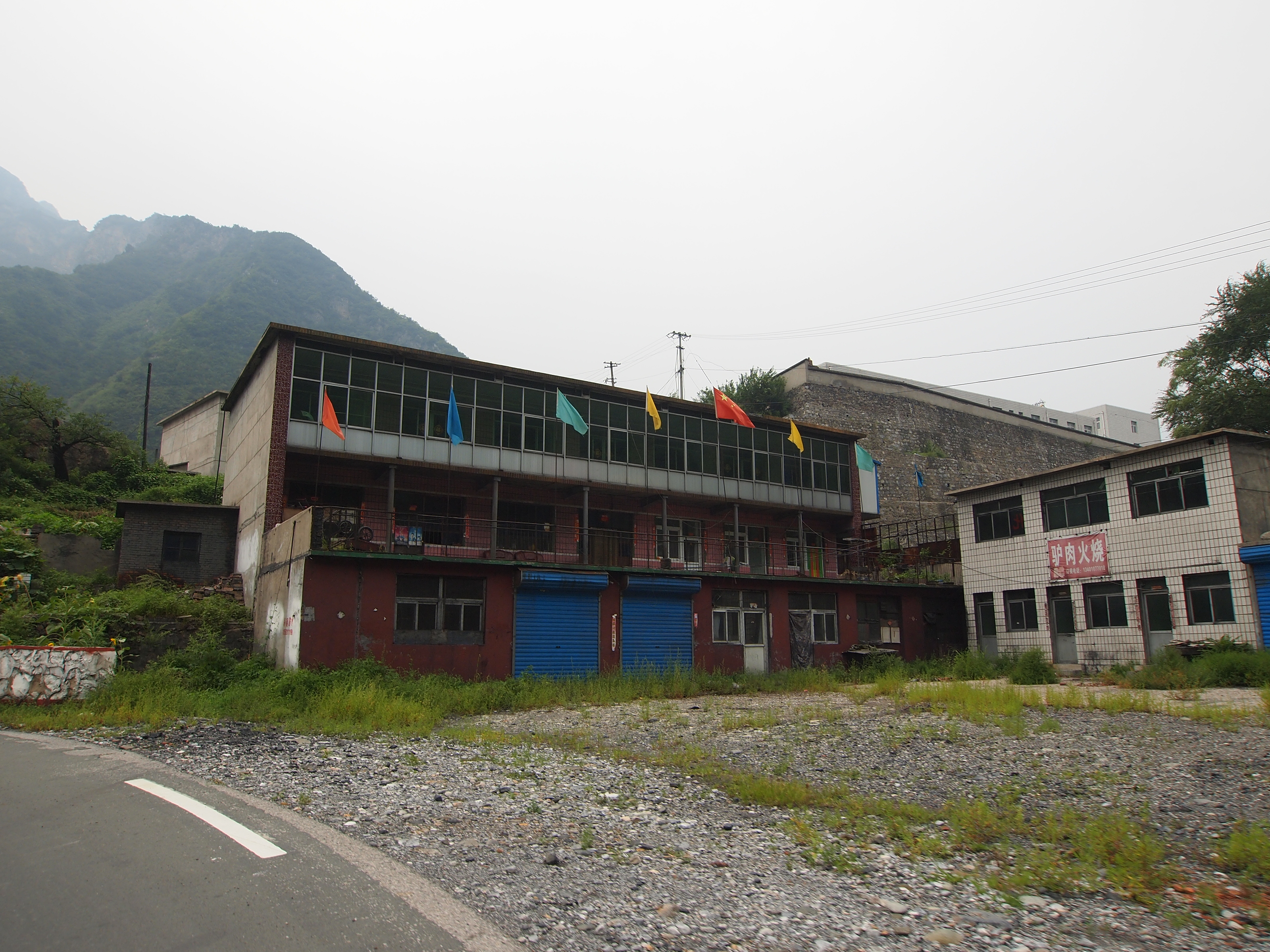
Anyue Coal Mine, 2012

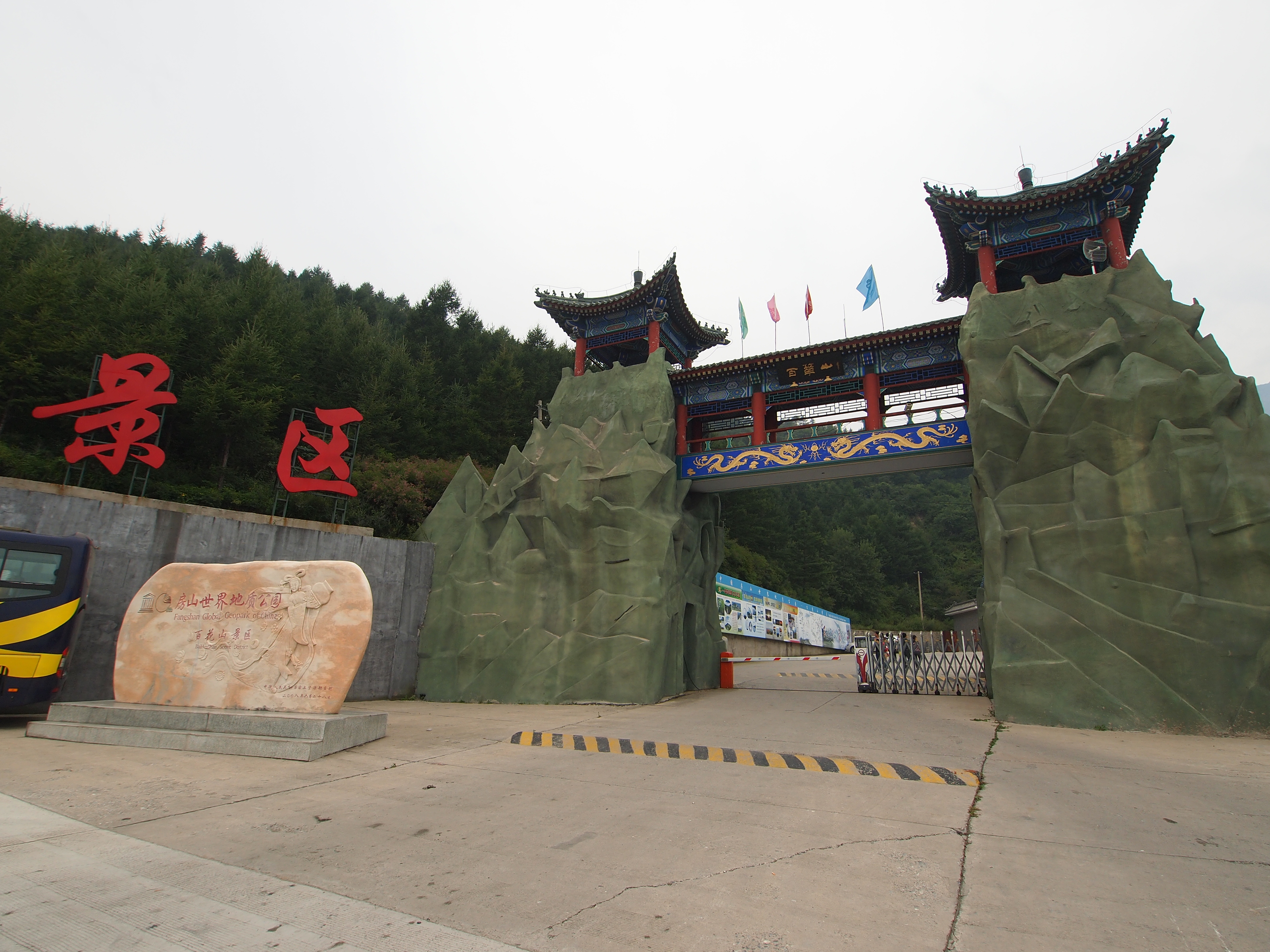
North Entrance of Baihua Mountain, 2012

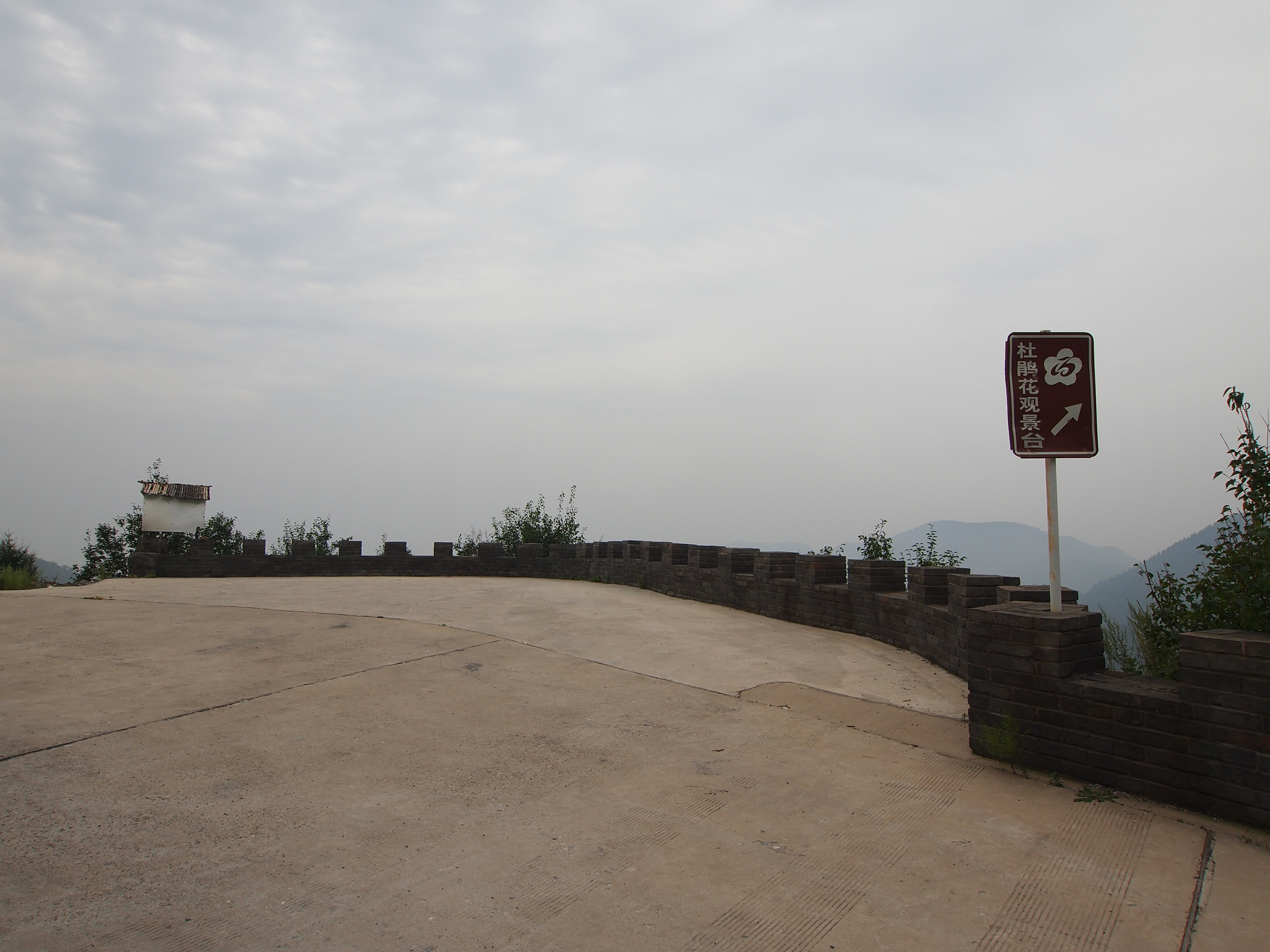
Dujuanhua Observation Platform within the Baihua Mountain, 2012

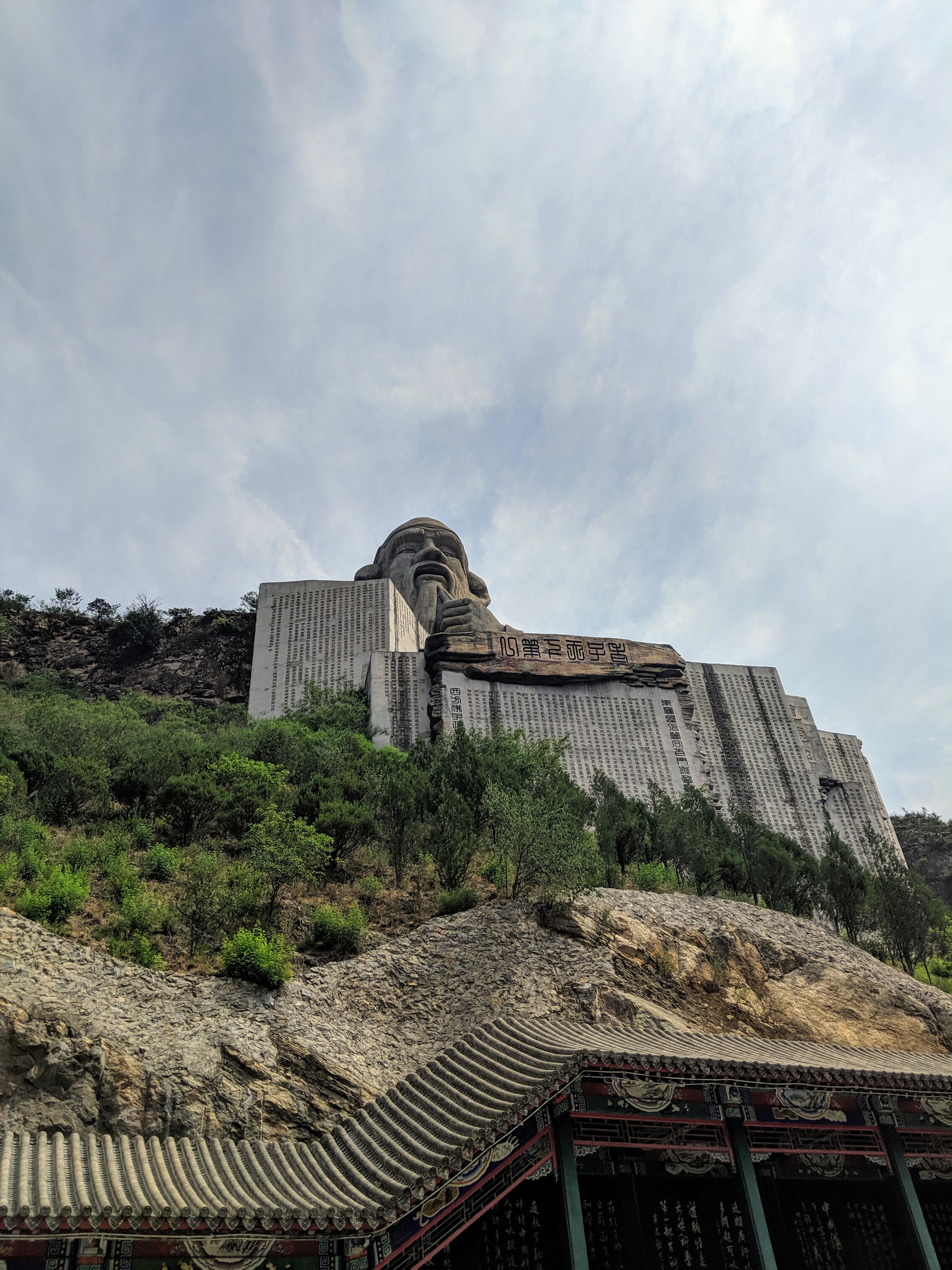
Statue of Laozi on Shenglian Mountain, 2012

== See also ==
- List of township-level divisions of Beijing
