= Nanjiao Township =

Nanjiao Township 南窖乡
- Township
- Location within Beijing Location within China
- Coordinates: 39°45′50″N 115°50′27″E
- Country: China
- Municipality: Beijing
- District: Fangshan
- Village-level Divisions: 8 villages

Area
  - Total: 40.04 km^{2} (15.46 sq mi)

Population (2020)
  - Total: 3,190
  - Density: 79.7/km^{2} (206/sq mi)
- Time zone: UTC+8 (China Standard)
- Postal code: 102418
- Area code: 010

Nanjiao Township (Chinese: 南窖乡; pinyin: Nánjiào Xiāng) is a township situated in the northern part of Fangshan District, Beijing, China. It borders Fozizhuang Town in the north, Zhoukoudian Town in the southeast, and Xiayunling Township in the southwest. The township was home to 3,190 residents in 2020.

The name Nanjiao (Chinese: 南窖; lit. 'South Cellar') is taken from the township's location within a cellar-shaped basin.

== History ==
Timeline of Nanjiao Township's History
Year	Status	Belonged to	Border change
1916 - 1952	5th District (五区)	Fangshan County (房山县)	
1952 - 1953	5th District (五区)	Jingxi Mining Area (京西矿区)	
1953 - 1956	Nanjiao Township	Jingxi Mining Area (京西矿区)	
1956 - 1958	Nanjiao Township	Jingxi Mining Area (京西矿区)	Xi'an Township (西安乡) was added in 1956
1958 - 1960	Nanjiao Management District, Hebei People's Commune	Zhoukoudian District (周口店区)	
1960 - 1961	Nanjiao Management District, Hebei People's Commune	Fangshan County	
1961 - 1980	Nanjiao People's Commune	Fangshan County	
1980 - 1983	Nanjiao People's Commune	Gongnong District of Beijing Bureau of Mining Affairs	
1983 - 1992	Nanjiao Township	Gongnong District of Beijing Bureau of Mining Affairs	
1992–present	Nanjiao Township	Fangshan District	

== Administrative Divisions ==
In 2021, Nanjiao Township was constituted by 8 villages. All of them are listed in the table below:

Administrative division code	Subdivision names	Name transliterations
110111209200	花港	Huagang
110111209201	中窖	Zhongjiao
110111209202	大西沟	Daxigou
110111209203	水峪	Shuiyu
110111209204	南窖	Nanjiao
110111209205	北安	Bei'an
110111209206	南安	Nan'an
110111209207	三合	Sanhe

== Cultural heritage sites ==
- Kaifeng Parachute Tower

== See also ==
- List of township-level divisions of Beijing
