= Da'anshan Township =

Da'anshan Township 大安山乡
- Township
- Location within Beijing Location within China
- Coordinates: 39°53′13″N 115°46′48″E
- Country: China
- Municipality: Beijing
- District: Fangshan
- Village-level Divisions: 1 community 8 villages

Area
  - Total: 62.38 km^{2} (24.09 sq mi)

Population (2020)
  - Total: 2,871
  - Density: 46.02/km^{2} (119.2/sq mi)
- Time zone: UTC+8 (China Standard)
- Postal code: 102419
- Area code: 010

Da'anshan Township (Chinese: 大安山乡; pinyin: Dà'ānshān Xiāng) is a township located inside of Fangshan District, Beijing, China. It borders Zhaitang Town and Datai Subdistrict to its north, Fozizhuang Township to its southeast, and Shijiaying Township to its southwest. Its total population was 2,871 in the 2020 census.

The name Da'anshan (Chinese: 大安山; lit. 'Great Peace Mountain') originated in the late Tang dynasty, when warlord Liu Rengong constructed Da'an Emporium around this region.

== History ==
Timetable of Da'anshan Township's History
Year	Status	Within	Border Change
1916–1949	5th District	Fangshan County	
1949–1952	9th District	Fangshan County	
1952–1953	Hebei District	Jingxi Mining Area	
1953–1958	Da'anshan Township	Jingxi Mining Area	Xiyuan Township joined in 1956
1958–1961	Da'anshan Management District, under Baihuashan People's Commune	Zhoukoudian District	
1961–1980	Da'anshan People's Commune	Fangshan County	
1980–1983	Da'anshan People's Commune	Gongnong District of Beijing Bureau of Mining Affairs	
1983–1992	Da'anshan Township	Gongnong District of Beijing Bureau of Mining Affairs	
1992–present	Da'anshan Township	Fangshan District	

== Administrative divisions ==
In 2021, Da'anshan Township comprised one residential community and eight villages:

Administrative division code	Subdivision names	Name transliterations	Type
110111211001	大安山矿	Da'anshan Kuang	Community
110111211200	大安山	Da'anshan	Village
110111211201	西苑	Xiyuan	Village
110111211202	寺尚	Sishang	Village
110111211203	赵亩地	Zhaomudi	Village
110111211204	宝地洼	Baodiwa	Village
110111211205	瞧煤涧	Qiaomeijian	Village
110111211206	中山	Zhongshan	Village
110111211207	水峪	Shuiyu	Village

== See also ==
- List of township-level divisions of Beijing
