= Kaifeng Parachute Tower =

Parachute tower in Henan, China

The Kaifeng Parachute Tower is situated to the south of Ganheyan Village in Nanjiao Township, Yuwangtai District, Kaifeng City, Henan Province, encompassing approximately 66,667 square meters.The Kaifeng Parachute Tower was constructed and became operational in June 1956. In October 2019, the Kaifeng Parachute Tower was included in the eighth batch of Major cultural heritage sites under national-level protection.

== Fabrication and Application ==
Construction of the Kaifeng Parachute Tower commenced in September 1955 and concluded in June 1956.In the 1980s, the modernization of aerial armaments led to the cancellation of parachute jumping events in sports competitions, resulting in the gradual obsolescence of the Kaifeng Parachute Tower retired from the historical arena. In October 2019, the Kaifeng Parachute Tower was included in the eighth batch of Major cultural heritage sites under national-level protection. A nearby primary school was once named after the tower, named "San Ta Primary School", which was closed on August 29, 2024.

== Framework ==
The Kaifeng Umbrella Tower is a cylindrical reinforced concrete edifice featuring a lotus flower-shaped apex. It encompasses an area of approximately 66,667 square meters, with a floor area of about 295 square meters. The tower reaches a height of approximately 85 meters, while the steel arm extends to about 75 meters. The tower platform is situated at a height of around 58 meter.
