= Nancai =

Nancai Town 南彩镇
- Town
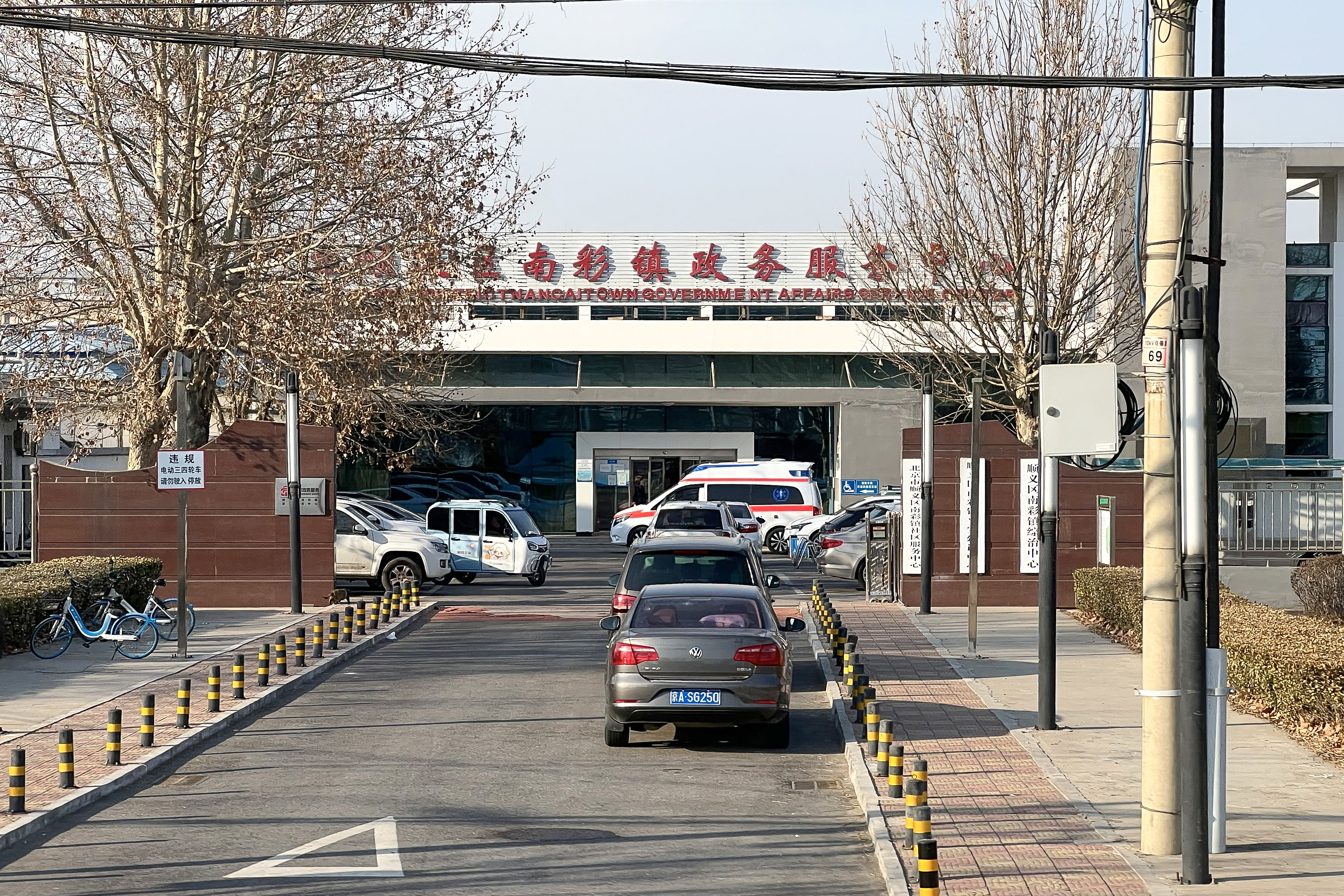

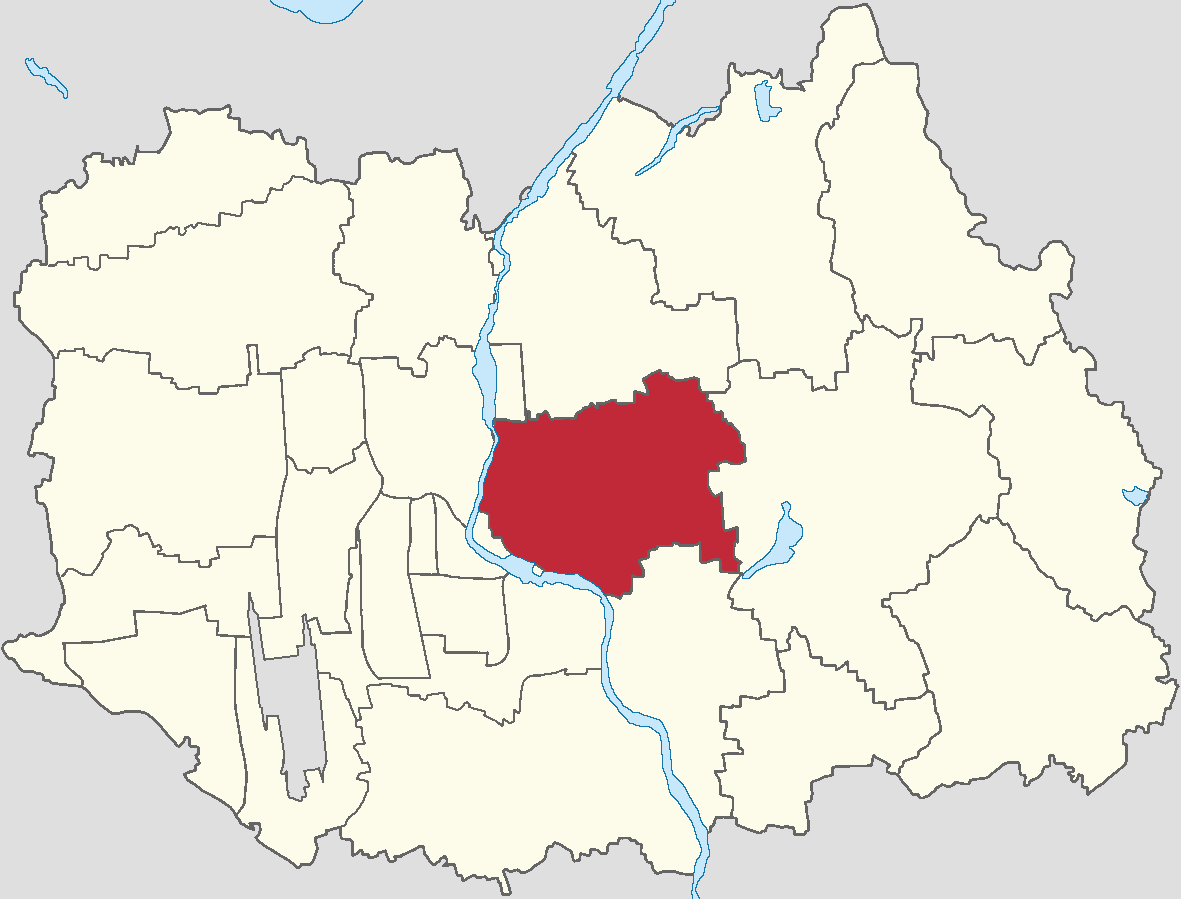
- Location of Nancai Town within Shunyi District

- Location within Beijing Location within China
- Coordinates: 40°07′58″N 116°42′19″E
- Country: China
- Municipality: Beijing
- District: Shunyi
- Village-level Divisions: 1 communities 26 villages

Area
  - Total: 56.22 km^{2} (21.71 sq mi)
- Elevation: 33 m (108 ft)

Population (2020)
  - Total: 73,163
  - Density: 1,301/km^{2} (3,371/sq mi)
- Time zone: UTC+8 (China Standard)
- Postal code: 101300
- Area code: 010

Nancai Town (simplified Chinese: 南彩镇; traditional Chinese: 南彩鎮; pinyin: Náncái Zhèn) is a town situated at the center of Shunyi District, Beijing. It is located south of Beixiaoying Town, west of Yang Town, North of Lisui and Renhe Towns, and east of Shuangfeng Subdistrict. It had 73,163 inhabitants within its borders in 2020.

The town's name came from Cai Village that used to exist in the area, which was later split into north and south villages during the Yuan dynasty.

== History ==
History of Nancai Town
Time	Status	Under
1912–1949	Yuxinzhuang	Miyun County
1912–1949	Daxingzhuang	Sanhe County
1949–1958	7th District	Shunyi County
1958–1962	Wuli Management District, part of Yanggezhuang People's Commune	Shunyi County
1962–1983	Nancai People's Commune	Shunyi County
1983–1989	Nancai Township	Shunyi County
1989–1998	Nancai Town (Incorporated Fengbo Township in 1997)	Shunyi County
1998–present	Nancai Town (Incorporated Fengbo Township in 1997)	Shunyi District

== Administrative divisions ==
In 2021, There were 27 subdivisions within Nancai Town, consisted of 1 community and 26 villages:

Administrative division code	Subdivision names	Name transliteration	Type
110113106001	彩丰	Caifeng	Community
110113106201	前薛各庄	Qian Xuegezhuang	Village
110113106202	后薛各庄	Hou Xuegezhuang	Village
110113106203	南彩	Nancai	Village
110113106204	坞里	Wuli	Village
110113106205	双营	Shuangying	Village
110113106206	南小营	Nan Xiaoying	Village
110113106207	洼里	Wali	Village
110113106208	望渠	Wangqu	Village
110113106209	道仙庄	Daoxianzhuang	Village
110113106210	东江头	Dong Jiangtou	Village
110113106211	西江头	Xi Jiangtou	Village
110113106212	于辛庄	Yuxinzhuang	Village
110113106213	大兴庄	Daxingzhuang	Village
110113106214	太平庄	Taipingzhuang	Village
110113106215	水屯	Shuitun	Village
110113106216	九王庄	Jiuwangzhuang	Village
110113106217	前俸伯	Qian Fengbo	Village
110113106218	后俸伯	Hou Fengbo	Village
110113106219	河北村	Hebeicun	Village
110113106220	杜刘庄	Duliuzhuang	Village
110113106221	北彩	Beicai	Village
110113106222	柳行	Liuxing	Village
110113106223	黄家场	Huangjiachang	Village
110113106224	桥头	Qiaotou	Village
110113106225	前郝家疃	Qian Hejiatuan	Village
110113106226	后郝家疃	Hou Hejiatuan	Village

== See also ==
- List of township-level divisions of Beijing
