= Mapo, Beijing =

Mapo Town 马坡镇
- Town
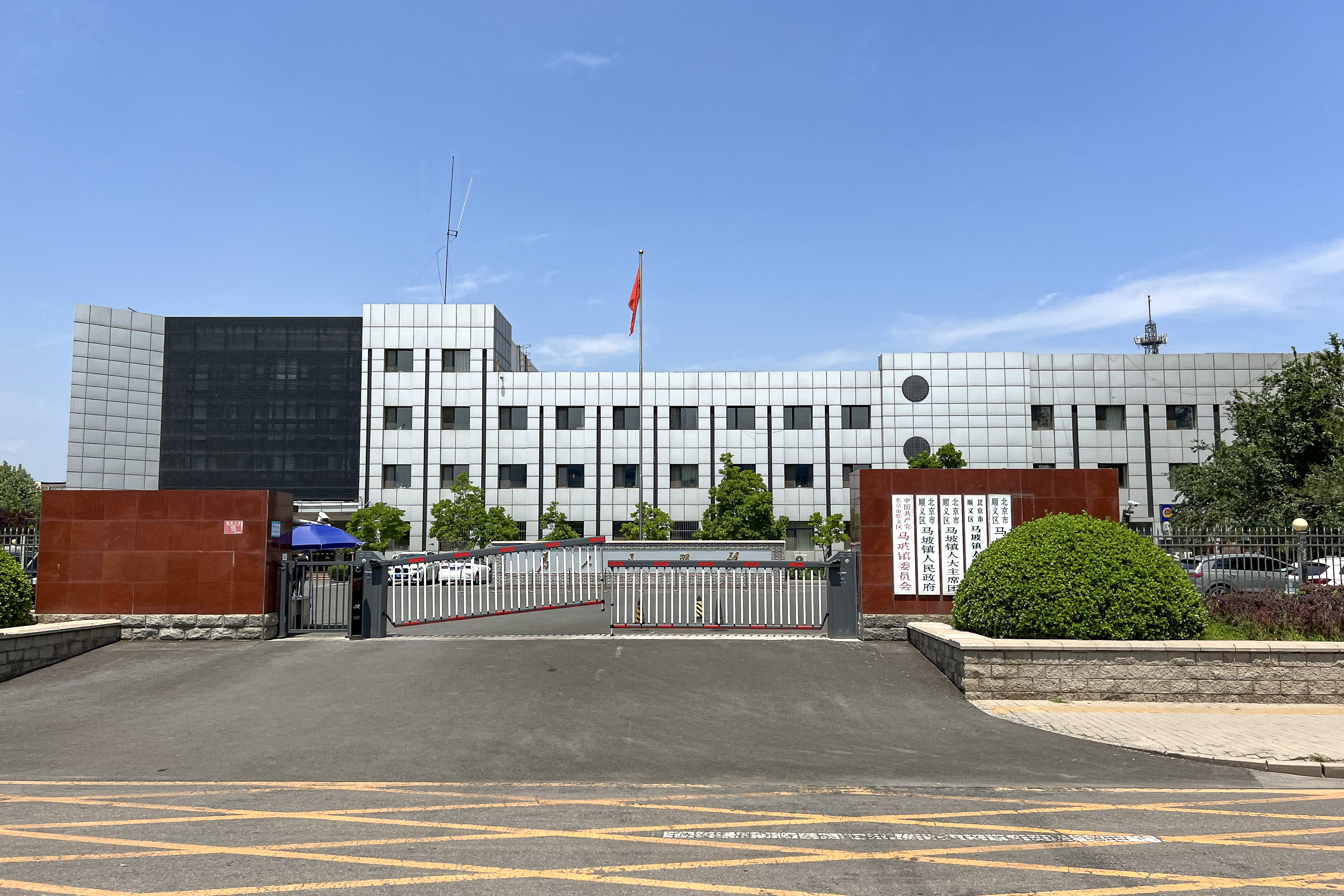

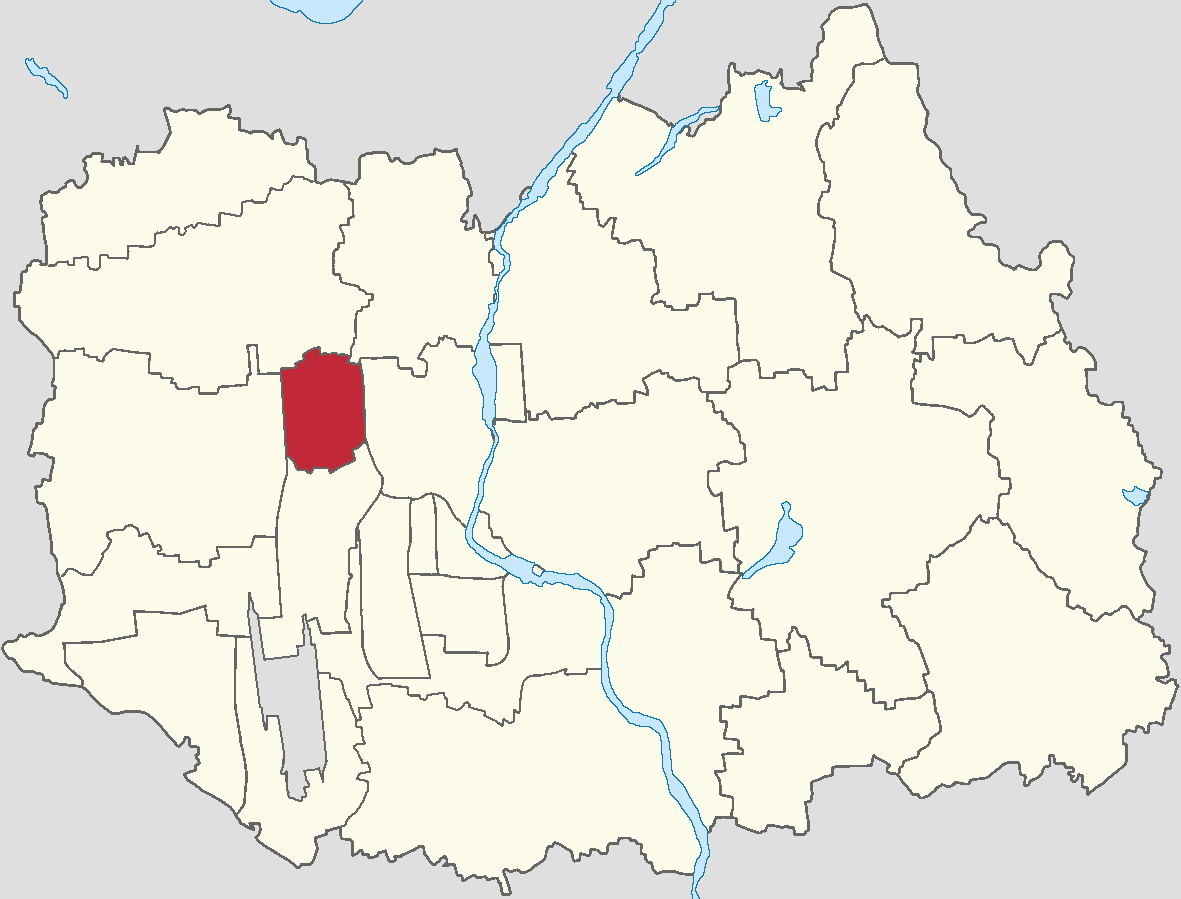
- Location of Mapo Town within Shunyi District

- Location within Beijing Location within China
- Coordinates: 40°10′27″N 116°35′14″E
- Country: China
- Municipality: Beijing
- District: Shunyi
- Village-level Divisions: 4 communities 7 villages

Area
  - Total: 13.14 km^{2} (5.07 sq mi)
- Elevation: 43 m (141 ft)

Population (2020)
  - Total: 38,547
  - Density: 2,934/km^{2} (7,598/sq mi)
- Time zone: UTC+8 (China Standard)
- Postal code: 101300
- Area code: 010

Mapo Town (Chinese: 马坡镇; pinyin: Mǎpō Zhèn) is a town located near the northwest corner of Shunyi District, Beijing, China. It borders Zhaoquanying and Niulanshan Towns to the north, Shuangfeng Subdistrict to the east, Nanfaxin Town to the south, and Gaoliying Town to the west. In 2020, it was home to 38,547 residents.

The name Mapo (Chinese: 马坡; lit. 'Horse Slope') is derived from the town's historical location as a horse farm during the Ming dynasty and near the Po Hill.

== History ==
Timeline of Mapo Town
| Year | Status | Under |
|---|---|---|
| 1912–1949 | 1st District | Shunyi County |
| 1949–1950 | 11th District | Shunyi County |
| 1950–1953 | 1st District | Shunyi County |
| 1953–1958 | Mapo Township | Shunyi County |
| 1958–1970 | Mapo Management District, part of Chengguan People's Commune | Shunyi County |
| 1970–1983 | Mapo People's Commune | Shunyi County |
| 1983–1998 | Mapo Township | Shunyi County |
| 1998–1999 | Mapo Area | Shunyi District |
| 1999–present | Mapo Area (Mapo Town) | Shunyi District |

== Administrative divisions ==
In the year 2021, Mapo Town consisted of 11 subdivisions, more specifically 4 communities and 7 villages:

| Administrative division code | Subdivision names | Name transliteration | Type |
|---|---|---|---|
| 110113009001 | 佳和宜园第一 | Jiahe Yiyuan Diyi | Community |
| 110113009002 | 佳和宜园第二 | Jiahe Yiyuan Di'er | Community |
| 110113009003 | 中晟馨苑北区 | Zhongsheng Xinyuan Beiqu | Community |
| 110113009004 | 泰和宜园西区 | Taihe Yiyuan Xiqu | Community |
| 110113009214 | 良正卷 | Liangzhengjuan | Village |
| 110113009215 | 庙卷村 | Miaojuancun | Village |
| 110113009216 | 衙门 | Yamen | Village |
| 110113009218 | 石家营 | Shijiaying | Village |
| 110113009219 | 毛家营 | Maojiaying | Village |
| 110113009220 | 姚店 | Yaodian | Village |
| 110113009221 | 马卷 | Majuan | Village |

== See also ==
- List of township-level divisions of Beijing
