= Nanfaxin =

Nanfaxin may refer to:

- Nanfaxin Station, Beijing Subway, China
- Nanfaxin, Beijing, in Shunyi District, Beijing, China
