= Sun Village =

Non-governmental organization

- Formation: 1995
- Founder: Zhang Shuqin
- Type: Non Government Organization (NGO)
- Purpose: Orphanage
- Headquarters: Shunyi District, Beijing

Sun Village (simplified Chinese: 太阳村; traditional Chinese: 太陽村; pinyin: Tàiyangcūn) is a non-governmental organization that operates a series of orphanages set up for children who have parents convicted in the Chinese criminal justice system and who have no other family or guardians available to care for them. It is headquartered in Shunyi District, Beijing.

A former prison guard, Zhang Shuqin (张淑琴), usually known as "Grandma Zhang" created the institution in 1995. In 2016 there were nine centers; at the time it was not yet on the official roster of nongovernmental organizations.

Kaspar Astrup Schröder created the documentary Children of Chinese Prisoners about the centers. Additionally Zoey Lee and Matt Belbin created their own documentary.
