= Zhaoquanying =

Zhaoquanying Town 赵全营镇
- Town
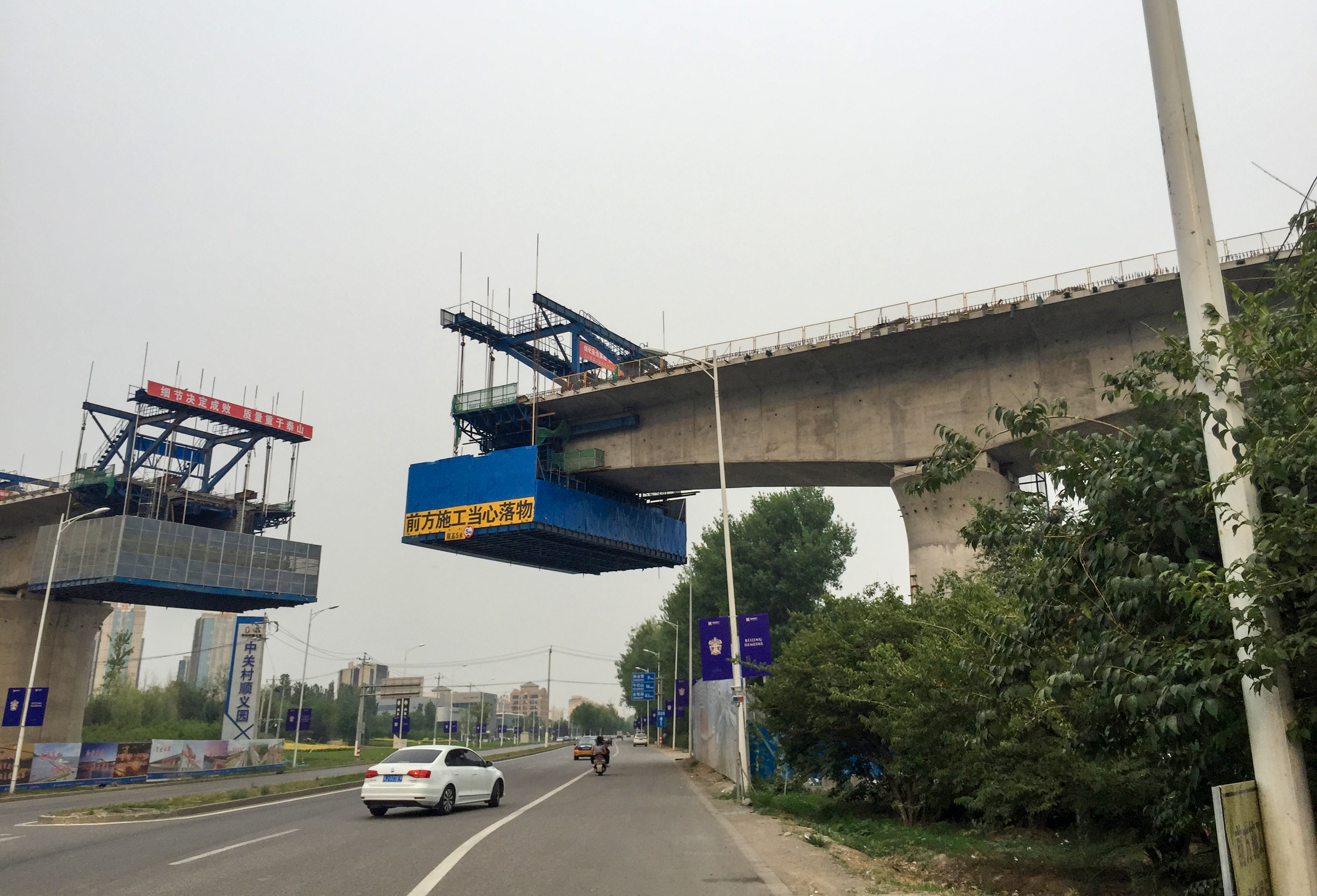
- Construction of Beijing–Shenyang high-speed railway in the town, 2017

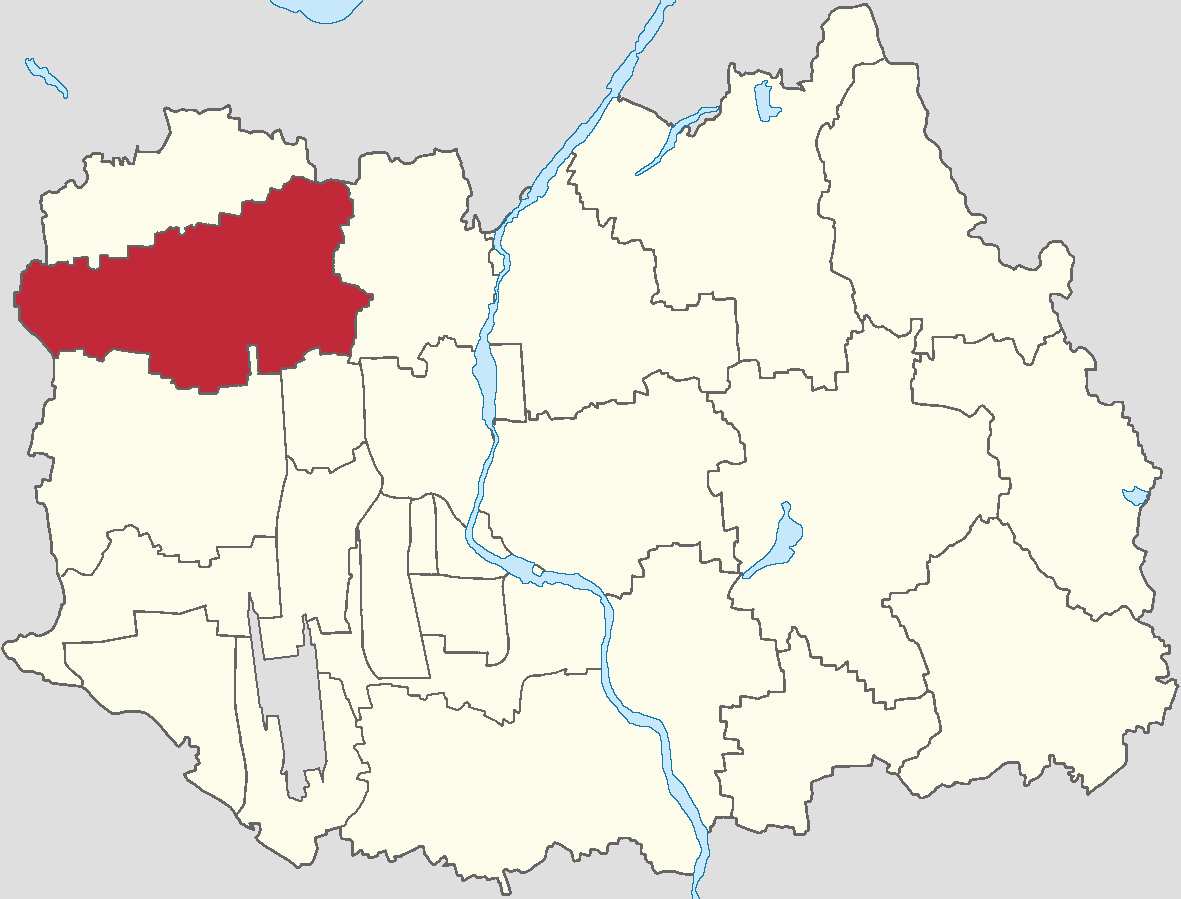
- Location of Zhaoquanying Town within Shunyi District

- Location within Beijing Location within China
- Coordinates: 40°12′45″N 116°35′04″E
- Country: China
- Municipality: Beijing
- District: Shunyi
- Village-level Divisions: 1 communities 25 villages

Area
  - Total: 64.43 km^{2} (24.88 sq mi)
- Elevation: 48 m (157 ft)

Population (2020)
  - Total: 47,206
  - Density: 732.7/km^{2} (1,898/sq mi)
- Time zone: UTC+8 (China Standard)
- Postal code: 101301
- Area code: 010

Zhaoquanying Town (simplified Chinese: 赵全营镇; traditional Chinese: 趙全營鎮; pinyin: Zhàoquányíng Zhèn) is a town located on northwestern side of Shunyi District, Beijing. It borders Beishicao and Miaocheng Towns to its north, Niulanshan Town to its east, Mapo and Gaoliying Towns to its south, and Xingshou Town to its west. Its total population was 47,206 in 2020.

== History ==
Timetable of Zhaoquanying Town
Year	Status	Under
1958–1973	Beilangzhong Management District, part of Niulanshan People's Commune	Shunyi County
1973–1983	Zhaoquanying People's Commune	Shunyi County
1983–1997	Zhaoquanying Township	Shunyi County
1997–1998	Zhaoquanying Town (Incorporated Banqiao Township in 1997)	Shunyi County
1998–present	Zhaoquanying Town (Incorporated Banqiao Township in 1997)	Shunyi District

== Administrative divisions ==
In the year 2021, Zhaoquanying Town covered 26 subdivisions, including 1 community and 25 villages:

Administrative division code	Subdivision names	Name transliteration	Type
110113116001	板桥新苑	Banqiao Xinyuan	Community
110113116201	西小营	Xixiaoying	Village
110113116202	北郎中	Beilangzhong	Village
110113116203	前桑园	Qian Sangyuan	Village
110113116204	后桑园	Hou Sangyuan	Village
110113116205	白庙	Baimiao	Village
110113116206	马家堡	Majiabao	Village
110113116207	大官庄	Da Guanzhuang	Village
110113116208	小官庄	Xiao Guanzhuang	Village
110113116209	西陈各庄	Xi Chengezhuang	Village
110113116210	赵全营	Zhaoquanying	Village
110113116211	小高丽村	Xiao Gaolicun	Village
110113116212	去碑营	Qubeiying	Village
110113116213	豹房	Baofang	Village
110113116214	忻州营	Xizhouying	Village
110113116215	红铜营	Hongtongying	Village
110113116216	板桥	Banqiao	Village
110113116217	西绛州营村	Xi Jiangzhouying Cun	Village
110113116218	东绛洲营村	Dong Jiangzhouying Cun	Village
110113116219	稷山营	Jishanying	Village
110113116220	东水泉	Dong Shuiquan	Village
110113116221	西水泉	Xi Shuiquan	Village
110113116222	联庄	Lianzhuang	Village
110113116223	河庄	Hezhuang	Village
110113116224	解放	Jiefang	Village
110113116225	燕华营	Yanhuaying	Village

== See also ==
- List of township-level divisions of Beijing
