= Pinnacle Plaza =

Shopping complex in Beijing, China

Pinnacle Plaza (荣祥广场) is a shopping complex located in the Shunyi District of Beijing, China. It is located nearby to several housing complexes. It houses several restaurants including a Burger King, Starbucks and Domino's Pizza. Pinnacle Plaza is also located close to schools such as International School of Beijing and the British School of Beijing. Pinnacle Plaza is a place where the expats living in Beijing usually are because of the foreign supermarket and proximity to housing complexes near Pinnacle Plaza.
