= Lisui =

Lisui Town 李遂镇
- Town
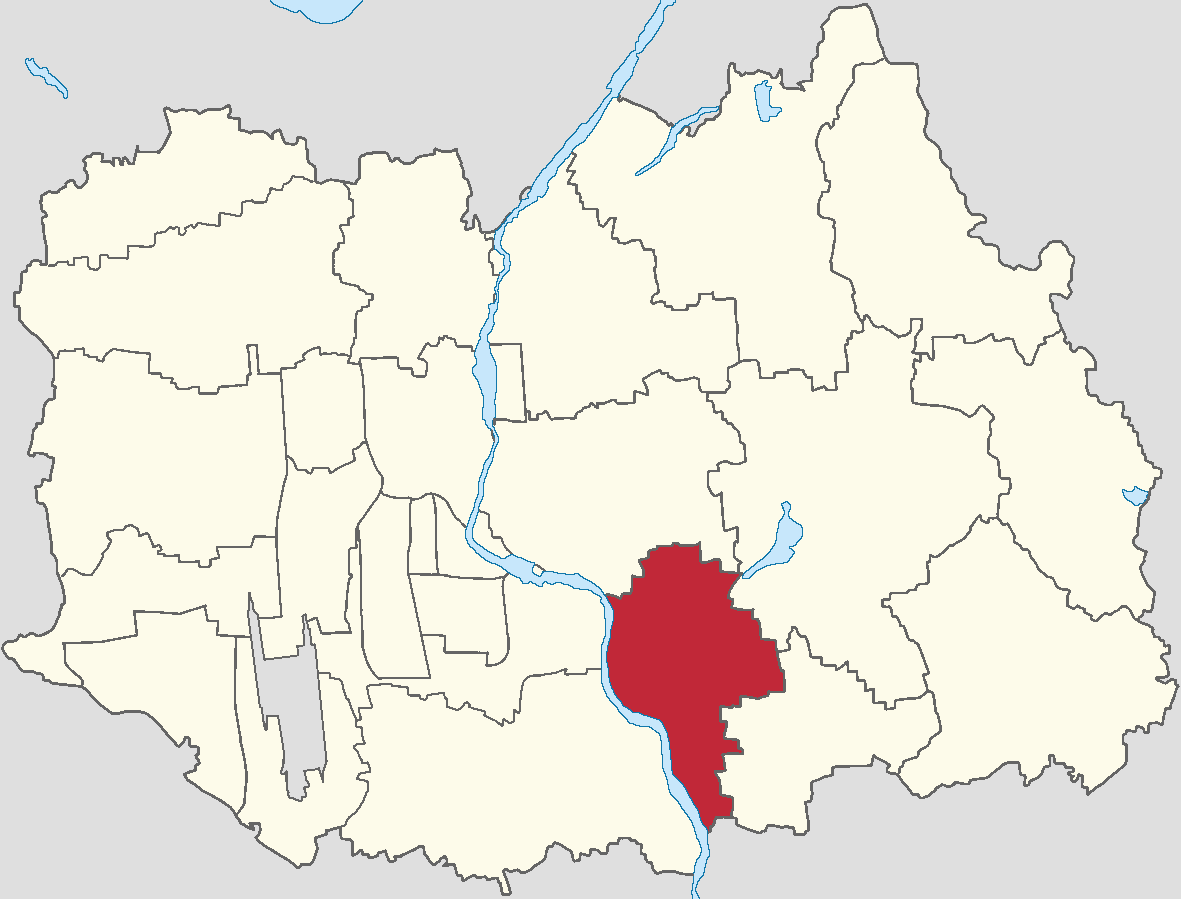
- Location of Lisui Town within Shunyi District

- Location within Beijing Location within China
- Coordinates: 40°04′53″N 116°45′26″E
- Country: China
- Municipality: Beijing
- District: Shunyi
- Village-level Divisions: 16 villages

Area
  - Total: 40.17 km^{2} (15.51 sq mi)
- Elevation: 30 m (98 ft)

Population (2020)
  - Total: 22,538
  - Density: 561.1/km^{2} (1,453/sq mi)
- Time zone: UTC+8 (China Standard)
- Postal code: 101313
- Area code: 010

Lisui Town (simplified Chinese: 李遂镇; traditional Chinese: 李遂鎮; pinyin: Lǐsuì Zhèn) is a town situated on the southern portion of Shunyi District, Beijing. It shares border with Nancai Town to the north, Yang and Beiwu Towns to the east, Yanjiao Town to the south, Liqiao and Renhe Towns to the west. It had 22,538 people under its administration in 2020.

The town can be traced back to the Liao dynasty, and its name Lisui came from large number of residents having the surname Li, and its location near the Baisui River (now known as Bai River).

== History ==
History of Lisui Town
| Time | Status | Within |
|---|---|---|
| 1912–1928 | 2nd District | Shunyi County |
| 1928–1946 | 3rd District | Shunyi County |
| 1946–1949 | 7th District | Shunyi County |
| 1949–1950 | 7th District 4th Districts | Shunyi County |
| 1950–1956 | 6th District | Shunyi County |
| 1956–1958 | Lisui Township Pailou Township | Shunyi County |
| 1958–1983 | Lisui People's Commune | Shunyi County |
| 1983–1989 | Lisui Township | Shunyi County |
| 1989–1998 | Lisui Town | Shunyi County |
| 1998–present | Lisui Town | Shunyi District |

== Administrative divisions ==
As of 2021, Lisui Town covered the 16 following villages:

| Administrative division code | Subdivision names | Name transliteration |
|---|---|---|
| 110113105201 | 宣庄户 | Xuanzhuanghu |
| 110113105202 | 魏辛庄 | Weixinzhuang |
| 110113105203 | 后营 | Houying |
| 110113105204 | 前营 | Qianying |
| 110113105205 | 葛代子 | Gedaizi |
| 110113105206 | 沟北 | Goubei |
| 110113105207 | 柳各庄 | Liugezhuang |
| 110113105208 | 李遂 | Lisui |
| 110113105209 | 西营 | Xiying |
| 110113105210 | 东营 | Dongying |
| 110113105211 | 李庄 | Lizhuang |
| 110113105212 | 崇国庄 | Chongguozhuang |
| 110113105213 | 陈庄 | Chenzhuang |
| 110113105214 | 赵庄 | Zhaozhuang |
| 110113105215 | 太平辛庄 | Taipingxinzhuang |
| 110113105216 | 牌楼 | Pailou |

== See also ==
- List of township-level divisions of Beijing
