= Beiwu =

Beiwu Town 北务镇
- Town
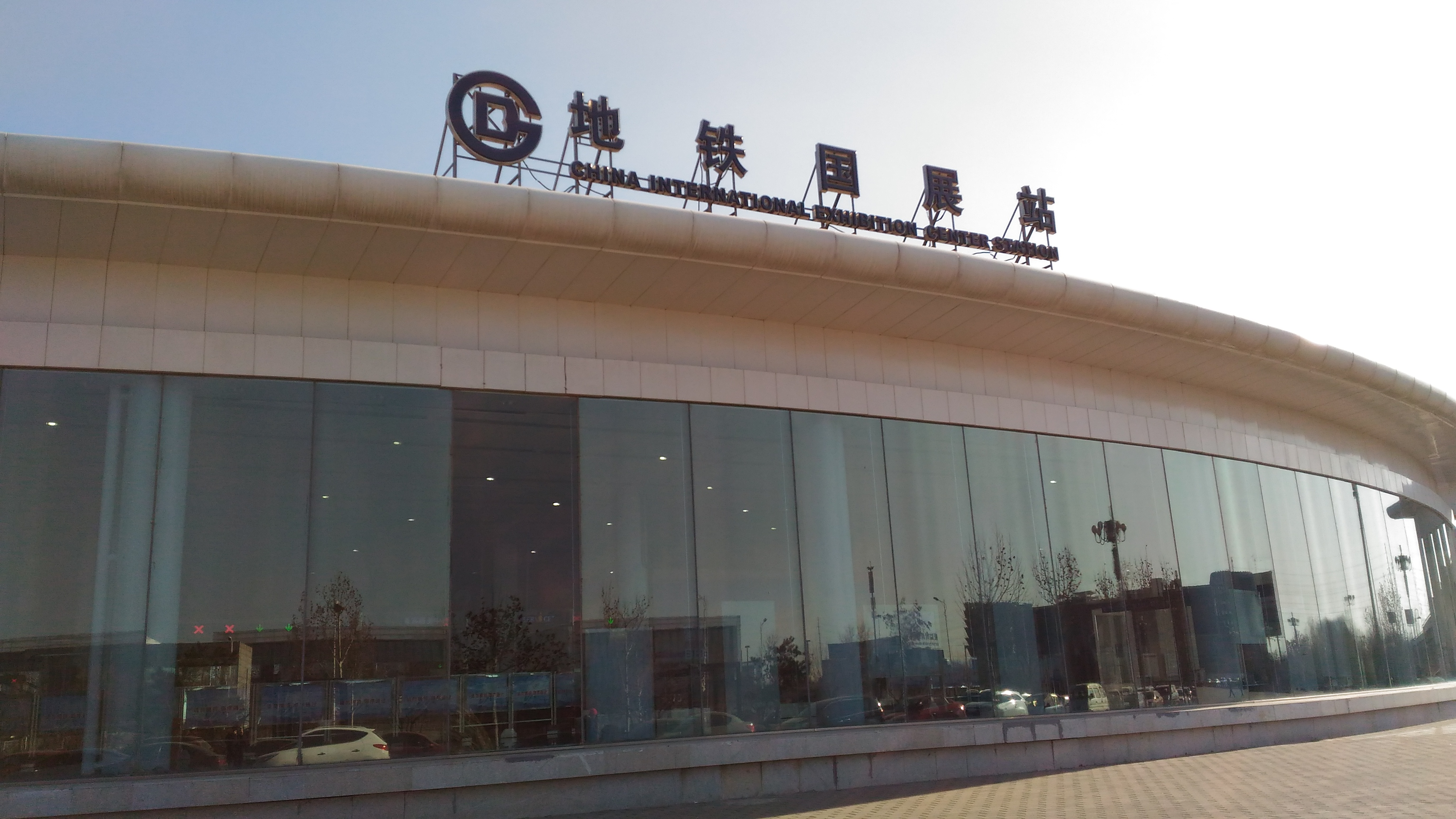
- China International Exhibition Center Station, 2016

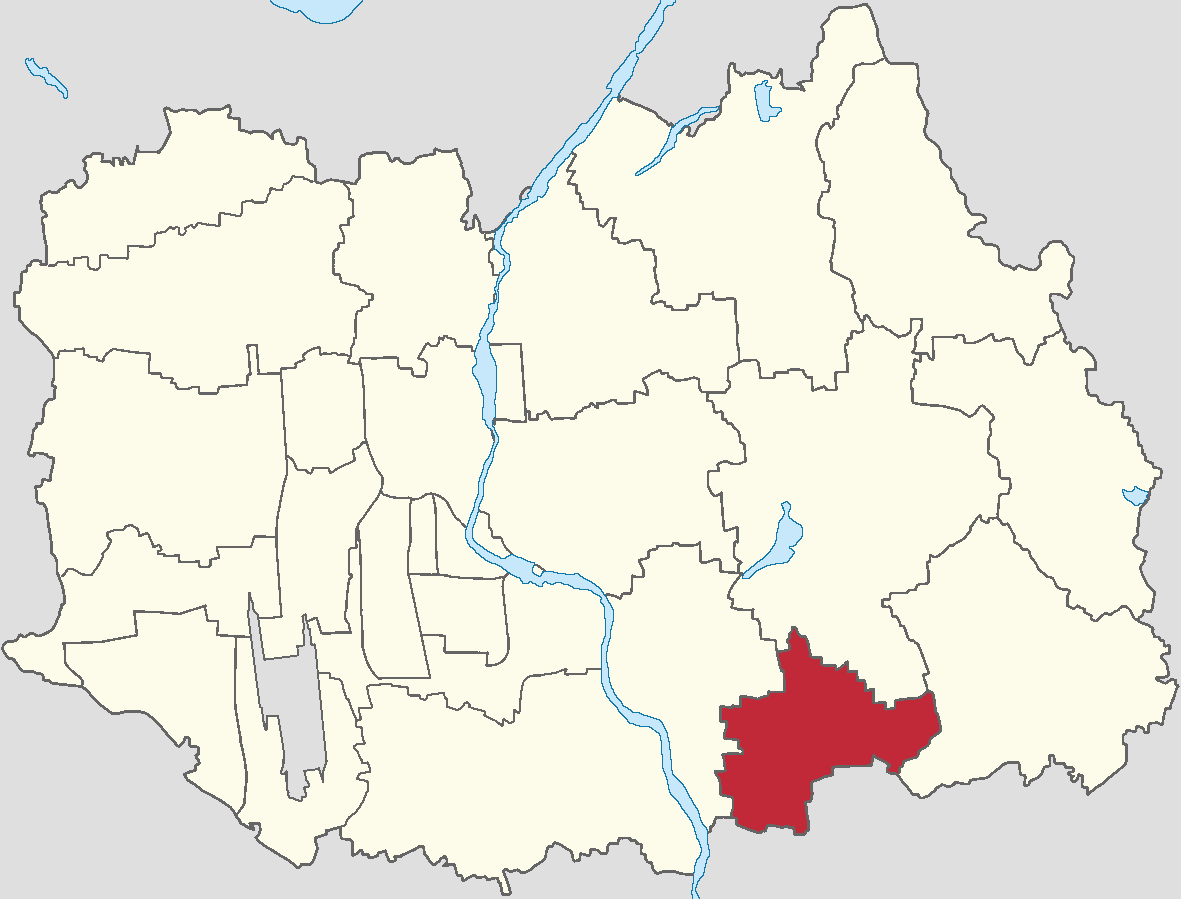
- Location of Beiwu Town within Shunyi District

- Location within Beijing Location within China
- Coordinates: 40°04′09″N 116°49′22″E
- Country: China
- Municipality: Beijing
- District: Shunyi
- Village-level Divisions: 15 villages

Area
  - Total: 32.19 km^{2} (12.43 sq mi)
- Elevation: 36 m (118 ft)

Population (2020)
  - Total: 13,980
  - Density: 434.3/km^{2} (1,125/sq mi)
- Time zone: UTC+8 (China Standard)
- Postal code: 101399
- Area code: 010

Beiwu Town (simplified Chinese: 北务镇; traditional Chinese: 北務鎮; pinyin: Běiwù Zhèn) is a town on the southern portion of Shunyi District, Beijing. It shares border with Yang Town to the north, Dasungezhuang Town to the east, Gaolou and Yanjiao Towns to the south, and Lisui Town to the west. The town was home to a population of 13,980 according to the 2020 census.

== History ==
Timetable of Beiwu Town
Time	Status	Under
1912–1949	3rd District	Shunyi County
1949–1950	4th District	Shunyi County
1950–1956	6th District	Shunyi County
1956–1958	Beiwu Township	Shunyi County
1958–1961	Beiwu Management District, part of Beiwu People's Commune	Shunyi County
1961–1983	Beiwu People's Commune	Shunyi County
1983–1994	Beiwu Township	Shunyi County
1994–1998	Beiwu Town	Shunyi County
1998–present	Beiwu Town	Shunyi District

== Administrative divisions ==
In 2021, Beiwu Town was composed of 15 villages:

Administrative division code	Subdivision names	Name transliteration
110113108201	北务	Beiwu
110113108202	郭家务	Guojiawu
110113108203	陈辛庄	Chenxinzhuang
110113108204	林上	Linshang
110113108205	仓上	Cangshang
110113108206	道口	Daokou
110113108207	王各庄	Wanggezhuang
110113108208	闫家渠	Yanjiaqu
110113108209	南辛庄户	Nan Xinzhuanghu
110113108210	于地	Yudi
110113108211	庄子	Zhuangzi
110113108212	小珠宝	Xiaozhubao
110113108213	东地	Dongdi
110113108214	珠宝屯	Zhubaotun
110113108215	马庄	Mazhuang

== Gallery ==
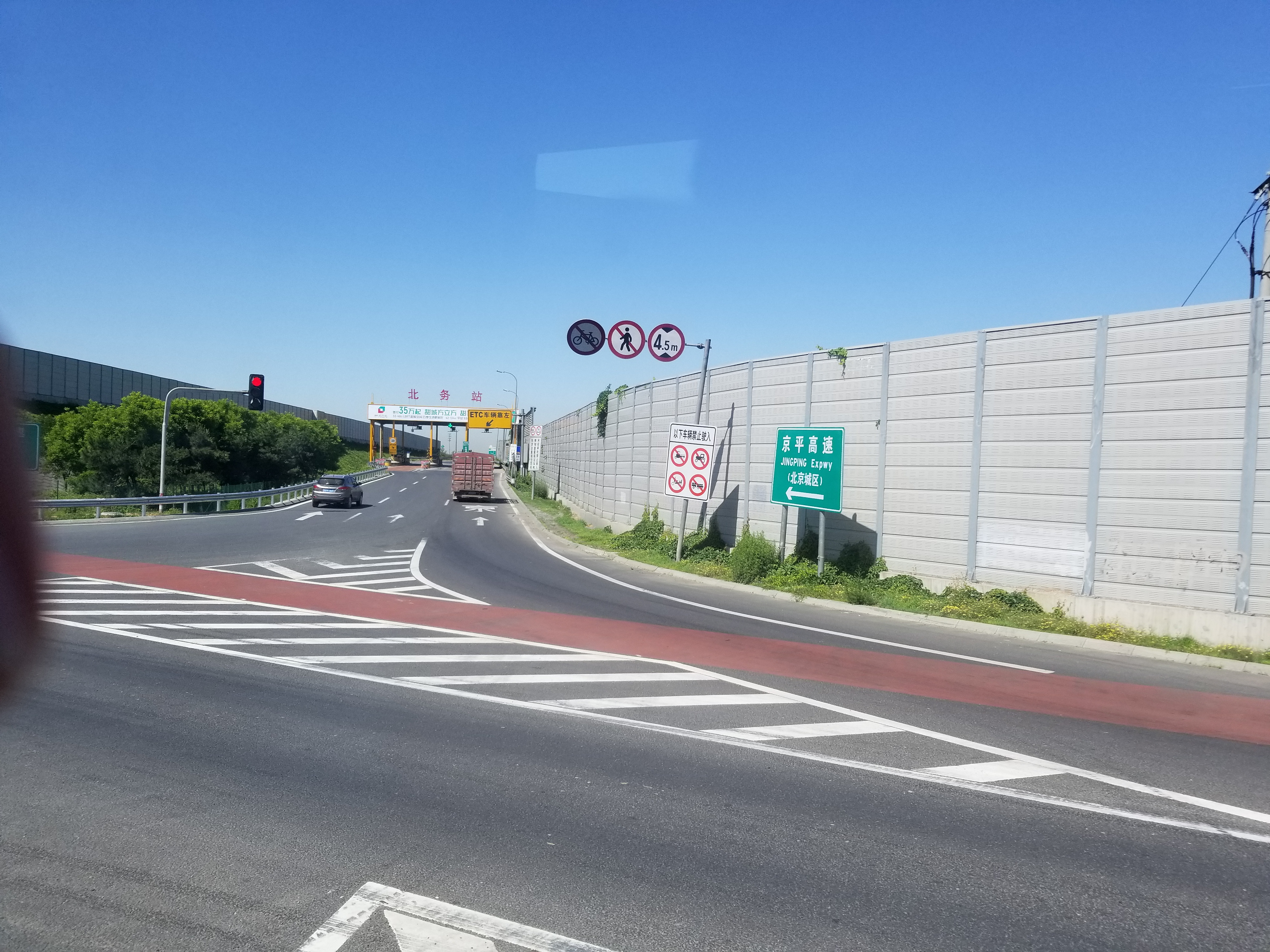
Jingping Expressway passing through the south of the town

== See also ==
- List of township-level divisions of Beijing
