= Shunyi, Beijing =

Shunyi 顺义区
- District
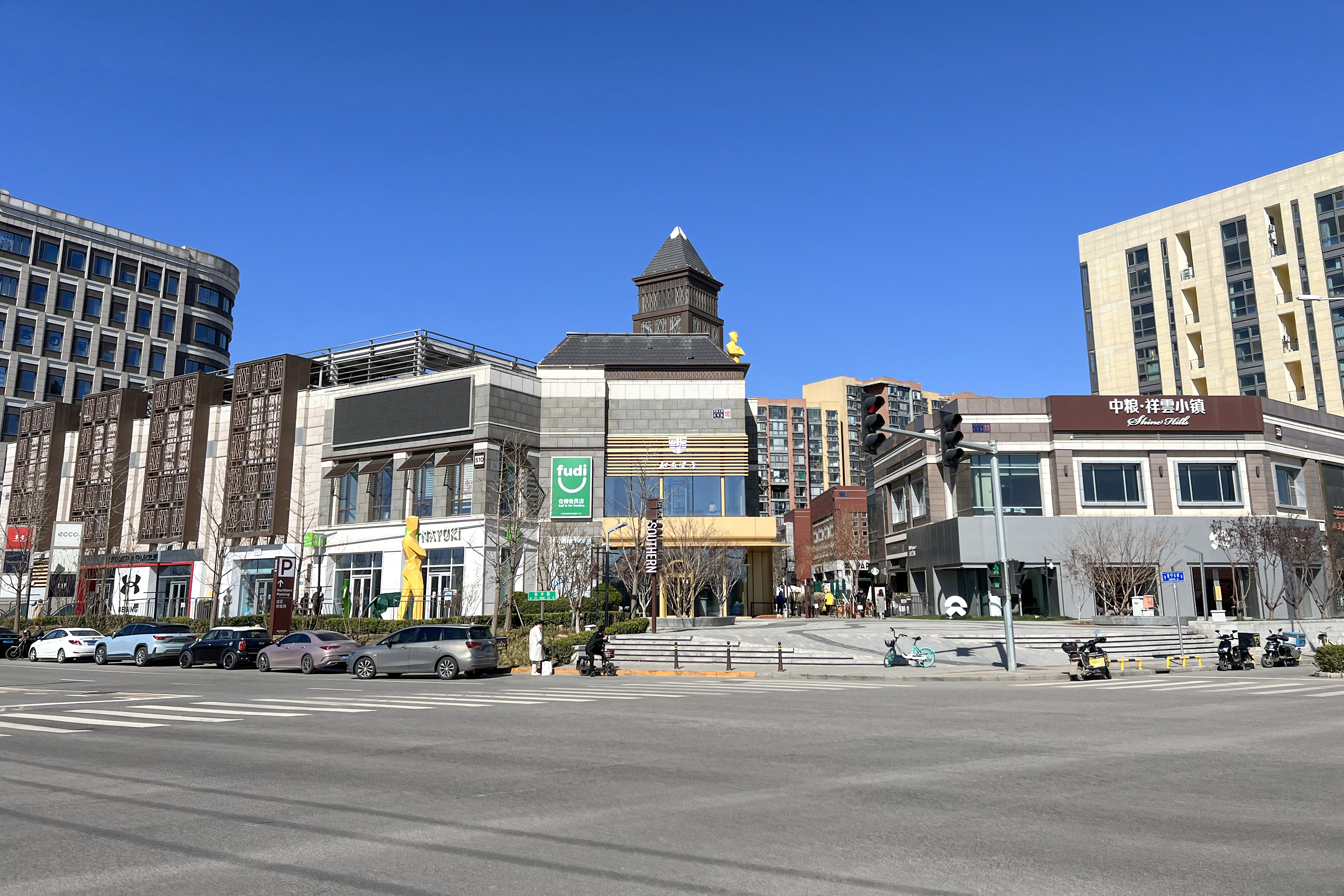
- COFCO Shine Hills

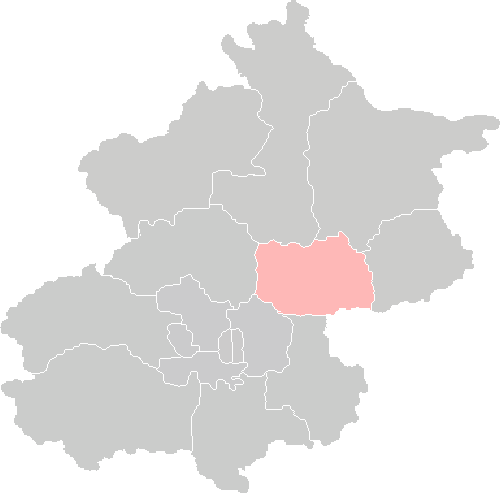
- Location of Shunyi District in Beijing
- Coordinates (Shunyi District government): 40°09′00″N 116°39′41″E
- Country: People's Republic of China
- Municipality: Beijing
- Township-level divisions: 6 subdistricts; 19 towns

Area
  - Total: 1,020 km^{2} (390 sq mi)

Population (2020)
  - Total: 1,324,044
  - Density: 1,300/km^{2} (3,360/sq mi)
- Time zone: UTC+8 (China Standard)
- Area code: 0010

Shunyi District (Chinese: 顺义区; pinyin: Shùnyì Qū) is a district of Beijing. Shunyi borders the Beijing districts of Pinggu to the east, Tongzhou to the south, Chaoyang to the southwest, Changping to the west, Huairou to the north, and Miyun to the northeast, as well as Hebei province to the southeast.

Shunyi has large expatriate communities.

== Overview ==
Shunyi District has an area of 1,020 km^{2} (390 sq mi) and a long-term resident population of approximately 983,000 as of 2013. The district is divided into 5 subdistricts of the city of Shunyi, the Airport subdistrict, and 19 towns. The urban area of Shunyi (2000 Census population 104,952 in Subdistricts) has an area of 19 km^{2} (7.3 sq mi) and has an estimated urban area population of 190,000. Other important urban areas include Tianzhu town/Jichang (55,000 estimated population; Jichang, or the Capital Airport Subdistrict, is an exclave of Chaoyang District surrounded by Shunyi District), Houshayu (45,000), Yangzhen (22,000), and Mapo (22,000).

The Tianzhu Development Zone region abutting the airport to the west contains the largest international exhibition center in China, the China International Exhibition Center.

The International School of Beijing (ISB) is located in Shunyi District in the region known as the "Beijing Central Villas District" - the area immediately to the south of the new International Exhibition Center - and more particularly just north of Yosemite Villas. Across the road from ISB is the new campus of the British School of Beijing, which moved to this location during the summer of 2009. From west to east, the villas include EuroVillage, River Garden, Le Leman Lake, Capital Paradise, Gahood, Yosemite and Dragon Bay Villa and Rose & Gingko. In addition to having many different housing complexes, there are also several small shopping malls nearby, including Europlaza, Pinnacle Plaza and Lakeview.

The Beijing 2008 Olympics rowing, canoeing, and kayaking events were held at the newly built Shunyi Olympic Rowing-Canoeing Park.

When Beijing Capital International Airport was first built, Shunyi was a subdistrict of Chaoyang. When Shunyi was promoted to full district status, Chaoyang maintained direct control over the airport, so although the airport is completely surrounded by Shunyi district, it is not administratively in Shunyi; it pays its taxes to the Chaoyang government.

== Administrative divisions ==
Shunyi is subdivided into 6 subdistricts and 19 towns.

Name	Chinese (S)	Hanyu Pinyin	Population (2010)	Area (km^{2})
Shengli Subdistrict	胜利街道	Shènglì Jiēdào	34,858	9.00
Guangming Subdistrict	光明街道	Guāngmíng Jiēdào	54,731	4.12
Shiyuan Subdistrict	石园街道	Shíyuán Jiēdào	48,531	9.60
Shuangfeng Subdistrict	双丰街道	Shuāngfēng Jiēdào	22,875	29.49
Wangquan Subdistrict	旺泉街道	Wàngquán Jiēdào	44,385	12.81
Konggang Subdistrict	空港街道	Kōnggǎng Jiēdào	43,814	26.98
Renhe town	仁和镇	Rénhé Zhèn	49,004	77.00
Houshayu town	后沙峪镇	Hòushāyù Zhèn	40,793	42.60
Tianzhu town	天竺镇	Tiānzhú Zhèn	33,342	42.00
Yang town	杨镇	Yáng Zhèn	54,406	96.00
Niulanshan town	牛栏山镇	Niúlánshān Zhèn	35,789	31.40
Nanfaxin town	南法信镇	Nánfǎxìn Zhèn	26,153	20.60
Mapo town	马坡镇	Mǎpō Zhèn	10,850	35.00
Gaoliying town	高丽营镇	Gāolí Zhèn	44,461	61.10
Liqiao town	李桥镇	Lǐqiáo Zhèn	69,830	75.00
Lisui town	李遂镇	Lǐsuì Zhèn	20,046	40.50
Nancai town	南彩镇	Náncǎi Zhèn	50,639	57.60
Beiwu town	北务镇	Běiwù Zhèn	11,413	32.00
Dasungezhuang town	大孙各庄镇	Dàsūngèzhuāng Zhèn	24,223	74.30
Zhang town	张镇	Zhāng Zhèn	23,636	54.00
Longwantun town	龙湾屯镇	Lóngwāntún Zhèn	15,457	56.60
Mulin town	木林镇	Mùlín Zhèn	33,557	83.00
Beixiaoying town	北小营镇	Běixiǎoyíng Zhèn	37,959	55.80
Beishicao town	北石槽镇	Běishícáo Zhèn	15,386	33.50
Zhaoquanying town	赵全营镇	Zhàoquányíng Zhèn	30,482	64.45

== Transport ==
The district is linked to the city proper through a series of arterial roads. The Northern Approach Route of the Airport Expressway passes through Shunyi District. Shunyi district is served by Line 15 of the Beijing Subway.

The urban center of Shunyi is near the 6th Ring Road.

=== Metro ===
Shunyi is currently served by two metro lines operated by Beijing Subway:

- Line 15 - China International Exhibition Center, Hualikan, Houshayu, Nanfaxin, Shimen, Shunyi, Fengbo
- Capital Airport Express - Terminal 3

== Economy ==
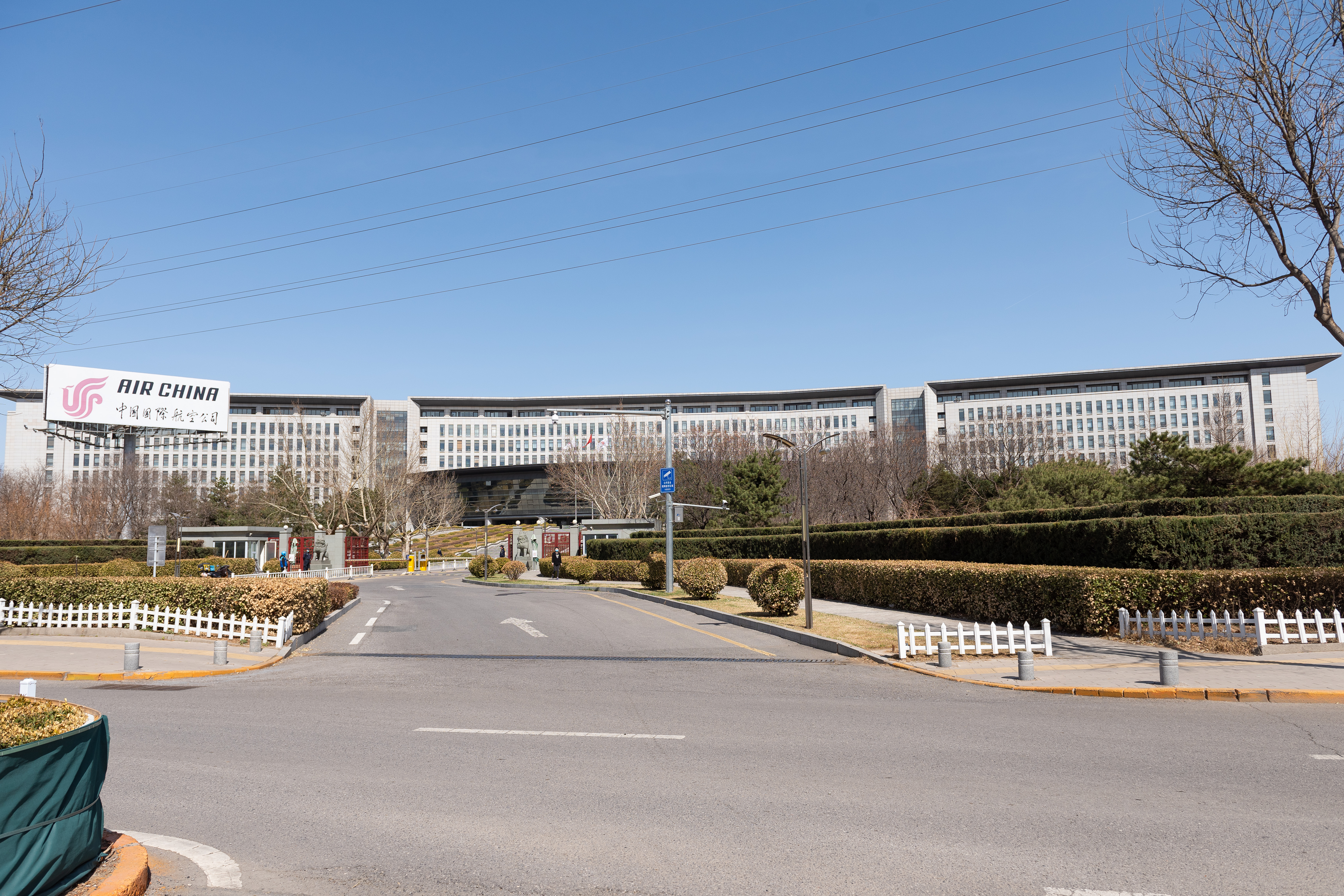
Air China HQ Building

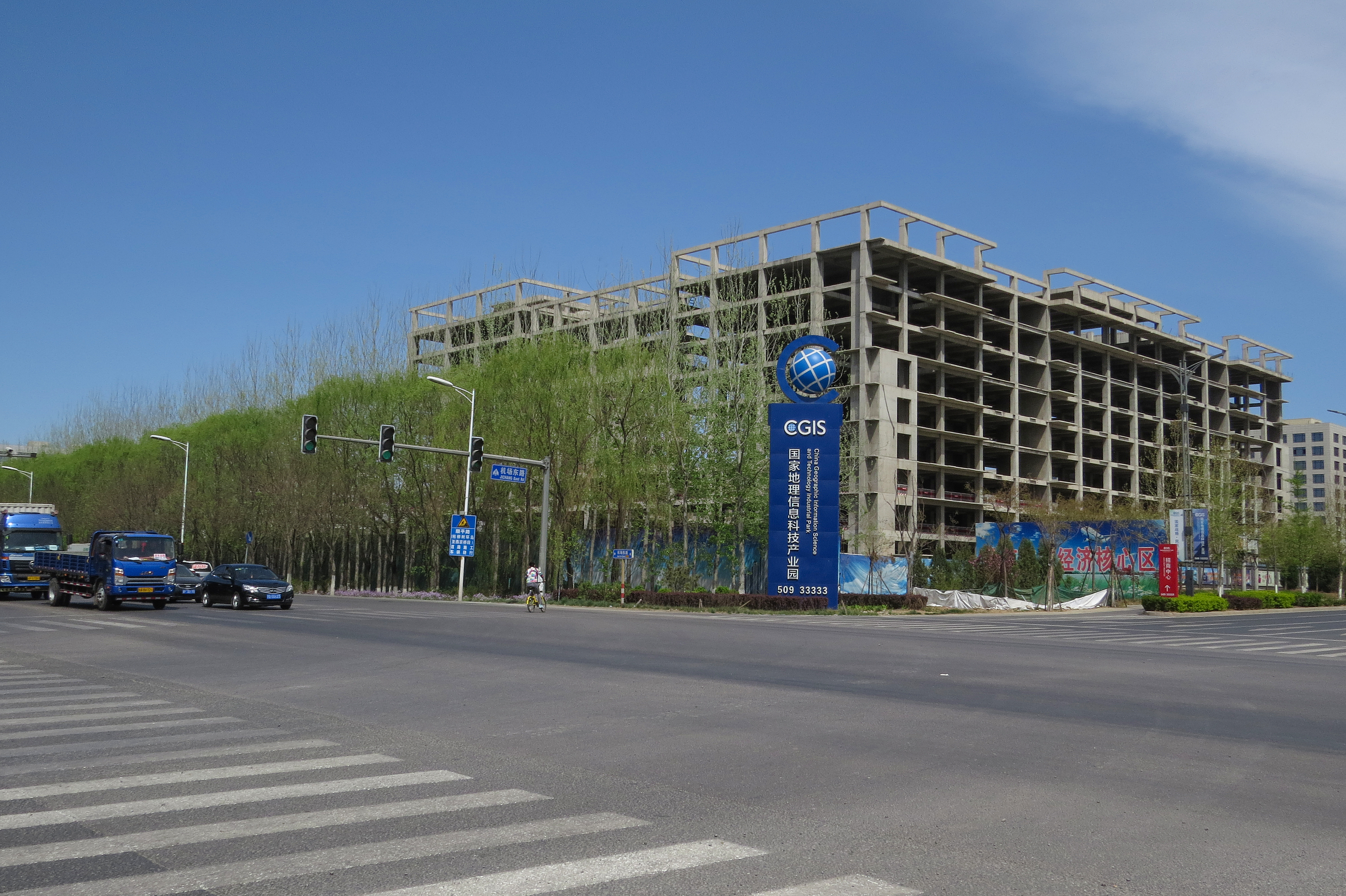
China Geographic Information Science and Technology Industrial Park

In 2017, the regional GDP of the district is 171.59 billion yuan, with GDP per capita at 152.1 thousand yuan.

Air China has its headquarters in Zone A of the Tianzhu Airport Industrial Zone (天竺空港工业区) in the Shunyi District. Okay Airways has its headquarters in a separate Air China facility.

Beijing Hyundai Motor Company, a joint-venture with Korean auto manufacturer Hyundai Motor Company and the Beijing Automotive Industry Holding Co. has its head office and factory in the Linhe Industrial Development Zone (林河工业开发区) in Shunyi District.

Ritchie Bros Auctioneers (Beijing) Co. Ltd. (利氏兄弟拍卖（北京）有限公司), a subsidiary of Ritchie Bros. Auctioneers of Canada, is an investor in the Tianzhu Free Trade Zone and is the first wholly foreign-owned auction company in China.

== Organisations and diplomatic missions ==
The warehouse of the Embassy of the United States, Beijing is located in the Beijing Tianzhu Airport Industrial Zone in Shunyi.

The International Civil Aviation Organization (ICAO) has its Asia & Pacific Regional Sub-Office (APAC RSO) in Shunyi.

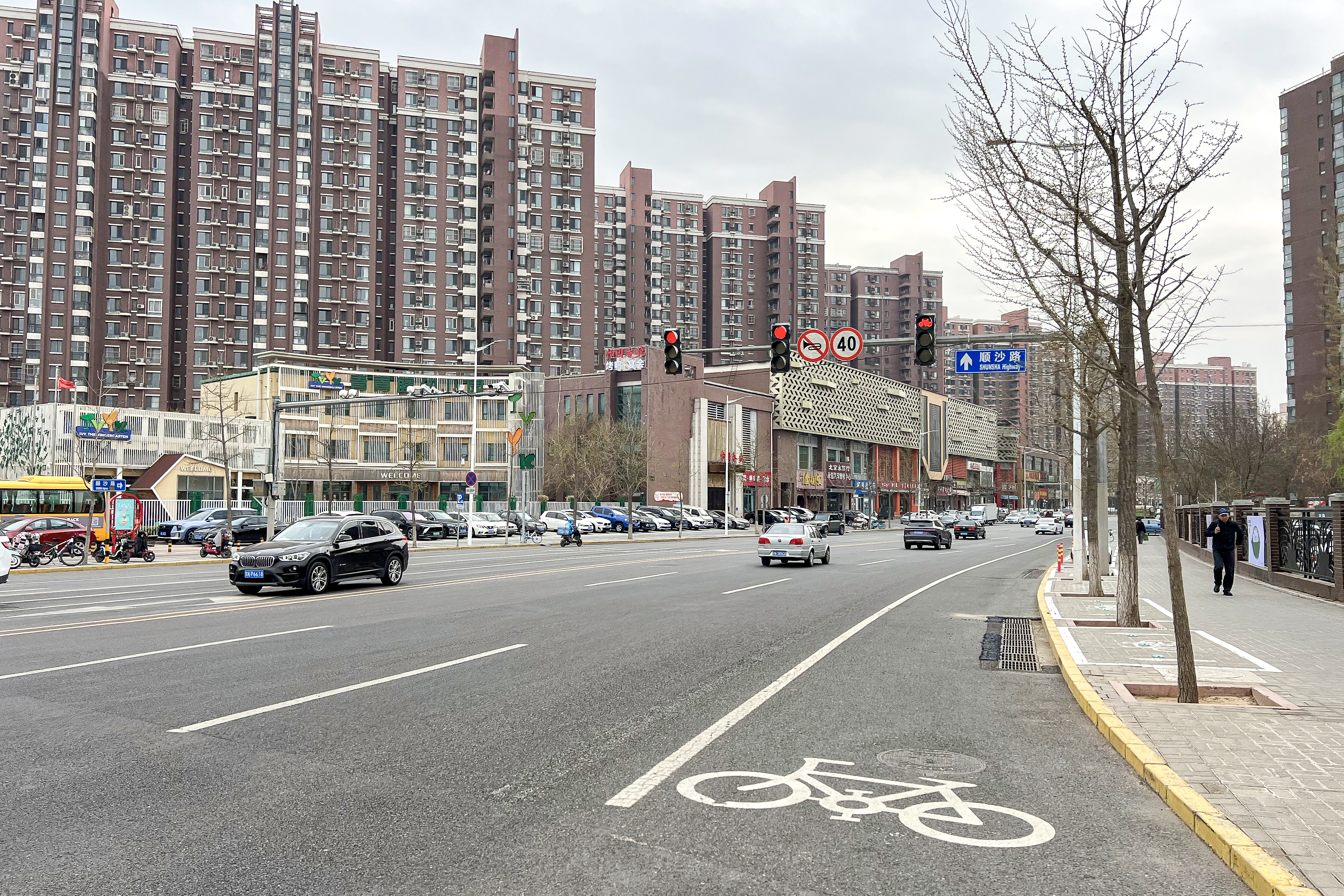
Start from Shunyi No. 8 Middle School.

== Education ==
Public high schools:

- Beijing Shunyi District No. 1 High School (北京市顺义区第一中学)
- Niulanshan No.1 High School
- Beijing Shunyi District Yangzhen No. 1 Middle School (zh)

International schools located in Shunyi District include:

- International School of Beijing Shunyi Campus
- The British School of Beijing, Shunyi
- Dulwich College Beijing
- International Montessori School of Beijing River Garden Campus and Champagne Cove Campus
- Beijing New Talent Academy
- Beijing International Bilingual Academy
- Springboard International Bilingual School

Closed:

- Swedish School Beijing - Gahood Villa (嘉浩别墅)
- Beijing REGO British School

== Notable areas ==
- Pinnacle Plaza
- China International Exhibition Center
- Shunyi Olympic Rowing-Canoeing Park

== Climate ==
Shunyi District has a humid continental climate (Köppen climate classification Dwa). The average annual temperature in Shunyi is 12.7 °C (54.9 °F). The average annual rainfall is 577.5 mm (22.74 in) with July as the wettest month. The temperatures are highest on average in July, at around 26.8 °C (80.2 °F), and lowest in January, at around −3.5 °C (25.7 °F).

Climate data for Shunyi District, elevation 29 m (95 ft), (1991–2020 normals, extremes 1981–present)
Month	Jan	Feb	Mar	Apr	May	Jun	Jul	Aug	Sep	Oct	Nov	Dec	Year
Record high °C (°F)	13.8 (56.8)	20.4 (68.7)	29.4 (84.9)	32.5 (90.5)	38.2 (100.8)	39.7 (103.5)	42.0 (107.6)	38.0 (100.4)	34.9 (94.8)	30.9 (87.6)	21.8 (71.2)	15.8 (60.4)	42.0 (107.6)
Mean daily maximum °C (°F)	2.1 (35.8)	5.9 (42.6)	13.0 (55.4)	21.0 (69.8)	27.3 (81.1)	30.8 (87.4)	31.7 (89.1)	30.7 (87.3)	26.4 (79.5)	19.2 (66.6)	10.1 (50.2)	3.4 (38.1)	18.5 (65.2)
Daily mean °C (°F)	−3.5 (25.7)	−0.1 (31.8)	6.9 (44.4)	14.8 (58.6)	21.0 (69.8)	25.0 (77.0)	26.8 (80.2)	25.7 (78.3)	20.5 (68.9)	13.1 (55.6)	4.5 (40.1)	−1.8 (28.8)	12.7 (54.9)
Mean daily minimum °C (°F)	−7.6 (18.3)	−4.8 (23.4)	1.3 (34.3)	8.7 (47.7)	14.7 (58.5)	19.7 (67.5)	22.7 (72.9)	21.6 (70.9)	16.0 (60.8)	8.2 (46.8)	0.1 (32.2)	−5.6 (21.9)	7.9 (46.3)
Record low °C (°F)	−20.6 (−5.1)	−16.9 (1.6)	−11.5 (11.3)	−1.9 (28.6)	4.1 (39.4)	9.8 (49.6)	15.7 (60.3)	13.9 (57.0)	5.3 (41.5)	−4.1 (24.6)	−11.1 (12.0)	−15.5 (4.1)	−20.6 (−5.1)
Average precipitation mm (inches)	2.4 (0.09)	4.9 (0.19)	8.8 (0.35)	19.8 (0.78)	34.8 (1.37)	73.5 (2.89)	192.1 (7.56)	137.1 (5.40)	60.3 (2.37)	27.5 (1.08)	14.1 (0.56)	2.2 (0.09)	577.5 (22.73)
Average precipitation days (≥ 0.1 mm)	1.4	2.1	3.0	4.7	6.2	10.0	12.7	10.8	7.8	5.0	2.8	1.6	68.1
Average snowy days	2.6	2.3	1.4	0.1	0	0	0	0	0	0	1.7	2.5	10.6
Average relative humidity (%)	44	44	42	43	49	60	72	74	68	62	56	48	55
Mean monthly sunshine hours	186.3	181.7	223.7	239.0	262.9	222.7	184.3	203.9	208.6	197.3	168.9	176.4	2,455.7
Percentage possible sunshine	62	60	60	60	59	50	41	48	57	58	57	61	56
Source: China Meteorological Administration all-time extreme temperature all time August record high

== Gallery ==
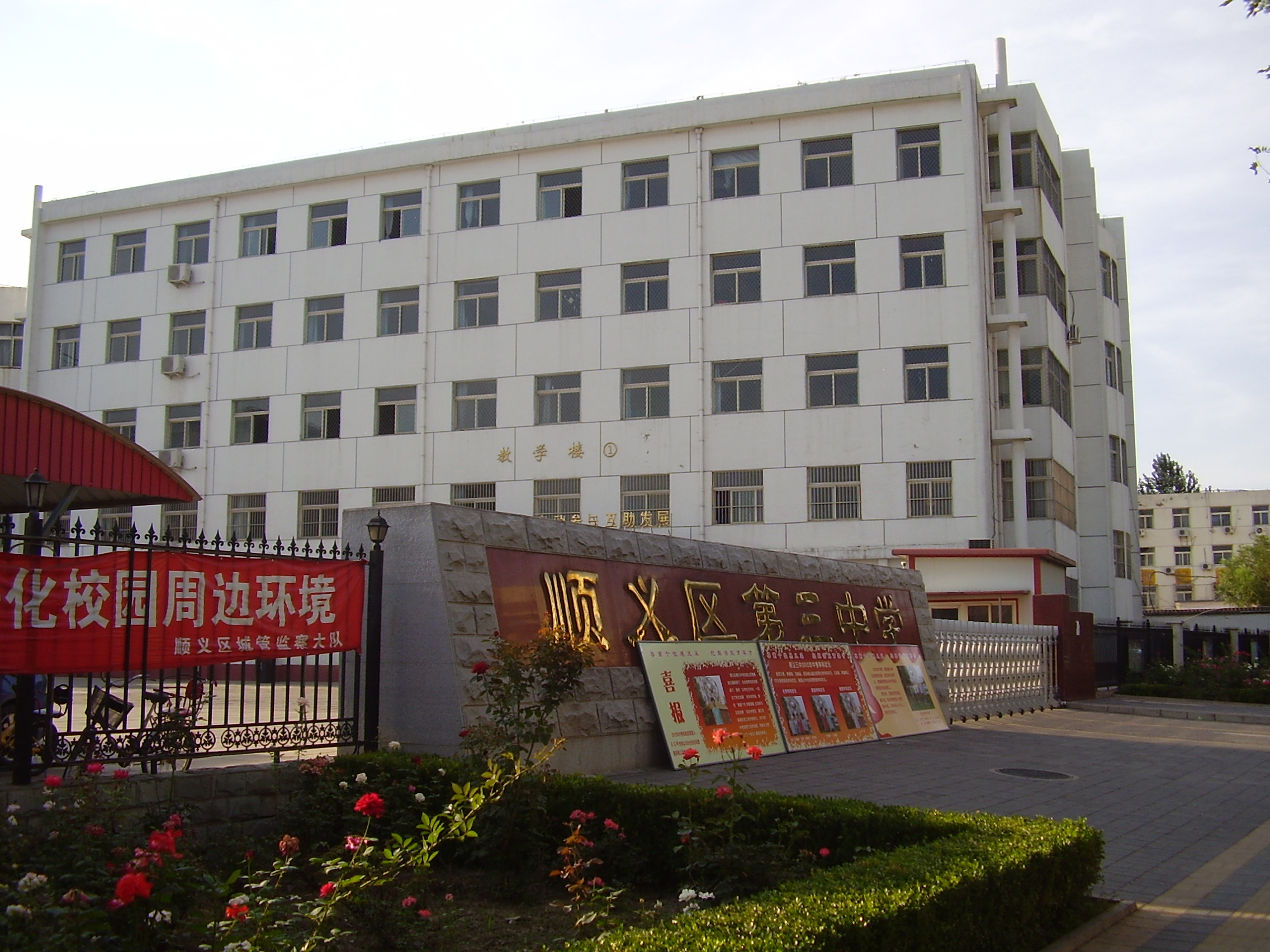
Shunyi District No. 3 Middle School

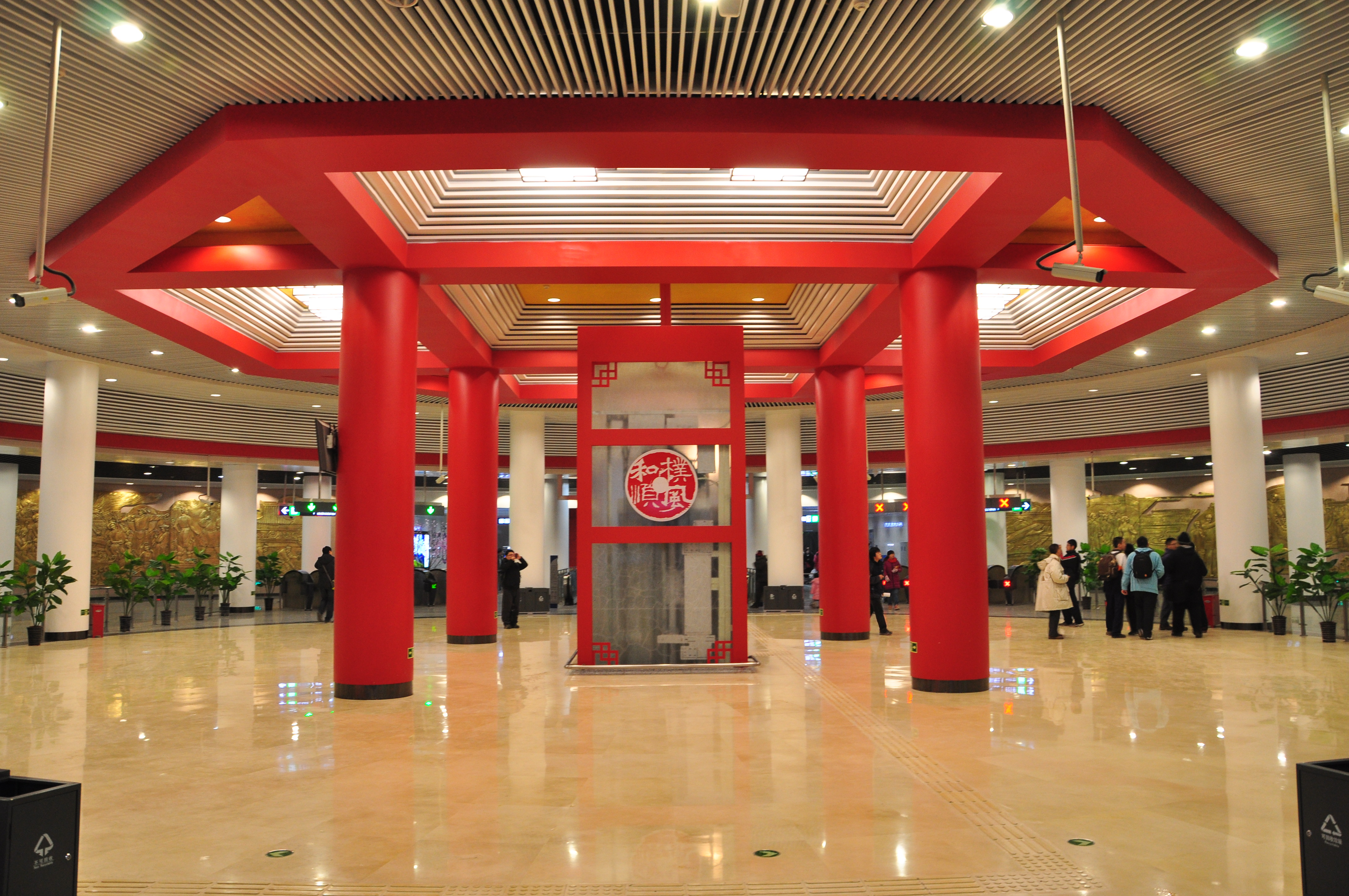
Shunyi Station

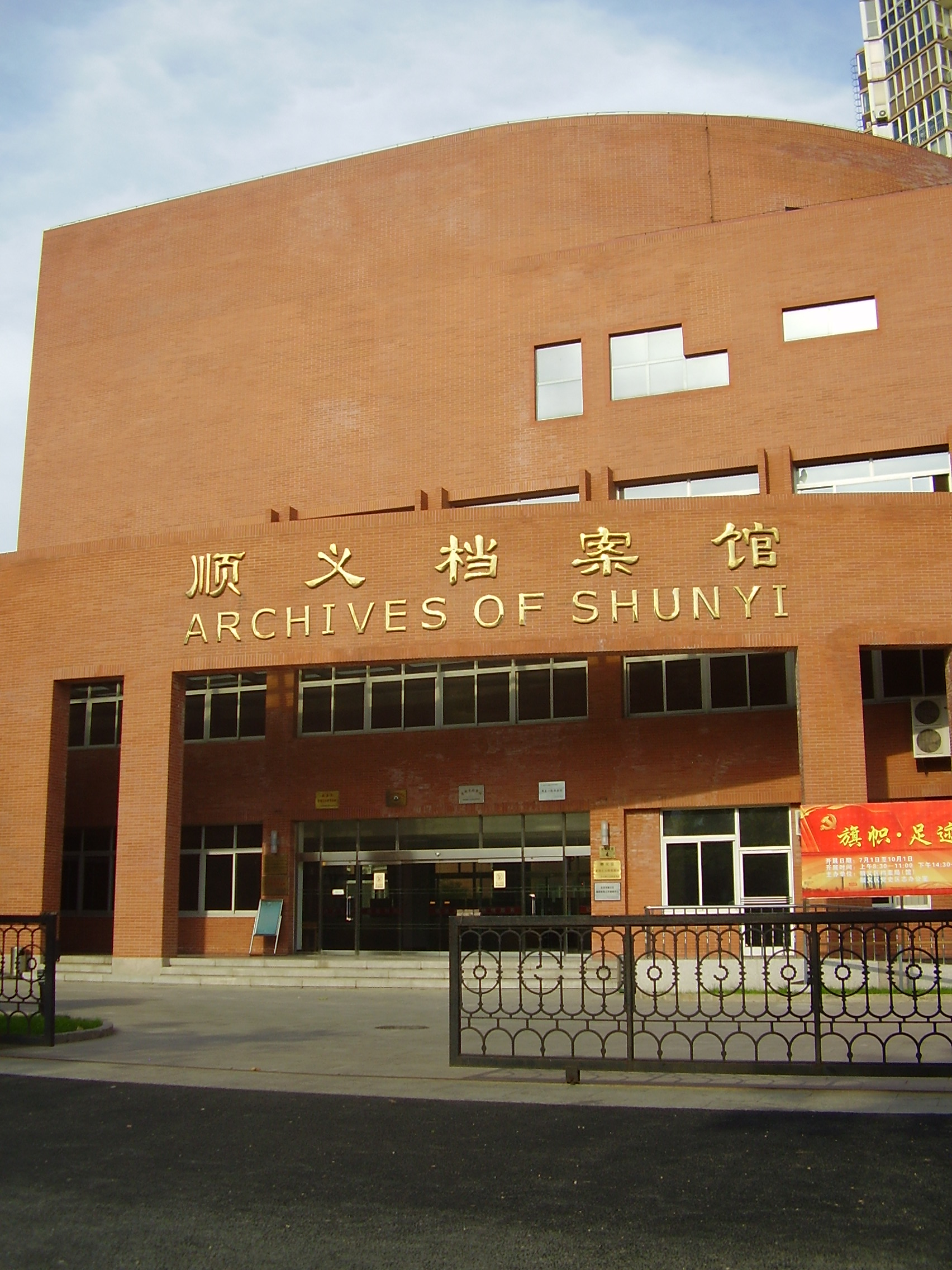
Archives of Shunyi

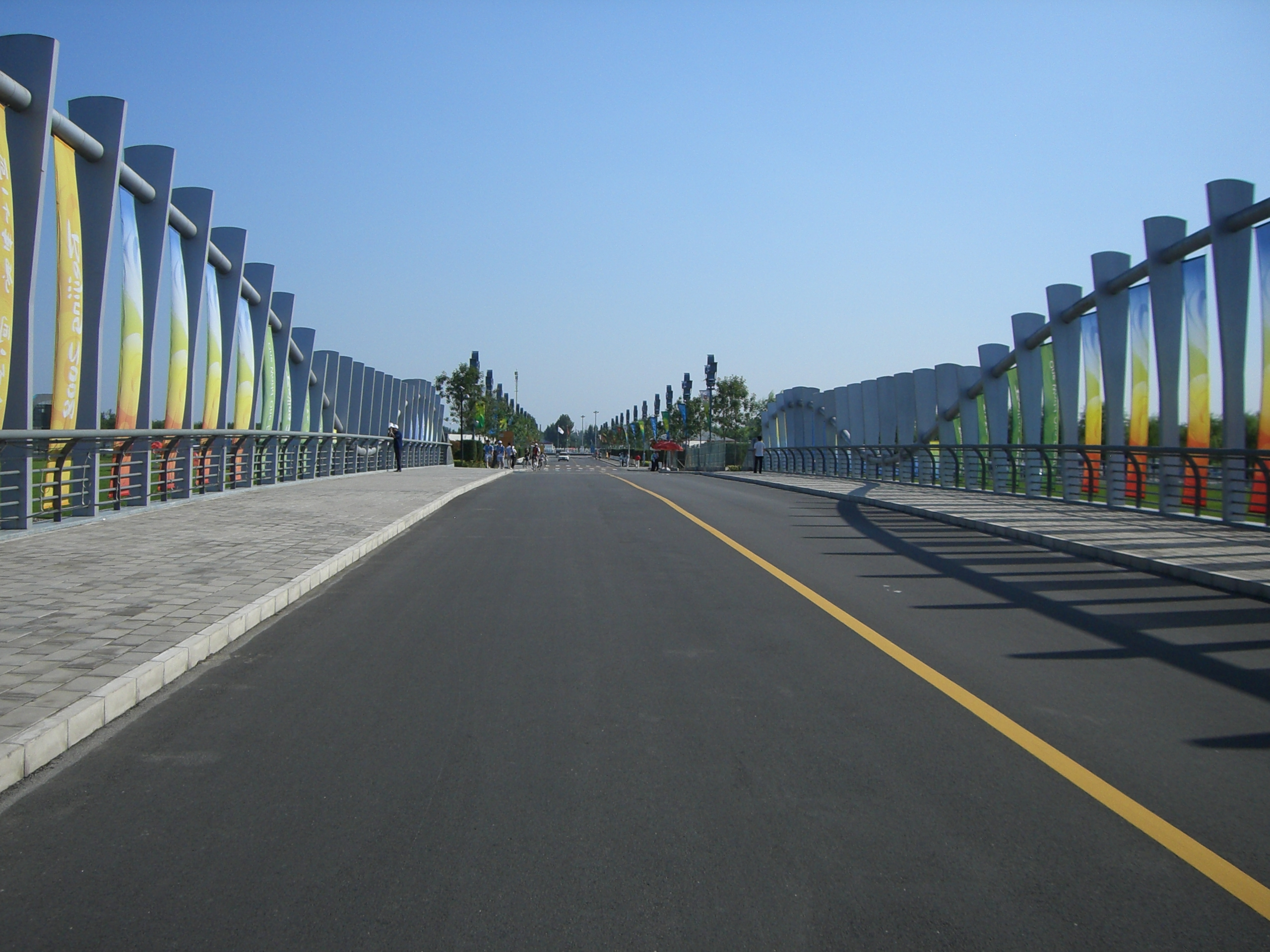
The bridge over the Shunyi Olympic Rowing-Canoeing Park

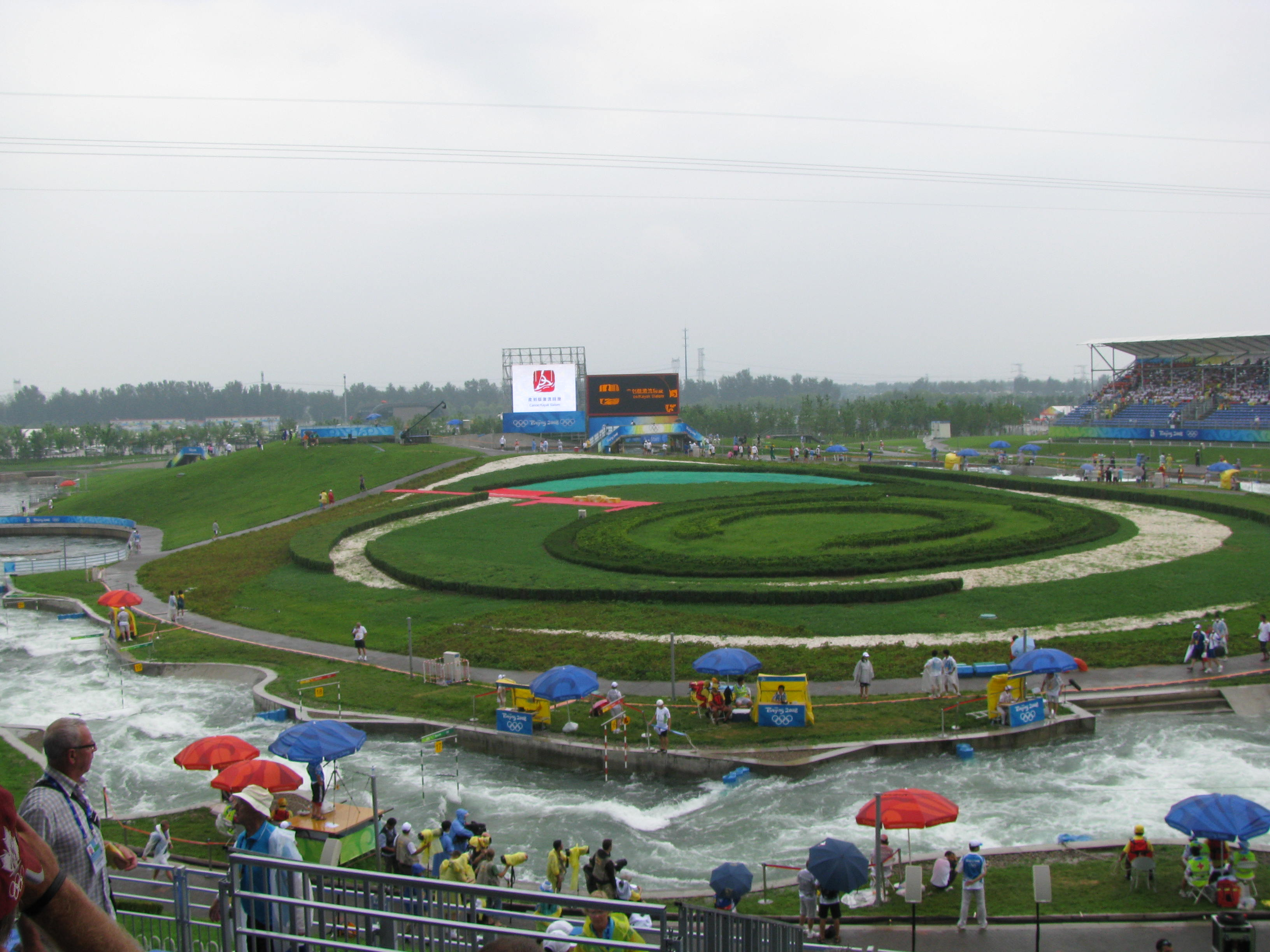
Shunyi Slalom Course

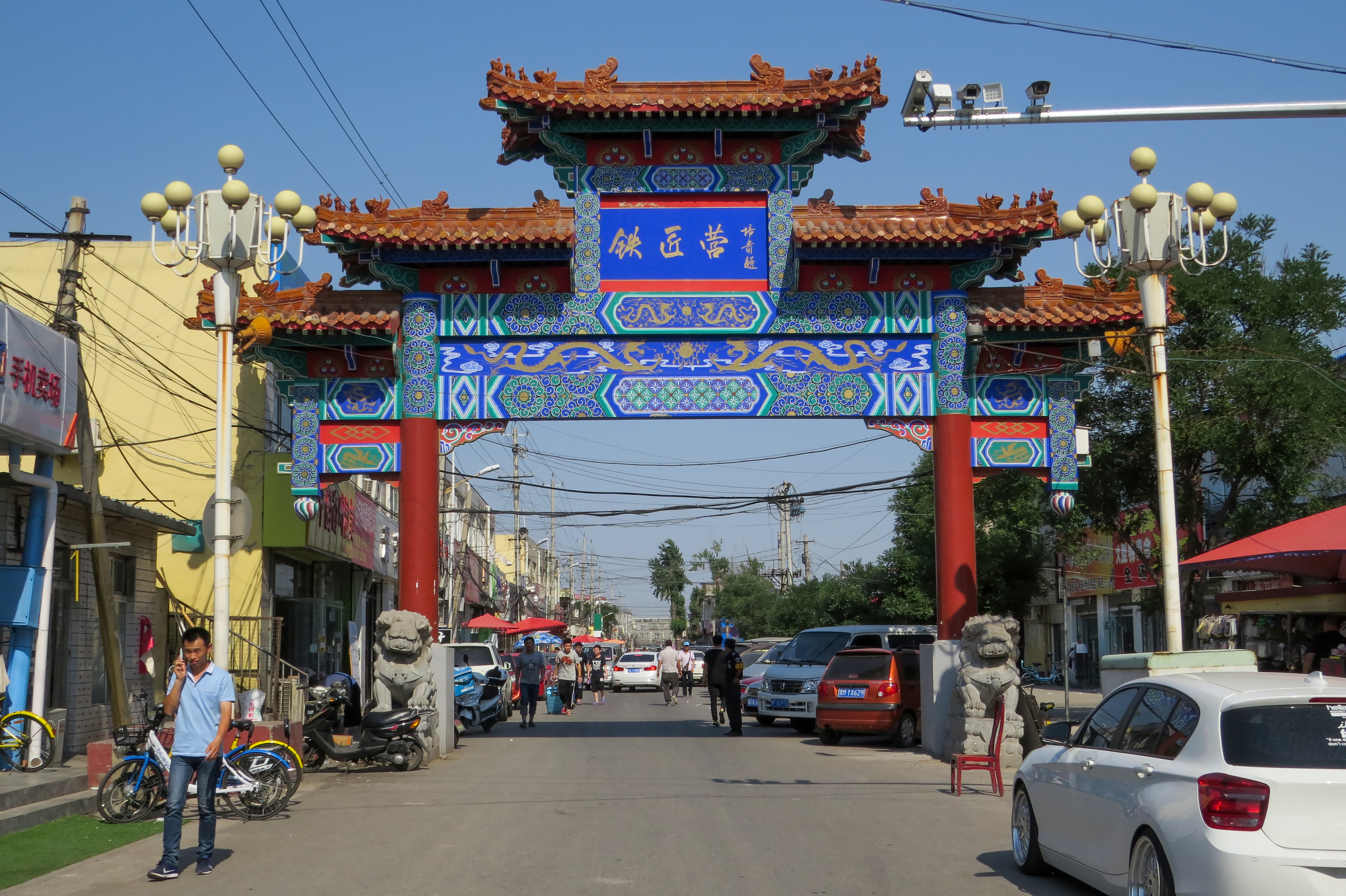
Tiejiangying Village gate
