= Liqiao, Beijing =

Liqiao Town 李桥镇
- Town
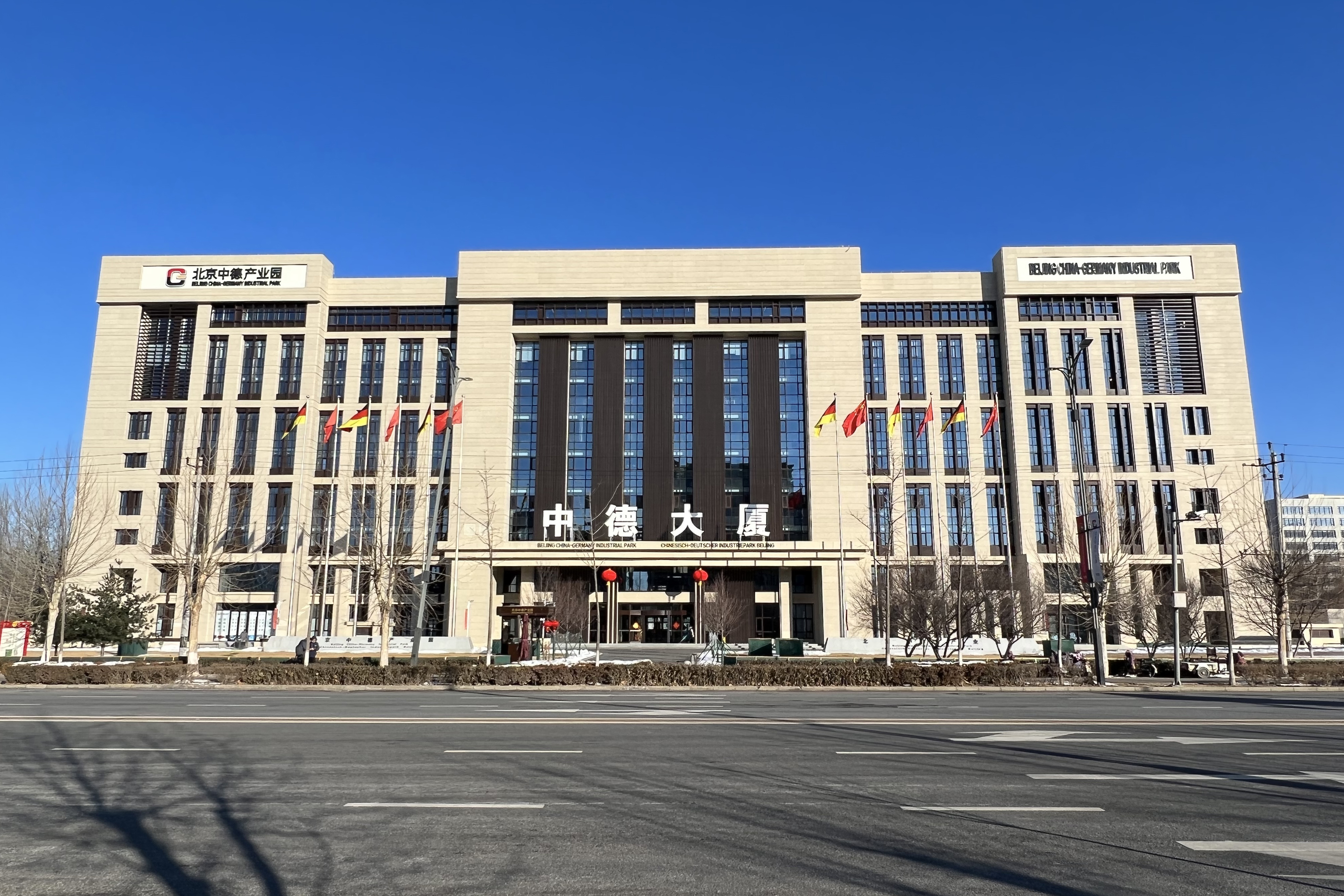
- Beijing Sino-German Industrial Park, 2022

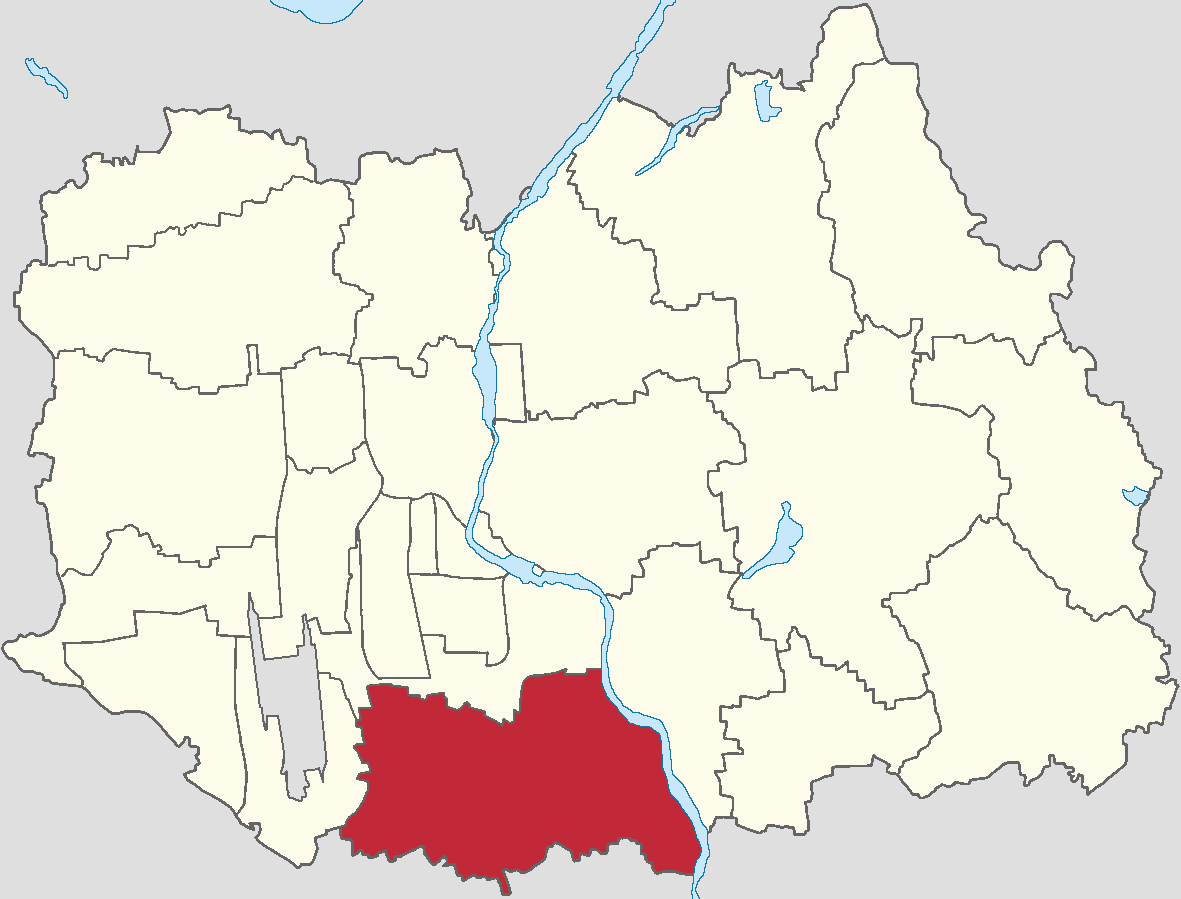
- Location of Liqiao Town within Shunyi District

- Location within Beijing Location within China
- Coordinates: 40°03′32″N 116°38′19″E
- Country: China
- Municipality: Beijing
- District: Shunyi
- Village-level Divisions: 4 communities 31 villages

Area
  - Total: 74.31 km^{2} (28.69 sq mi)
- Elevation: 30 m (98 ft)

Population (2020)
  - Total: 97,059
  - Density: 1,306/km^{2} (3,383/sq mi)
- Time zone: UTC+8 (China Standard)
- Postal code: 101304
- Area code: 010

Liqiao Town (simplified Chinese: 李桥镇; traditional Chinese: 李橋鎮; pinyin: Lǐqiáo Zhèn) is a town on the south side of Shunyi District, Beijing. It shares border with Renhe Town in the north, Lisui Town in the east, Songzhuang Town in the south, and Tianzhu Town in the west. The town had 97,059 people residing within it in 2020.

The name Liqiao used to be Lijiaqiao (Chinese: 李家桥; lit. 'Li Family's Bridge') due to its concentration of people with the last name Li.

== History ==
Timetable of Liqiao Town
Year	Status	Belonged to
1912–1949	4th District	Shunyi County
1949–1956	5th and 10th Districts	Shunyi County
1956–1958	Lijiaqiao Township	Shunyi County
1958–1961	Lijiaqiao People's Commune	Shunyi County
1961–1966	Lijiaqiao People's Commune Yanhe People's Commune	Shunyi County
1966–1975	Lijiaqiao People's Commune	Shunyi County
1975–1983	Lijiaqiao People's Commune Yanhe People's Commune	Shunyi County
1983–1989	Lijiaqiao Township Yanhe Township	Shunyi County
1989–1998	Liqiao Town Yanhe Township	Shunyi County
1998–present	Liqiao Town	Shunyi District

== Administrative divisions ==
In 2021, Liqiao Town was composed of 35 subdivisions, more specifically 4 communities and 31 villages:

Administrative division code	Subdivision names	Name transliteration	Town
110113104001	樱花园	Yinghuayuan	Community
110113104002	馨港庄园	Xingang Zhuangyuan	Community
110113104003	畅顺园	Changshunyuan	Community
110113104004	苏活	Suhuo	Community
110113104201	李家桥	Lijiaqiao	Village
110113104202	英各庄	Yinggezhuang	Village
110113104203	张辛	Zhangxin	Village
110113104204	临清	Linqing	Village
110113104205	南半壁店	Nan Banbidian	Village
110113104206	后桥	Houqiao	Village
110113104207	庄子营	Zhuangziying	Village
110113104208	洼子	Wazi	Village
110113104209	头二营	Tou'erying	Village
110113104210	三四营	Sansiying	Village
110113104211	西树行	Xi Shuxing	Village
110113104212	西大坨	Xi Datuo	Village
110113104213	北河	Beihe	Village
110113104214	沙浮	Shafu	Village
110113104215	王家场	Wangjiachang	Village
110113104216	沿河	Yanhe	Village
110113104217	芦各庄	Lugezhuang	Village
110113104218	史庄	Shizhuang	Village
110113104219	吴庄	Wuzhuang	Village
110113104220	永青庄	Yongqingzhuang	Village
110113104221	郭庄	Guozhuang	Village
110113104222	南河	Nanhe	Village
110113104223	北桃园	Bei Taoyuan	Village
110113104224	南桃园	Nan Taiyuan	Village
110113104225	安里	Anli	Village
110113104226	苏庄	Suzhuang	Village
110113104227	官庄	Guanzhuang	Village
110113104228	堡子	Baozi	Village
110113104229	沮沟	Qugou	Village
110113104230	北庄头	Bei Zhuangtou	Village
110113104231	南庄头	Nan Zhuangtou	Village

== Gallery ==
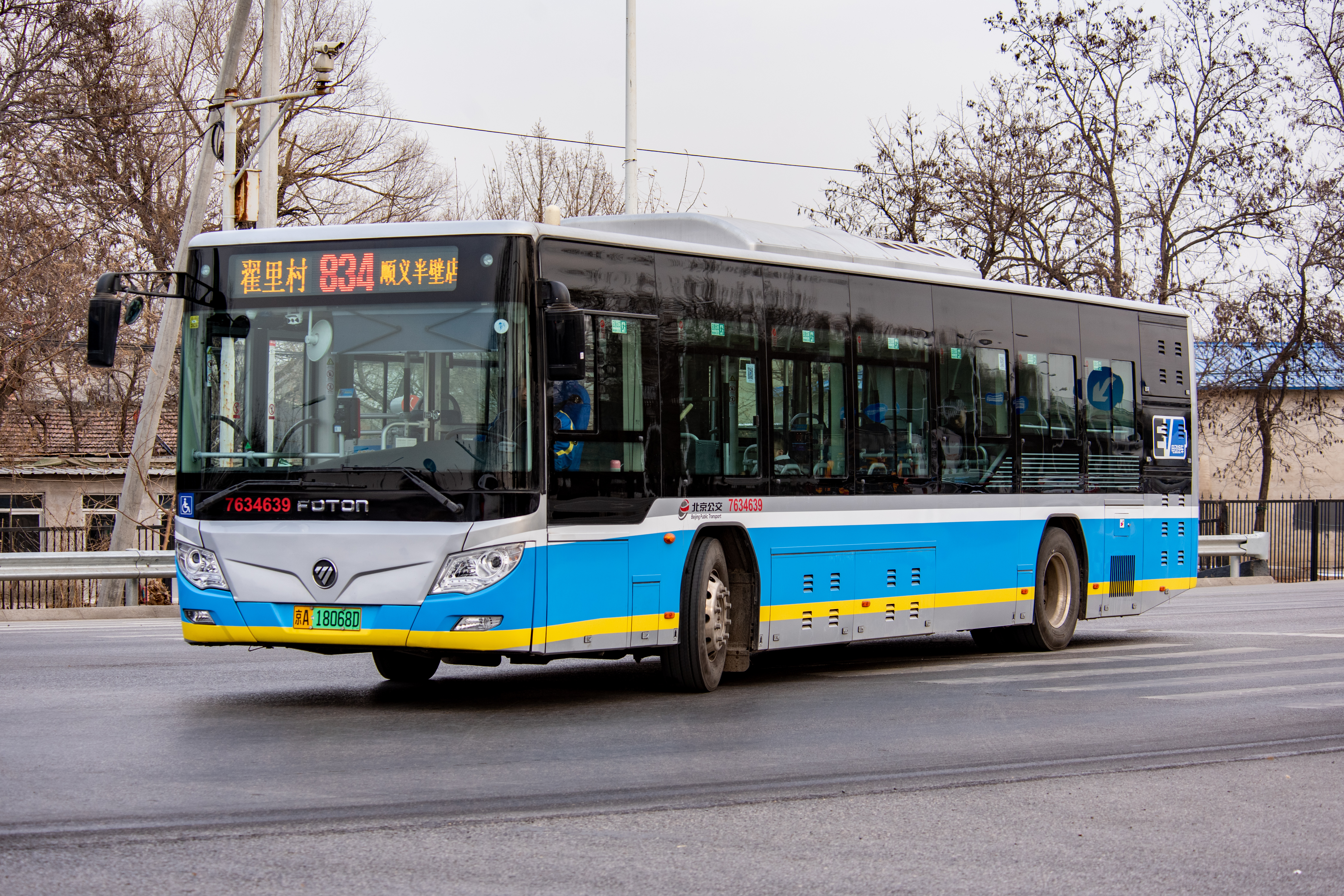
Bus on the Litian Road, 2020

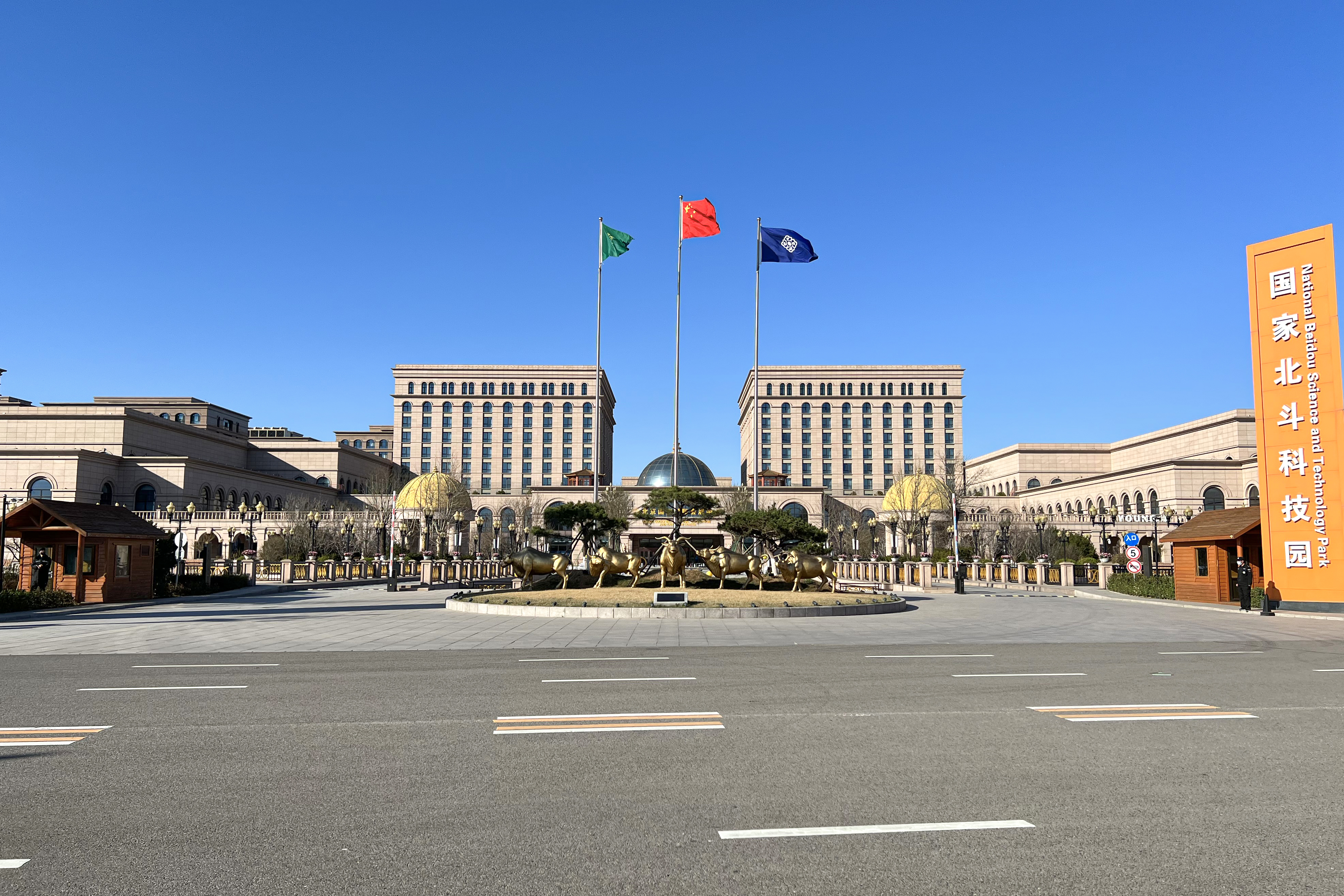
Beijing Guoce International Convention and Exhibition Center, 2022

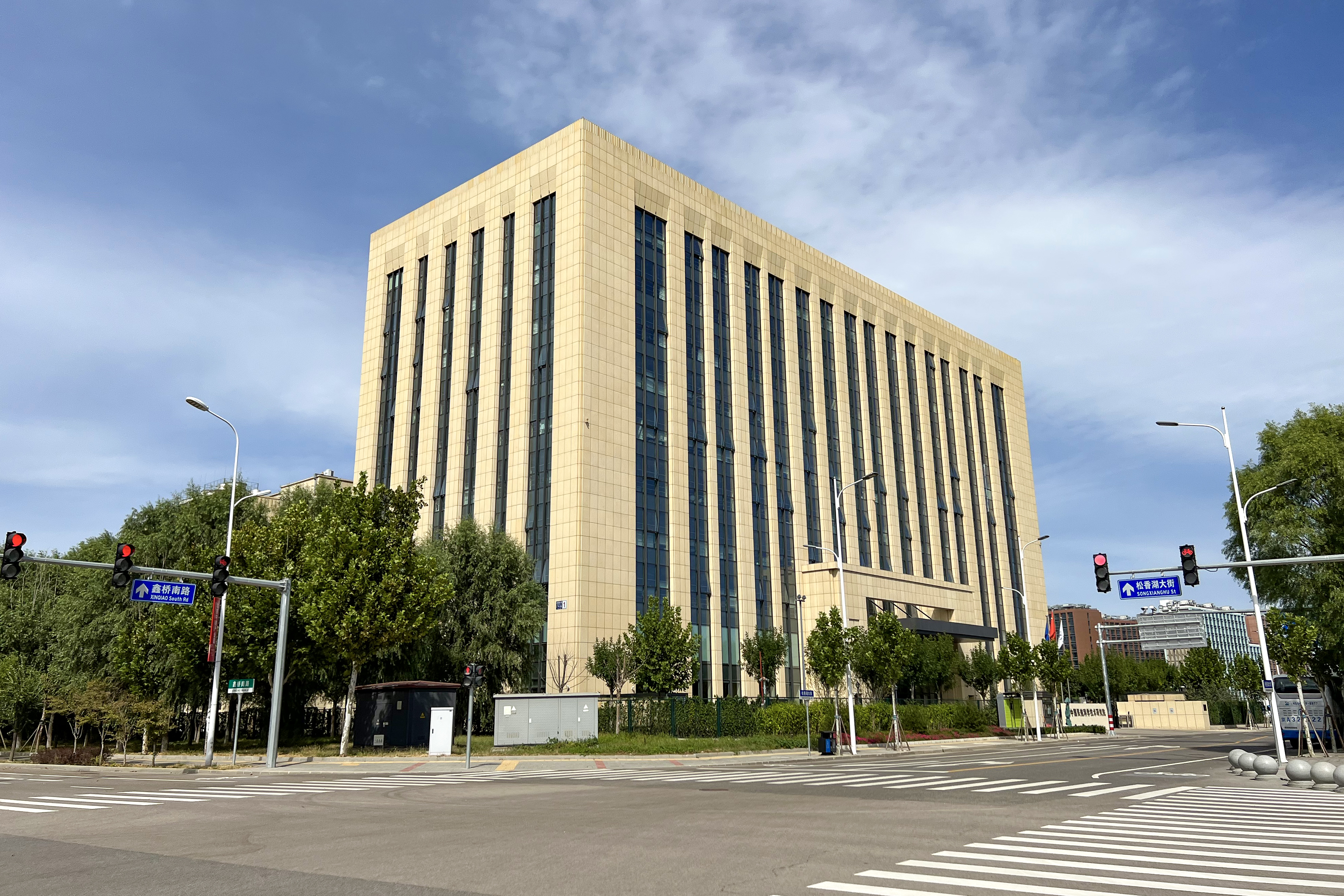
China Academy of Civil Aviation Science and Technology, 2022

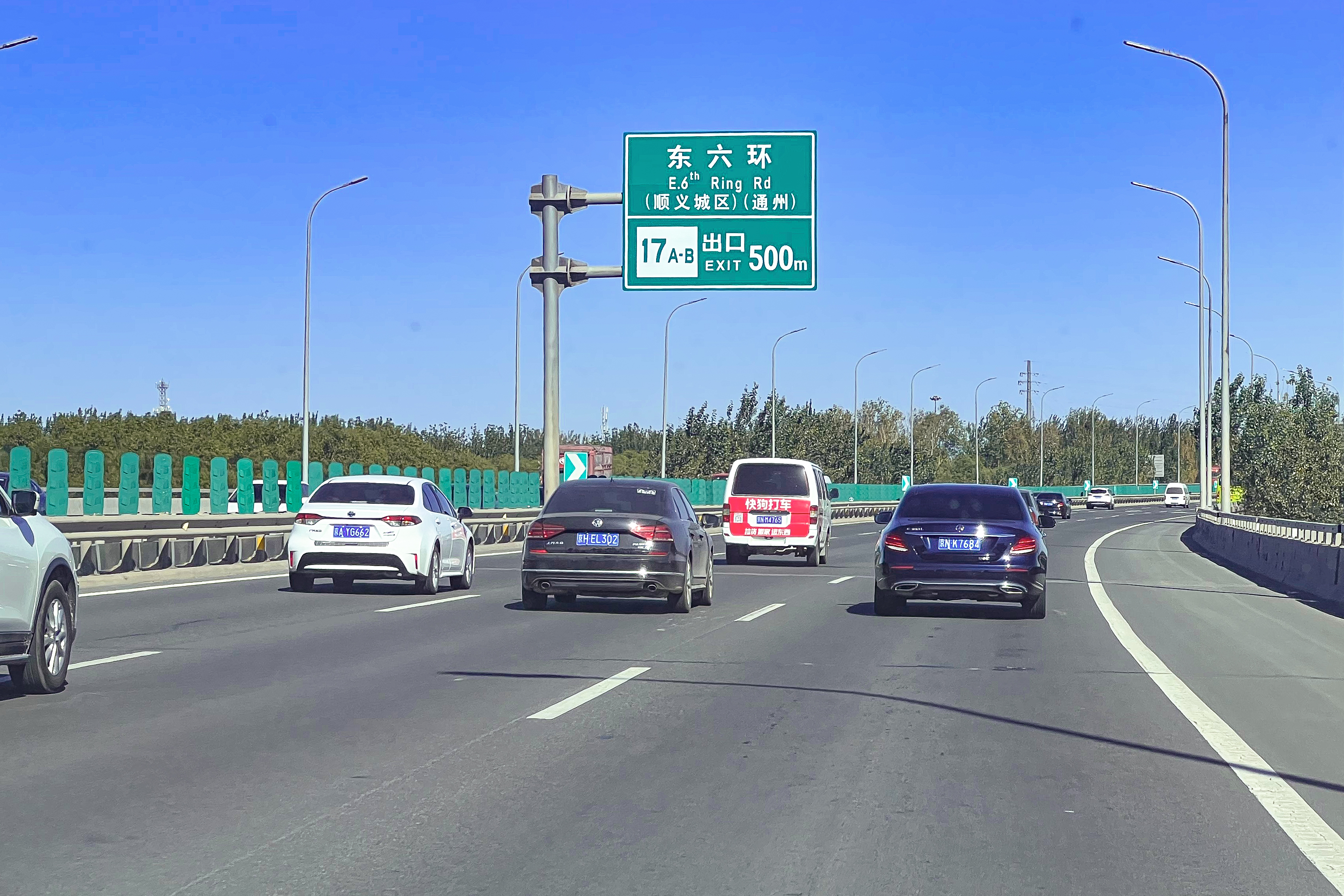
Jingping Expressway on the west of the town, 2022

== See also ==
- List of township-level divisions of Beijing
