= Nanfaxin, Beijing =

Nanfaxin Town 南法信镇
- Town
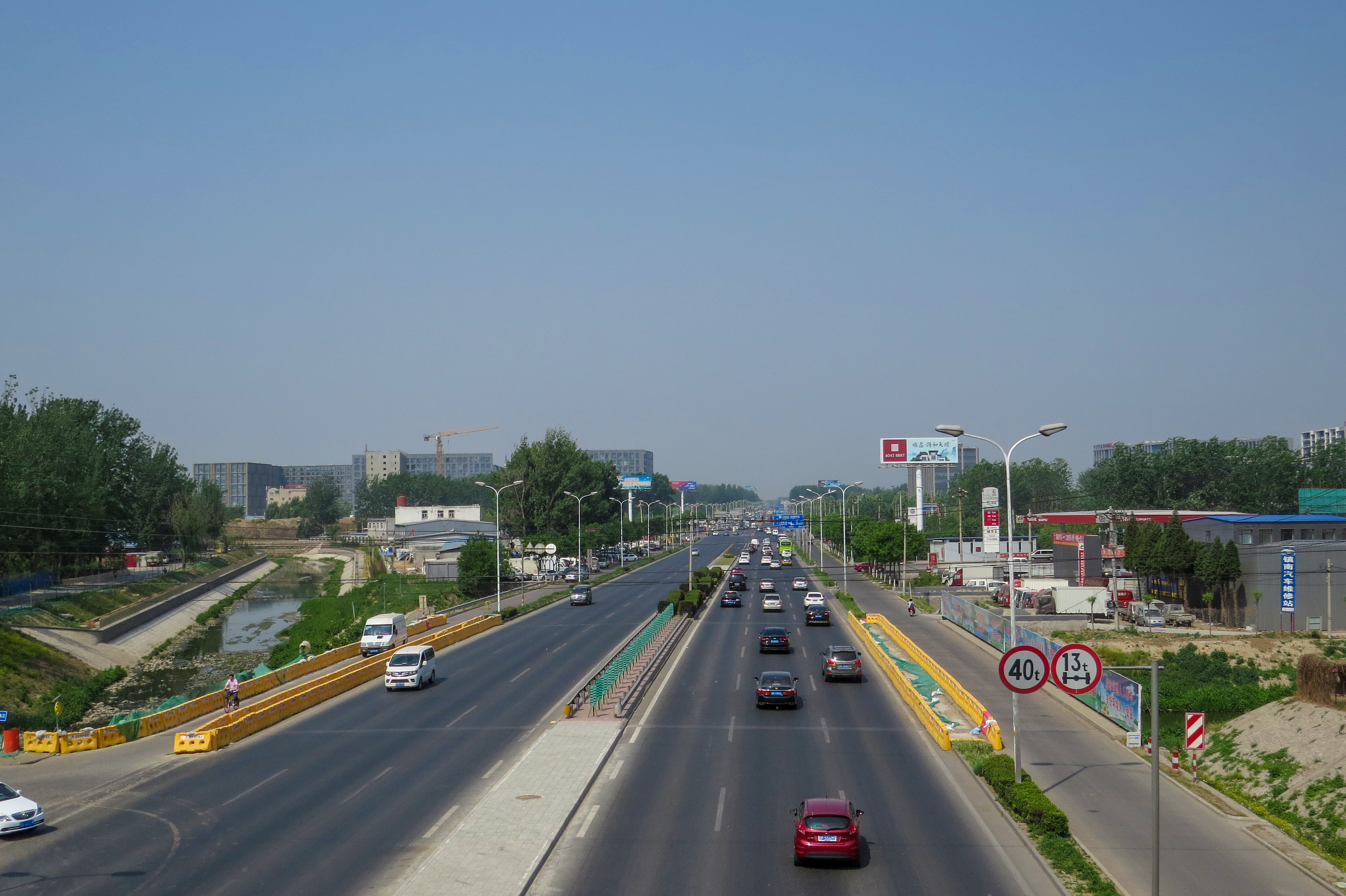
- Shunping Highway that passes through the town, 2017

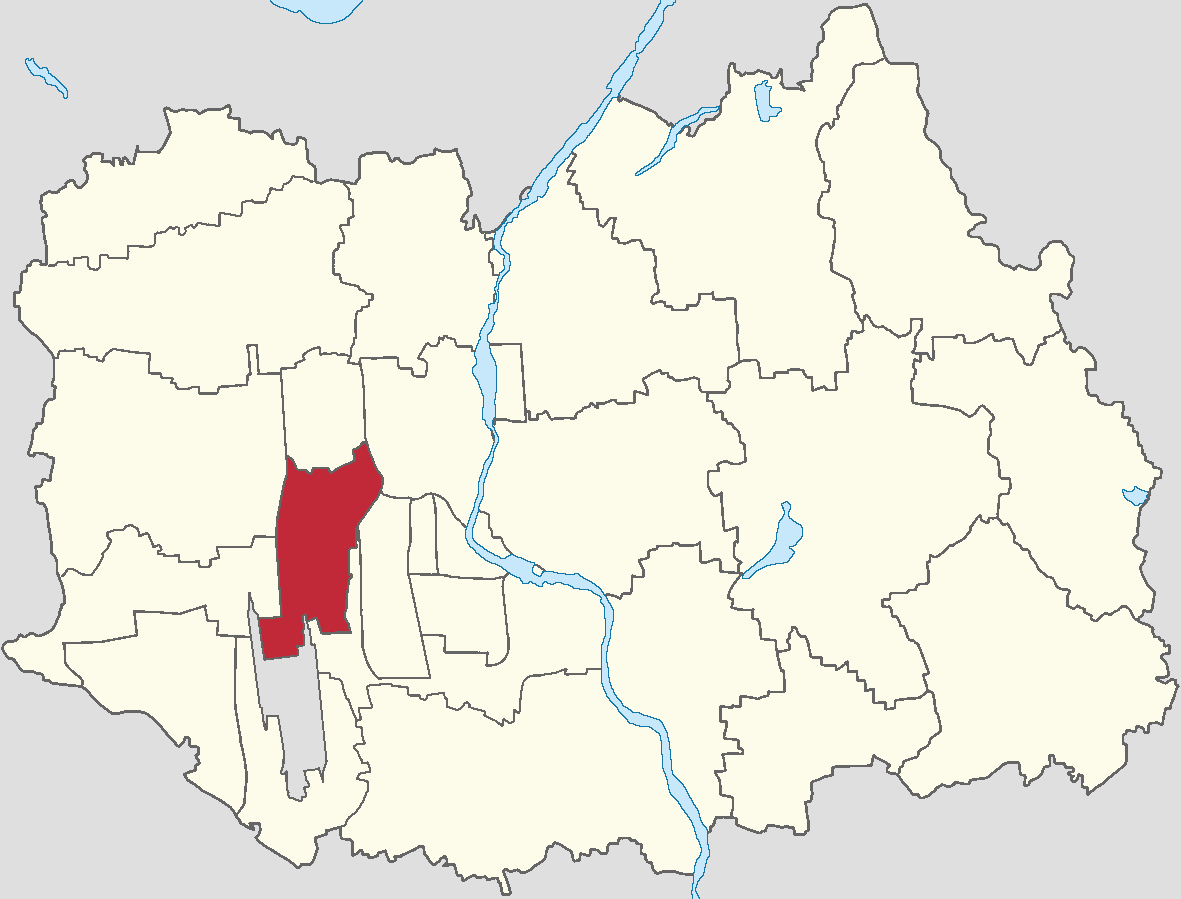
- Location of Nanfaxin Town within Shunyi District

- Location within Beijing Location within China
- Coordinates: 40°07′05″N 116°36′17″E
- Country: China
- Municipality: Beijing
- District: Shunyi
- Village-level Divisions: 1 communities 16 villages

Area
  - Total: 20.74 km^{2} (8.01 sq mi)
- Elevation: 34 m (112 ft)

Population (2020)
  - Total: 54,195
  - Density: 2,613/km^{2} (6,768/sq mi)
- Time zone: UTC+8 (China Standard)
- Postal code: 101300
- Area code: 010

Nanfaxin Town (Chinese: 南法信镇; pinyin: Nánfǎxìn Zhèn) is a town in western Shunyi District, Beijing, China. It borders Mapo Town and Shuangfeng Subdistrict to its north, Wangquan Subdistrict and Renhe Town to its east, Capital Airport Subdistrict to its south, Houshayu and Gaoliying Towns to its west. The 2020 Chinese census counted 54,195 residents for the area.

The settlement here used to be called Faxin Village, named after the two dominant families, Fa (法) and Xin (信), within the region. During the Ming dynasty, many villagers moved north and established another Faxin Village, so this region was renamed Nanfaxin (Chinese: 南法信; lit. 'South Faxin') to avoid confusion.

== History ==
Timeline of Nanfaxin Town
Year	Status	Under
1937–1946	6th District	Luanchanghuai and Huaishun United County
1946–1947	2nd District	Shunyi County
1947–1949	2nd District	Changshun United County
1949–1951	1st District	Shunyi County
1951–1961	Nanfaxin Township	Shunyi County
1961–1965	Nanfaxin People's Commune	Shunyi County
1965–1975	Part of Chengguan People's Commune	Shunyi County
1975–1983	Nanfaxin People's Commune	Shunyi County
1983–1998	Nanfaxin Township	Shunyi County
1998–2000	Nanfaxin Area	Shunyi District
2000–present	Nanfaxin Area (Nanfaxin Town)	Shunyi District

== Administrative divisions ==
In 2021, Nanfaxin Town was made up of 17 subdivisions, in which 1 was a community and 16 were villages:

Administrative division code	Subdivision names	Name transliteration	Type
110113008001	华英园	Huayingyuan	Community
110113008201	东海洪	Dong Haihong	Village
110113008202	西海洪	Xi Haihong	Village
110113008203	南卷	Nanjuan	Village
110113008204	三家店	Sanjiadian	Village
110113008205	东杜兰	Dong Dulan	Village
110113008206	西杜兰	Xi Dulan	Village
110113008207	北法信	Bei Faxin	Village
110113008208	焦各庄	Jiaogezhuang	Village
110113008209	大江洼	Dajiangwan	Village
110113008210	刘家河	Liujiahe	Village
110113008211	南法信	Nan Faxin	Village
110113008212	十里堡	Shilibao	Village
110113008213	马家营	Majiaying	Village
110113008214	哨马营	Shaomaying	Village
110113008215	冯家营	Fenjiaying	Village
110113008216	卸甲营	Xiejiaying	Village

== Gallery ==
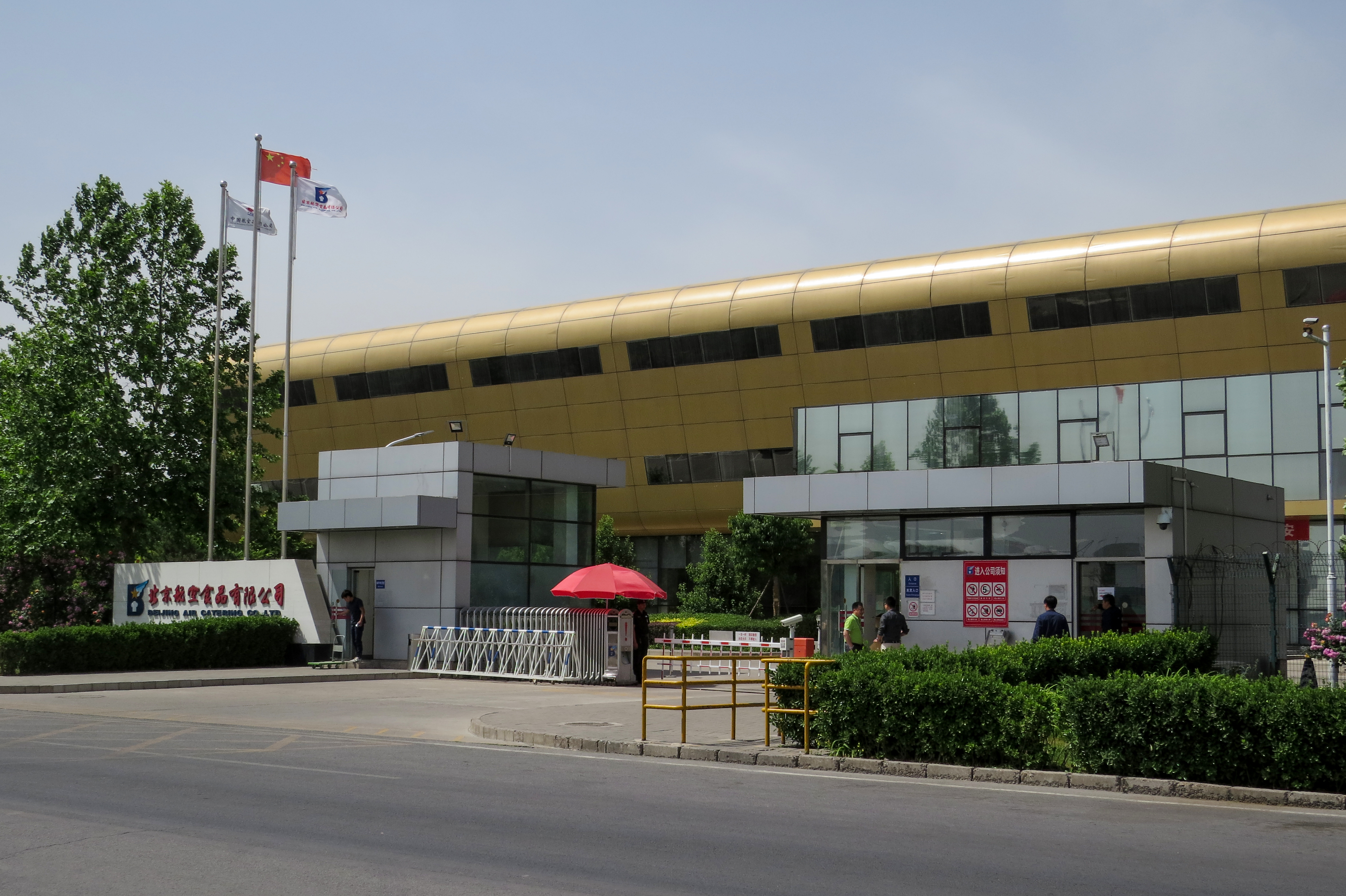
Beijing Air Catering headquarters, 2017

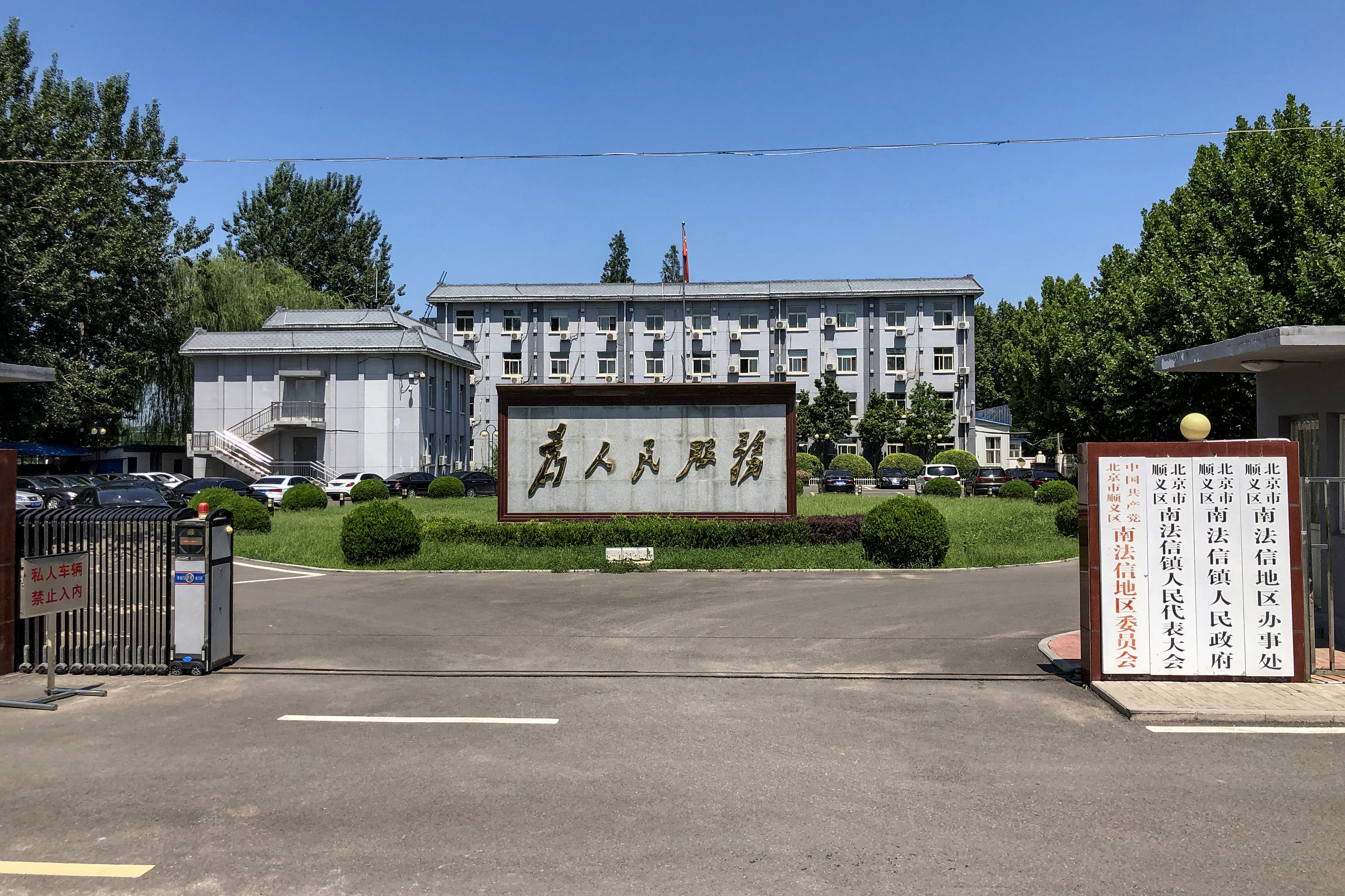
Building of Nanfaxin People's Government, 2019

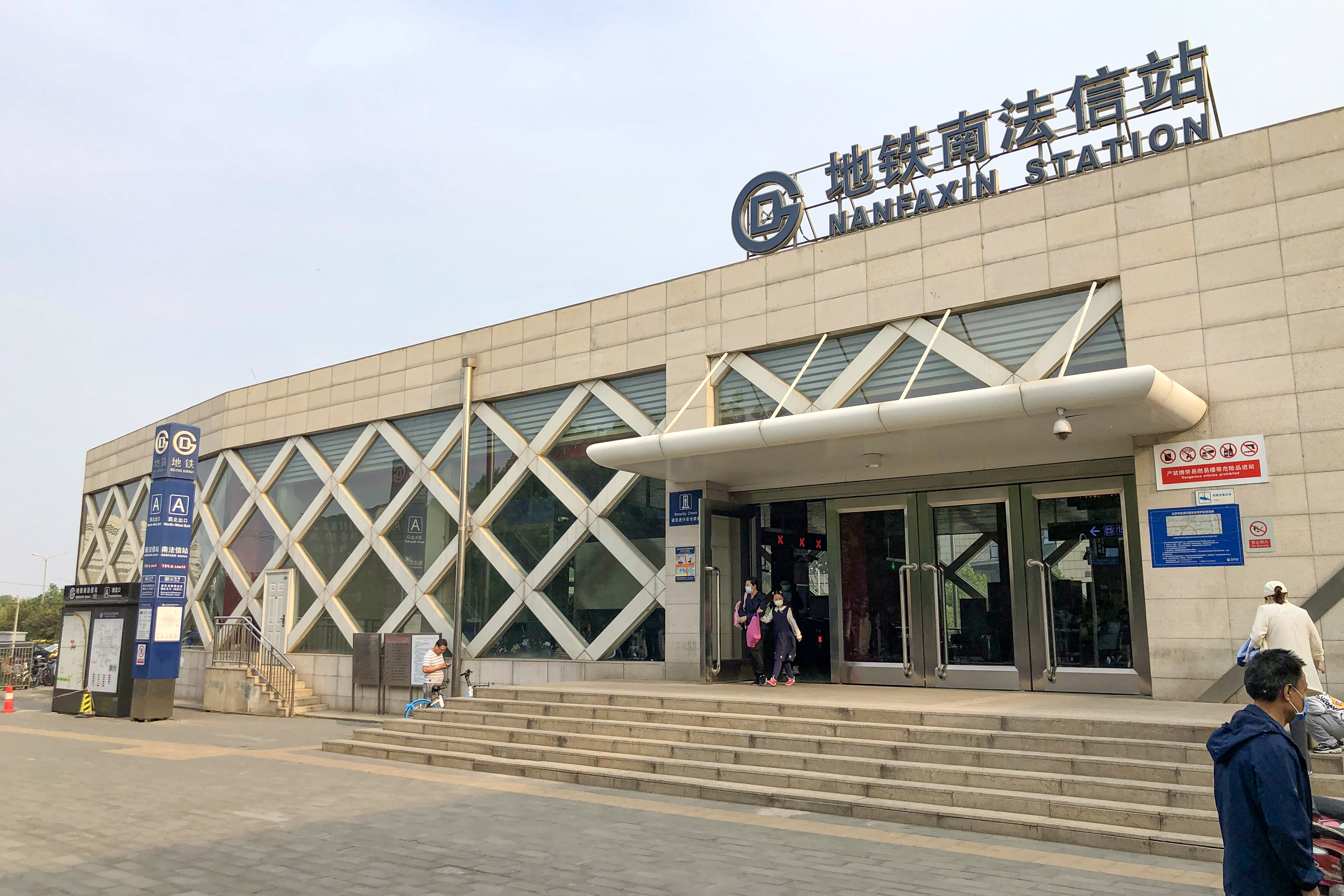
Nanfaxin Station of Beijing Subway, 2021

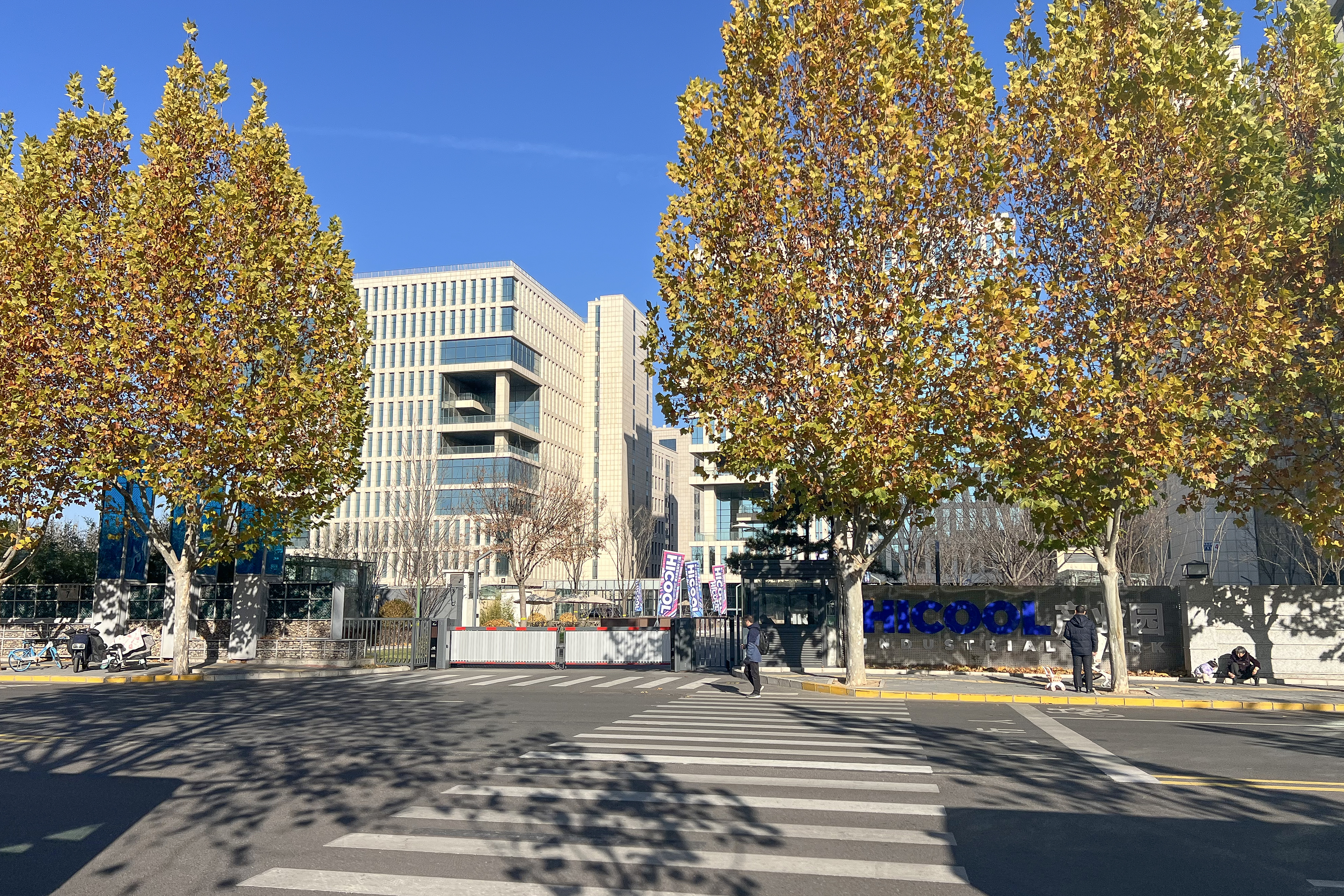
HICOOL Industrial Park, 2025

== See also ==
- List of township-level divisions of Beijing
