= Wangquan Subdistrict =

Wangquan Subdistrict 旺泉街道
- Subdistrict
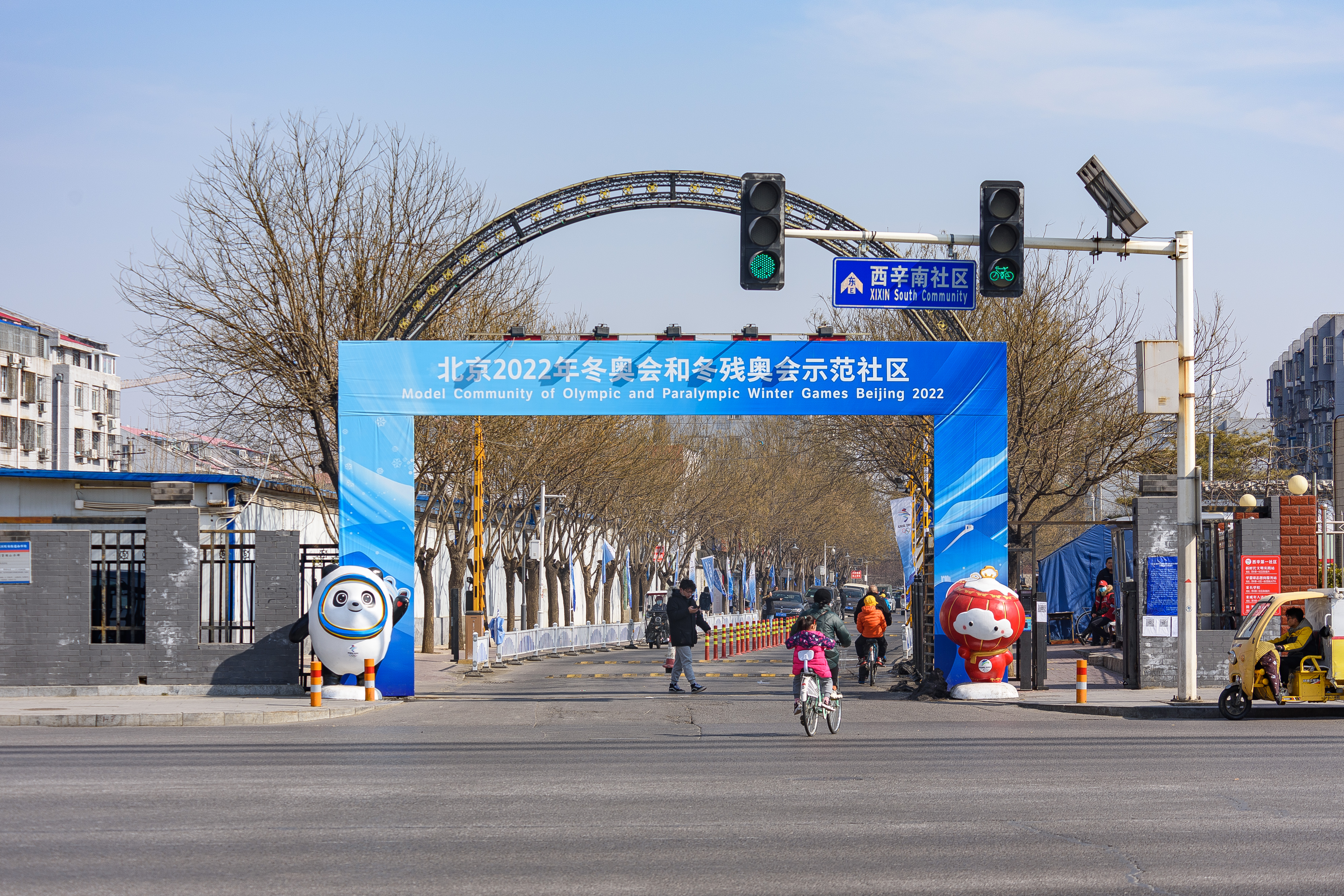
- Entrance of Xixin South Community, 2022

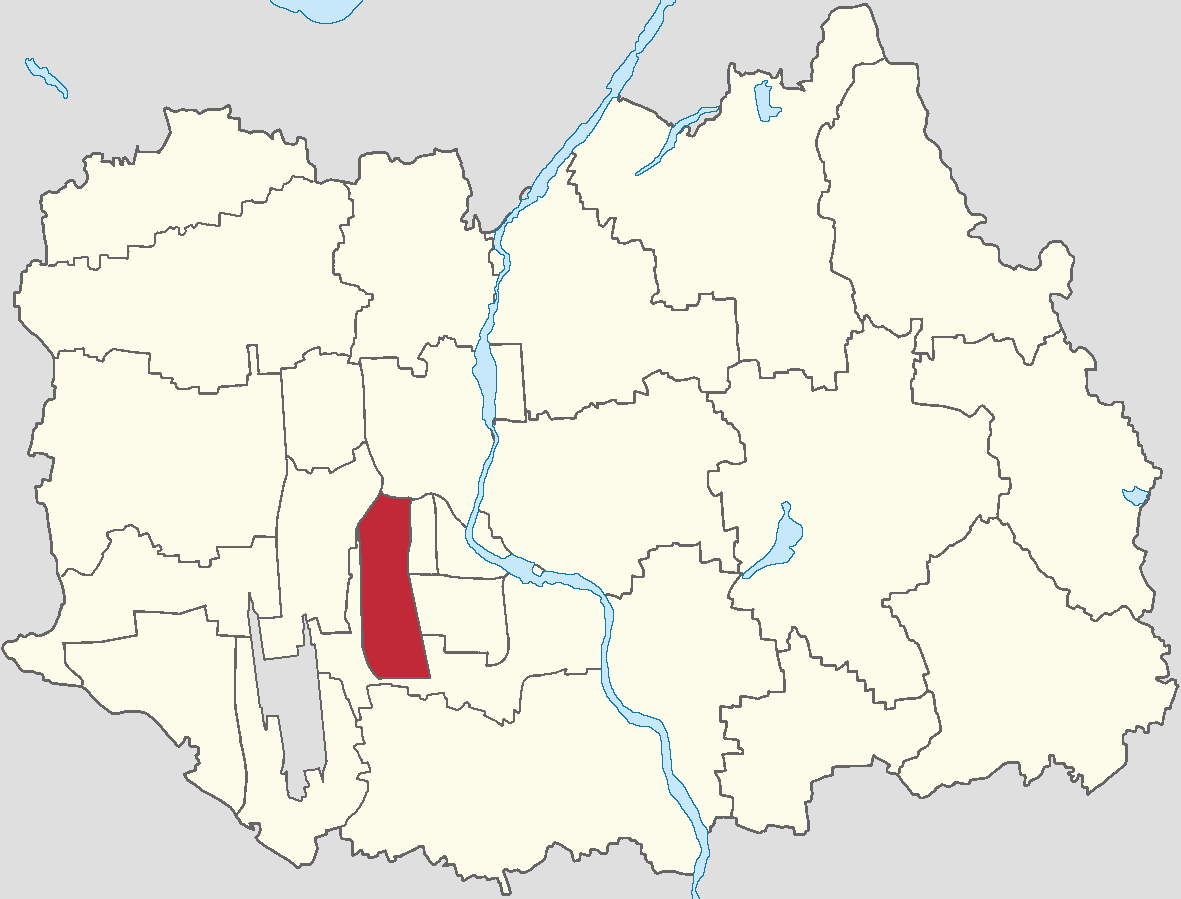
- Location of Wangquan Subdistrict within Shunyi District

- Location within Beijing Location within China
- Coordinates: 40°05′58″N 116°39′18″E
- Country: China
- Municipality: Beijing
- District: Shunyi
- Village-level Divisions: 20 communities 8 villages

Area
  - Total: 13.55 km^{2} (5.23 sq mi)
- Elevation: 36 m (118 ft)

Population (2020)
  - Total: 94,415
  - Density: 6,968/km^{2} (18,050/sq mi)
- Time zone: UTC+8 (China Standard)
- Postal code: 101300
- Area code: 010

Wangquan Subdistrict (Chinese: 旺泉街道; pinyin: Wàngquán Jiēdào) is a subdistrict in the west side of Shunyi District, Beijing, China. It shares border with Shuangfeng Subdistrict to the north, Shengli and Shiyuan Subdistricts to the east, Renhe Town to the south and west, and Nanfaxin Town to the northwest. Its population was 94,415 as of 2020.

The subdistrict was founded in 2007 by merging parts of Shengli Subdistrict, Guangming Subdistrict and Renhe Town.

== Administrative divisions ==
At the end of 2021, Wangquan Subdistrict had 28 subdivisions, where 20 of them were communities, and 8 of them were villages:

Administrative division code	Subdivision names	Name transliteration	Type
110113013001	铁十六局	Tieshiliuju	Community
110113013002	西辛第一	Xixin Diyi	Community
110113013003	西辛	Xixin	Community
110113013004	西辛北区	Xixin Beiqu	Community
110113013005	宏城花园	Hongcheng Huayuan	Community
110113013006	前进花园	Qianjin Huayuan	Community
110113013007	牡丹苑	Mudanyuan	Community
110113013008	望泉家园	Wangquan Jiayuan	Community
110113013009	梅兰家园	Meilan Jiayuan	Community
110113013010	澜西园二区	Lanxiyuan Erqu	Community
110113013011	澜西园三区	Lanxiyuan Sanqu	Community
110113013012	澜西园四区	Lanxiyuan Siqu	Community
110113013013	悦君家园	Yuejun Jiayuan	Community
110113013014	玉兰苑	Yulanyuan	Community
110113013015	梅香	Meixiang	Community
110113013016	望泉西里北	Wangquan Xili Bei	Community
110113013017	望泉西里南一	Wangquan Xili Nanyi	Community
110113013018	望泉西里南二	Wangquan Xili Nan'er	Community
110113013019	望泉西里南三	Wangquan Xili Nansan	Community
110113013020	望泉西里南四	Wangquan Xili Nansi	Community
110113013201	石门	Shimen	Village
110113013202	沙井	Shajing	Village
110113013203	望泉寺	Wangquansi	Village
110113013204	梅沟营	Meigouying	Village
110113013205	军营	Junying	Village
110113013206	吴家营	Wujiaying	Village
110113013207	杨家营	Yangjiaying	Village
110113013208	杜各庄	Dugezhuang	Village

== Gallery ==
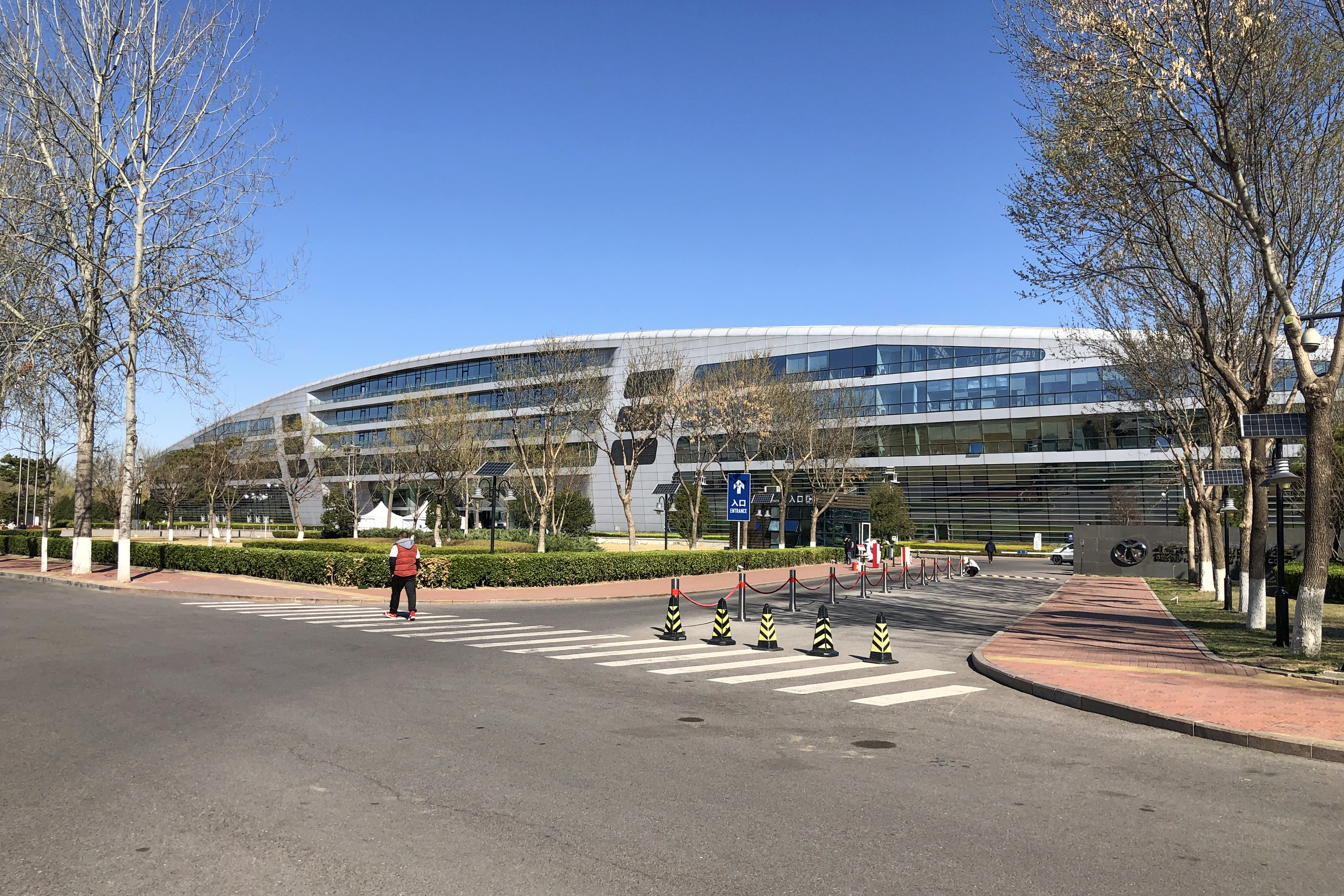
Headquarters of BAIC Group within the subdistrict, 2020

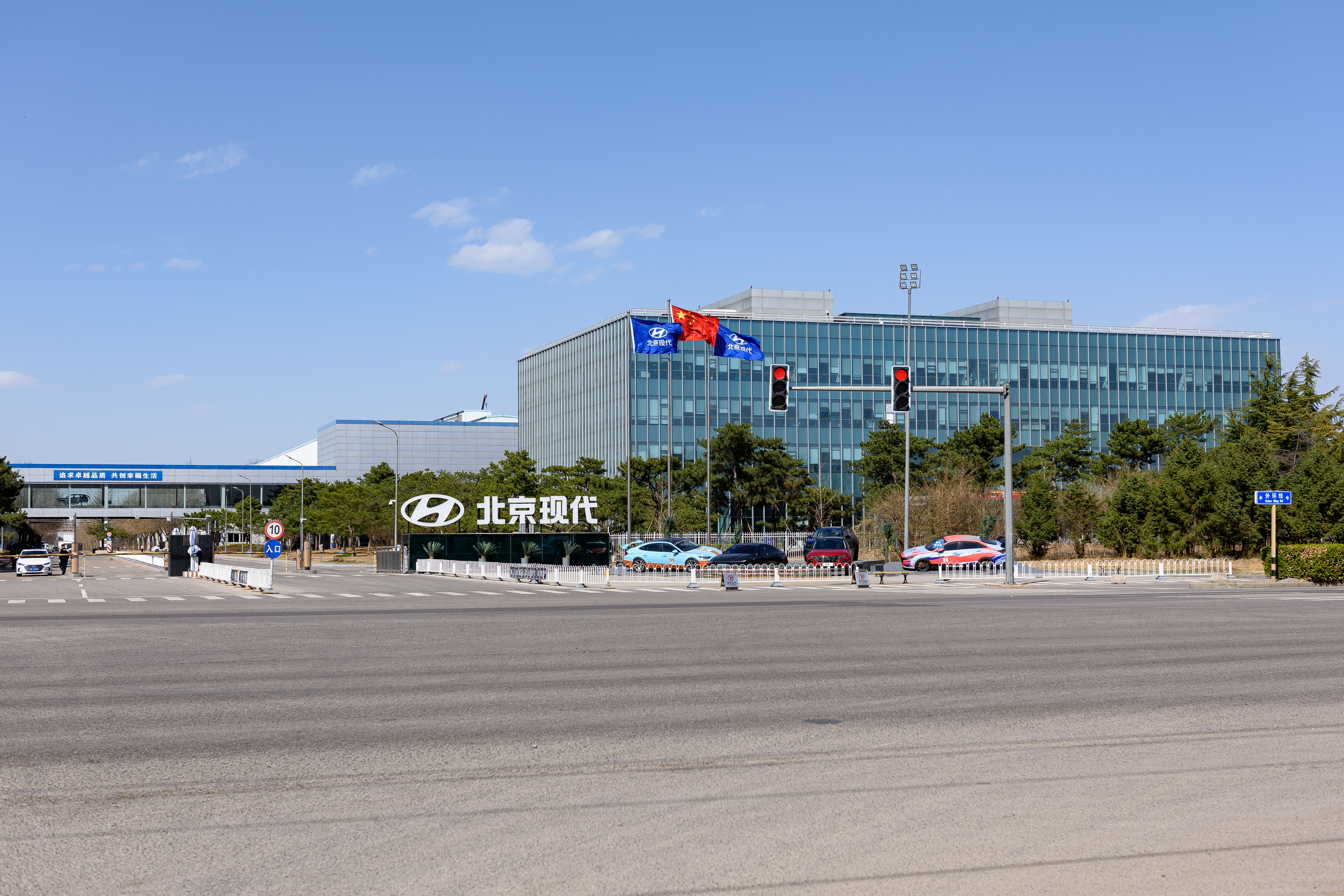
Headquarters of Beijing Hyundai within the subdistrict, 2024

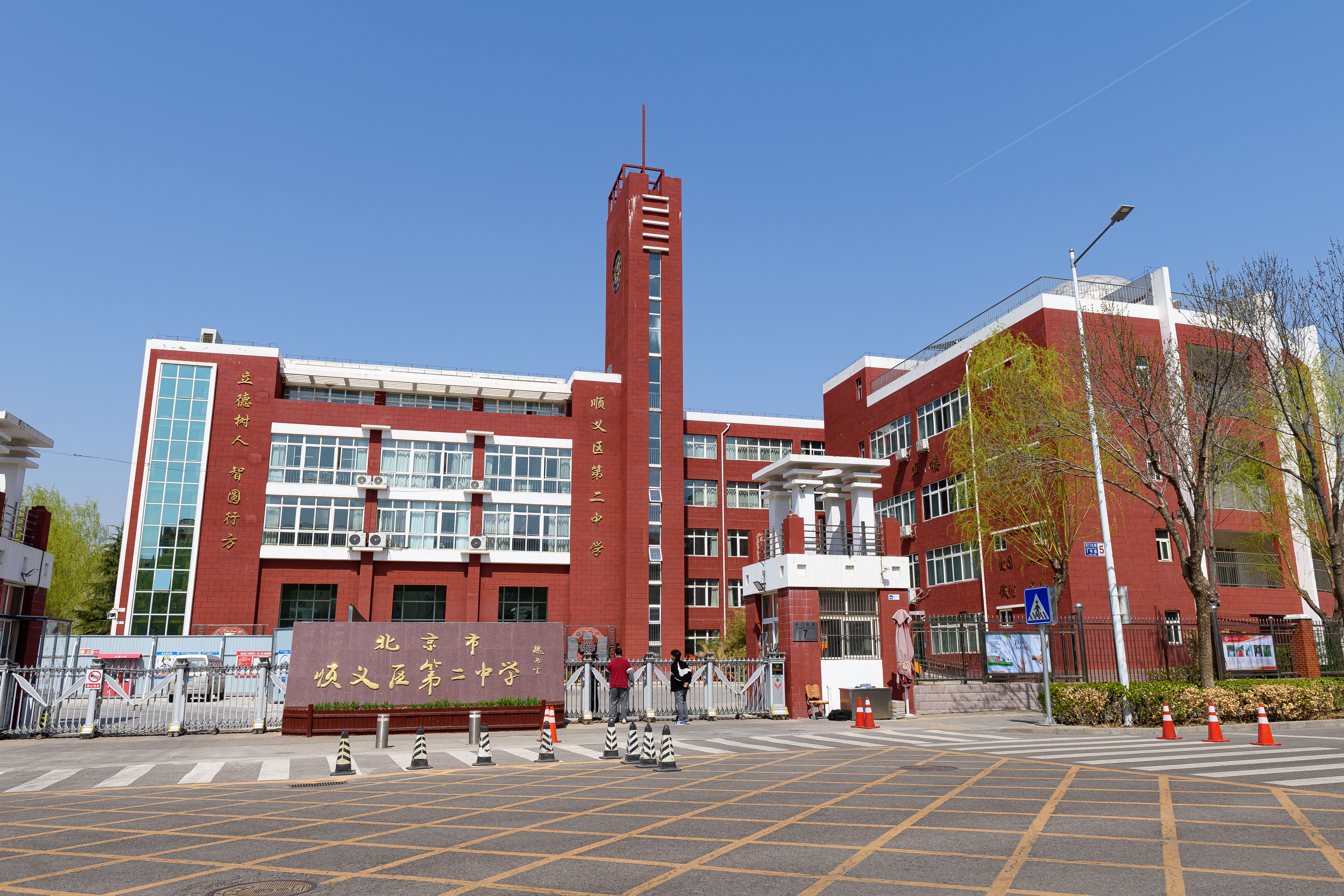
Shunyi No. 2 High School within the subdistrict, 2024

== See also ==
- List of township-level divisions of Beijing
