= Shiyuan =

Shiyuan may refer to:

- Shiyuan (始元, 86BC–80BC), an era name used by Emperor Zhao of Han

== Places in China ==
- Shiyuan Township, Henan (柿元乡), a township in Qi County, Kaifeng, Henan
- Shiyuan Township, Gansu (石塬乡), a township in Jishishan Bonan, Dongxiang and Salar Autonomous County, Gansu
- Shiyuan Township, Jiangxi (石芫乡), a township in Ganzhou, Jiangxi
- Shiyuan Township, Sichuan (石元乡), a township in Jiangyou, Sichuan
- Shiyuan Subdistrict, Beijing (石园街道), a subdistrict of Shunyi District, Beijing
- Shiyuan Han Tombs (柿园汉墓), tombs from the Han dynasty in Yongcheng, Henan

== People ==
- Pang Tong (179–214), courtesy name Shiyuan, advisor to Liu Bei during the Eastern Han
- Cui Shiyuan (c. 1806−1869), Qing poet and painter
- Chen Shih-yuan (born 1985), Taiwanese Go player
- Yang Shiyuan (born 1994), Chinese Super League footballer
