= Dusheng =

Dusheng 杜生镇
- Town
- Dùshēng Zhèn
- Location in Hebei Location in China
- Coordinates: 38°22′49″N 116°33′00″E
- Country: People's Republic of China
- Province: Hebei
- Prefecture-level city: Cangzhou
- County: Cang

Area
  - Total: 69.83 km^{2} (26.96 sq mi)

Population (2010)
  - Total: 41,774
  - Density: 598.2/km^{2} (1,549/sq mi)
- Time zone: UTC+8 (China Standard)

Dusheng (Chinese: 杜生镇; pinyin: Dùshēng Zhèn) is a town located in Cang County, Cangzhou, Hebei, China. According to the 2010 census, Dusheng had a population of 41,774, including 21,465 males and 20,309 females. The population was distributed as follows: 8,242 people aged under 14, 30,394 people aged between 15 and 64, and 3,138 people aged over 65.

== See also ==
- List of township-level divisions of Hebei
