= Cang Prefecture =

Historical administrative division of China

- Traditional Chinese: 滄州
- Simplified Chinese: 沧州
Transcriptions
Standard Mandarin
- Hanyu Pinyin: Cāngzhōu
- Wade–Giles: Ts'ang-chou

Cang Prefecture, also known as Cang Zhou or Cangzhou, was a prefecture of imperial China centered on modern Cang County in Cangzhou Prefecture, Hebei Province, China. It existed intermittently from 517 until 1913.

== Geography ==
The administrative region of Cang Prefecture in the Tang dynasty was in modern eastern Hebei, Tianjin, and northwestern Shandong. It probably included parts of modern:

- Under the administration of Cangzhou, Hebei:
  - Cangzhou
  - Cang County
  - Botou
  - Qing County
  - Huanghua
  - Haixing County
  - Mengcun Hui Autonomous County
  - Yanshan County
  - Nanpi County
- Under the administration of Tianjin:
  - Tianjin
- Under the administration of Binzhou, Shandong:
  - Wudi County
- Under the administration of Dezhou, Shandong:
  - Leling
  - Ningjin County
  - Qingyun County

== History ==
During the late Tang and the Five Dynasties Period, Cang was one of the three prefectures of the de facto independent jiedushi of Yiwu Province.

== Legacy ==
The imperial prefecture was the source of the modern name of Cangzhou, established in 1961.
