= Dengmingsi =

Dengmingsi 灯明寺镇
- Town
- Dēngmíngsì Zhèn
- Location in Hebei Location in China
- Coordinates: 37°53′53″N 116°44′13″E
- Country: People's Republic of China
- Province: Hebei
- Prefecture-level city: Cangzhou
- County: Dongguang County

Area
  - Total: 80.76 km^{2} (31.18 sq mi)

Population (2010)
  - Total: 30,810
  - Density: 381.5/km^{2} (988/sq mi)
- Time zone: UTC+8 (China Standard)

Dengmingsi (Chinese: 灯明寺镇; pinyin: Dēngmíngsì Zhèn) is a town located in Dongguang County, Cangzhou, Hebei, China. According to the 2010 census, Dengmingsi had a population of 30,810, including 15,785 males and 15,025 females. The population was distributed as follows: 4,927 people aged under 14, 22,979 people aged between 15 and 64, and 2,904 people aged over 65.

== See also ==
- List of township-level divisions of Hebei
