= Changguo Township =

Changguo Township 常郭乡
- Rural Township
- Chángguō Xiāng
- Location in Hebei Location in China
- Coordinates: 38°16′59″N 117°14′56″E
- Country: People's Republic of China
- Province: Hebei
- Prefecture-level city: Cangzhou
- County-level city: Huanghua

Area
  - Total: 159.7 km^{2} (61.7 sq mi)

Population (2010)
  - Total: 40,081
  - Density: 250.9/km^{2} (650/sq mi)
- Time zone: UTC+8 (China Standard)

Changguo Township (Chinese: 常郭乡; pinyin: Chángguō Xiāng) is a rural township located in Huanghua, Cangzhou, Hebei, China. According to the 2010 census, Changguo Township had a population of 40,081, including 21,019 males and 19,062 females. The population was distributed as follows: 8,463 people aged under 14, 27,782 people aged between 15 and 64, and 3,836 people aged over 65.

== See also ==
- List of township-level divisions of Hebei
