= Cui'erzhuang =

Cui'erzhuang 崔尔庄镇
- Town
- Cuī'ĕrzhuāng Zhèn
- Location in Hebei Location in China
- Coordinates: 38°17′23″N 116°32′50″E
- Country: People's Republic of China
- Province: Hebei
- Prefecture-level city: Cangzhou
- County: Cang

Area
  - Total: 119.4 km^{2} (46.1 sq mi)

Population (2010)
  - Total: 56,096
  - Density: 469.8/km^{2} (1,217/sq mi)
- Time zone: UTC+8 (China Standard)

Cui'erzhuang (Chinese: 崔尔庄镇; pinyin: Cuī'ĕrzhuāng Zhèn) is a town located in Cang County, Cangzhou, Hebei, China. According to the 2010 census, Cui'erzhuang had a population of 56,096, including 28,904 males and 27,192 females. The population was distributed as follows: 11,153 people aged under 14, 40,966 people aged between 15 and 64, and 3,977 people aged over 65.

== See also ==
- List of township-level divisions of Hebei
