= Huadong Subdistrict, Huanghua =

Huadong Subdistrict 骅东街道
- Subdistrict
- Location in Hebei
- Coordinates: 38°22′14″N 117°21′20″E
- Country: People's Republic of China
- Province: Hebei
- Prefecture-level city: Cangzhou
- County-level city: Huanghua
- Time zone: UTC+8 (China Standard)

Huadong Subdistrict (simplified Chinese: 骅东街道; traditional Chinese: 驊東街道; pinyin: Huádōng Jiēdào) is a subdistrict in Huanghua, Hebei, China. As of 2018, it has 5 residential communities under its administration.

== See also ==
- List of township-level divisions of Hebei
