= Central Xihuan Avenue Subdistrict =

Central Xihuan Avenue Subdistrict 西环中街街道
- Urban Subdistrict
- Xīhuán Zhōngjiē Jiēdào
- Location in Hebei Location in China
- Coordinates: 38°18′21″N 116°50′20″E
- Country: People's Republic of China
- Province: Hebei
- Prefecture-level city: Cangzhou
- District: Yunhe

Area
  - Total: 5.172 km^{2} (1.997 sq mi)

Population (2010)
  - Total: 52,467
- Time zone: UTC+8 (China Standard)

Central Xihuan Avenue Subdistrict (Chinese: 西环中街街道; pinyin: Xīhuán Zhōngjiē Jiēdào) is an urban subdistrict located in Yunhe District, Cangzhou, Hebei, China. According to the 2010 census, Central Xihuan Avenue Subdistrict had a population of 52,467, including 27,060 males and 25,407 females. The population was distributed as follows: 6,797 people aged under 14, 41,570 people aged between 15 and 64, and 4,100 people aged over 65.

== See also ==
- List of township-level divisions of Hebei
