= Shuangfeng Subdistrict, Beijing =

Shuangfeng Subdistrict 双丰街道
- Subdistrict
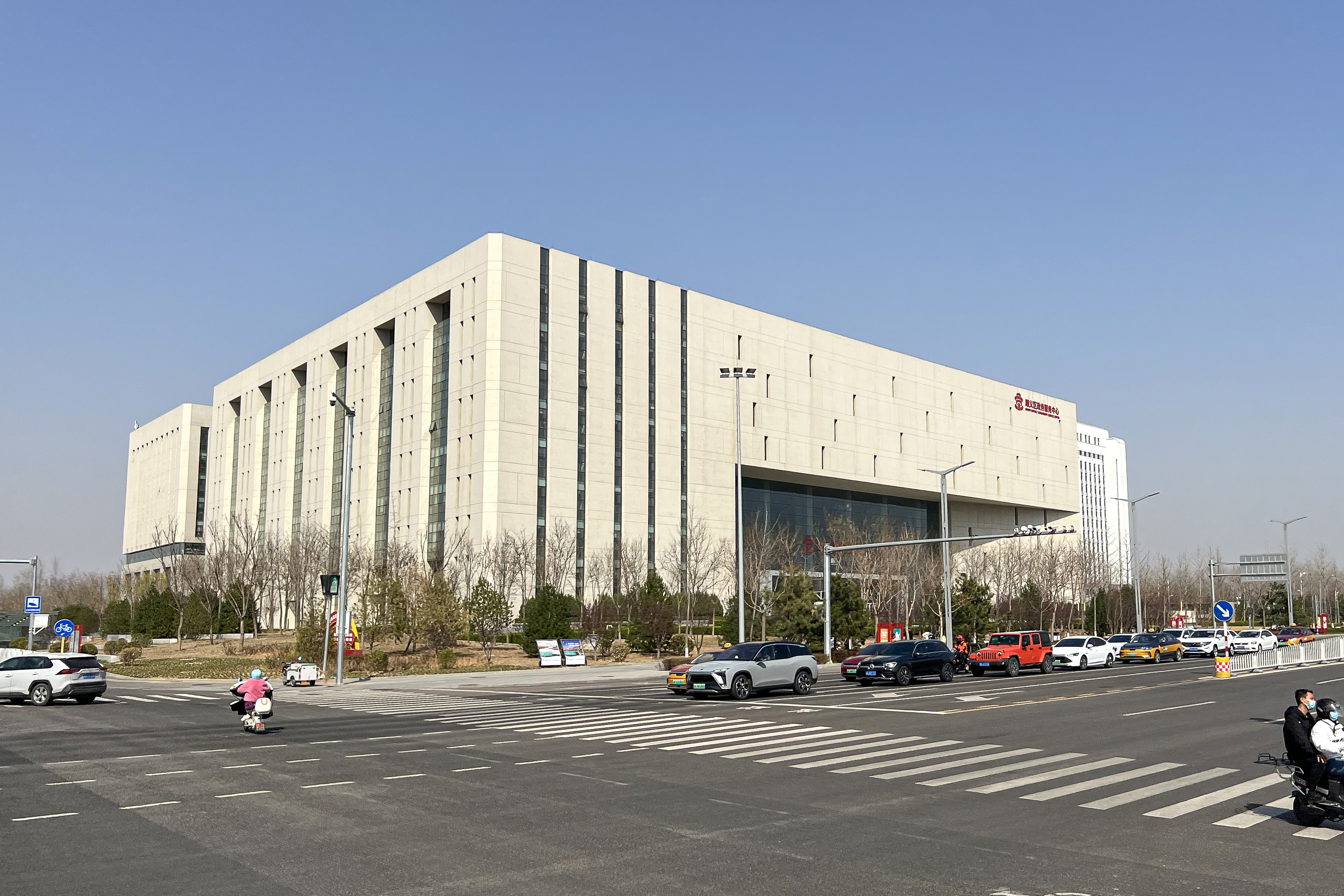
- Government service center of Shunyi District within the subdistrict, 2024

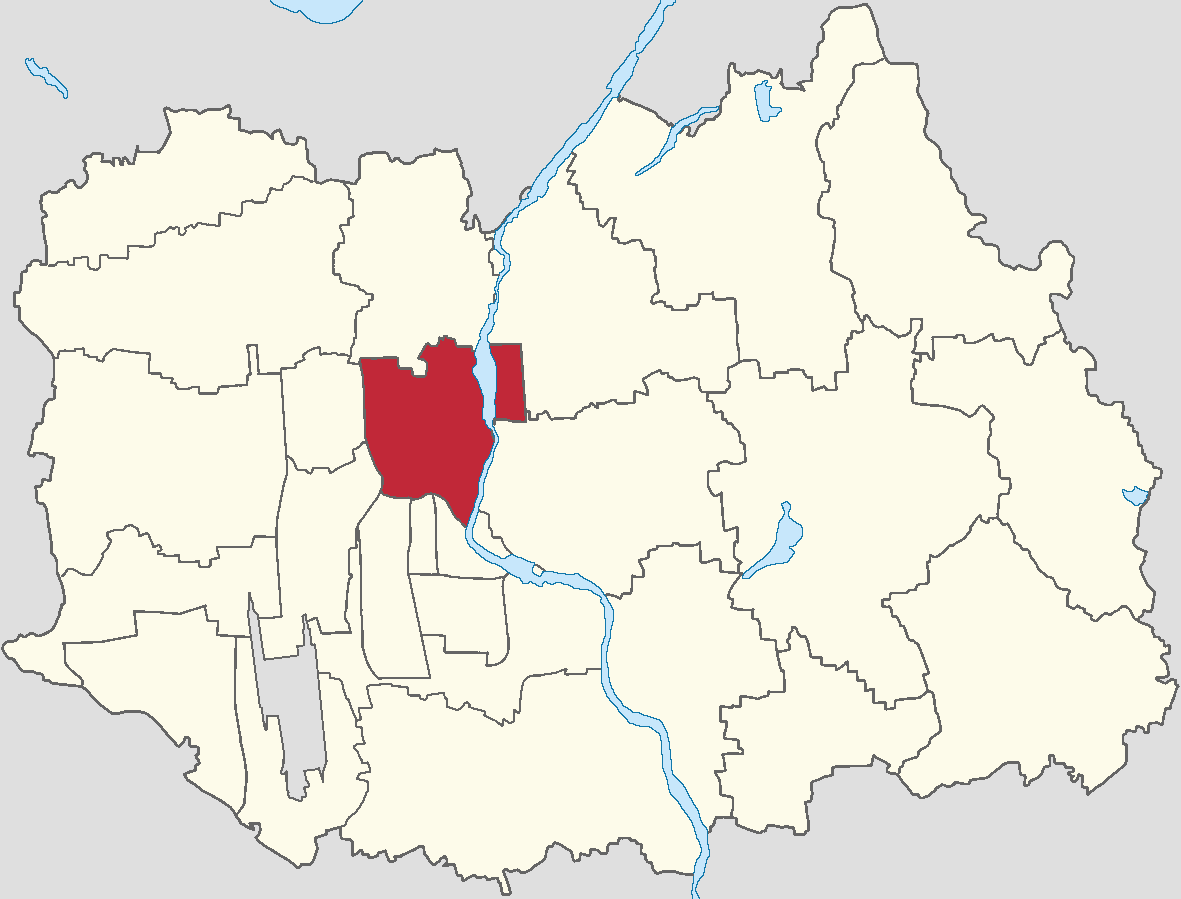
- Location of Shengli Subdistrict within Shunyi District

- Location within Beijing Location within China
- Coordinates: 40°10′11″N 116°39′07″E
- Country: China
- Municipality: Beijing
- District: Shunyi
- Village-level Divisions: 17 communities 15 villages

Area
  - Total: 24.98 km^{2} (9.64 sq mi)

Population (2020)
  - Total: 68,176
  - Density: 2,729/km^{2} (7,069/sq mi)
- Time zone: UTC+8 (China Standard)
- Postal code: 101300
- Area code: 010

Shuangfeng Subdistrict (simplified Chinese: 双丰街道; traditional Chinese: 雙豐街道; pinyin: Shuāngfēng Jiēdào) is a subdistrict situated within Shunyi District, Beijing, China. it is located at the south of Niulanshan Town, west of Beixiaoying and Nancai Towns, north of Guangming, Shengli and Wangquan Subdistricts, and east of Nanfaxin and Mapo Towns. The result of the 2020 Chinese Census determined the subdistrict's population to be 68,176.

The subdistrict was created in 2007 from parts of the surrounding towns and areas.

== Administrative divisions ==
In 2021, Shuangfeng Subdistrict was composed of 32 subdivisions, where 17 were communities and 15 were villages:

Administrative division code	Subdivision names	Name transliteration	Type
110113012001	马坡花园第一	Mapo Huayuan Diyi	Community
110113012002	马坡花园第二	Mapo Huayuan Di'er	Community
110113012003	富力湾	Fuliwan	Community
110113012004	泰和宜园第一	Taihe Yiyuan Diyi	Community
110113012005	新马家园	Xinma Jiayuan	Community
110113012006	顺悦家园第一	Shunyue Jiayuan Diyi	Community
110113012007	金宝花园北区	Jinbao Huayuan Beiqu	Community
110113012008	香悦第一	Xiangyue Diyi	Community
110113012009	北辰花园	Beichen Huayuan	Community
110113012010	中晟馨苑	Zhongsheng Xinyuan	Community
110113012011	香悦第二	Xiangyue Di'er	Community
110113012012	顺兴	Shunxing	Community
110113012013	鲁能润园	Luneng Runyuan	Community
110113012014	花溪渡	Huaxidu	Community
110113012015	鲁能溪园	Luneng Xiyuan	Community
110113012016	顺悦家园第二	Shunyue Jiayuan Di'er	Community
110113012019	香悦第三	Xiangyue Disan	Community
110113012201	向阳	Xiangyang	Village
110113012202	西丰乐	Xifengyue	Village
110113012203	北上坡	Beishangpo	Village
110113012204	大营	Daying	Village
110113012205	东马坡	Dong Mapo	Village
110113012206	肖家坡	Xiaojiapo	Village
110113012207	东丰乐	Dong Fengle	Village
110113012208	小孙各庄	Xiao Sungezhuang	Village
110113012209	西马坡	Xi Mapo	Village
110113012210	白各庄	Baigezhuang	Village
110113012211	秦武姚	Qinwuyao	Village
110113012212	荆卷	Jingjuan	Village
110113012213	向前	Xiangqian	Village
110113012214	庄头	Zhuangtou	Village
110113012215	泥河	Nihe	Village

== Landmark ==
- Shunyi Olympic Rowing-Canoeing Park

== See also ==
- List of township-level divisions of Beijing
