= Xincun Hui Ethnic Township =

- Ethnic township

Chinese transcription(s)
  - Chinese: 新村回族乡
  - Pinyin: Xīncūn Huízú Xiāng
  - Xiao'erjing: سٍڞٌ خُوِذُو سِیْا
- Country: China
- Province: Hebei
- Prefecture: Cangzhou
- County-level city: Huanghua
- Time zone: UTC+8 (China Standard Time)

Xincun Hui Ethnic Township (Chinese: 新村回族乡; pinyin: Xīncūn Huízú Xiāng; Xiao'erjing: سٍڞٌ خُوِذُو سِیْا) is a township-level division situated in Huanghua, Cangzhou, Hebei, China.

== See also ==
- List of township-level divisions of Hebei
