= Huaxi Subdistrict, Huanghua =

Huaxi Subdistrict 骅西街道
- Subdistrict
- Location in Hebei
- Coordinates: 38°22′19″N 117°20′17″E
- Country: People's Republic of China
- Province: Hebei
- Prefecture-level city: Cangzhou
- County-level city: Huanghua
- Time zone: UTC+8 (China Standard)

Huaxi Subdistrict (simplified Chinese: 骅西街道; traditional Chinese: 驊西街道; pinyin: Huáxī Jiēdào) is a subdistrict in Huanghua, Hebei, China. As of 2018, it has 7 residential communities under its administration.

== See also ==
- List of township-level divisions of Hebei
