= Yunhe =

Yunhe may refer to the following places in China:

- Yunhe County (云和县), Lishui, Zhejiang
- Yunhe District (运河区), Cangzhou, Hebei
- Yunhe, Pizhou (运河镇), town in Pizhou City, Xuzhou, Jiangsu
- Yunhe, Xiangshui County (运河镇), town in Xiangshui County, Yancheng, Jiangsu
- Yunhe Subdistrict, Hangzhou (运河街道), in Linping District, Hangzhou, Zhejiang
- Yunhe Subdistrict, Dezhou (运河街道), in Decheng District, Dezhou, Shandong
- Yunhe Subdistrict, Zaozhuang (运河街道), in Tai'erzhuang District, Zaozhuang, Shandong
