= Fenghuadian Township =

Fenghuadian Township 风化店乡
- Rural Township
- Fēnghuàdiàn Xiāng
- Location in Hebei Location in China
- Coordinates: 38°16′54″N 116°59′14″E
- Country: People's Republic of China
- Province: Hebei
- Prefecture-level city: Cangzhou
- County: Cang

Area
  - Total: 125.6 km^{2} (48.5 sq mi)

Population (2010)
  - Total: 40,350
  - Density: 321.3/km^{2} (832/sq mi)
- Time zone: UTC+8 (China Standard)

Fenghuadian Township (Chinese: 风化店乡; pinyin: Fēnghuàdiàn Xiāng) is a rural township located in Cang County, Cangzhou, Hebei, China. According to the 2010 census, Fenghuadian Township had a population of 40,350, including 20,690 males and 19,660 females. The population was distributed as follows: 7,485 people aged under 14, 29,521 people aged between 15 and 64, and 3,344 people aged over 65.

== See also ==
- List of township-level divisions of Hebei
