= Central Nanhuan Road Subdistrict =

Central Nanhuan Road Subdistrict 南环中路街道
- Urban Subdistrict
- Nánhuán Zhōnglù Jiēdào
- Location in Hebei Location in China
- Coordinates: 38°17′29″N 116°50′25″E
- Country: People's Republic of China
- Province: Hebei
- Prefecture-level city: Cangzhou
- District: Yunhe

Area
  - Total: 6.212 km^{2} (2.398 sq mi)

Population (2010)
  - Total: 60,575
- Time zone: UTC+8 (China Standard)

Central Nanhuan Road Subdistrict (Chinese: 南环中路街道; pinyin: Nánhuán Zhōnglù Jiēdào) is an urban subdistrict located in Yunhe District, Cangzhou, Hebei, China. According to the 2010 census, Central Nanhuan Road Subdistrict had a population of 60,575, including 30,167 males and 30,408 females. The population was distributed as follows: 8,272 people aged under 14, 47,789 people aged between 15 and 64, and 4,514 people aged over 65.

== See also ==
- List of township-level divisions of Hebei
