= Chezhan Subdistrict, Cangzhou =

Chezhan Subdistrict 车站街道
- Subdistrict
- Location in Hebei
- Coordinates: 38°18′30″N 116°51′47″E
- Country: People's Republic of China
- Province: Hebei
- Prefecture-level city: Cangzhou
- District: Xinhua
- Village-level divisions: 3 residential communities
- Elevation: 11 m (36 ft)
- Time zone: UTC+8 (China Standard)
- Postal code: 016001
- Area code: 0317

Chezhan Subdistrict (simplified Chinese: 车站街道; traditional Chinese: 車站街道; pinyin: Chēzhàn Jiēdào) is a subdistrict of Xinhua District, Cangzhou, Hebei, People's Republic of China. As of 2011, it has 2 residential communities (社区) under its administration.

== See also ==
- List of township-level divisions of Hebei
