= Cang County =

Cang County 沧县
- County
- Location of the seat in Hebei
- Coordinates: 38°19′N 116°52′E
- Country: People's Republic of China
- Province: Hebei
- Prefecture-level city: Cangzhou

Area
  - Total: 1,527 km^{2} (590 sq mi)

Population (2020)
  - Total: 626,011
  - Density: 410.0/km^{2} (1,062/sq mi)
- Time zone: UTC+8 (China Standard)
- Postal code: 061000
- Area code: 0317

Cang County or Cangxian (simplified Chinese: 沧县; traditional Chinese: 滄縣; pinyin: Cāng Xiàn) is a county of Hebei province, China. It is under the administration of Cangzhou City. County government offices are located in Xinhua District.

== Administrative divisions ==
Towns:

- Xingji (兴济镇), Jiuzhou (旧州镇), Dusheng (杜生镇), Cui'erzhuang (崔尔庄镇)

Townships:

- Zhangguantun Township (张官屯乡), Wangjiapu Township (汪家铺乡), Wulongtang Township (仵龙堂乡), Liujiamiao Township (刘家庙乡), Fenghuadian Township (风化店乡), Yaoguantun Township (姚官屯乡), Daguanting Township (大官厅乡), Gaochuan Township (高川乡), Huangdipu Township (黄递铺乡), Zhifangtou Township (纸房头乡), Xueguantun Township (薛官屯乡), Jiedi Hui Ethnic Township (捷地回族乡), Dulin Hui Ethnic Township (杜林回族乡), Litianmu Hui Ethnic Township (李天木回族乡), Dazhecun Hui Ethnic Township (大褚村回族乡)
