= Cui Shiyuan =

Chinese poet

- Born: 1806; Xian County, Cang Prefecture, Hebei, China
- Died: 1869

Chinese name
- Chinese: 崔士元
Transcriptions
Standard Mandarin
- Hanyu Pinyin: Cuī Shìyuán

Courtesy name
- Traditional Chinese: 次龍
- Simplified Chinese: 次龙
Transcriptions
Standard Mandarin
- Hanyu Pinyin: Cìlóng

Art name
- Traditional Chinese: 雪廬
- Simplified Chinese: 雪庐
Transcriptions
Standard Mandarin
- Hanyu Pinyin: Xuělú

Cui Shiyuan (c. 1806−1869) was a Chinese poet and painter of the Qing Dynasty. He was from Xian County, Cang Prefecture, Hebei.
