= Shiyuan Subdistrict, Beijing =

Shiyuan Subdistrict 石园街道
- Subdistrict
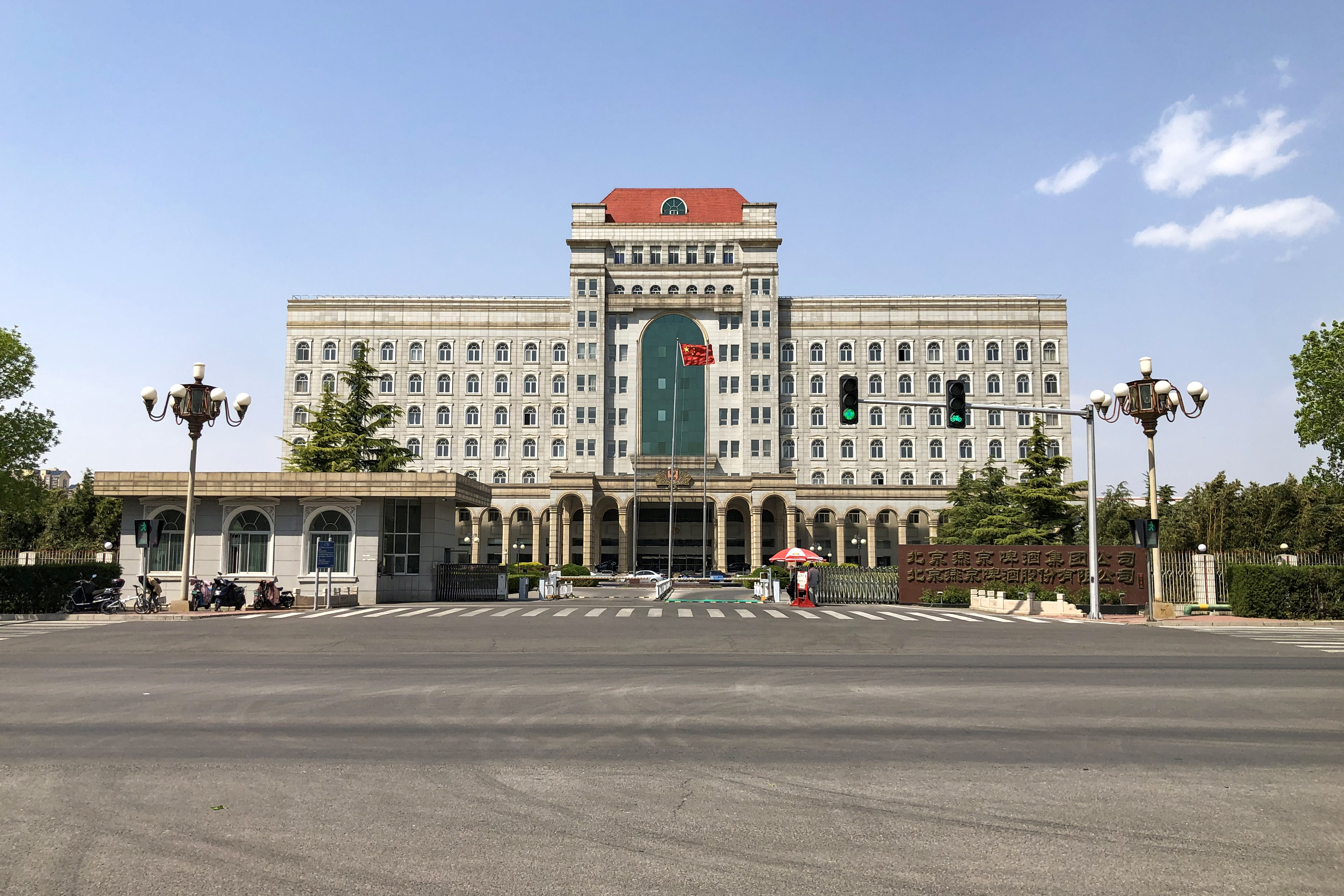
- Headquarter of Beijing Yanjing Brewery, 2020

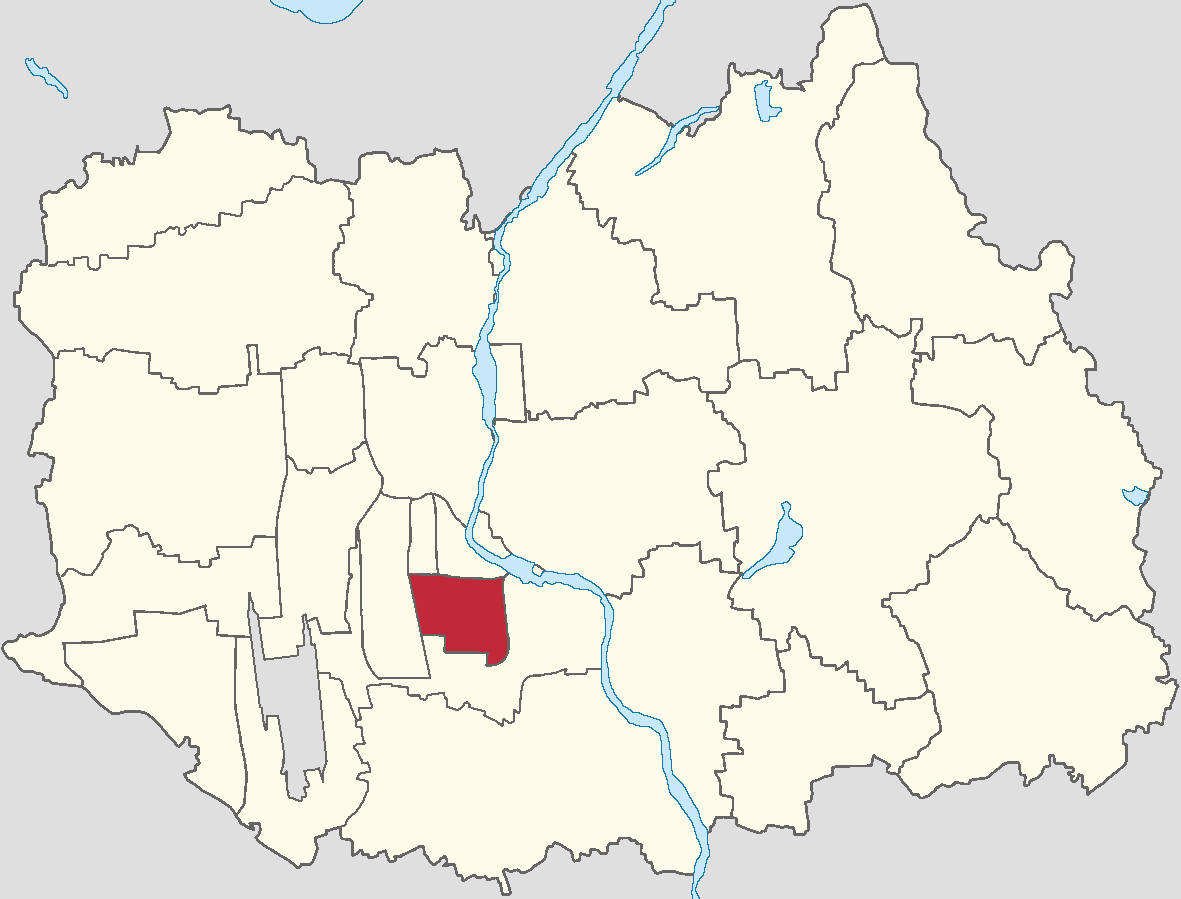
- Location of Shiyuan Subdistrict within Shunyi District

- Location within Beijing Location within China
- Coordinates: 40°06′41″N 116°39′16″E
- Country: China
- Municipality: Beijing
- District: Shunyi
- Village-level Divisions: 16 communities

Area
  - Total: 3.16 km^{2} (1.22 sq mi)

Population (2020)
  - Total: 68,302
  - Density: 21,600/km^{2} (56,000/sq mi)
- Time zone: UTC+8 (China Standard)
- Postal code: 101300
- Area code: 010

Shiyuan Subdistrict (simplified Chinese: 石园街道; traditional Chinese: 石園街道; pinyin: Shíyuán Jiēdào) is a subdistrict located inside of Shunyi District, Beijing, China. It borders Shengli and Guangming Subdistricts in its north, Renhe Town in its east and south, and Wangquan Subdistrict in its west. According to the 2020 census, Shiyuan Subdistrict was home to 68,302 people.

== History ==
Timeline of Shiyuan Subdistrict's History
Year	Status	Belonged to
1958–1983	Part of Chengguan People's Commune	Shunyi County
1983–1987	Part of Chengguan Township	Shunyi County
1987–1990	Part of Chengguan Town	Shunyi County
1990–1998	Part of Shunyi Town	Shunyi County
1998–2001	Part of Shengli Subdistrict and Guangming Subdistrict	Shunyi District
2001–present	Shiyuan Subdistrict	Shunyi District

== Administrative divisions ==
As of 2021, Shiyuan Subdistrict was divided into 16 residential communities. They are listed as follows:

Administrative division code	Subdivision names	Name transliteration
110113010001	五里仓第一	Wulicang Diyi
110113010002	五里仓第二	Wulicang Di'er
110113010003	石园西区	Shiyuan Xiqu
110113010004	石园东区	Shiyuan Dongqu
110113010005	石园北区第一	Shiyuan Beiqu Diyi
110113010006	石园北区第二	Shiyuan Beiqu Di'er
110113010007	石园南区	Shiyuan Nanqu
110113010010	燕京	Yanjing
110113010012	石园东苑	Shiyuan Dongyuan
110113010013	港馨家园第一	Gangxin Jiayuan Diyi
110113010014	港馨家园第二	Gangxin Jiayuan Di'er
110113010015	石园北区第三	Shiyuan Beiqu Disan
110113010016	仁和花园第一	Renhe Huayuan Diyi
110113010017	仁和花园第二	Renhe Huayuan Di'er
110113010018	合院第一	Heyuan Diyi
110113010019	港馨家园第三	Gangxin Jiayuan Disan

== Gallery ==
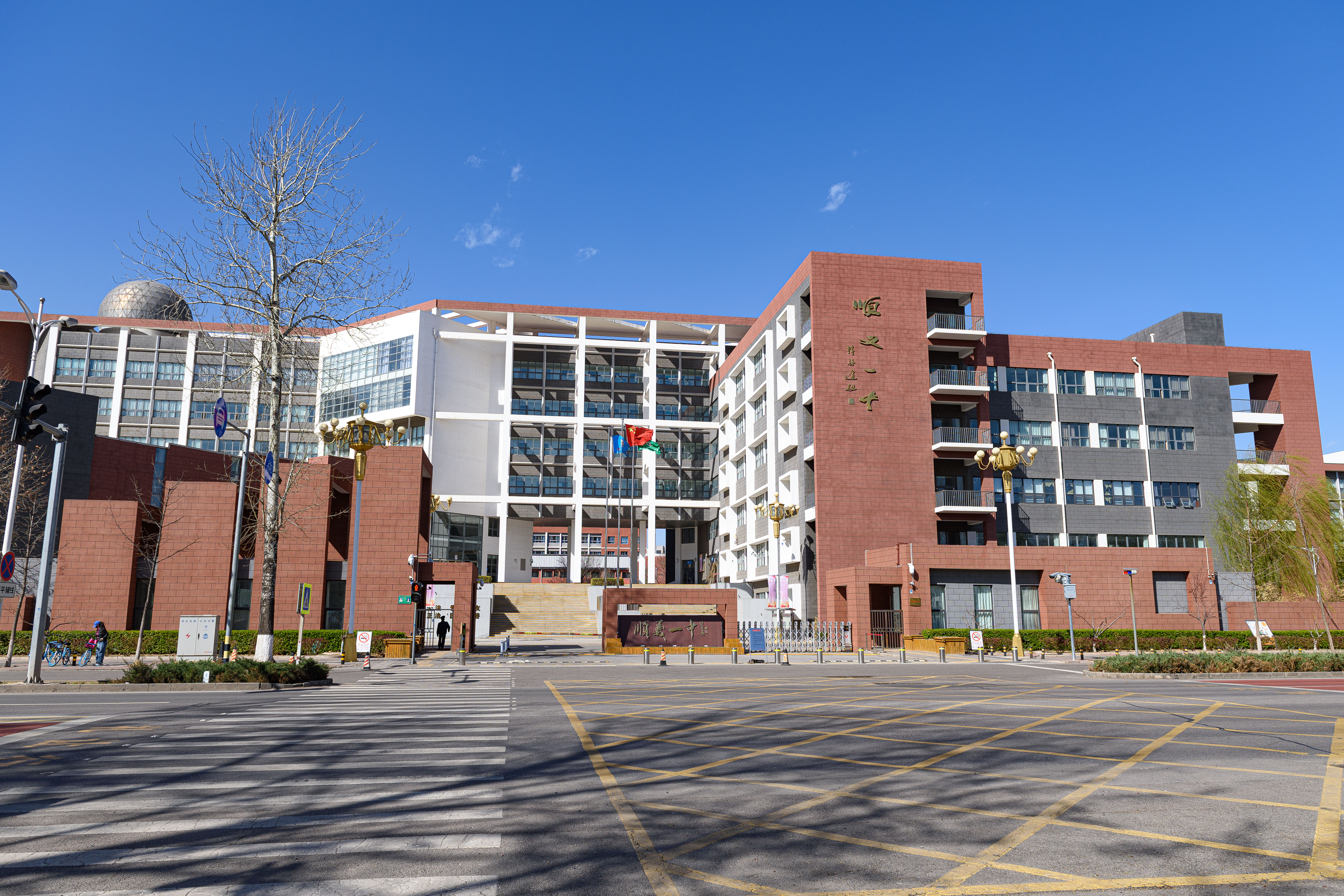
Beijing Shunyi No. 1 High School within the subdistrict, 2024

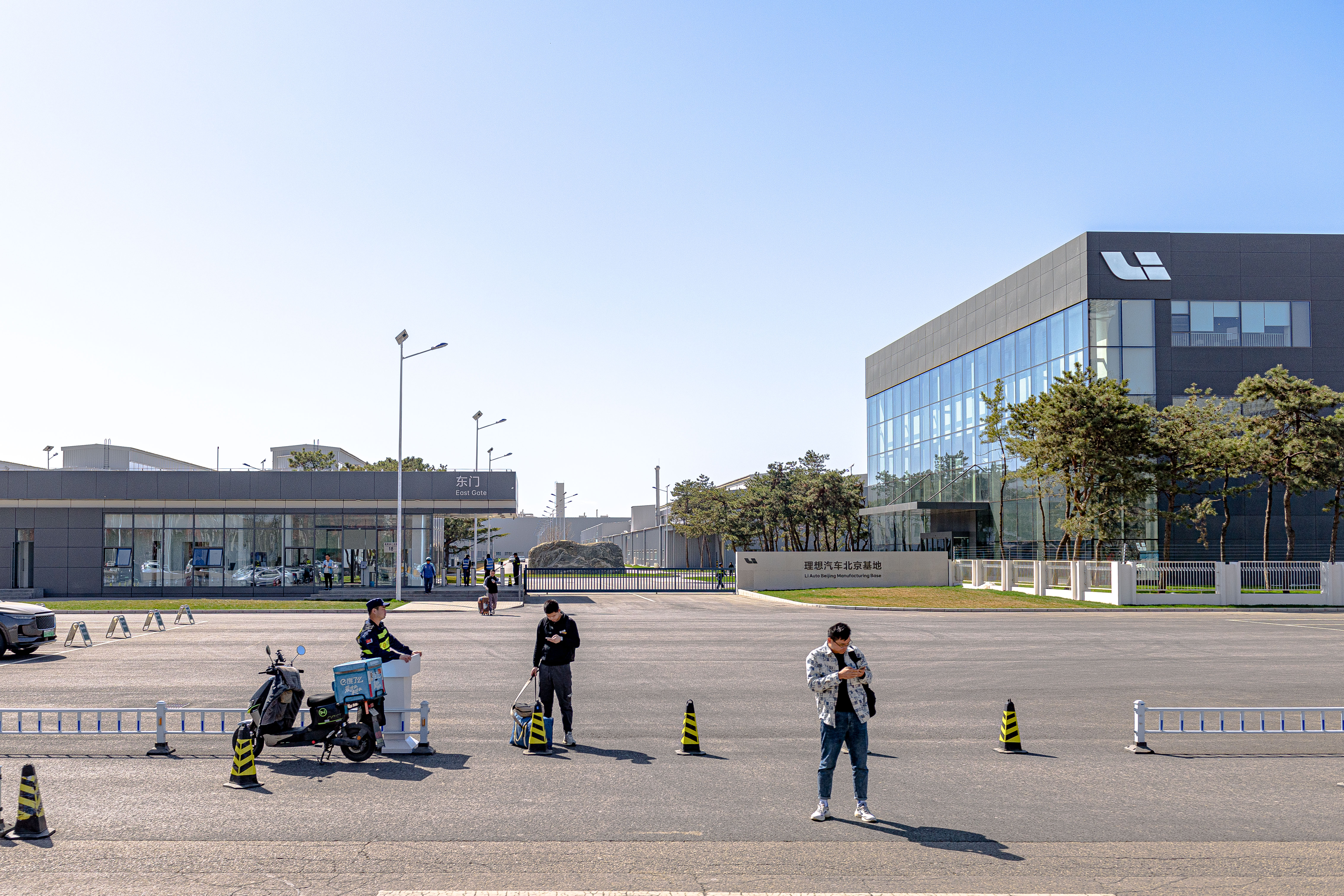
Li Auto manufacturing base within the subdistrict, 2024

== See also ==
- List of township-level divisions of Beijing
