= Dongguang County =

Dongguang County 东光县 Tungkwang
- County
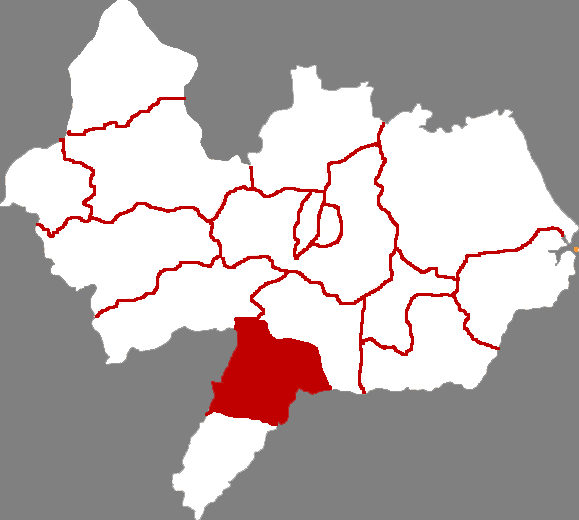
- Dongguang in Cangzhou

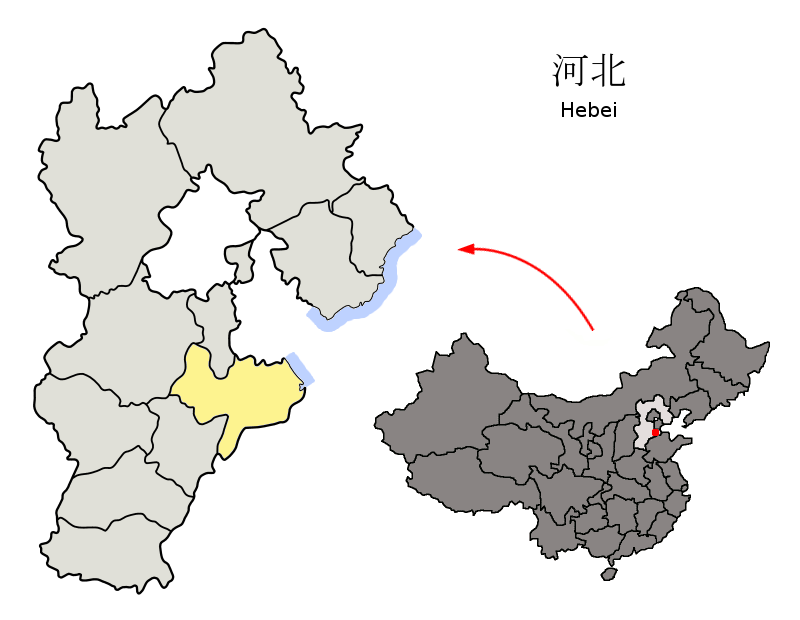
- Cangzhou in Hebei
- Coordinates: 37°54′N 116°45′E
- Country: People's Republic of China
- Province: Hebei
- Prefecture-level city: Cangzhou
- County seat: Dongguang Town (东光镇)

Area
  - Total: 710 km^{2} (270 sq mi)
- Elevation: 16 m (52 ft)

Population (2020)
  - Total: 340,288
  - Density: 480/km^{2} (1,200/sq mi)
- Time zone: UTC+8 (China Standard)
- Postal code: 061600
- Area code: 0317

Dongguang County (simplified Chinese: 东光县; traditional Chinese: 東光縣; pinyin: Dōngguāng Xiàn; lit. 'eastern brightness') is a county under the jurisdiction of the prefecture-level city of Cangzhou, in the east of Hebei province, People's Republic of China, bordering Shandong province to the southeast.

Area is 710 km^{2} (270 sq mi) and population is 340,000 (2020). China National Highway 105 and G2 Beijing–Shanghai Expressway both pass through the county.

== Administrative divisions ==
There are 7 towns and 2 townships under the county's administration.

Towns:

- Dongguang (东光镇), Lianzhen (连镇镇), Zhaowang (找王镇), Qincun (秦村镇), Dengmingsi (灯明寺镇), Nanxiakou (南霞口镇), Dadan (大单镇)

Townships:

- Longwangli Township (龙王李乡), Yuqiao Township (于桥乡)

== Climate ==
Climate data for Dongguang, elevation 14 m (46 ft), (1991–2020 normals, extremes 1981–2010)
Month	Jan	Feb	Mar	Apr	May	Jun	Jul	Aug	Sep	Oct	Nov	Dec	Year
Record high °C (°F)	16.1 (61.0)	22.2 (72.0)	30.7 (87.3)	32.2 (90.0)	39.4 (102.9)	40.8 (105.4)	41.5 (106.7)	36.5 (97.7)	35.7 (96.3)	31.1 (88.0)	24.7 (76.5)	17.7 (63.9)	41.5 (106.7)
Mean daily maximum °C (°F)	3.2 (37.8)	7.2 (45.0)	14.1 (57.4)	21.3 (70.3)	27.2 (81.0)	31.8 (89.2)	32.1 (89.8)	30.5 (86.9)	27.1 (80.8)	20.7 (69.3)	11.7 (53.1)	4.7 (40.5)	19.3 (66.8)
Daily mean °C (°F)	−2.5 (27.5)	1.1 (34.0)	7.7 (45.9)	14.8 (58.6)	21.1 (70.0)	25.8 (78.4)	27.4 (81.3)	25.9 (78.6)	21.3 (70.3)	14.4 (57.9)	6.1 (43.0)	−0.6 (30.9)	13.5 (56.4)
Mean daily minimum °C (°F)	−6.6 (20.1)	−3.4 (25.9)	2.4 (36.3)	9.2 (48.6)	15.2 (59.4)	20.3 (68.5)	23.2 (73.8)	22.0 (71.6)	16.7 (62.1)	9.6 (49.3)	1.8 (35.2)	−4.5 (23.9)	8.8 (47.9)
Record low °C (°F)	−19.2 (−2.6)	−16.7 (1.9)	−10.2 (13.6)	−1.5 (29.3)	5.6 (42.1)	10.1 (50.2)	16.5 (61.7)	13.4 (56.1)	4.5 (40.1)	−4.4 (24.1)	−12.9 (8.8)	−21.0 (−5.8)	−21.0 (−5.8)
Average precipitation mm (inches)	2.6 (0.10)	8.1 (0.32)	8.4 (0.33)	24.8 (0.98)	35.5 (1.40)	78.0 (3.07)	169.9 (6.69)	129.5 (5.10)	35.8 (1.41)	30.5 (1.20)	14.7 (0.58)	3.2 (0.13)	541 (21.31)
Average precipitation days (≥ 0.1 mm)	1.7	2.8	2.4	5.0	5.9	7.9	10.6	9.3	5.9	5.1	3.8	2.1	62.5
Average snowy days	2.8	2.8	1.1	0.2	0	0	0	0	0	0	1.2	2.2	10.3
Average relative humidity (%)	59	56	51	55	58	60	75	79	72	66	66	63	63
Mean monthly sunshine hours	182.6	186.4	241.4	257.3	284.8	260.8	227.8	229.6	223.2	214.1	175.2	173.4	2,656.6
Percentage possible sunshine	60	61	65	65	65	59	51	55	61	62	58	59	60
Source: China Meteorological Administration
