= Huanghua =

Huanghua 黄骅市
- County-level city
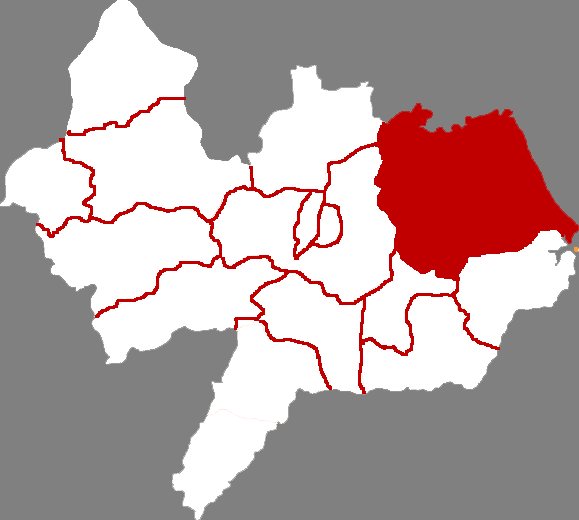
- Huanghua in Cangzhou

- Location of the city center in Hebei
- Coordinates: 38°22′19″N 117°19′48″E
- Country: People's Republic of China
- Province: Hebei
- Prefecture-level city: Cangzhou

Area
  - County-level city: 2,202.0 km^{2} (850.2 sq mi)
  - Urban: 200.00 km^{2} (77.22 sq mi)

Population (2020)
  - County-level city: 652,401
  - Density: 296.28/km^{2} (767.35/sq mi)
  - Urban: 465,826
- Time zone: UTC+8 (China Standard)
- Website: huanghua.gov.cn

Huanghua (simplified Chinese: 黄骅; traditional Chinese: 黃驊; pinyin: Huánghuá) is a county-level city located in the Bohai Gulf coastal region of Hebei province, China. It is under the jurisdiction of the prefecture-level city of Cangzhou.

Huanghua is named after Chinese Communist revolutionary Huang Hua. Previously it was known as Xinqing County (Chinese: 新青县). It has a total area of 1,544 km^{2} (596 sq mi), with a coastline of 65.8 km (40.9 mi). The total administrative population is 652,401 in the entire county, with 465,826 people living in the urban areas.

Huanghua has a seaport, Huanghua Port. It is a stop on the Jinshan Expressway that connects Tianjin with Shantou, Guangdong.

== Administrative divisions ==
Subdistricts:

- Huazhong Subdistrict (骅中街道), Huadong Subdistrict (骅东街道), Huaxi Subdistrict (骅西街道)

Towns:

- Huanghua Town (黄骅镇), Nanpaihe (南排河镇), Jiucheng (旧城镇), Lüqiao (吕桥镇)

Townships:

- Guanzhuang Township (官庄乡), Changguo Township (常郭乡), Qijiawu Township (齐家务乡), Tengzhuangzi Township (滕庄子乡), Yang'erzhuang Hui Ethnic Township (羊二庄回族乡), Xincun Hui Ethnic Township (新村回族乡), Yangsanmu Hui Ethnic Township (羊三木回族乡)

== Climate ==
Huanghua has a four-season, monsoon-influenced humid continental climate (Köppen Dwa), with cold, dry winters, and hot, humid summers. The monthly 24-hour average temperature ranges from −3.3 °C (26.1 °F) to 26.9 °C (80.4 °F), while the annual mean is 12.9 °C (55.2 °F). Close to 60% of the annual rainfall of 545 mm (21.5 in) occurs in July and August alone.

Climate data for Huanghua, elevation 5 m (16 ft), (1991–2020 normals, extremes 1971–present)
Month	Jan	Feb	Mar	Apr	May	Jun	Jul	Aug	Sep	Oct	Nov	Dec	Year
Record high °C (°F)	16.4 (61.5)	21.8 (71.2)	30.7 (87.3)	33.5 (92.3)	38.0 (100.4)	41.6 (106.9)	41.8 (107.2)	37.6 (99.7)	36.2 (97.2)	31.3 (88.3)	24.0 (75.2)	17.6 (63.7)	41.8 (107.2)
Mean daily maximum °C (°F)	2.5 (36.5)	6.2 (43.2)	13.2 (55.8)	20.8 (69.4)	26.9 (80.4)	31.0 (87.8)	31.9 (89.4)	30.5 (86.9)	27.0 (80.6)	20.2 (68.4)	11.2 (52.2)	4.2 (39.6)	18.8 (65.9)
Daily mean °C (°F)	−2.8 (27.0)	0.5 (32.9)	7.0 (44.6)	14.5 (58.1)	20.8 (69.4)	25.3 (77.5)	27.3 (81.1)	26.1 (79.0)	21.6 (70.9)	14.5 (58.1)	5.9 (42.6)	−0.8 (30.6)	13.3 (56.0)
Mean daily minimum °C (°F)	−6.8 (19.8)	−3.8 (25.2)	2.0 (35.6)	8.9 (48.0)	15.2 (59.4)	20.2 (68.4)	23.3 (73.9)	22.4 (72.3)	17.2 (63.0)	10.0 (50.0)	1.8 (35.2)	−4.5 (23.9)	8.8 (47.9)
Record low °C (°F)	−17.4 (0.7)	−18.2 (−0.8)	−9.1 (15.6)	−2.4 (27.7)	6.0 (42.8)	10.4 (50.7)	16.9 (62.4)	14.6 (58.3)	6.1 (43.0)	−1.8 (28.8)	−12.0 (10.4)	−18.7 (−1.7)	−18.7 (−1.7)
Average precipitation mm (inches)	2.9 (0.11)	7.3 (0.29)	7.8 (0.31)	22.6 (0.89)	41.5 (1.63)	81.9 (3.22)	166.3 (6.55)	143.8 (5.66)	39.6 (1.56)	34.2 (1.35)	14.3 (0.56)	3.3 (0.13)	565.5 (22.26)
Average precipitation days (≥ 0.1 mm)	1.9	2.5	2.6	4.7	6.0	8.4	11.5	10.1	5.9	4.9	3.6	1.9	64
Average snowy days	2.6	2.5	1.0	0.1	0	0	0	0	0	0	1.0	1.8	9
Average relative humidity (%)	59	56	51	52	55	61	74	77	68	63	64	61	62
Mean monthly sunshine hours	172.3	174.5	232.1	243.9	272.1	235.8	204.2	204.7	213.1	202.2	167.3	163.2	2,485.4
Percentage possible sunshine	56	57	62	61	61	53	46	49	58	59	56	55	56
Source 1: China Meteorological Administrationall-time August high
Source 2: Weather China
