= Guangming Subdistrict, Beijing =

Guangming Subdistrict 光明街道
- Subdistrict
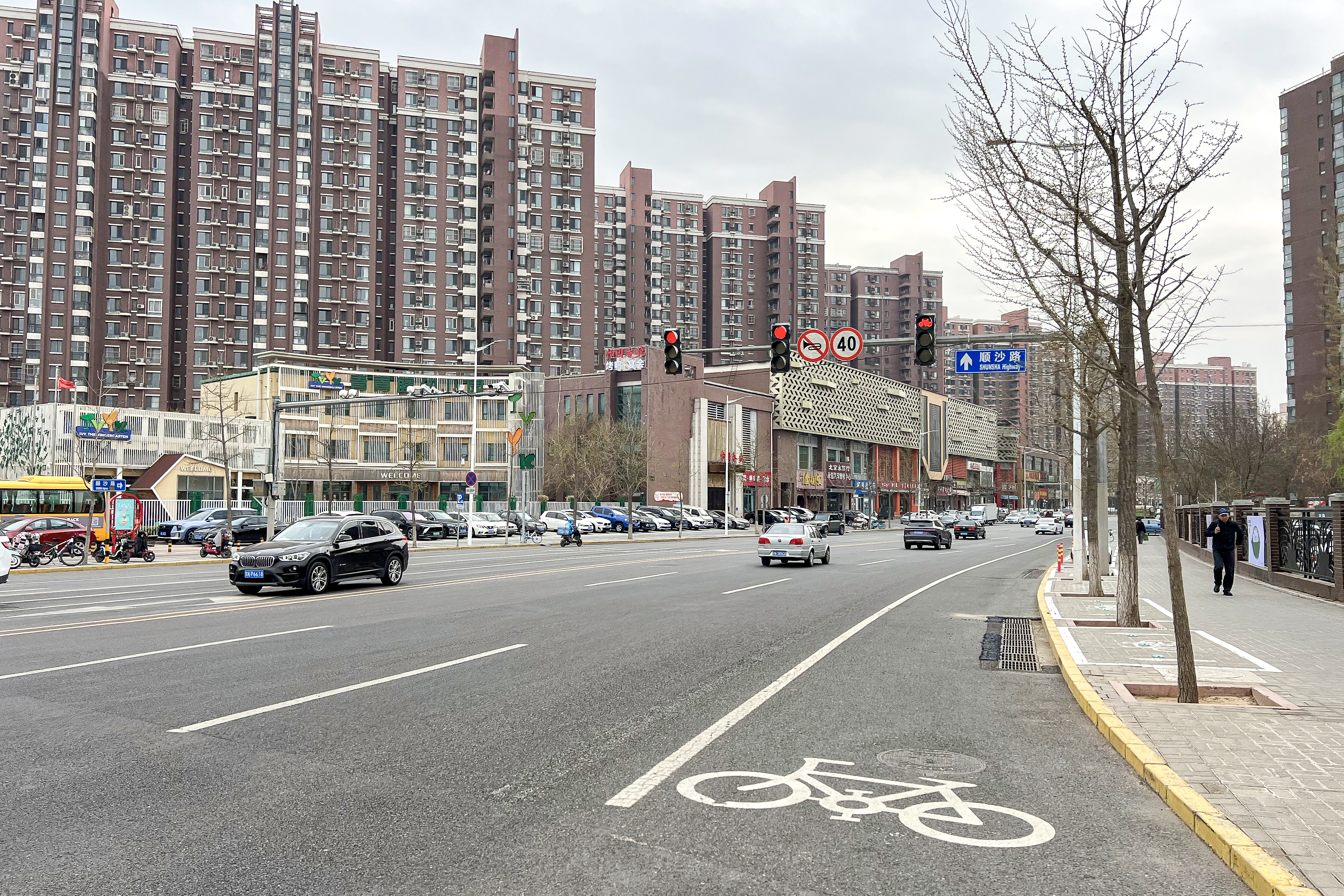
- Start of Shunsha Highway within the subdistrict, 2024

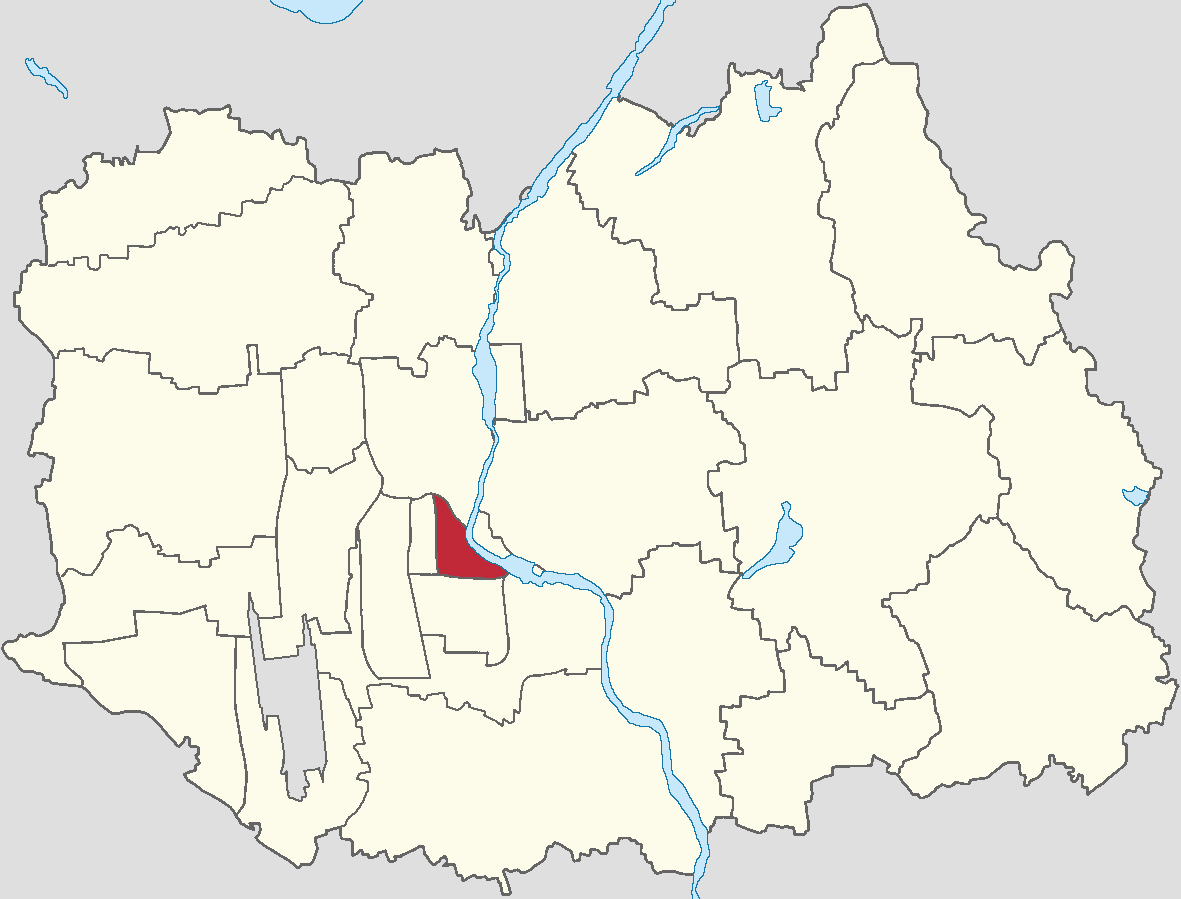
- Location of Guangming Subdistrict within Shunyi District

- Location within Beijing Location within China
- Coordinates: 40°07′45″N 116°39′22″E
- Country: China
- Municipality: Beijing
- District: Shunyi
- Village-level Divisions: 18 communities

Area
  - Total: 4.10 km^{2} (1.58 sq mi)

Population (2020)
  - Total: 70,609
  - Density: 17,200/km^{2} (44,600/sq mi)
- Time zone: UTC+8 (China Standard)
- Postal code: 101300
- Area code: 010

Guangming Subdistrict (Chinese: 光明街道; pinyin: Guāngmíng Jiēdào) is a subdistrict in the center of Shunyi District, Beijing, China. It borders Shuangfeng Subdistrict in its north, Renhe Town in its east, Shiyuan Subdistrict in its south, and Shengli Subdistrict in its west. As of 2020, its population was 70,609.

== History ==
In 1998, Guangming Subdistrict was created as a part of the newly formed Shunyi District. 3 years later, Shiyuan Subdistrict was created from the southern portions of Shengli and Guangming Subdistricts.

== Administrative divisions ==
At the end of 2021, Guangming Subdistrict was divided into the following 18 communities:

Administrative division code	Subdivision names	Name transliteration
110113002006	滨河小区第一	Binhe Xiaoqu Diyi
110113002012	裕龙花园	Yulong Huayuan
110113002016	双拥	Shuangyong
110113002027	裕龙六区	Yulong Liuqu
110113002028	裕龙五区	Yulong Wuqu
110113002029	裕龙四区	Yulong Siqu
110113002030	东兴第一	Dongxing Diyi
110113002031	东兴第二	Dongxing Di'er
110113002032	东兴第三	Dongxing Disan
110113002033	双兴东区	Shuangxing Dongqu
110113002034	幸福东区	Xingfu Dongqu
110113002035	裕龙三区	Yulong Sanqu
110113002036	滨河小区第二	Binhe Xiaoqu Di'er
110113002037	金汉绿港	Jinhan Lügang
110113002038	绿港家园	Lügang Jiayuan
110113002039	裕龙北区	Yulong Beiqu
110113002040	东兴第四	Longxing Disi
110113002041	金港家园	Jingang Jiayuan

== Gallery ==
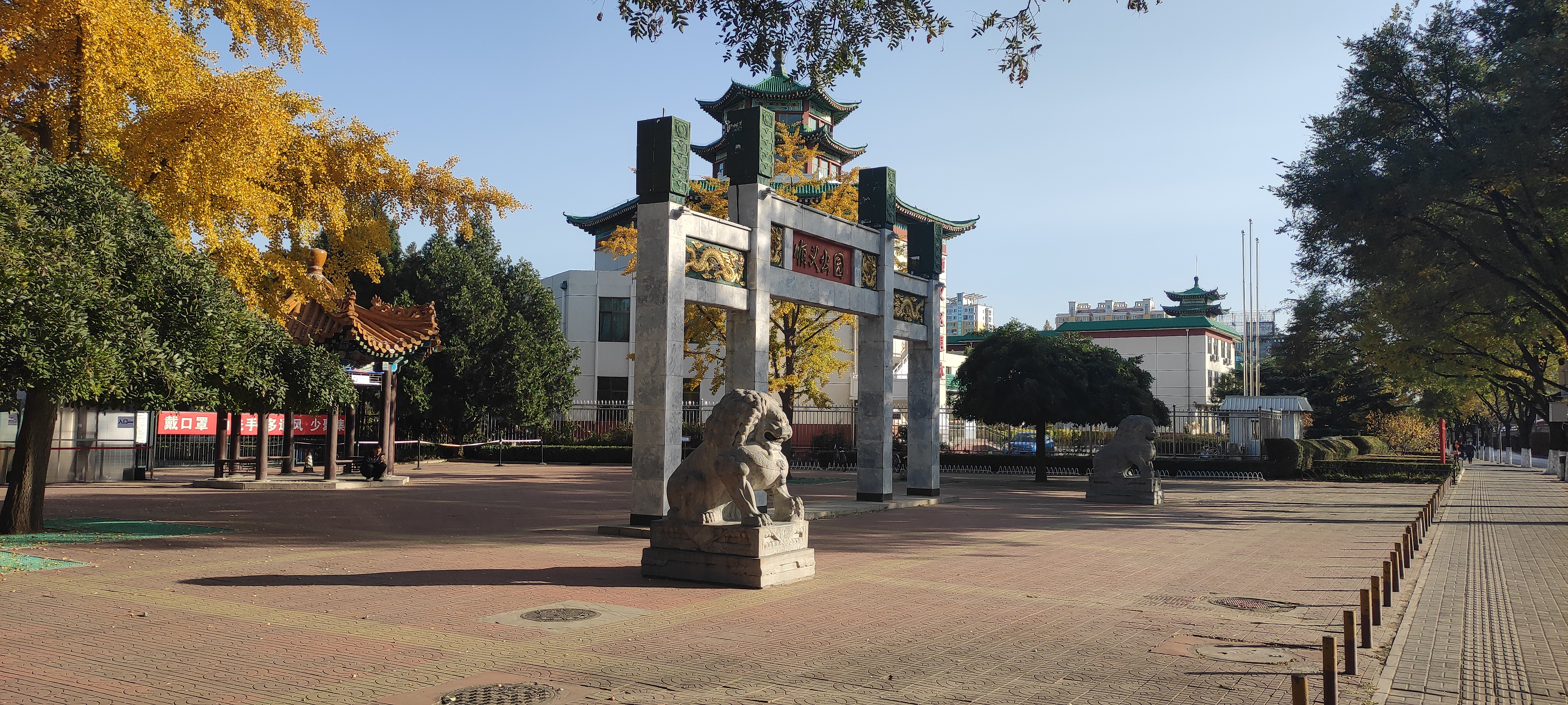
Entrance of Beijing Shunyi Park, 2020

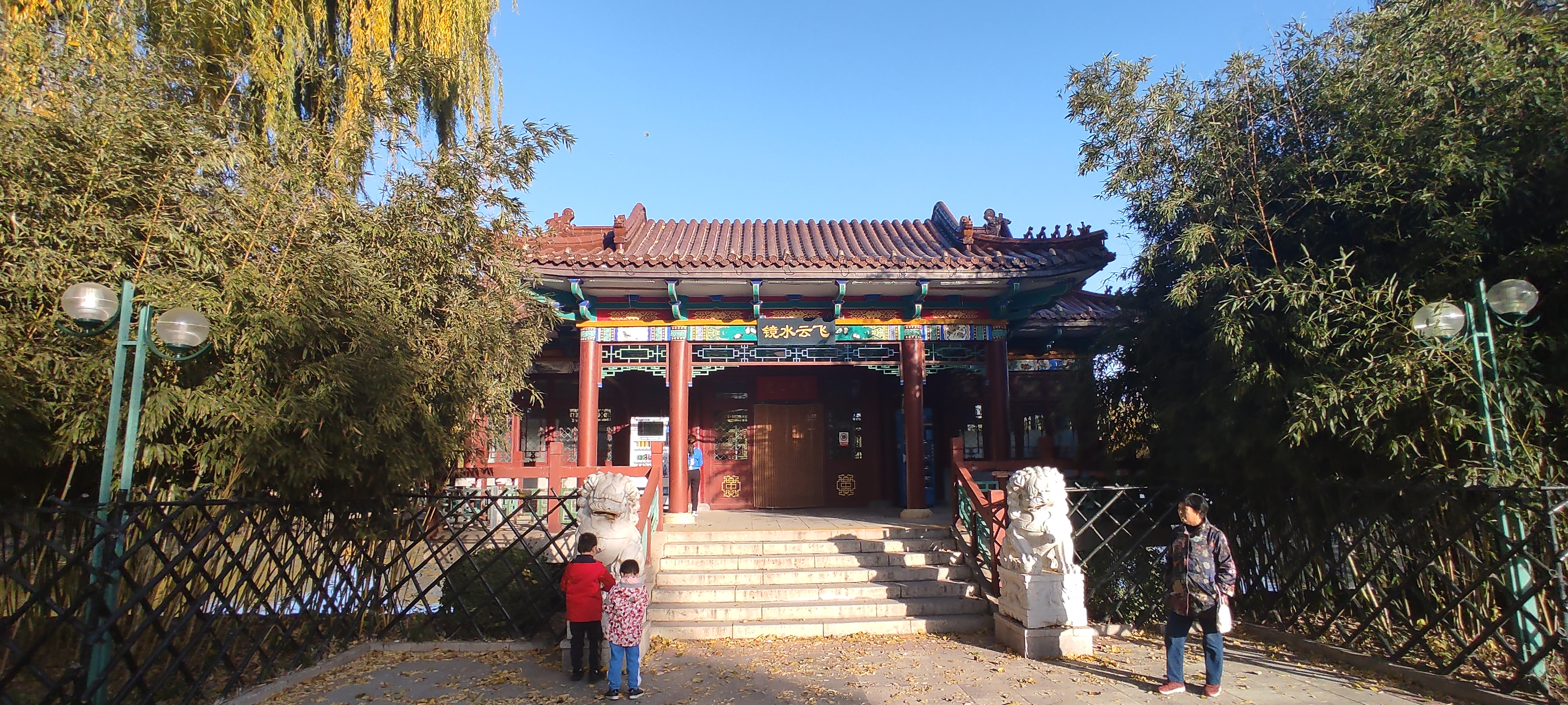
Jingshui Yunfei of the Shunyi Park, 2020

== See also ==
- List of township-level divisions of Beijing
