= Xinhua, Cangzhou =

Coordinates: 38°18′54″N 116°52′00″E

Xinhua 新华区
- District
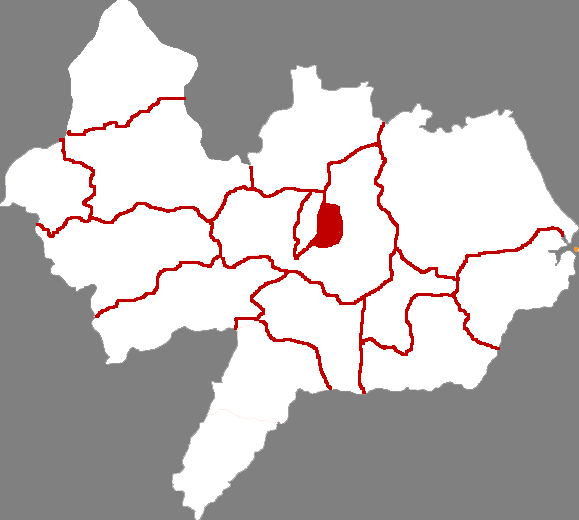
- Xinhua in Cangzhou

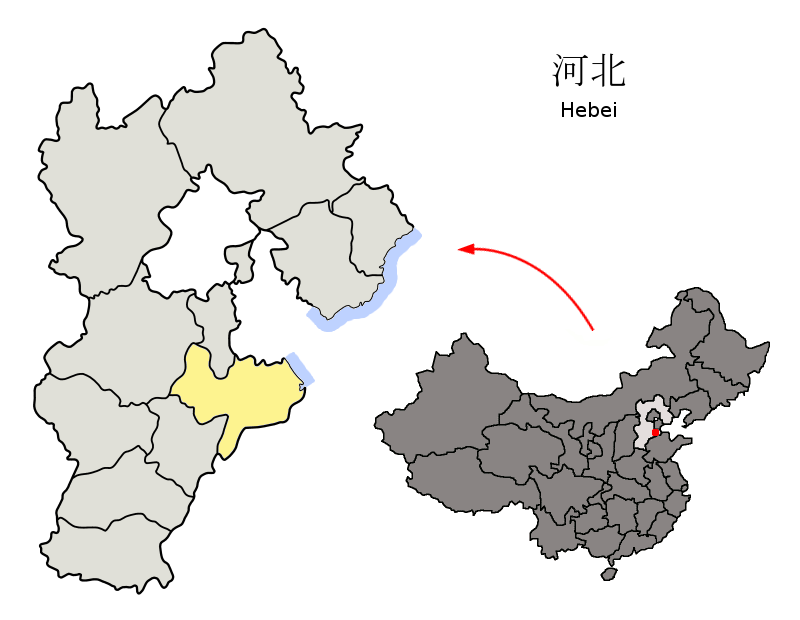
- Cangzhou in Hebei
- Country: People's Republic of China
- Province: Hebei
- Prefecture-level city: Cangzhou

Area
  - Total: 95.72 km^{2} (36.96 sq mi)

Population (2020 census)
  - Total: 284,746
  - Density: 2,975/km^{2} (7,705/sq mi)
- Time zone: UTC+8 (China Standard)

Xinhua District (simplified Chinese: 新华区; traditional Chinese: 新華區; pinyin: Xīnhuá Qū) is a district of the city of Cangzhou, Hebei, China.

== Administrative divisions ==
Subdistricts:

- North Jianshe Avenue Subdistrict (建设北街街道), Chezhan Subdistrict (车站街道), Nanda Avenue Subdistrict (南大街街道), Donghuan Subdistrict (东环街道), Daodong Subdistrict (道东街道)

The only township is Xiaozhaozhuang Township (小赵庄乡)
