= Yunhe, Cangzhou =

Yunhe 运河区
- District
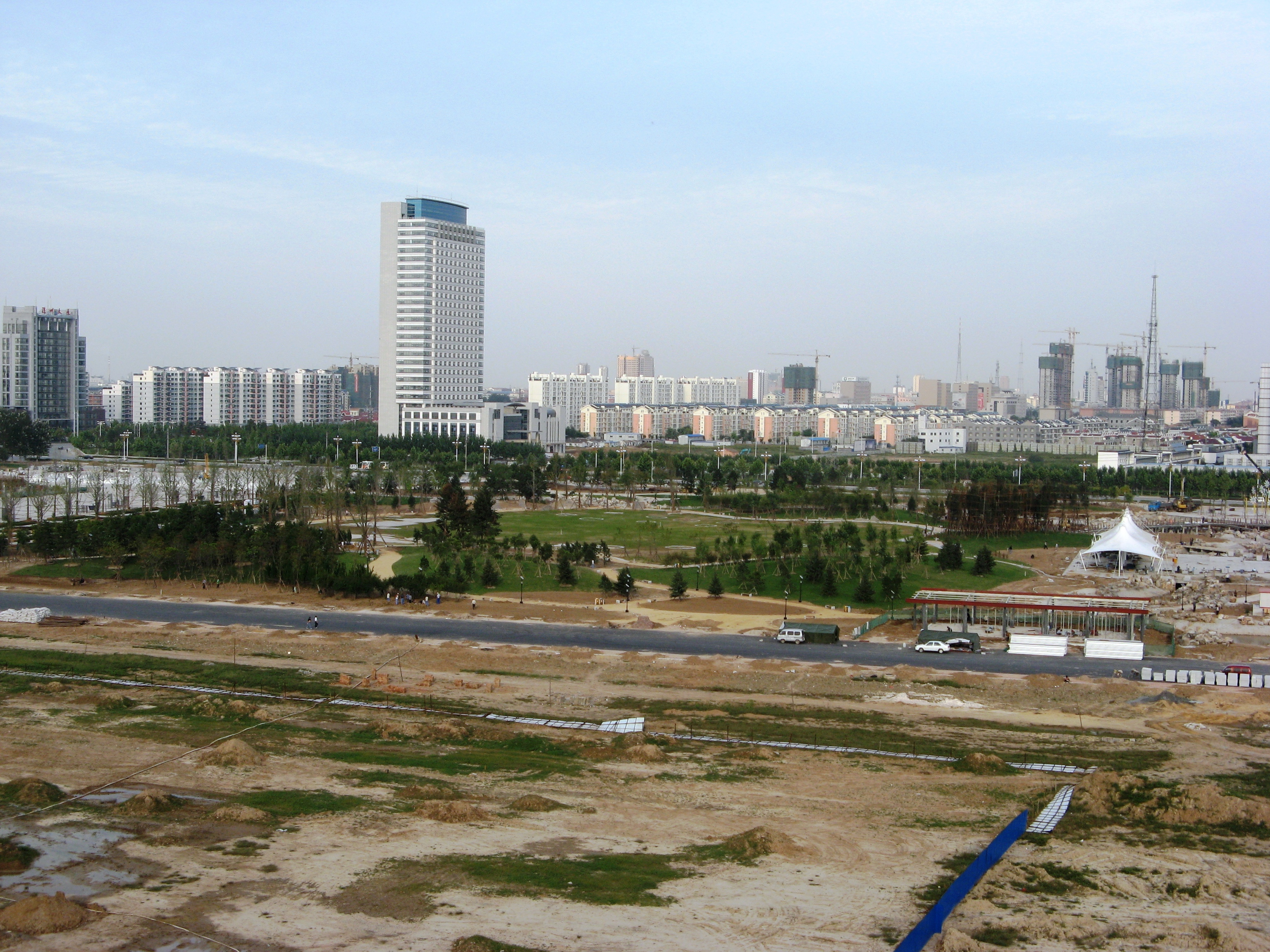

- Location in Hebei
- Coordinates: 38°18′42″N 116°51′00″E
- Country: China
- Province: Hebei
- Prefecture-level city: Cangzhou
- District seat: Shuiyuesi Subdistrict

Area
  - Total: 118.05 km^{2} (45.58 sq mi)

Population (2020 census)
  - Total: 511,086
  - Density: 4,329.4/km^{2} (11,213/sq mi)
- Time zone: UTC+8 (China Standard)
- Website: www.czyh.gov.cn

Yunhe District (simplified Chinese: 运河区; traditional Chinese: 運河區; pinyin: Yùnhé Qū) is a district of Cangzhou, Hebei, China. Its name means "Grand Canal District", referring to the Grand Canal of China that passes through it.

== Administrative Divisions ==
Yunhe District is divided into 6 subdistricts and 2 towns.

6 subdistricts are: Shuiyuesi Subdistrict (水月寺街道), Central Nanhuan Road Subdistrict (南环中路街道), Nanhu Subdistrict (南湖街道), Shichang Subdistrict (市场街道), Central Xihuan Avenue Subdistrict (西环中街街道), Gongyuan Subdistrict (公园街道).

2 towns are: Xiaowangzhuang (小王庄镇), Nanchentun (南陈屯镇).
