= Shengli Subdistrict, Beijing =

Shengli Subdistrict 胜利街道
- Subdistrict
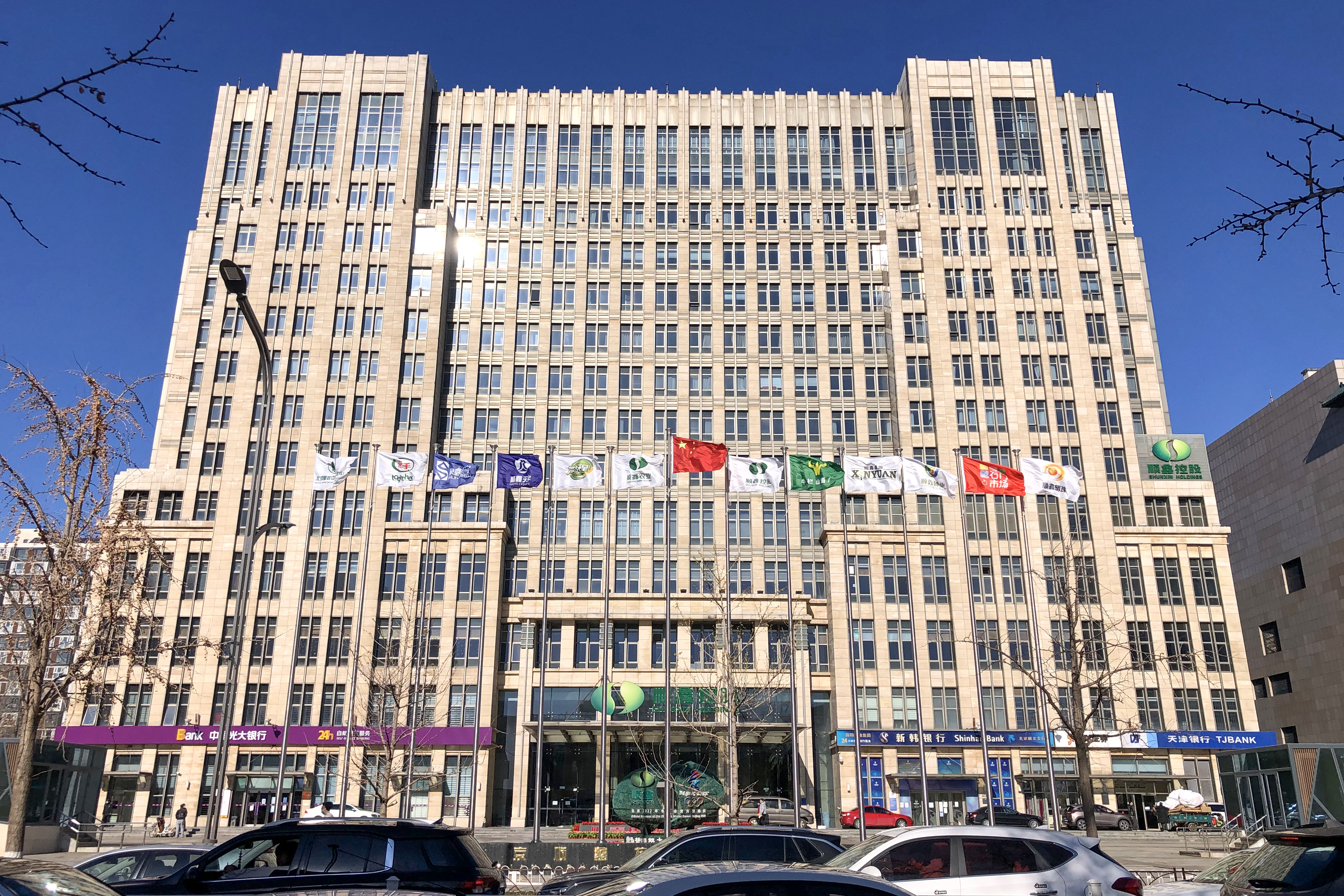
- Shunxin International Business Center, 2020

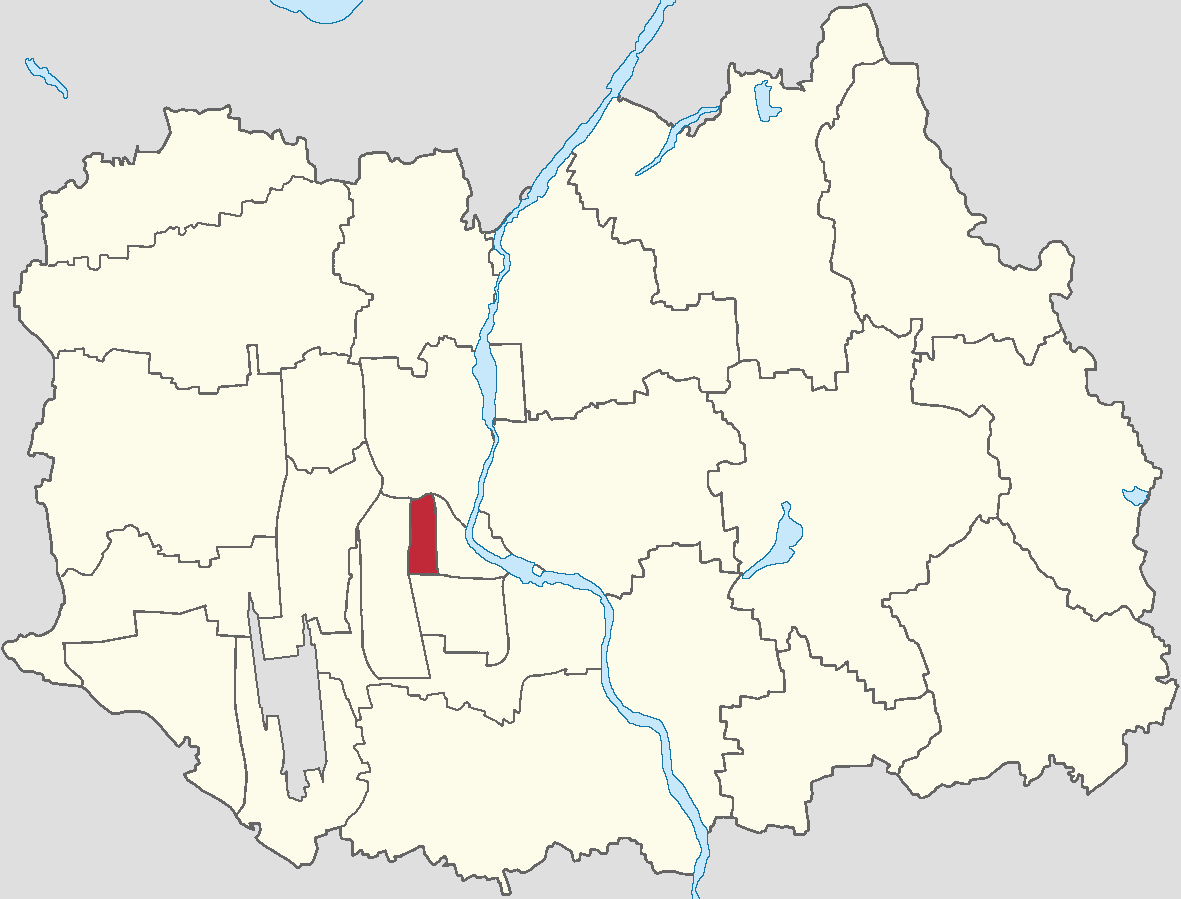
- Location of Shengli Subdistrict within Shunyi District

- Location within Beijing Location within China
- Coordinates: 40°07′13″N 116°39′03″E
- Country: China
- Municipality: Beijing
- District: Shunyi
- Village-level Divisions: 20 communities

Area
  - Total: 2.59 km^{2} (1.00 sq mi)

Population (2020)
  - Total: 46,494
  - Density: 18,000/km^{2} (46,500/sq mi)
- Time zone: UTC+8 (China Standard)
- Postal code: 101300
- Area code: 010

Shengli Subdistrict (simplified Chinese: 胜利街道; traditional Chinese: 勝利街道; pinyin: Shènglì Jiēdào) is a subdistrict on the center of Shunyi District, Beijing, China. It shares border with Shuangfeng Subdistrict to the north, Guangming Subdistrict to the east, Shiyuan Subdistrict to the south, and Wanquan Subdistrict to the west. It had 46,494 inhabitants under its administration as of 2020.

== History ==
History of Shengli Subdistrict
Year	Status	Part of
1958–1983	Chengguan People's Commune	Shunyi County
1983–1987	Chengguan Township	Shunyi County
1987–1990	Chengguan Town	Shunyi County
1990–1998	Shunyi Town (Integrated Pinggezhuang Township in 1990)	Shunyi County
1998–present	Shengli Subdistrict (Southern part separated and became part of Shiyuan Subdistrict in 2001; western portion given to Wangquan Subdistrict in 2008)	Shunyi District

== Administrative divisions ==
In 2021, Shengli Subdistrict was composed of 20 residential communities:

Administrative division code	Subdivision names	Name transliteration
110113001006	幸福西街	Xingfu Xijie
110113001007	义宾街	Yibinjie
110113001008	义宾北区	Yibin Beiqu
110113001009	义宾南区	Yibin Nanqu
110113001010	前进	Qianjin
110113001011	太平	Taiping
110113001012	胜利小区	Shengli Xiaoqu
110113001027	建新北区第一	Jianxin Beiqu Diyi
110113001028	建新北区第二	Jianxin Beiqu Di'er
110113001029	建新北区第三	Jianxin Beiqu Di'san
110113001030	建新南区第一	Jianxin Nanqu Diyi
110113001031	建新南区第二	Jianxin Nanqu Di'er
110113001033	怡馨家园第一	Yixin Jiayuan Diyi
110113001034	怡馨家园第二	Yixin Jiayuan Di'er
110113001035	龙府花园	Longfu Huayuan
110113001037	双兴南区	Shuangxing Nanqu
110113001038	红杉一品	Hongshan Yipin
110113001039	永欣嘉园	Yongxin Jiayuan
110113001040	华玺瀚楟	Huaxi Hanting
110113001041	站前北街	Zhanqian Beijie

== Gallery ==
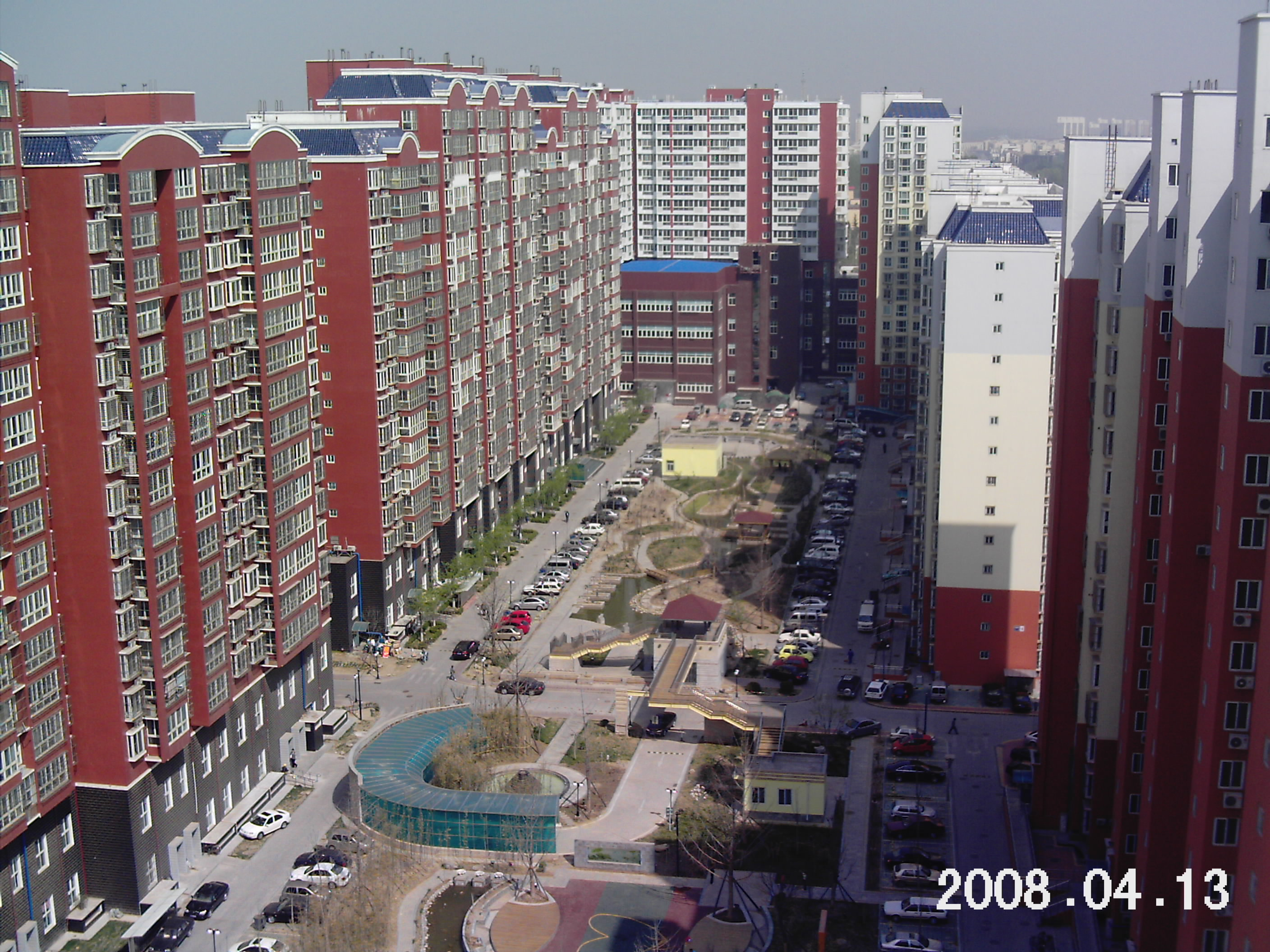
Aerial view of Yixin Jiayuan, 2008

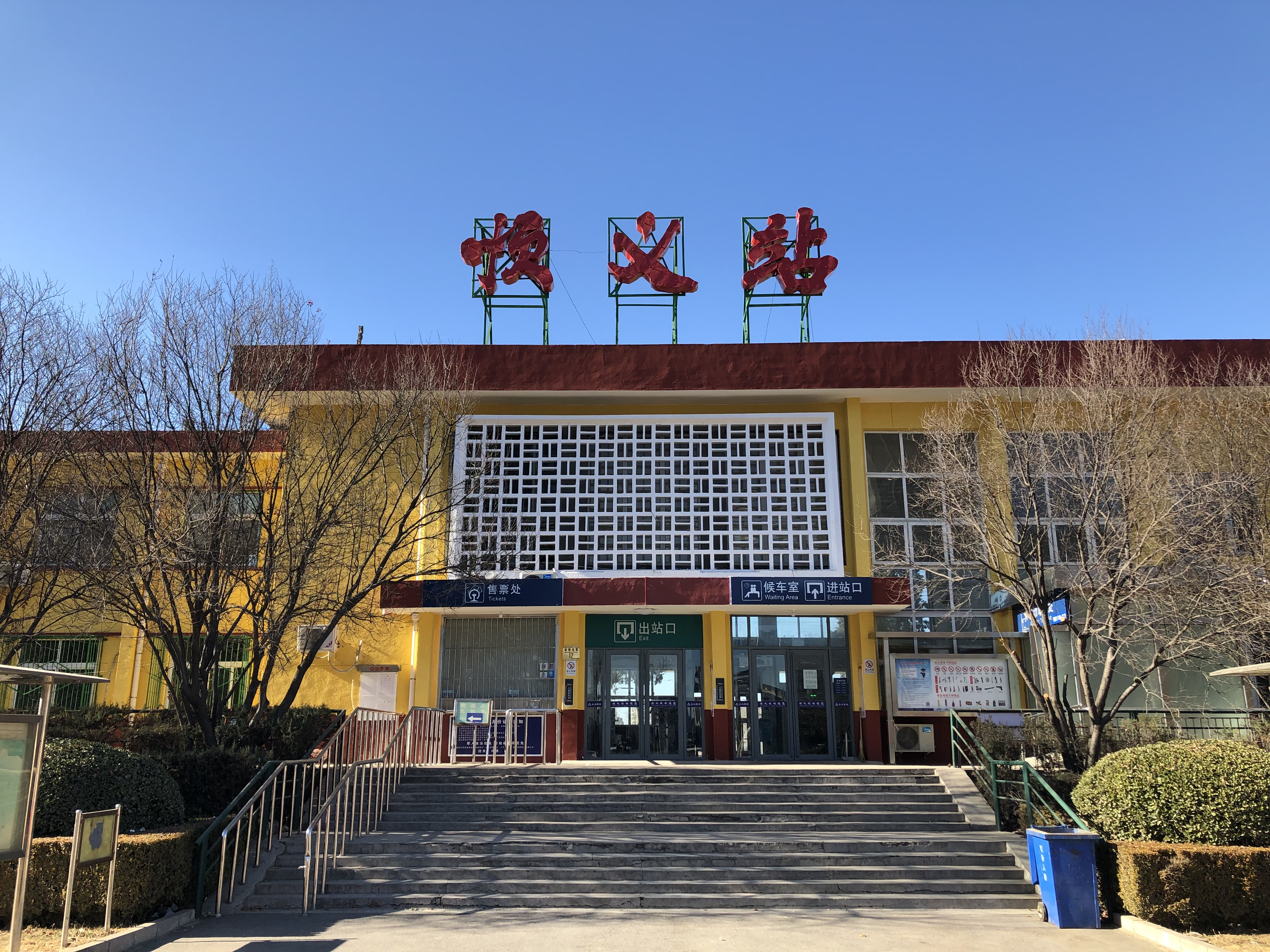
Shunyi Railway station, 2018

== See also ==
- List of township-level divisions of Beijing
