= Cangzhou =

Cangzhou 沧州市 Tsangchow
- Prefecture-level city
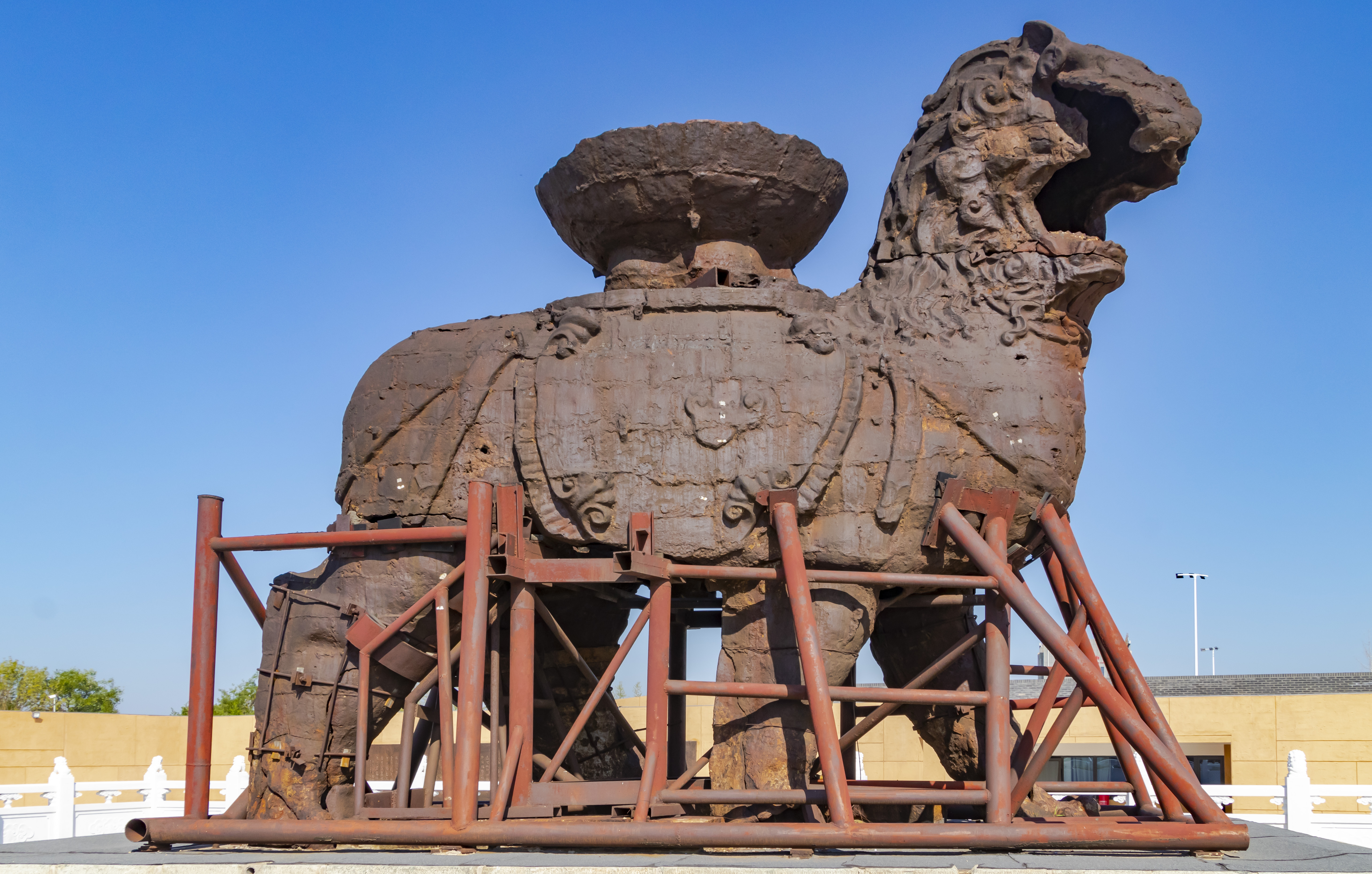
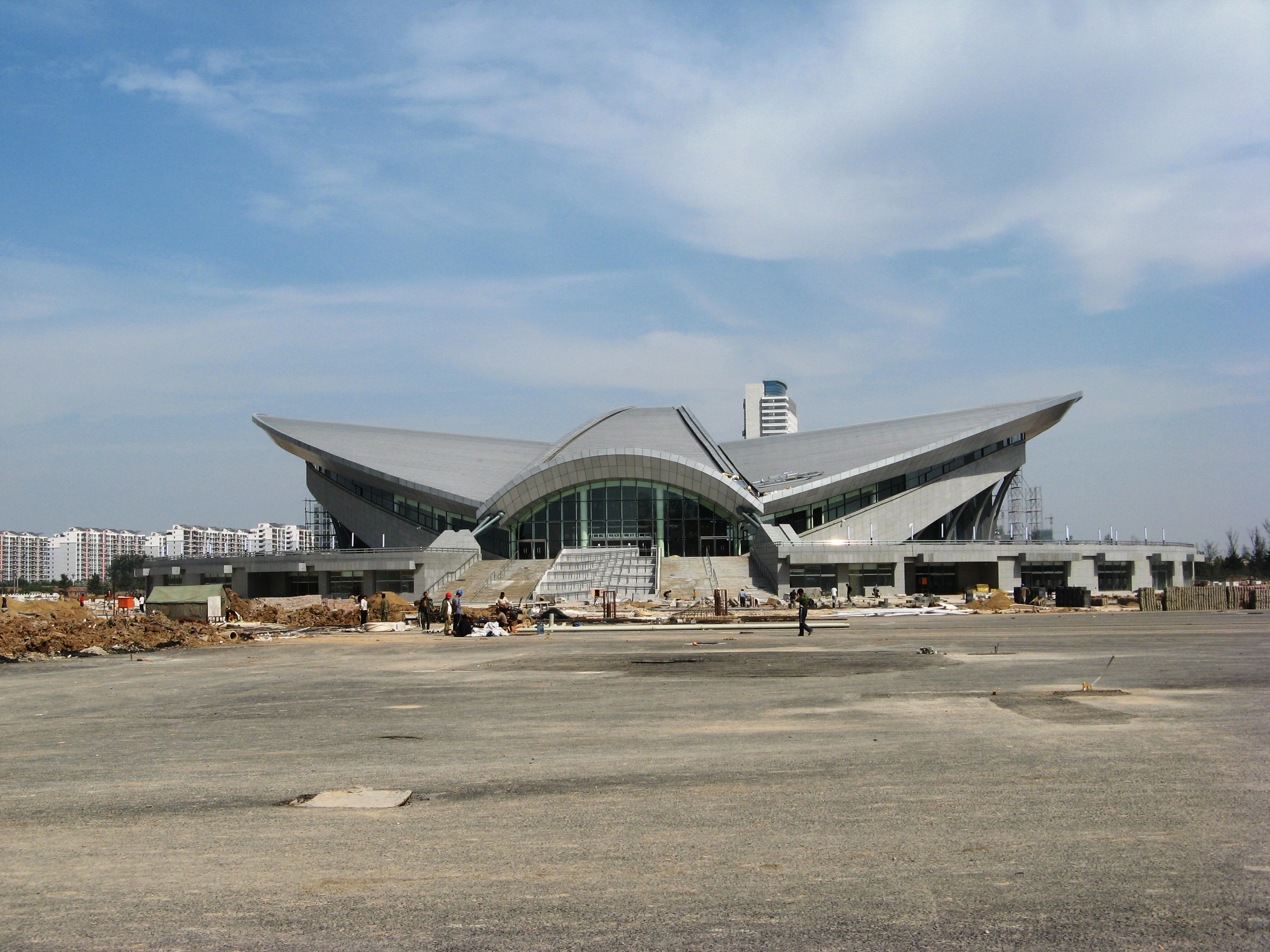
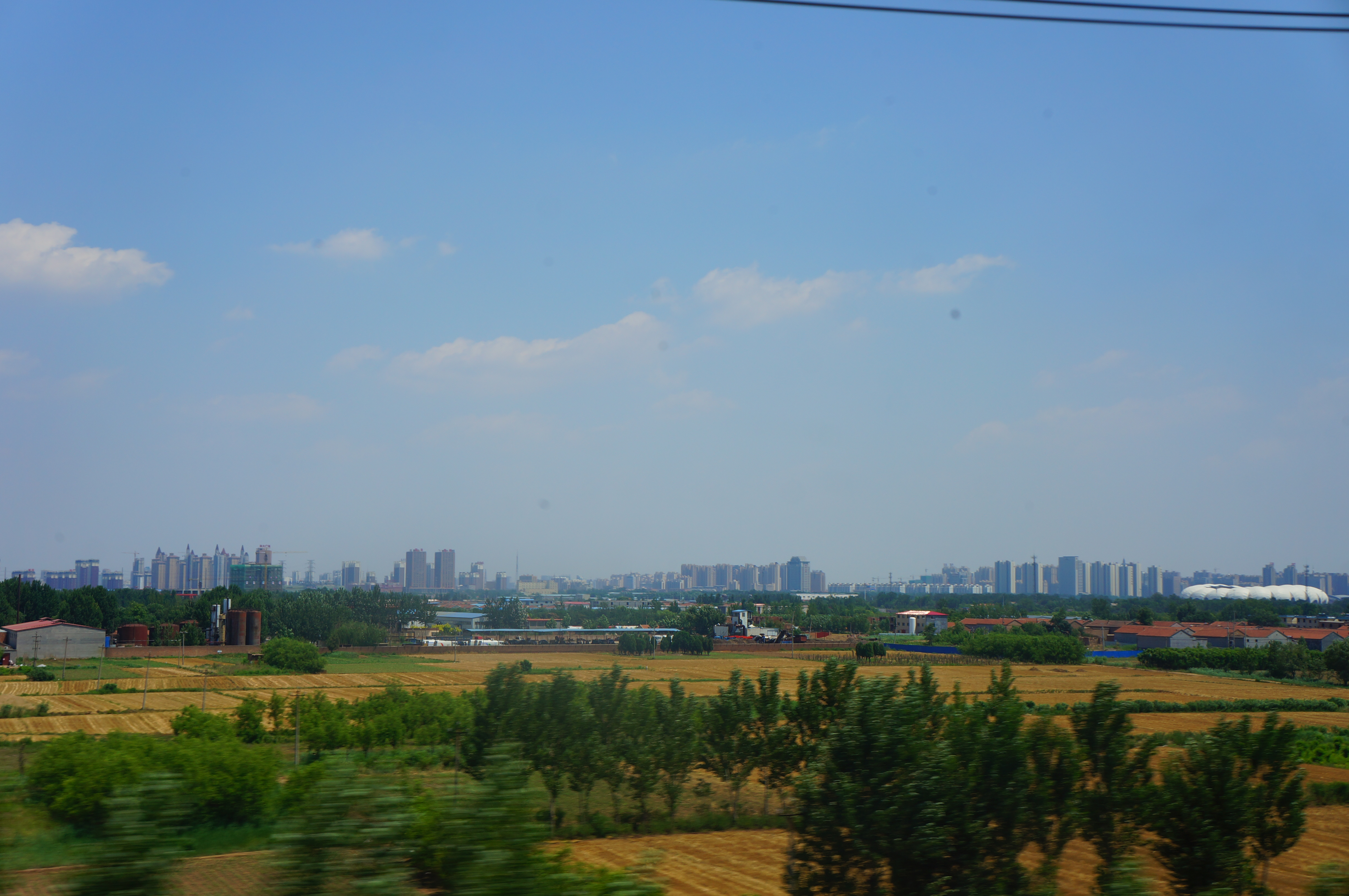
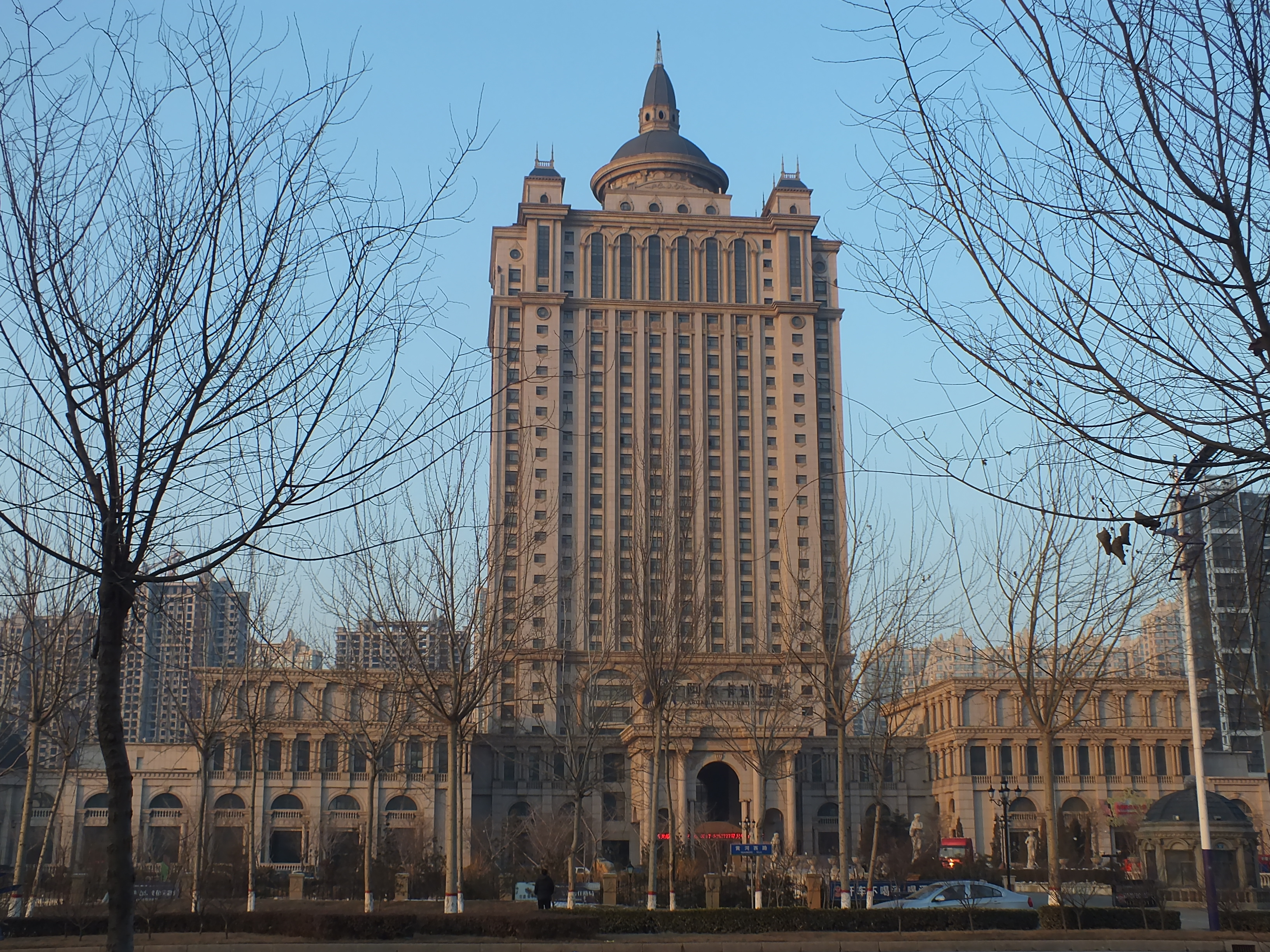
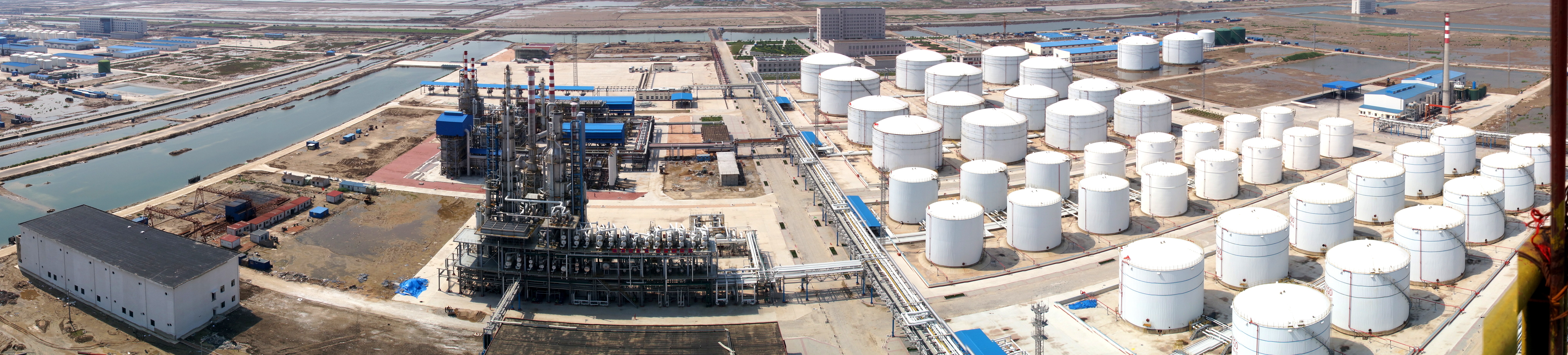
- Iron Lion Cangzhou Arena Skyline of Cangzhou Arcadia Hotel Port of Huanghua
- Nickname: Lion City (狮城)
- Interactive map of Cangzhou
- Location of the city centre in Hebei Cangzhou (Northern China) Cangzhou (China)
- Coordinates (Cangzhou municipal government): 38°18′17″N 116°50′19″E
- Country: People's Republic of China
- Province: Hebei
- Settled: 517
- Established: 15 November 1983
- Municipal seat: Yunhe District

Area
  - Prefecture-level city: 14,383.46 km^{2} (5,553.48 sq mi)
  - Urban: 206.2 km^{2} (79.6 sq mi)
  - Metro: 1,750.7 km^{2} (675.9 sq mi)
- Elevation: 13 m (43 ft)

Population (2020 census)
  - Prefecture-level city: 7,300,783
  - Density: 507.5818/km^{2} (1,314.631/sq mi)
  - Urban: 795,832
  - Urban density: 3,860/km^{2} (9,996/sq mi)
  - Metro: 1,421,843
  - Metro density: 812.16/km^{2} (2,103.5/sq mi)

GDP
  - Prefecture-level city: CN¥ 332 billion US$ 53.3 billion
  - Per capita: CN¥ 44,819; US$7,196
- Time zone: UTC+8 (China Standard)
- Postal code: 061000
- Area code: 0317
- ISO 3166 code: CN-HE-09
- Licence plate prefixes: 冀J
- Website: cangzhou.gov.cn

Cangzhou
- Simplified Chinese: 沧州
- Traditional Chinese: 滄州
- Postal: Tsangchow
Transcriptions
Standard Mandarin
- Hanyu Pinyin: Cāngzhōu
- IPA: [tsʰáŋ.ʈʂóʊ] (locally /tsʰɑŋ˨˧ tʂou˨˧/)

Cangzhou is a prefecture-level city in China forming the southeastern extension of Hebei Province to the coast of the Bohai Sea between Tianjin and Shandong. At the 2020 census, Cangzhou's built-up (or metro) area made of Yunhe district, Xinhua district, and Cang County is largely conurbated with a population of 1,421,843 inhabitants, while the prefecture-level administrative unit in total has a population of 7,300,783. The resident population at the end of 2024 was 7,227,700, a decrease of 36,900 from the end of the previous year. It lies approximately 90 kilometres (56 mi) from the major port city of Tianjin, and 180 km (110 mi) from Beijing.

== History ==
Cangzhou is said to have been founded during the 5th- and 6th-century Southern and Northern Dynasties era of Chinese history. It is named for the former imperial Cang Prefecture. During the late Tang and following Five Dynasties era, it formed part of the territory of the de facto independent jiedushi of Yiwu Province.

== Administrative divisions ==
Cangzhou City comprises 2 districts, 4 county-level cities, 9 counties and 1 autonomous county.

Map
Name	Hanzi	Hanyu Pinyin	Population (2020)	Area (km^{2})	Density (/km^{2})
Yunhe District	运河区	Yùnhé Qū	511,086	138	1,957
Xinhua District	新华区	Xīnhuá Qū	284,746	89	2,472
Botou City	泊头市	Bótóu Shì	573,842	977	563
Renqiu City	任丘市	Rénqiū Shì	816,401	1,023	753
Huanghua City	黄骅市	Huánghuá Shì	652,401	1,545	317
Hejian City	河间市	Héjiān Shì	795,198	1,333	578
Cang County	沧县	Cāng Xiàn	626,011	1,527	432
Qing County	青县	Qīng Xiàn	420,878	968	403
Dongguang County	东光县	Dōngguāng Xiàn	340,288	710	493
Haixing County	海兴县	Hǎixīng Xiàn	189,273	836	263
Yanshan County	盐山县	Yánshān Xiàn	411,356	795	503
Suning County	肃宁县	Sùníng Xiàn	341,919	497	664
Nanpi County	南皮县	Nánpí Xiàn	347,473	794	441
Wuqiao County	吴桥县	Wúqiáo Xiàn	217,986	603	464
Xian County	献县	Xìàn Xiàn	568,418	1,191	479
Mengcun Hui Autonomous County	孟村回族自治县	Mèngcūn Huízú; Zìzhìxiàn	203,507	393	458

== Economics ==
Cangzhou's urban center is a heavily industrial city, but the city's administrative territory also includes strongly agricultural areas, and is well known in China for its Chinese jujubes (Chinese dates), apples and pear (widely known under the export name of Tianjin Ya Pear). The North China Oil Field is within Cangzhou City's jurisdiction. Cangzhou also encompasses a large fishing port and the coal-exporting Huanghua Harbour. Notable International Companies located in Cangzhou Hyundai (Japan), Hage Fittings und Flanschen GmbH (Germany) (Hage Fluid Control Technology (Hebei) Co., Ltd Joint Venture).

== Geography and transportation ==
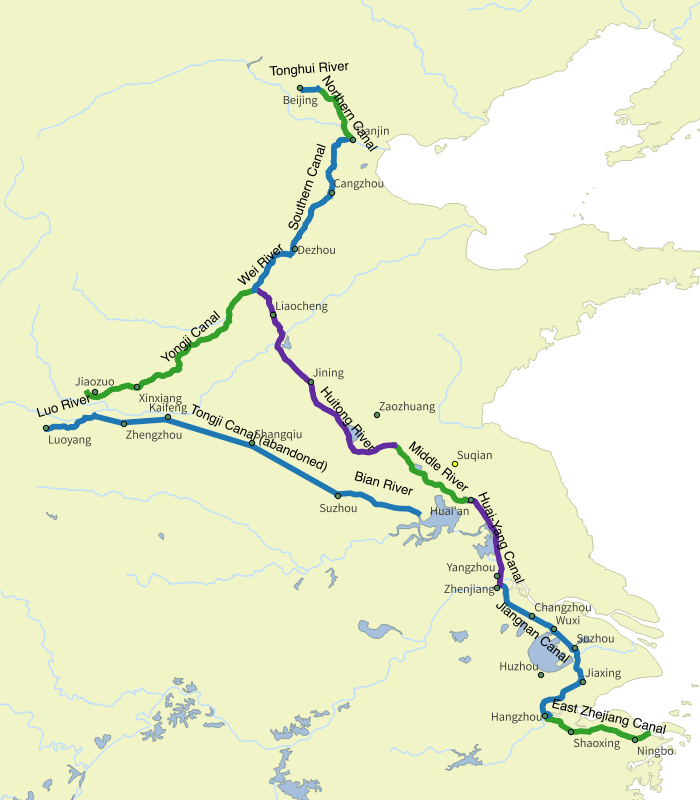
Map of the Grand Canal and vicinity

Cangzhou is located in eastern Hebei, immediately to the south of Tianjin, near the coast of the Bohai Sea of the Pacific Ocean. Bordering prefecture-level cities are Hengshui to the southwest, Baoding to the west, and Langfang to the north. It lies on the Beijing–Shanghai Railway.

The G1811 Huanghua–Shijiazhuang Expressway connects Cangzhou to Shijiazhuang, the provincial capital, and is linked to Beijing via both the G2 Beijing–Shanghai Expressway and G3 Beijing–Taipei Expressway, which are concurrent within the province, and to Shanghai via G2. Cangzhou's Huanghua Harbour is the end of a main Chinese coal shipping railway, the Shuohuang Railway. Other major highways serving Cangzhou's urban area are China National Highway 104 and 307.

Major airports located closest to Cangzhou include Beijing Capital Airport and Tianjin Airport.

The Grand Canal passes directly through Cangzhou, and a district of Cangzhou (Yunhe District) is named after it.

=== Climate ===
Cangzhou has a four-season, monsoon-influenced humid continental climate/semi-arid climate (Köppen BSk/Dwa), with cold, dry winters, and hot, humid summers. The monthly 24-hour average temperature ranges from −3.2 °C (26.2 °F) in January to 27.2 °C (81.0 °F) in July, while the annual mean is 13.25 °C (55.8 °F). A majority of the annual precipitation of 541 mm (21.3 in) occurs in July and August alone. With possible monthly percent possible sunshine ranging from 49% in July to 65% in October, the city receives 2,663 hours of bright sunshine annually.

Climate data for Cangzhou, elevation 8 m (26 ft), (1991–2020 normals, extremes 1951–2010)
Month	Jan	Feb	Mar	Apr	May	Jun	Jul	Aug	Sep	Oct	Nov	Dec	Year
Record high °C (°F)	15.1 (59.2)	18.7 (65.7)	30.9 (87.6)	32.7 (90.9)	37.7 (99.9)	40.3 (104.5)	42.0 (107.6)	36.6 (97.9)	35.0 (95.0)	30.4 (86.7)	24.2 (75.6)	14.6 (58.3)	42.0 (107.6)
Mean daily maximum °C (°F)	2.9 (37.2)	6.9 (44.4)	14.0 (57.2)	21.5 (70.7)	27.4 (81.3)	31.7 (89.1)	32.4 (90.3)	30.8 (87.4)	27.2 (81.0)	20.6 (69.1)	11.5 (52.7)	4.4 (39.9)	19.3 (66.7)
Daily mean °C (°F)	−2.8 (27.0)	1.0 (33.8)	7.7 (45.9)	15.0 (59.0)	21.2 (70.2)	25.7 (78.3)	27.5 (81.5)	26 (79)	21.4 (70.5)	14.5 (58.1)	5.9 (42.6)	−0.9 (30.4)	13.5 (56.4)
Mean daily minimum °C (°F)	−7.1 (19.2)	−3.7 (25.3)	2.3 (36.1)	9.3 (48.7)	15.2 (59.4)	20.3 (68.5)	23.2 (73.8)	21.9 (71.4)	16.5 (61.7)	9.3 (48.7)	1.3 (34.3)	−5.0 (23.0)	8.6 (47.5)
Record low °C (°F)	−22.1 (−7.8)	−14.6 (5.7)	−11.3 (11.7)	−1.2 (29.8)	5.1 (41.2)	12.5 (54.5)	17.1 (62.8)	14.1 (57.4)	6.8 (44.2)	−2.3 (27.9)	−8.3 (17.1)	−20.3 (−4.5)	−22.1 (−7.8)
Average precipitation mm (inches)	2.4 (0.09)	7.5 (0.30)	8.7 (0.34)	22.8 (0.90)	35.9 (1.41)	71.4 (2.81)	153.5 (6.04)	126.5 (4.98)	49.5 (1.95)	36.2 (1.43)	16.0 (0.63)	3.0 (0.12)	533.4 (21)
Average precipitation days (≥ 0.1 mm)	1.6	2.5	2.9	4.8	5.7	8.1	11.5	9.5	5.6	4.7	3.7	1.9	62.5
Average snowy days	2.5	2.1	0.8	0.2	0	0	0	0	0	0	1.0	1.6	8.2
Average relative humidity (%)	57	53	48	50	54	59	73	77	69	64	64	60	61
Mean monthly sunshine hours	174.4	182.3	234.3	253.1	279.5	247.6	215.2	215.3	220.5	209.5	172.3	165.7	2,569.7
Percentage possible sunshine	57	59	63	64	63	56	48	52	60	61	57	56	58
Source: China Meteorological Administration

== Culture ==
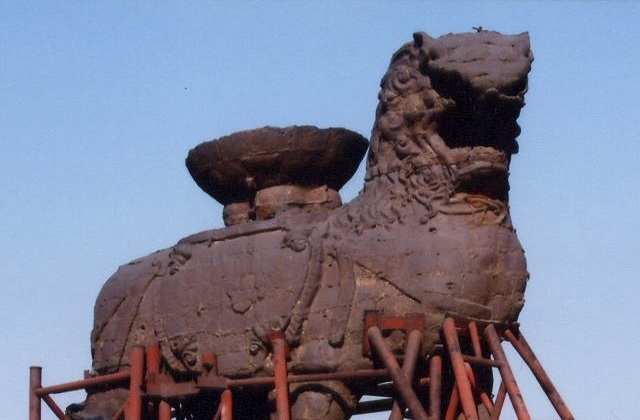
The Iron Lion

The city has historically been known in China for its wushu (Chinese martial arts) and acrobatics (specifically, the Wu Qiao school). Cangzhou is also famed for its historic thousand-year-old 40-ton sculpture, the Iron Lion of Cangzhou. The sculpture is reportedly the largest cast-iron sculpture in the world, cast in 953 in the Five Dynasties and Ten Kingdoms period. The famed lion has even given its name to a locally brewed beer (iron lion beer, 铁狮啤酒) and is a symbol of the city.

Cangzhou is home to a traditional Chinese form of musical performing arts, Kuaiban Dagu.

The city hosts seven mosques for Muslim adherents (mostly Hui). One of them, the West Mosque, has collected at its museum one of China's best collections of Islamic manuscripts and artefacts.

== Demographics and society ==
Cangzhou, though predominated by the Han Chinese majority, is home to a sizable population of the Muslim Hui minority. Intermarriage occasionally occurs between the majority Han and the Hui, but stereotypes of Hui still exist among Cangzhou's Han residents, and some tensions remain. Migration to Hebei province and Cangzhou by Xinjiang Muslim minorities (generally ethnic Uighurs) is increasing.

=== Language ===
The dominant first language of Cangzhou's population is a variety of the northeastern Mandarin dialect continuum termed Cangzhou, which is a variety of Ji Lu Mandarin. There are some similarities with the Tianjin variety and the Baoding variety of Mandarin, but both are considered distinct groups from that of Cangzhou. Dialects of the Cangzhou area vary between localities and counties, though are generally intelligible among each other.

== Municipal government ==
The city, like all other Chinese administrative divisions, has a party committee, the People's government, the People's Congress, and the Political consultative conference.

== Military ==
Cangzhou is home to the Cangzhou Airbase of the People's Liberation Army Air Force.

== Sports ==
Shijiazhuang Ever Bright moved to Cangzhou and changed their name to Cangzhou Mighty Lions, they play at the Cangzhou Stadium.The club withdrew from the Chinese professional football league system prior to the 2025 season and ceased operations

== Education ==
Cangzhou Normal University (沧州师范学院): now it has 871 teacher staff, including 607 full-time teachers, 233 people with the title of deputy senior or above, and 405 people with master's and doctor's degrees. The school motto is "knowing, morality, knowledge and behaviour, innovation" (明德、博学、知行、日新).

There is one international school in Cangzhou, the Cangzhou Zhenhua Korean International School (沧州振华韩国国际学校).

== Notable residents ==
- Sun Yue (1985), fifth Chinese national to play in the NBA
- Wang Zi-Ping (1881–1973), Chinese martial arts grandmaster
- Jia Qinglin (1940), former member of Politburo Standing Committee and Chairman of CPPCC
- Zhang Lichang (1939–2008), former member of Politburo and Party Secretary of Tianjin.
