= Tianzhu, Beijing =

Tianzhu Town 天竺镇
- Town
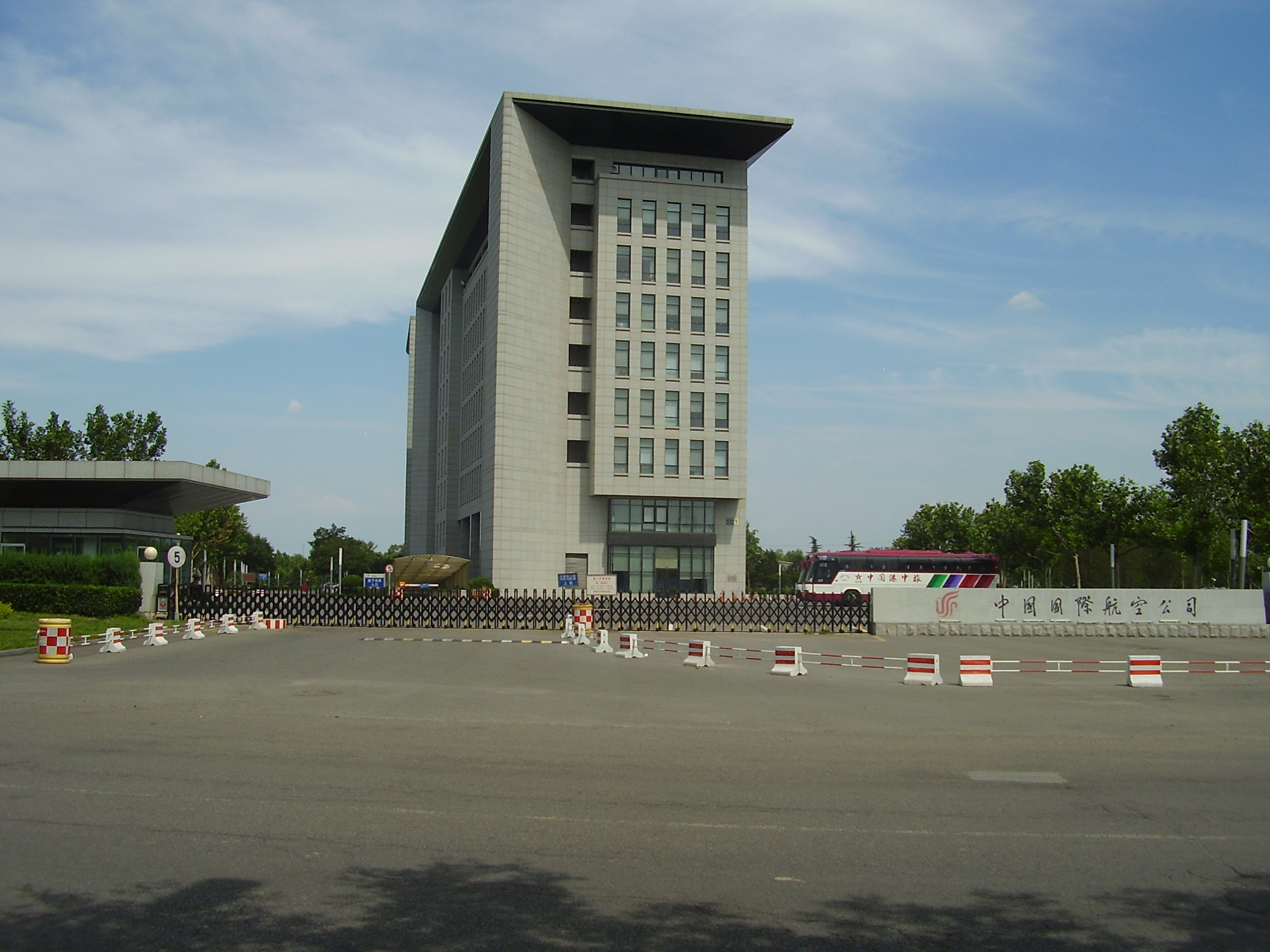
- Building that is a part of Air China headquarters, 2020

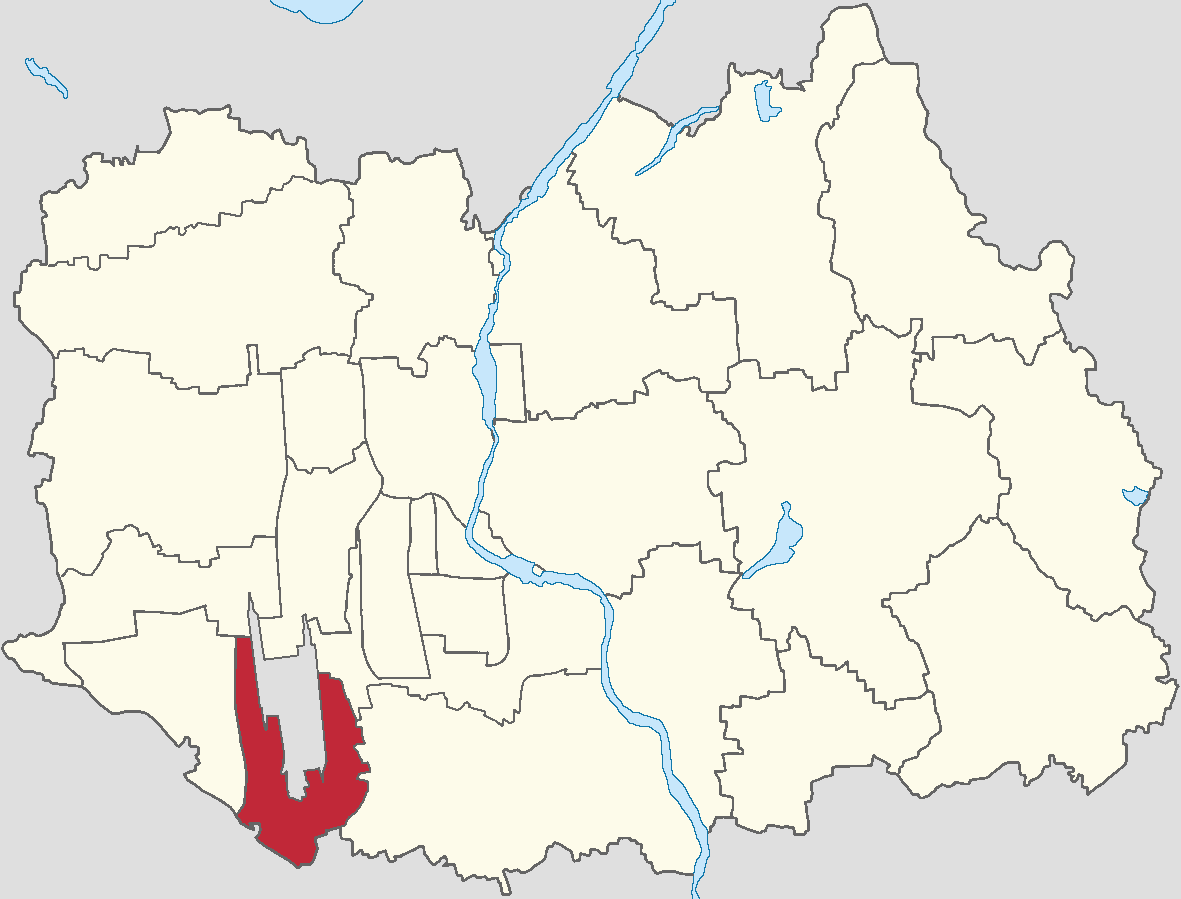
- Location of Tianzhu Town within Shunyi District

- Location within Beijing Location within China
- Coordinates: 40°03′59″N 116°34′04″E
- Country: China
- Municipality: Beijing
- District: Shunyi
- Village-level Divisions: 3 communities 8 villages

Area
  - Total: 24.04 km^{2} (9.28 sq mi)
- Elevation: 30 m (98 ft)

Population (2020)
  - Total: 32,979
  - Density: 1,372/km^{2} (3,553/sq mi)
- Time zone: UTC+8 (China Standard)
- Postal code: 101312
- Area code: 010

Tianzhu Town (Chinese: 天竺镇; pinyin: Tiānzhú Zhèn) is a town on the southwestern corner of Shunyi District, Beijing, China. It is located at the south of Nanfaxin and Houshayu Towns, west of Renhe and Liqiao Towns, north of Jinzhan and Sunhe Townships, east of Konggang Subdistrict, and surrounds Capital Airport Subdistrict on three sides. It had 32,979 residents according to the 2020 census.

The area's name is a corruption of Tianzhuzhuang (simplified Chinese: 天竹庄; traditional Chinese: 天竹莊; lit. 'Heavenly Bamboo Manor'), an imperial garden during the Liao dynasty.

== History ==
Timetable of Tianzhu Town
Time	Status	Belonged to
Ming dynasty	Part of Shunzhou	Shunyi County
1719–1941	Tianzhu Village (Incorporated Longshan and Taoshan in 1908)	Daxing County
1941–1956	Tianzhu Village (Incorporated Longshan and Taoshan in 1908)	Shunyi County
1956–1963	Tianzhu Township	Shunyi County
1963–1983	Tianzhu People's Commune	Shunyi County
1983–1989	Tianzhu Township	Shunyi County
1989–1998	Tianzhu Town	Shunyi County
1998–2000	Tianzhu Area	Shunyi District
2000–present	Tianzhu Area (Tianzhu Town)	Shunyi District

== Administrative divisions ==
As of 2021, Tianzhu Area was composed of 11 subdivisions, which can be further classified into 3 communities and 8 villages:

Administrative division code	Subdivision names	Name transliteration	Type
110113005003	希望花园	Xiwang Huayuan	Community
110113005006	南竺园一区	Nanzhuyuan Yiqu	Community
110113005007	蓝天	Lantian	Community
110113005201	天竺	Tianzhu	Village
110113005203	楼台	Loutai	Village
110113005204	岗山	Lanshan	Village
110113005205	龙山	Longshan	Village
110113005206	桃山	Taoshan	Village
110113005207	杨二营	Yang'erying	Village
110113005209	二十里堡	Ershilibao	Village
110113005210	小王辛庄	Xiao Wangxinzhuang	Village

== See also ==
- List of township-level divisions of Beijing
