= Hualikan station =

Beijing Subway station

Hualikan 花梨坎
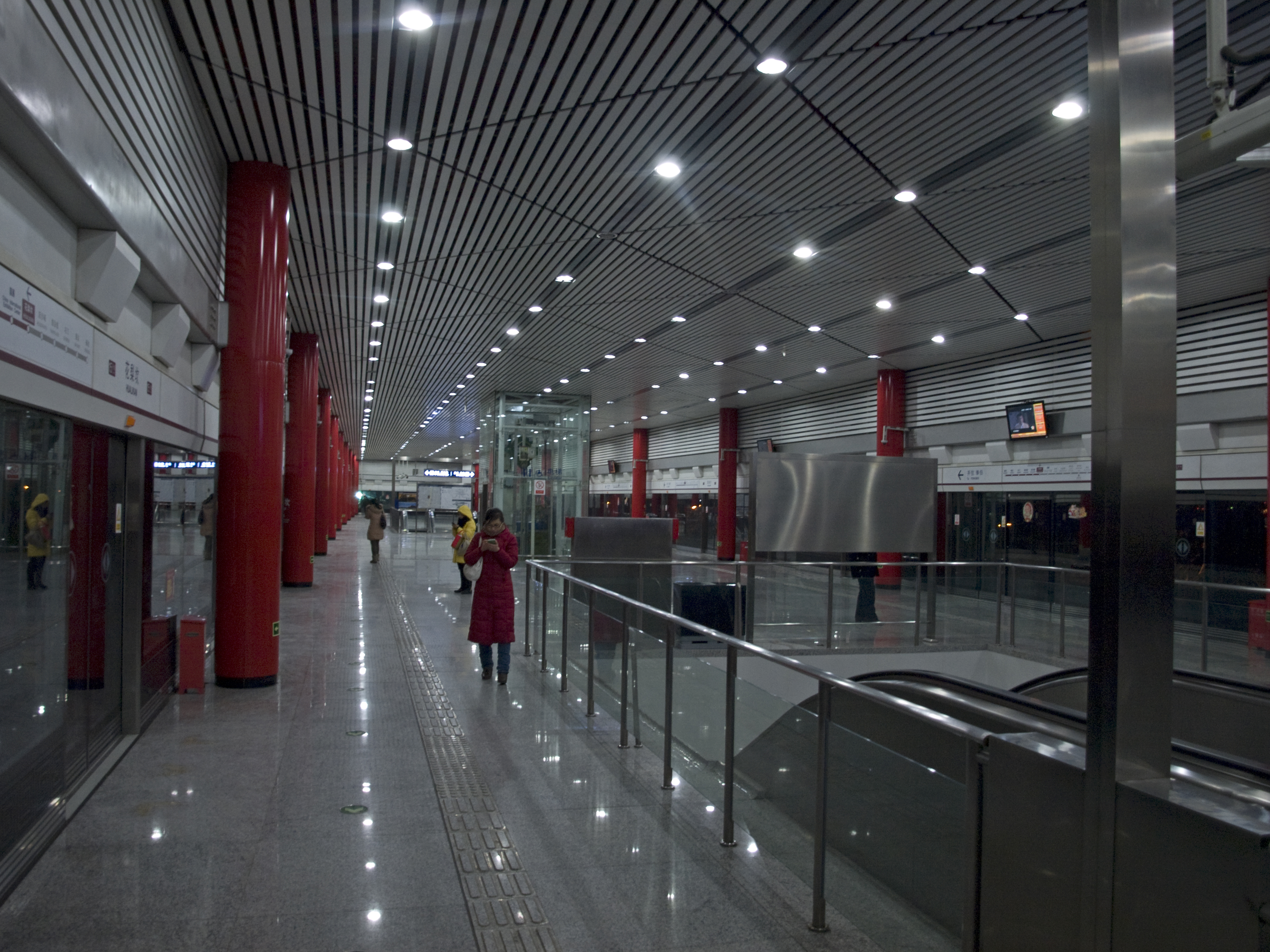
- Platform

General information
- Location: National Highway 101 (Jingmi Road) and Anning Street (安宁大街); Konggang Subdistrict,Shunyi District, Beijing; China
- Coordinates: 40°05′04″N 116°33′27″E
- Operator: Beijing Mass Transit Railway Operation Corporation Limited
- Line: Line 15
- Platforms: 2 (1 island platform)
- Tracks: 2

Construction
- Structure type: Elevated
- Accessible: Yes

History
- Opened: December 30, 2010; 15 years ago

Services
Preceding station	Beijing Subway	Following station
China Int'l Exhibition Center towards Qinghua Donglu Xikou	Line 15	Houshayu towards Fengbo
Location
- Location within Beijing

Hualikan station (Chinese: 花梨坎站; pinyin: Huālíkǎn Zhàn) is a station on Line 15 of the Beijing Subway.

== Station layout ==
The station has an elevated island platform. There are 4 exits, lettered A, B, C, and D.

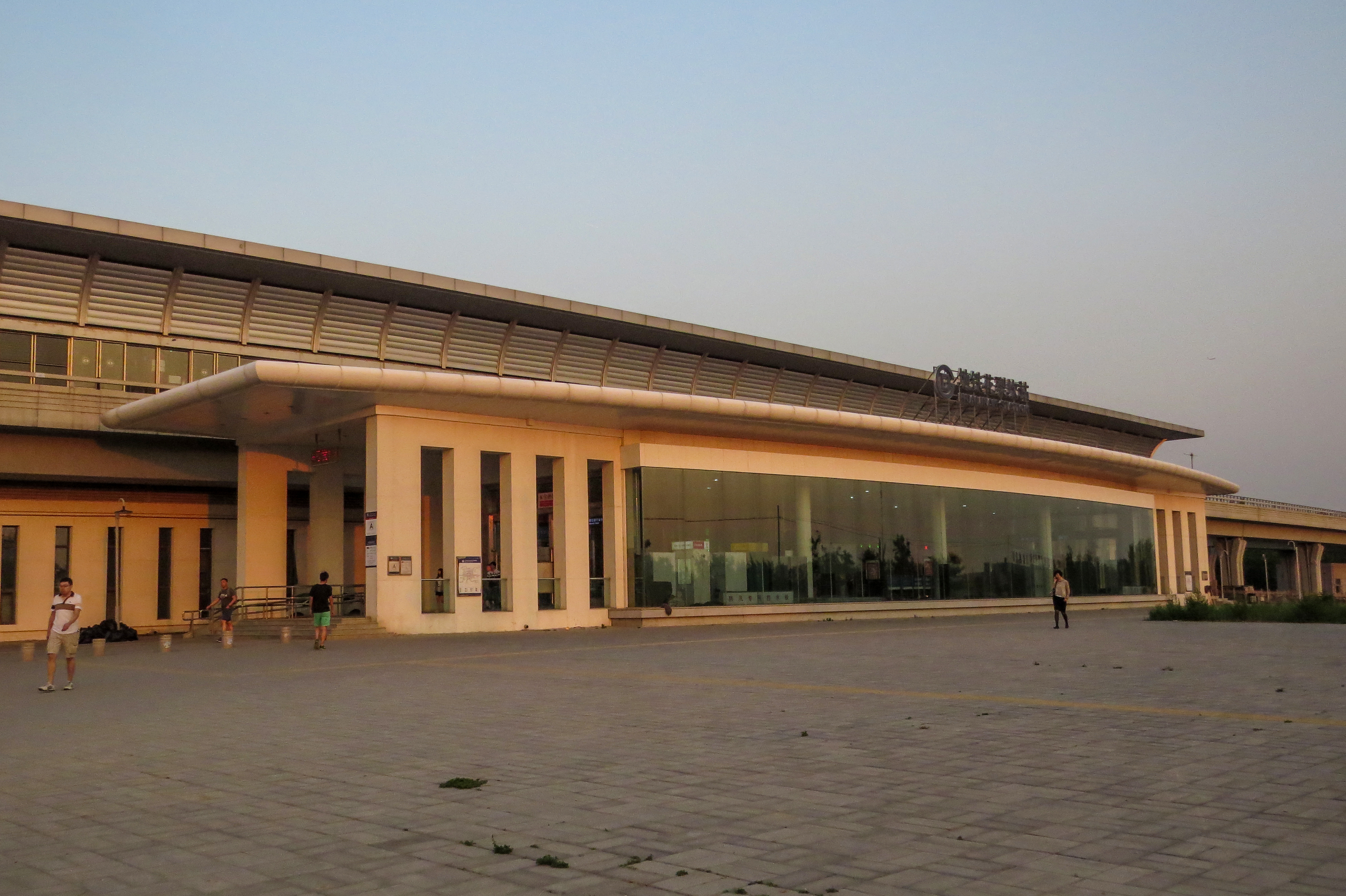
Hualikan station from the outside
