= Houshayu station =

Beijing Subway station

Houshayu 后沙峪
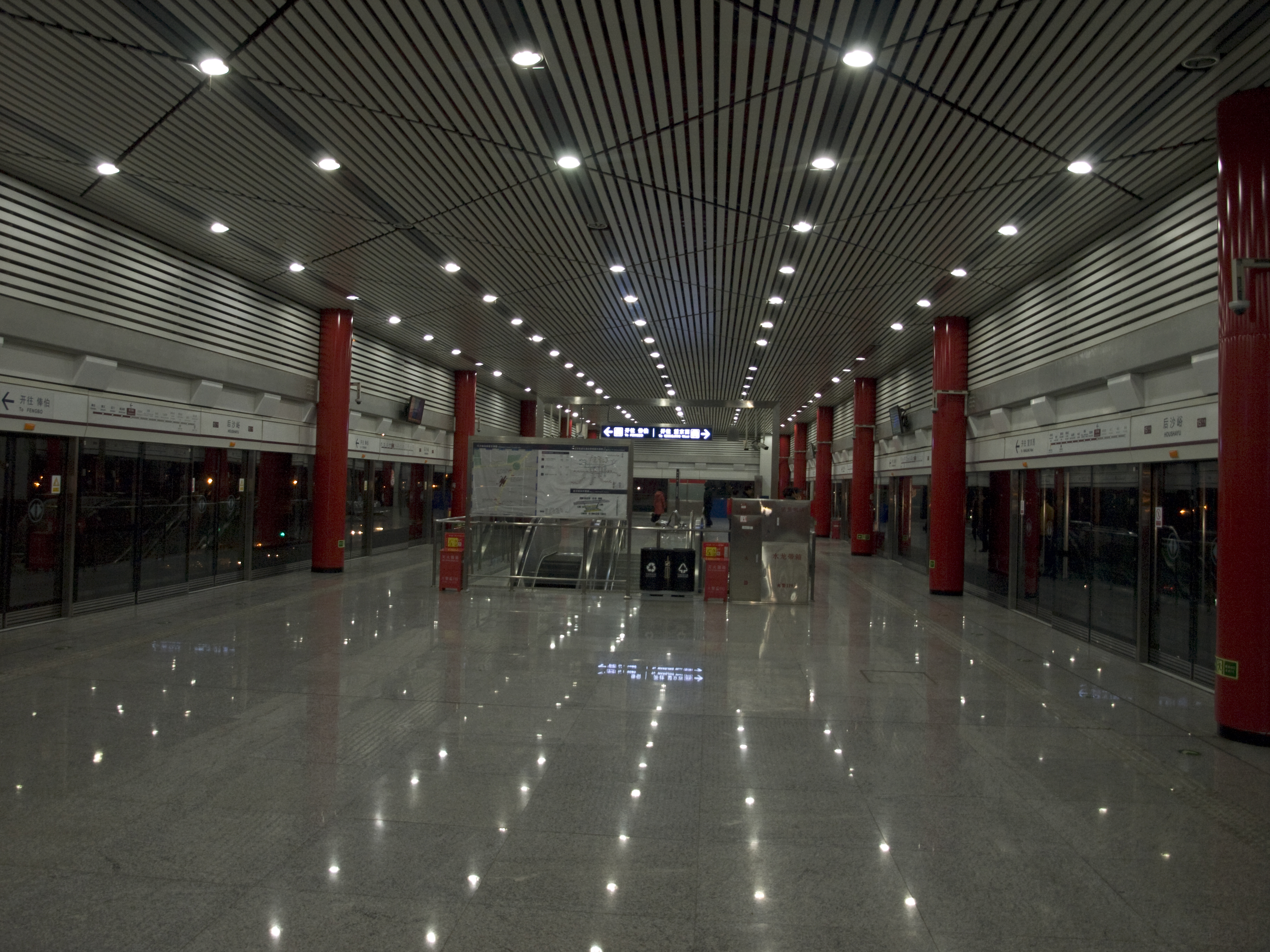
- Platform

General information
- Location: National Highway 101 (Jingmi Road) southwest of traffic circle with Shunping Road (顺平路); Houshayu, Shunyi District, Beijing; China
- Coordinates: 40°06′51″N 116°33′51″E
- Operator: Beijing Mass Transit Railway Operation Corporation Limited
- Line: Line 15
- Platforms: 2 (1 island platform)
- Tracks: 2

Construction
- Structure type: Elevated
- Accessible: Yes

History
- Opened: December 30, 2010; 15 years ago

Services
Preceding station	Beijing Subway	Following station
Hualikan towards Qinghua Donglu Xikou	Line 15	Nanfaxin towards Fengbo
Wangjing Dong (E) towards Qinghua Donglu Xikou	Line 15 Red service pattern	Nanfaxin towards Fengbo
Hualikan towards Qinghua Donglu Xikou	Line 15 Green service pattern	Fengbo Terminus
Location
- Location within Beijing

Houshayu station (simplified Chinese: 后沙峪站; traditional Chinese: 後沙峪站; pinyin: Hòushāyù Zhàn) is a station on Line 15 of the Beijing Subway. The station was the eastern terminus of Line 15 until it was extended eastward to Fengbo on December 31, 2011. It also formerly served as a terminus for weekday rush hour services to Datunludong station until its discontinuation on July 23, 2025.

== Station layout ==
The station has an elevated island platform.

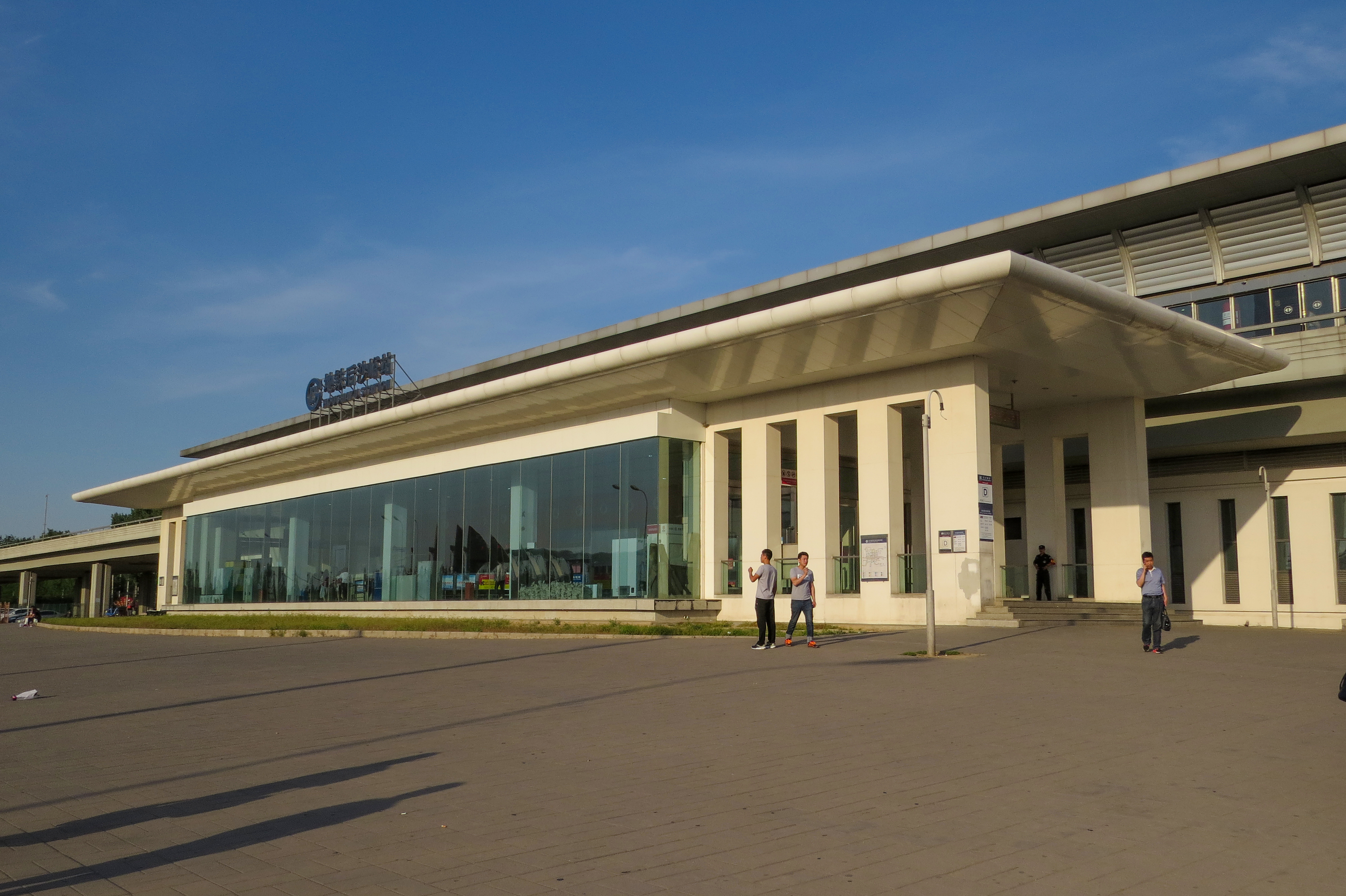
Houshayu station from the outside

== Exits ==
There are 4 exits, lettered A, B, C, and D. Exits A and B are accessible.
