= Houshayu, Beijing =

Town located in Beijing, China

Houshayu Town 后沙峪镇
- Town
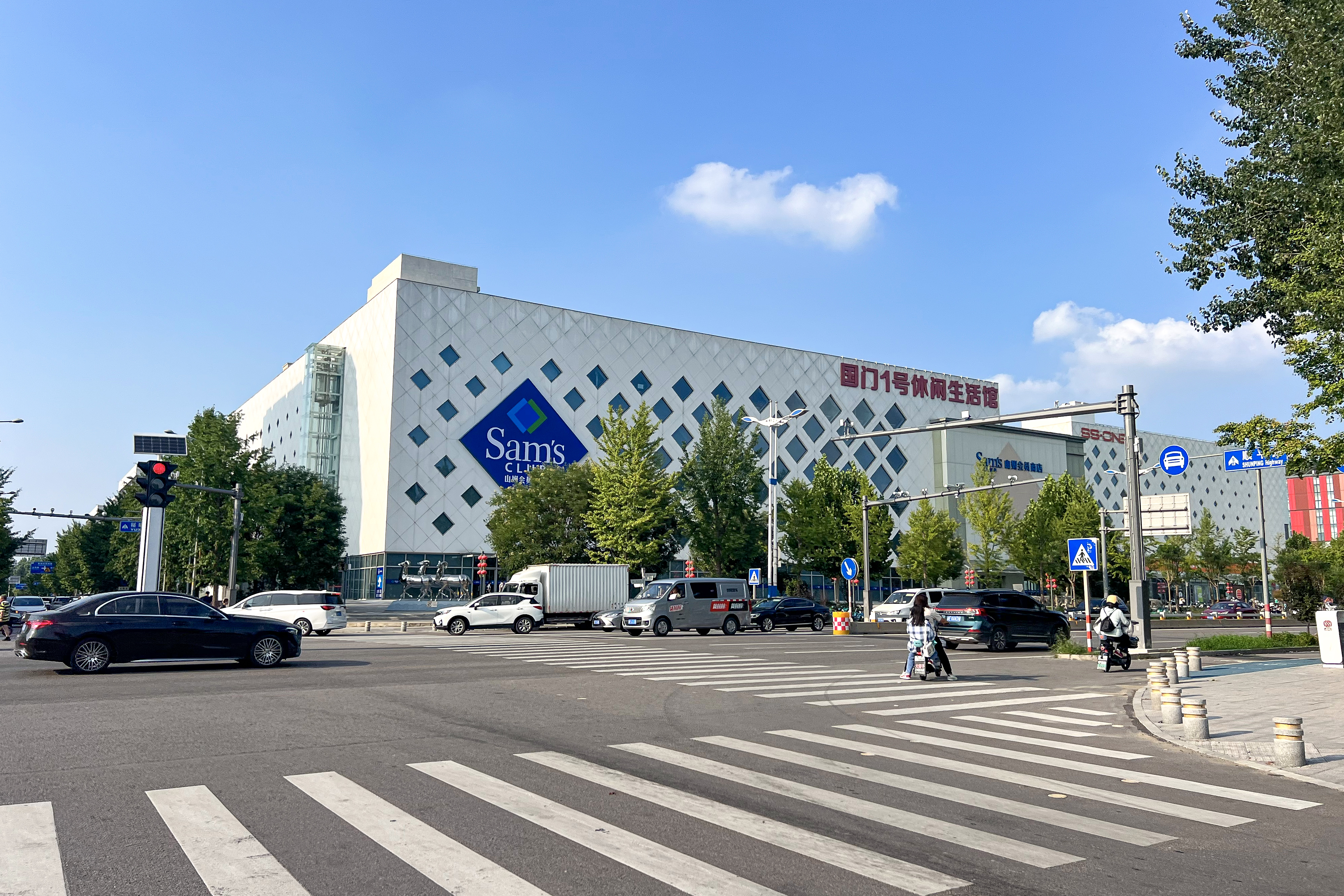
- Sam's Club Beijing Houshayu store

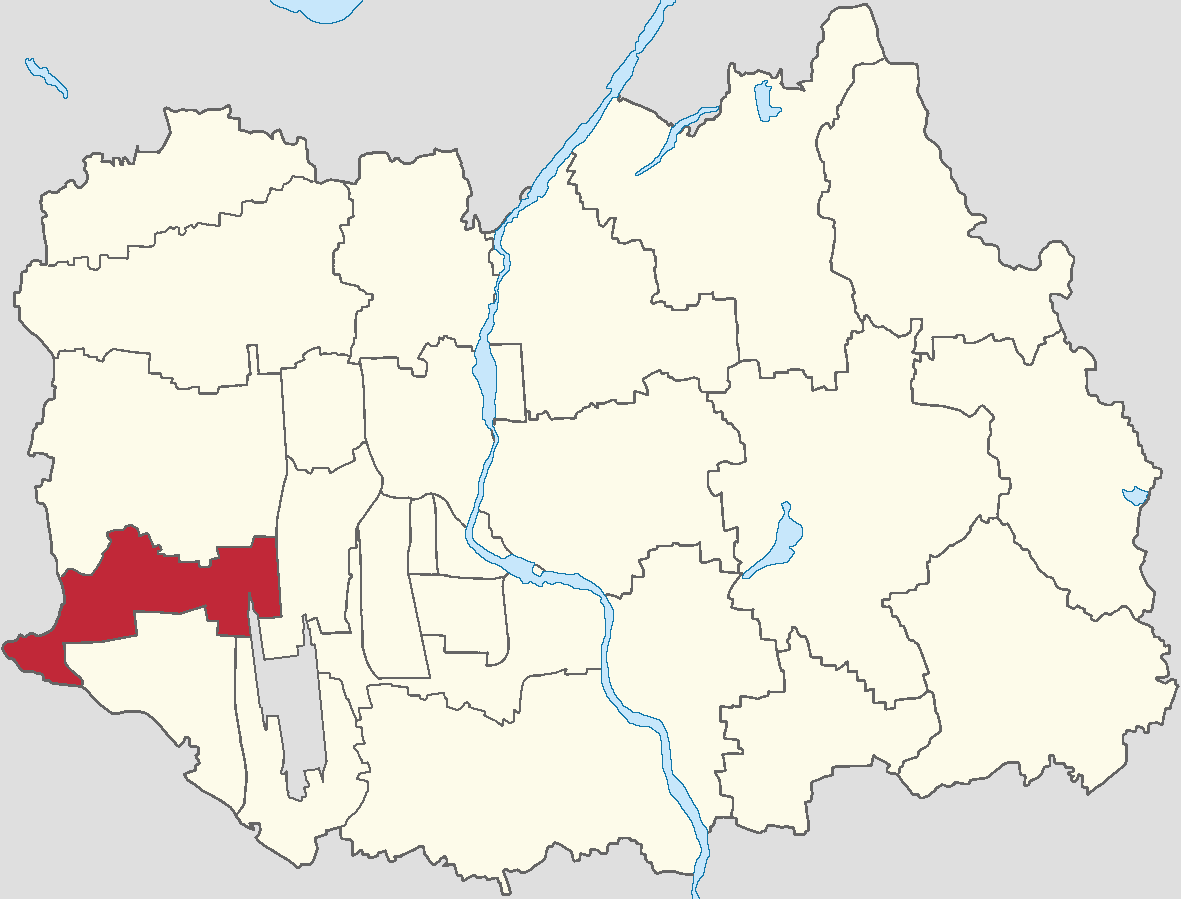
- Location of Houshayu Town within Shunyi District

- Location within Beijing Location within China
- Coordinates: 40°06′14″N 116°32′18″E
- Country: China
- Municipality: Beijing
- District: Shunyi
- Village-level Divisions: 6 communities 10 villages

Area
  - Total: 28.1 km^{2} (10.8 sq mi)
- Elevation: 36 m (118 ft)

Population (2020)
  - Total: 74,841
  - Density: 2,660/km^{2} (6,900/sq mi)
- Time zone: UTC+8 (China Standard)
- Postal code: 101318
- Area code: 010

Houshayu Town (Chinese: 后沙峪镇; pinyin: Hòushāyù Zhèn) is a town located on the western side of Shunyi District, Beijing, China. It shares border with Gaoliying Town in the north, Nanfaxin Town and Capital Airport Subdistrict in the east, Konggang Subdistrict in the south, and Beiqijia Town in the west. It had a population of 74,841 as of 2020.

The town's name originated in the Yuan dynasty. At the time the settlement in this region was called Shayu (Chinese: 沙峪; lit. 'Sand Ravine') for its concaved landscape and being covered in sands. It was split into two villages in the Ming dynasty, and Houshayu became the predecessor of the town today.

== History ==
Timeline of changes in the status of Houshayu Town
Year	Status	Belonged
1950–1956	1st District	Shunyi County
1956–1958	Houshayu Township Huiminying Township	Shunyi County
1958–1960	Part of Zhangxizhuang People's Commune	Shunyi County
1960–1962	Part of Zhangxizhuang People's Commune	Chaoyang District
1962–1966	Houshayu People's Commune	Shunyi County
1966–1976	Part of Tianzhu People's Commune	Shunyi County
1976–1983	Houshayu People's Commune	Shunyi County
1983–1994	Houshayu Township	Shunyi County
1994–1998	Houshayu Town	Shunyi County
1998–2000	Houshayu Area	Shunyi District
2000–present	Houshayu Area (Houshayu Town)	Shunyi District

== Administrative divisions ==
As of 2021, Houshayu Area was composed of 16 subdivisions, in which 6 were communities and 10 were villages:

Administrative division code	Subdivision names	Name transliteration	Type
110113004002	双裕西区	Shuangyu Xiqu	Community
110113004003	香花畦	Xianghuaqi	Community
110113004004	江山赋	Jiangshanfu	Community
110113004005	双裕东区	Shuangyu Dongqu	Community
110113004006	蓝尚家园	Lanshang Jiayuan	Community
110113004008	金成裕雅苑	Jinchengyu Yayuan	Community
110113004201	西泗上	Xisishang	Village
110113004202	古城	Gucheng	Village
110113004203	罗各庄	Luogezhuang	Village
110113004208	马头庄	Matouzhuang	Village
110113004209	后沙峪	Houshayu	Village
110113004212	火神营	Huoshenying	Village
110113004213	铁匠营	Tiejiangying	Village
110113004214	枯柳树	Kuliushu	Village
110113004215	回民营	Huiminying	Village
110113004216	董各庄	Donggezhuang	Village

== Gallery ==
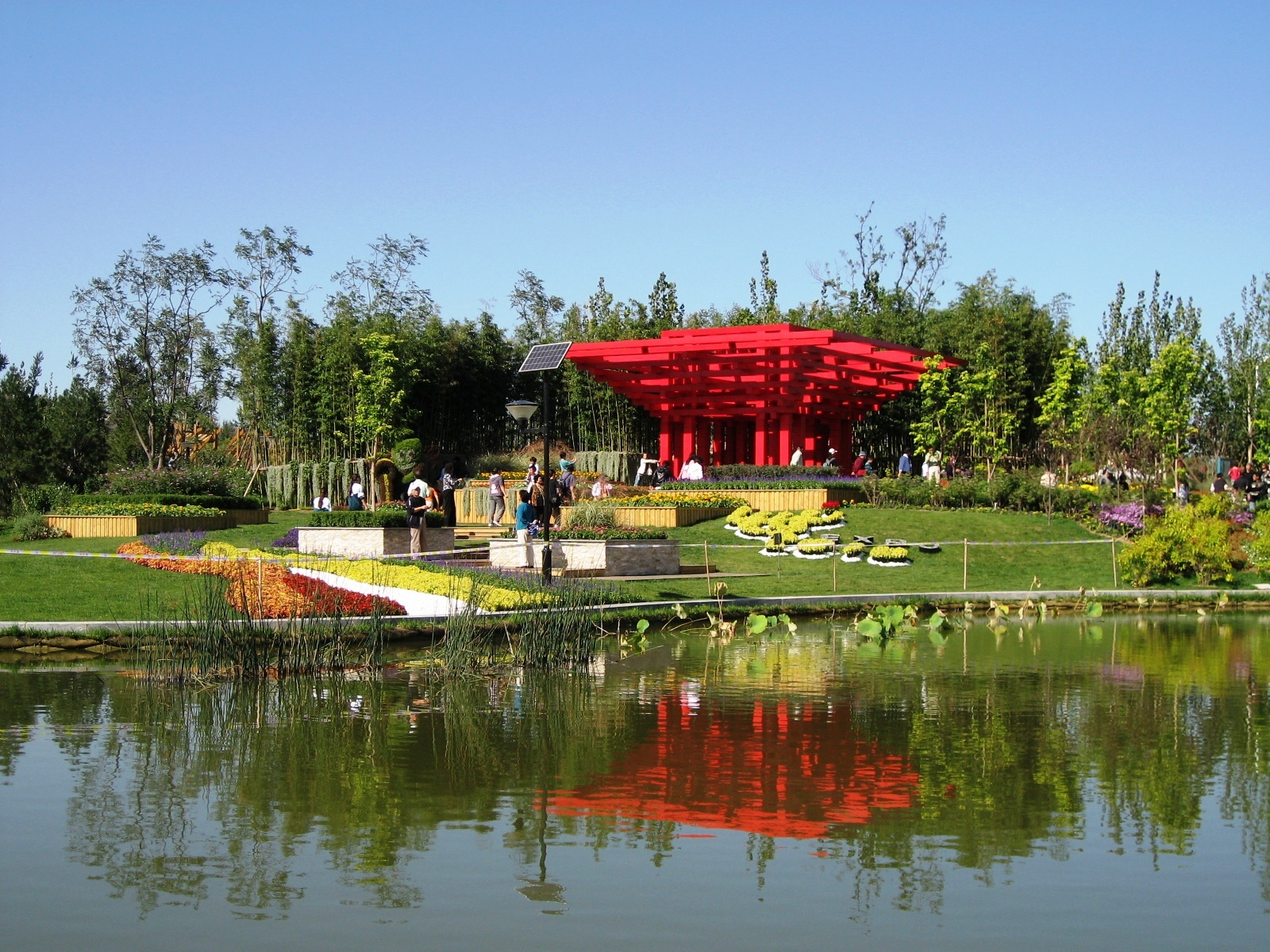
The 7th Shunyi Flower Exhibition, 2009

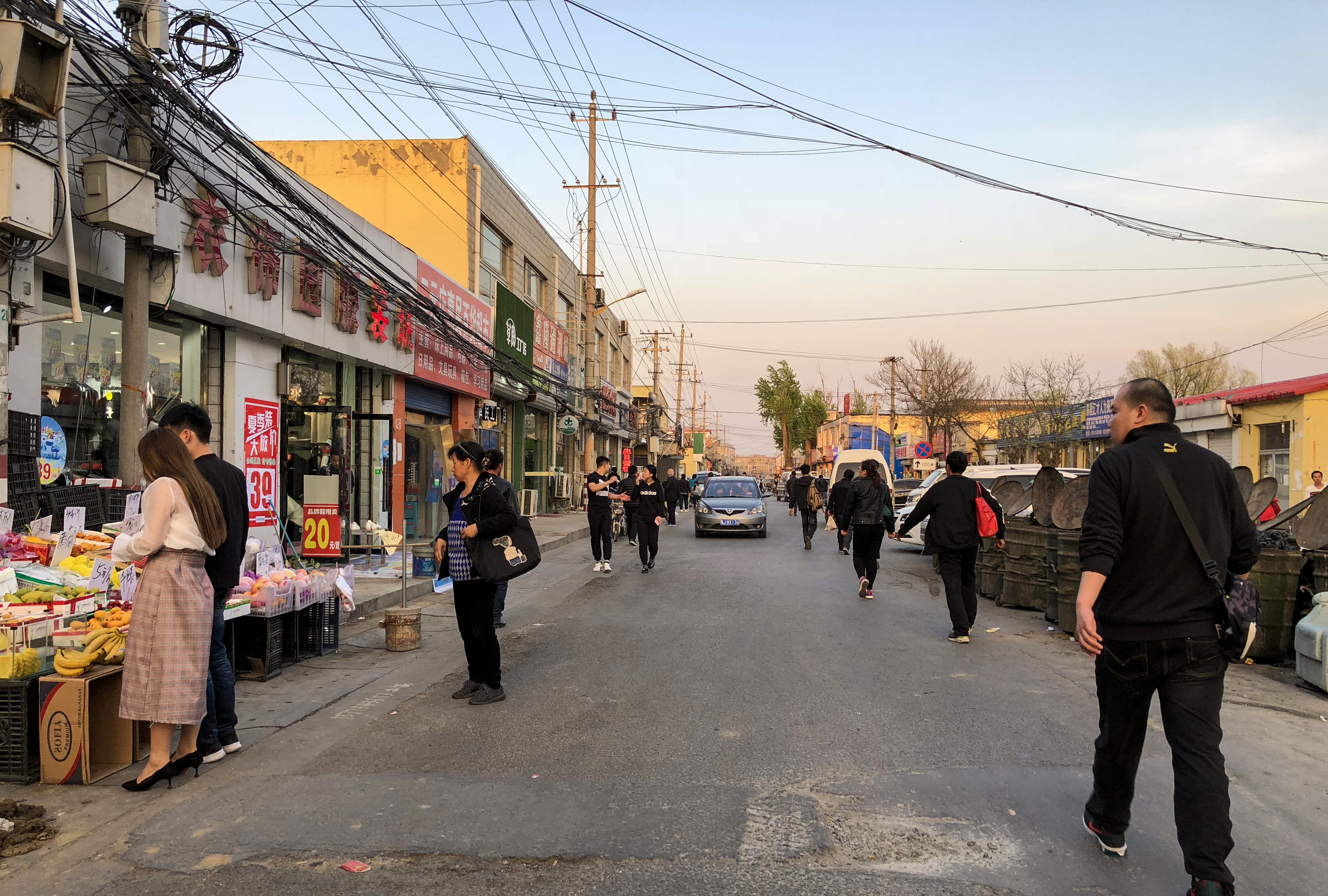
Main street of Tiejiangying Village, 2018

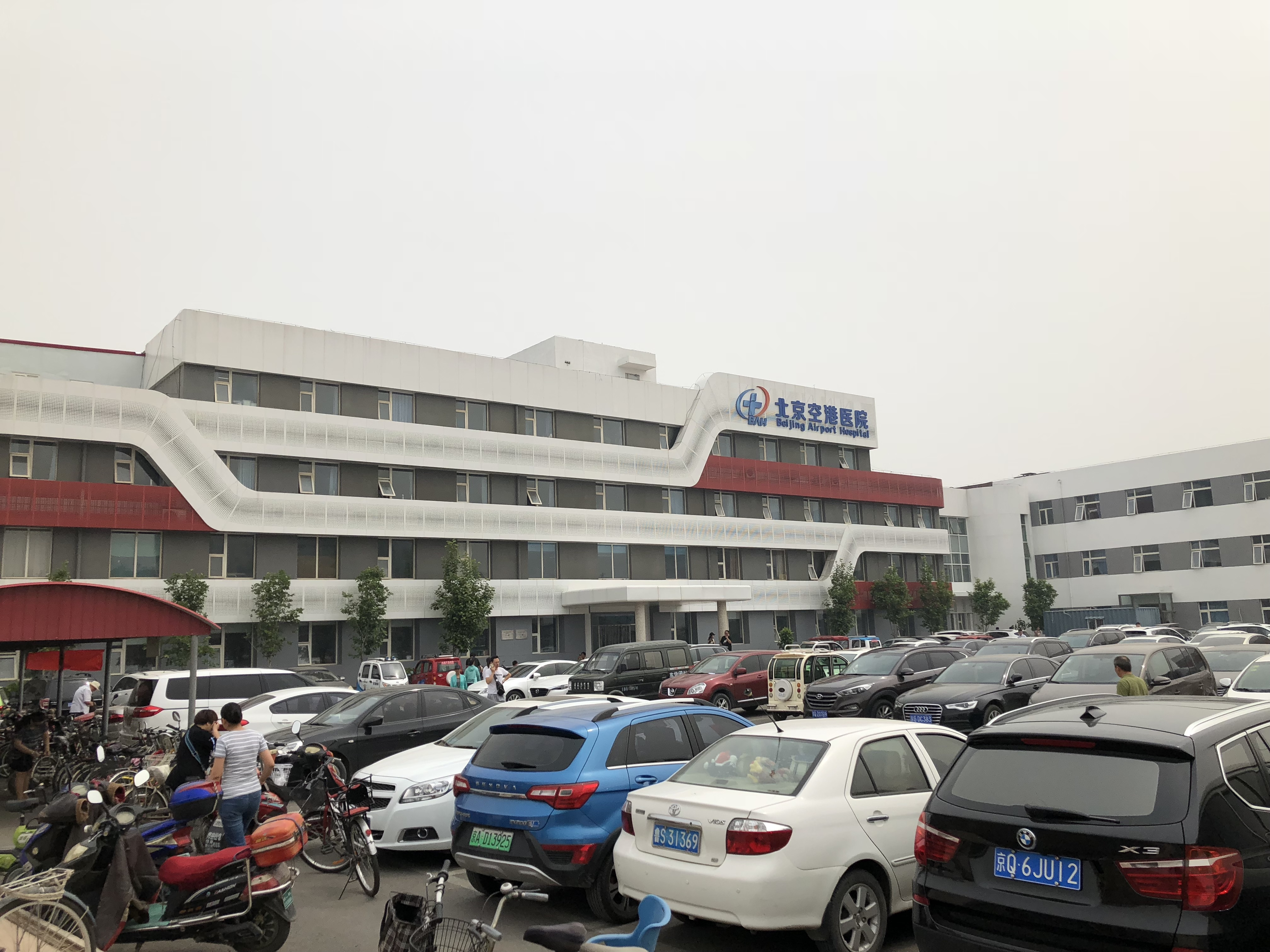
Parking section of Konggang Hospital, 2018

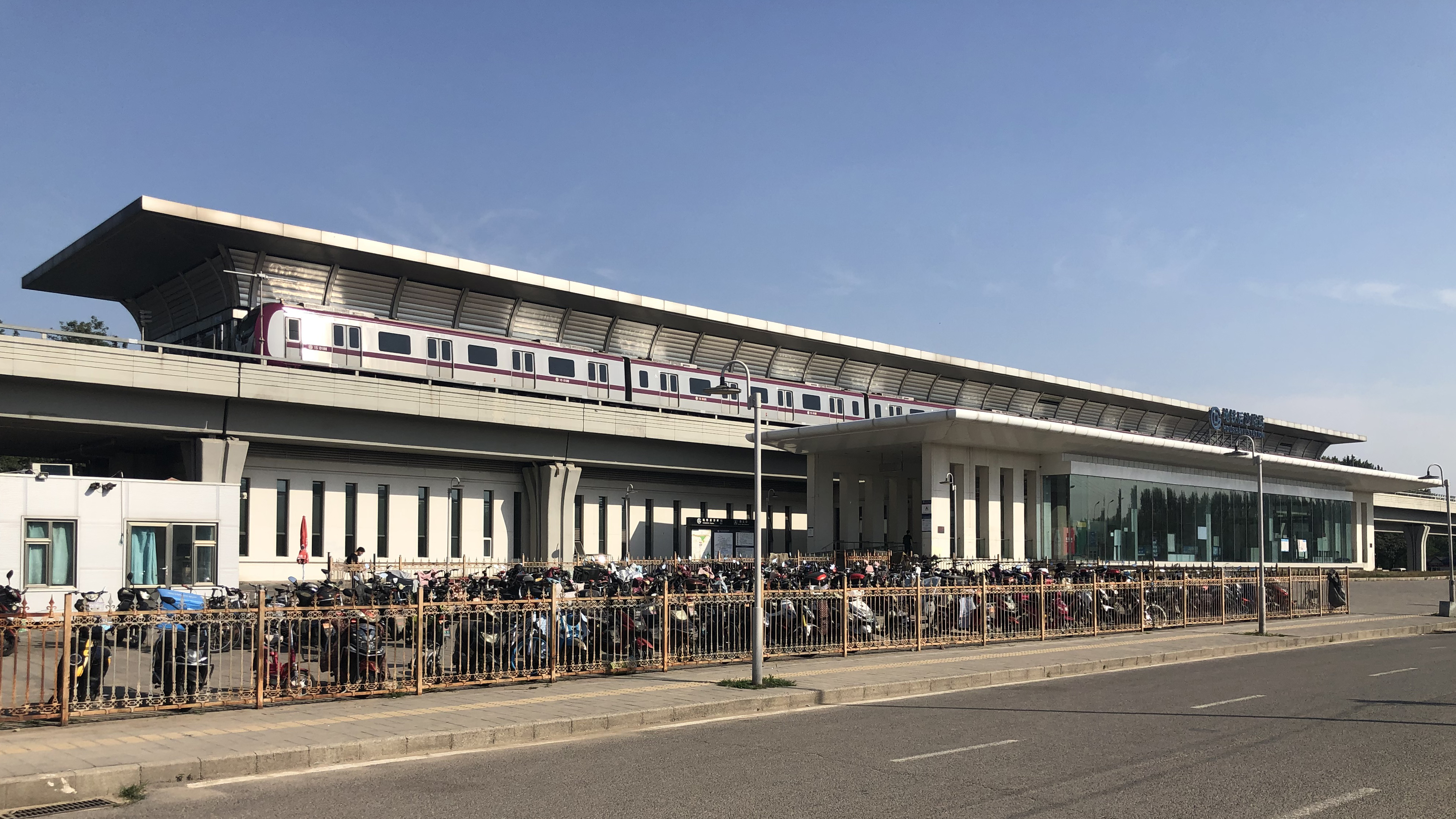
Houshayu Station of Beijing Subway, 2020

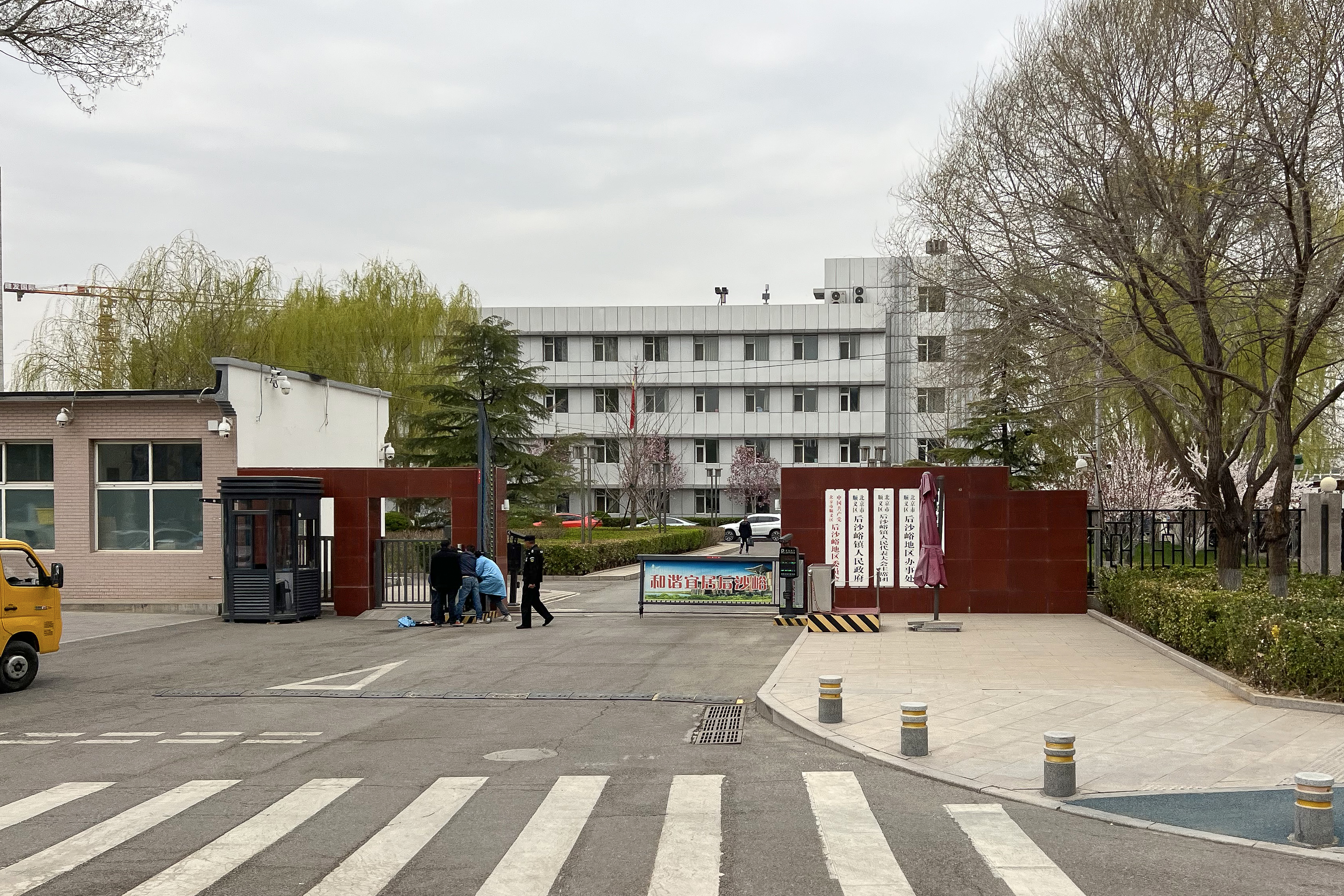
Building of government of Houshayu Town 2024

== See also ==
- List of township-level divisions of Beijing
