= Renhe, Beijing =

Renhe Town 仁和镇
- Town
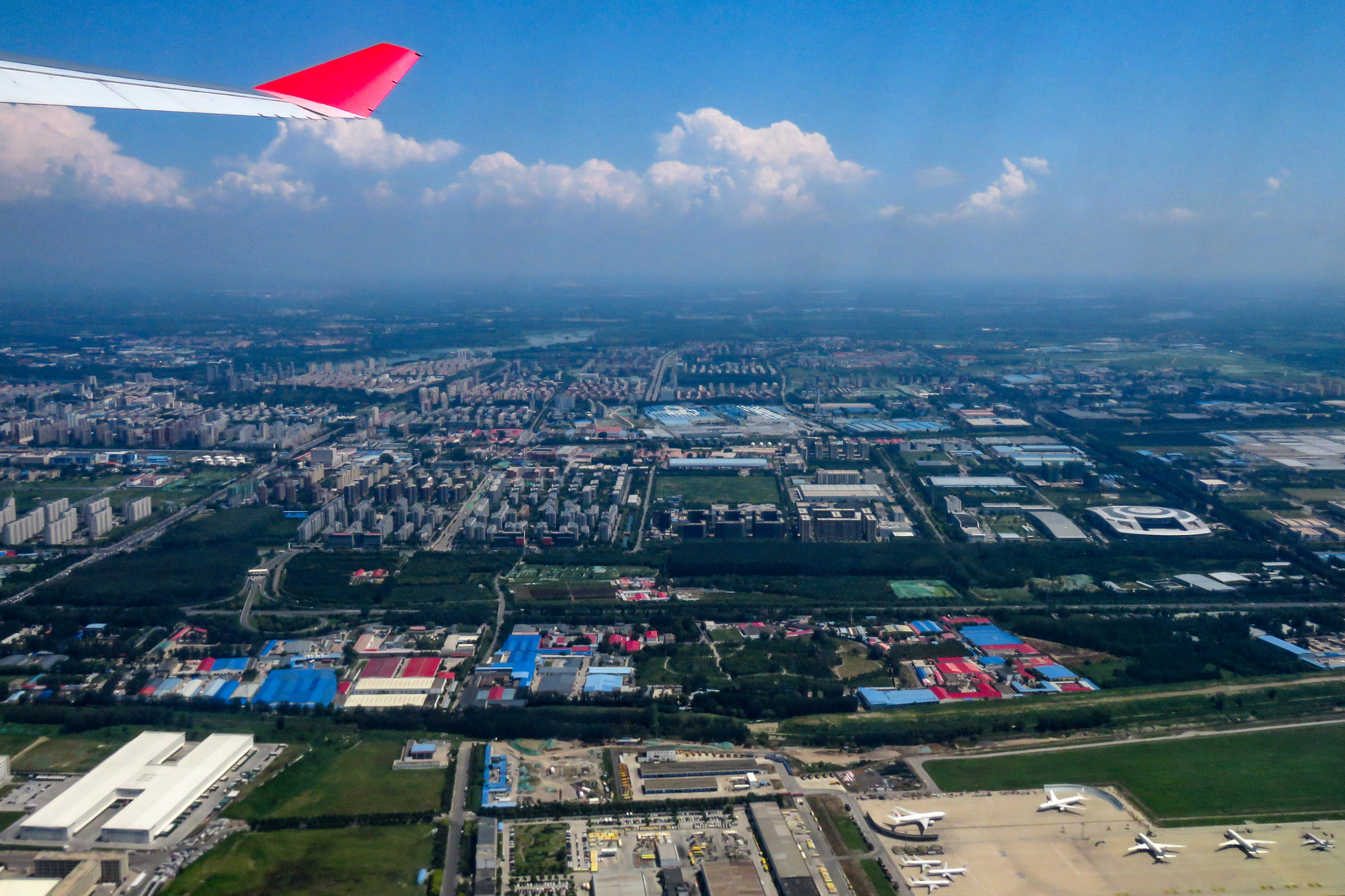
- Aerial view of Renhe Town, 2018

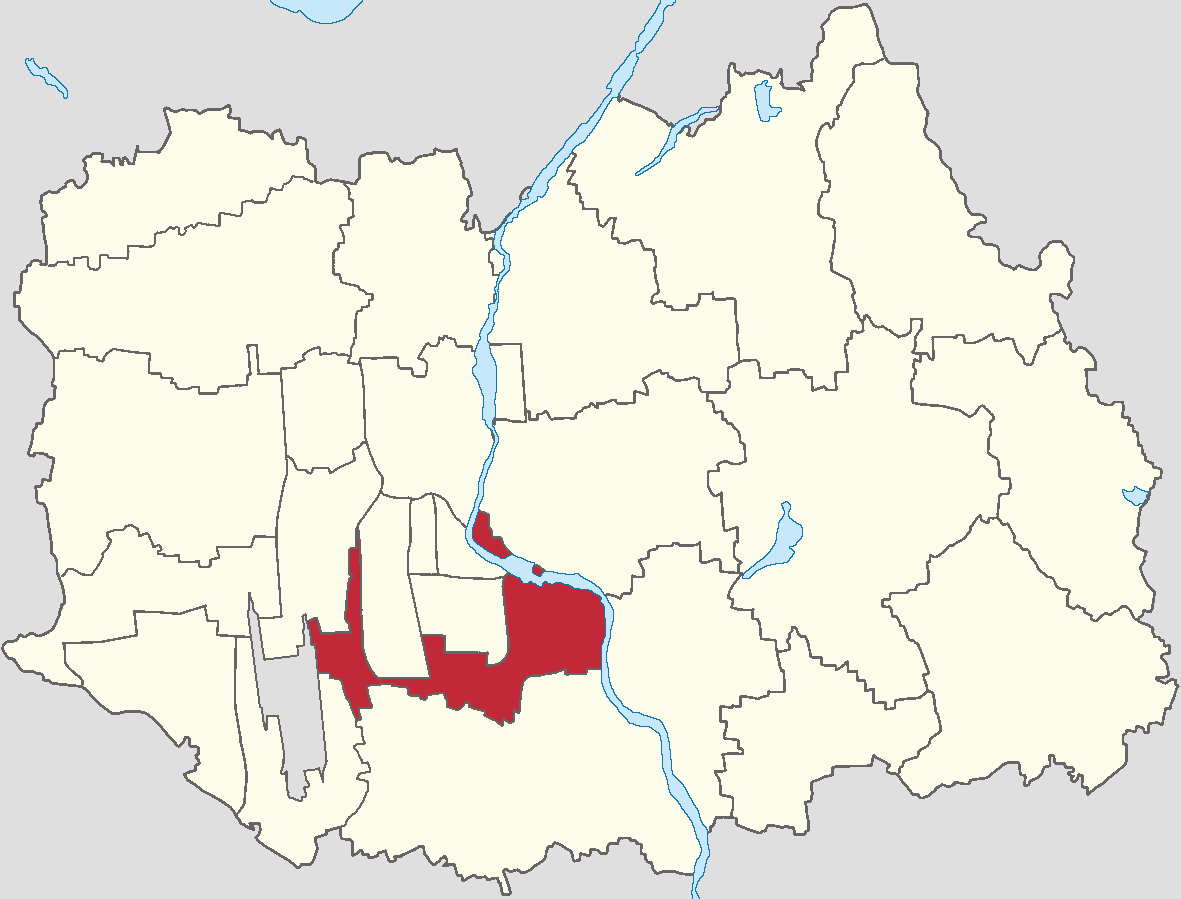
- Location of Renhe Town within Shunyi District

- Location within Beijing Location within China
- Coordinates: 40°07′02″N 116°38′51″E
- Country: China
- Municipality: Beijing
- District: Shunyi
- Village-level Divisions: 3 communities 14 villages

Area
  - Total: 38.38 km^{2} (14.82 sq mi)
- Elevation: 34 m (112 ft)

Population (2020)
  - Total: 67,391
  - Density: 1,756/km^{2} (4,548/sq mi)
- Time zone: UTC+8 (China Standard)
- Postal code: 101300
- Area code: 010

Renhe Town (Chinese: 仁和镇; pinyin: Rénhé Zhèn) is a town on the western side of Shunyi District, Beijing, China. It shares border with Shuangfeng Subdistrict and Nancai Town in the north, Lisui Town in the east, Liqiao Town in the south, and has a corridor between Wangquan Subdistrict and Liqiao Town that connects to land east of Capital Airport Subdistrict and Tianzhu Town. In the year 2020, it had a census population of 67,391.

== History ==
Timeline of Renhe Town
Year	Status	Within
1928–1949	Renhe Town	Shunyi County
1949–1958	Renhezhen District	Shunyi County
1958–1965	Chengguan People's Commune	Shunyi County
1965–1969	Chengguan Town	Shunyi County
1969–1980	Chengguan Subdistrict	Shunyi County
1980–1990	Chengguan Town	Shunyi County
1990–1998	Shunyi Town (Incorporated Pinggezhuang in 1990)	Shunyi County
1998–2000	Renhe Area	Shunyi District
2000–present	Renhe Area (Renhe Town)	Shunyi District

== Administrative divisions ==
In the year 2021, Renhe Area had 17 subdivisions, of which 3 were communities and 14 were villages:

Administrative division code	Subdivision names	Name transliteration	Type
110113003003	太阳城	Taiyangcheng	Community
110113003004	鼎顺嘉园	Dingshun Jiayuan	Community
110113003005	港馨家园东区	Gangxin Jiayuan Dongqu	Community
110113003201	石各庄	Shigezhuang	Village
110113003202	前进	Qianjin	Village
110113003203	复兴	Fuxing	Village
110113003204	太平	Taiping	Village
110113003211	沙坨	Shatuo	Village
110113003212	河南村	Henancun	Village
110113003213	胡各庄	Hugezhuang	Village
110113003216	塔河	Tahe	Village
110113003218	米各庄	Migezhuang	Village
110113003219	窑坡	Yaopo	Village
110113003220	陶家坟	Taojiafen	Village
110113003221	平各庄	Pinggezhuang	Village
110113003222	北兴	Beixing	Village
110113003224	临河	Linhe	Village

== See also ==
- List of township-level divisions of Beijing
