= Konggang Subdistrict =

Konggang Subdistrict 空港街道
- Subdistrict
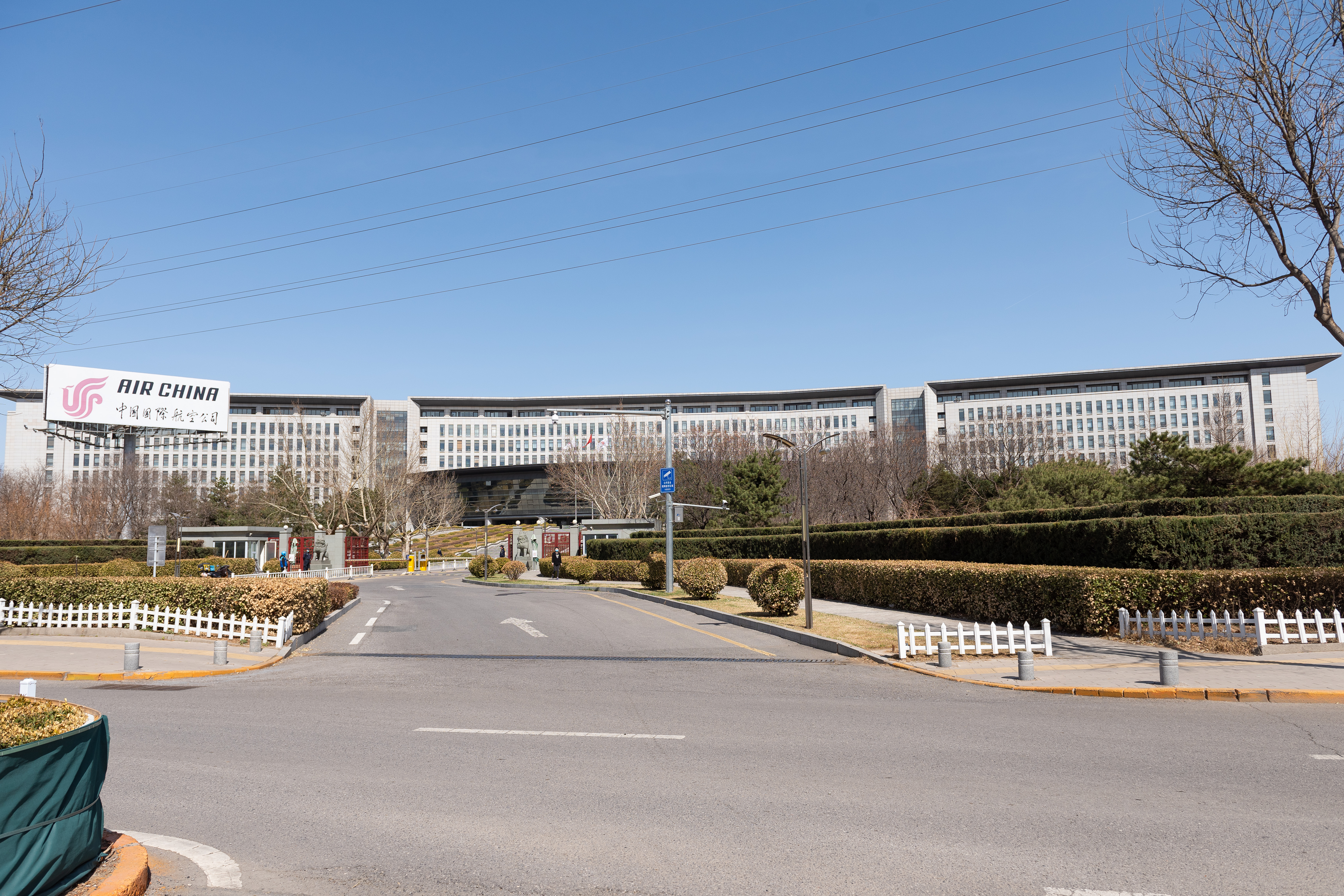
- Headquarter of Air China, 2021

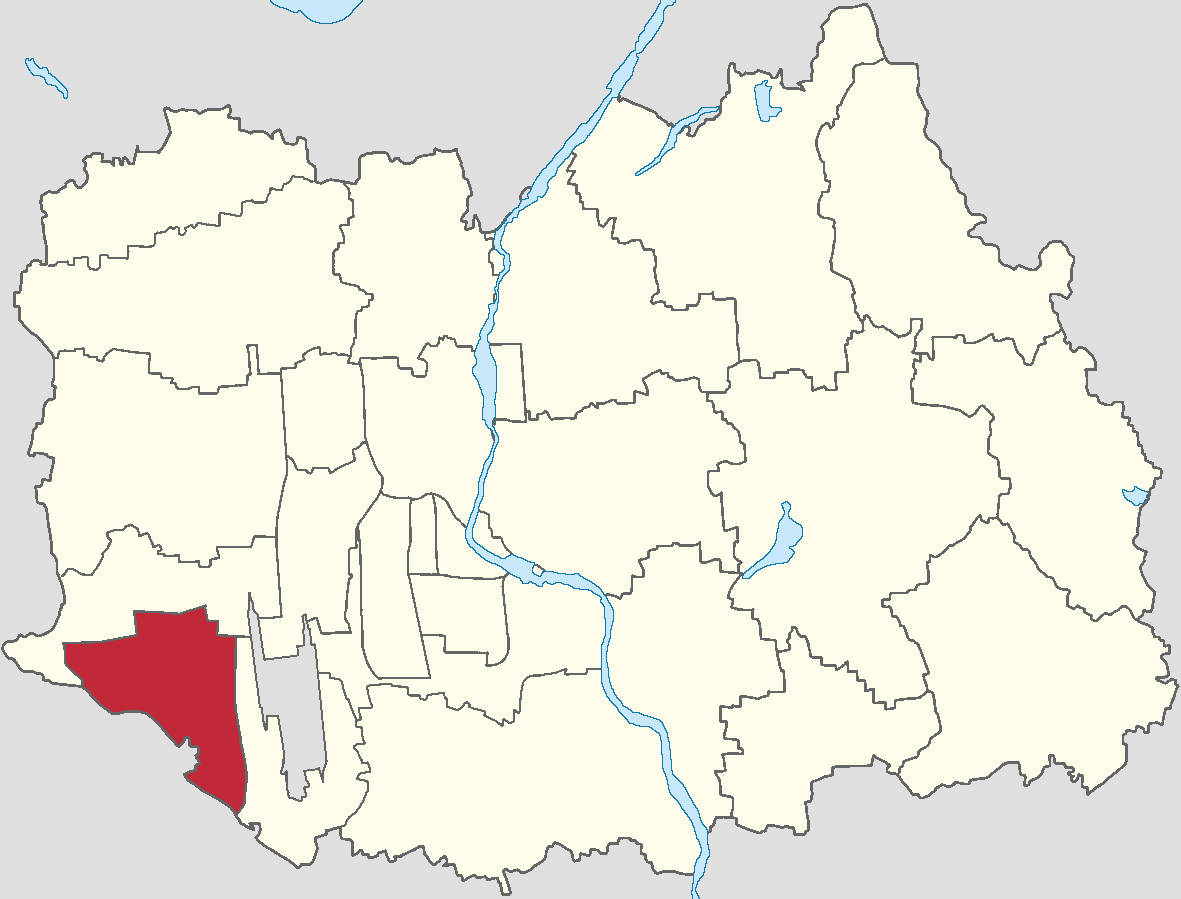
- Location of Konggang Subdistrict within Shunyi District

- Location within Beijing Location within China
- Coordinates: 40°06′03″N 116°32′45″E
- Country: China
- Municipality: Beijing
- District: Shunyi
- Village-level Divisions: 24 communities 8 villages

Area
  - Total: 26.37 km^{2} (10.18 sq mi)

Population (2020)
  - Total: 99,297
  - Density: 3,766/km^{2} (9,753/sq mi)
- Time zone: UTC+8 (China Standard)
- Postal code: 101318
- Area code: 010

Konggang Subdistrict (Chinese: 空港街道; pinyin: Kōnggǎng Jiēdào) is a subdistrict in the southwestern portion of Shunyi District, Beijing, China. It shares border with Houshayu Town in its north, Tianzhu Town in its east, and Sunhe Township in its southwest. As of 2020, it had a population of 99,297.

The subdistrict was created from parts of Tianzhu and Houshayu Towns in 2007.

== Administrative divisions ==
In 2021, Konggang Subdistrict consisted of 32 subdivisions, of which 24 were communities and 8 were villages:

Administrative division code	Subdivision names	Name transliteration	Type
110113011001	蓝星花园	Lanxing Huayuan	Community
110113011002	万科城市花园	Wanke Chengshi Huayuan	Community
110113011003	裕祥花园	Yuxiang Huayuan	Community
110113011004	三山新新家园	Sanshan Xinxin Jiayuan	Community
110113011005	天房第一	Tianfang Diyi	Community
110113011006	新国展国际	Xinguozhan Guoji	Community
110113011007	莲竹花园	Lianzhu Huayuan	Community
110113011008	莫奈花园	Monai Huayuan	Community
110113011009	吉祥花园	Jixiang Huayuan	Community
110113011010	翠竹新村第一	Cuizhu Xincun Diyi	Community
110113011011	翠竹新村第二	Cuizhu Xincun Di'er	Community
110113011012	双龙源	Shuanglongyuan	Community
110113011013	天竺新新家园	Tianzhu Xinxin Jiayuan	Community
110113011014	中粮祥云	Zhongliang Xiangyun	Community
110113011015	香蜜湾	Xiangmiwan	Community
110113011016	誉天下	Yutianxia	Community
110113011017	天竺花园	Tianzhu Huayuan	Community
110113011018	满庭芳	Mantingfang	Community
110113011019	嘉园	Jiayuan	Community
110113011020	首航	Shouhang	Community
110113011021	优山美地	Youshan Meidi	Community
110113011022	枫泉花园	Fengquan Huayuan	Community
110113011023	金港嘉园	Jingang Jiayuan	Community
110113011024	金地	Jindi	Community
110113011201	西白辛庄	Xi Baixinzhuang	Village
110113011202	燕王庄	Yanwangzhuang	Village
110113011203	西田各庄	Xi Tiangezhuang	Village
110113011204	东庄	Dongzhuang	Village
110113011205	花梨坎	Hualikan	Village
110113011206	薛大人庄	Xuedarenzhuang	Village
110113011207	前沙峪	Qianshayu	Village
110113011208	吉祥庄	Jixiangzhuang	Village

== Gallery ==
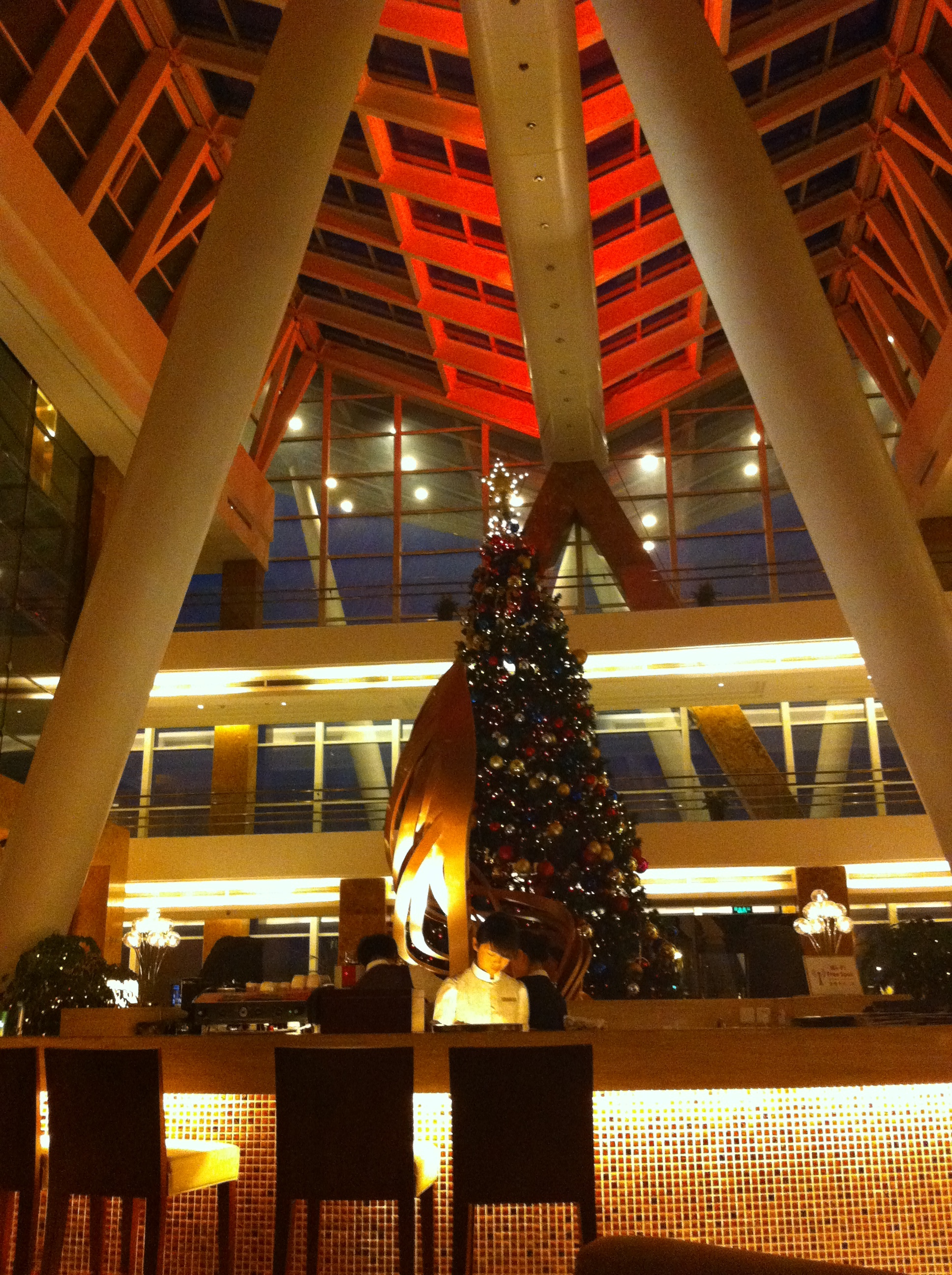
Holiday Inn Crown Plaza Airport, 2010

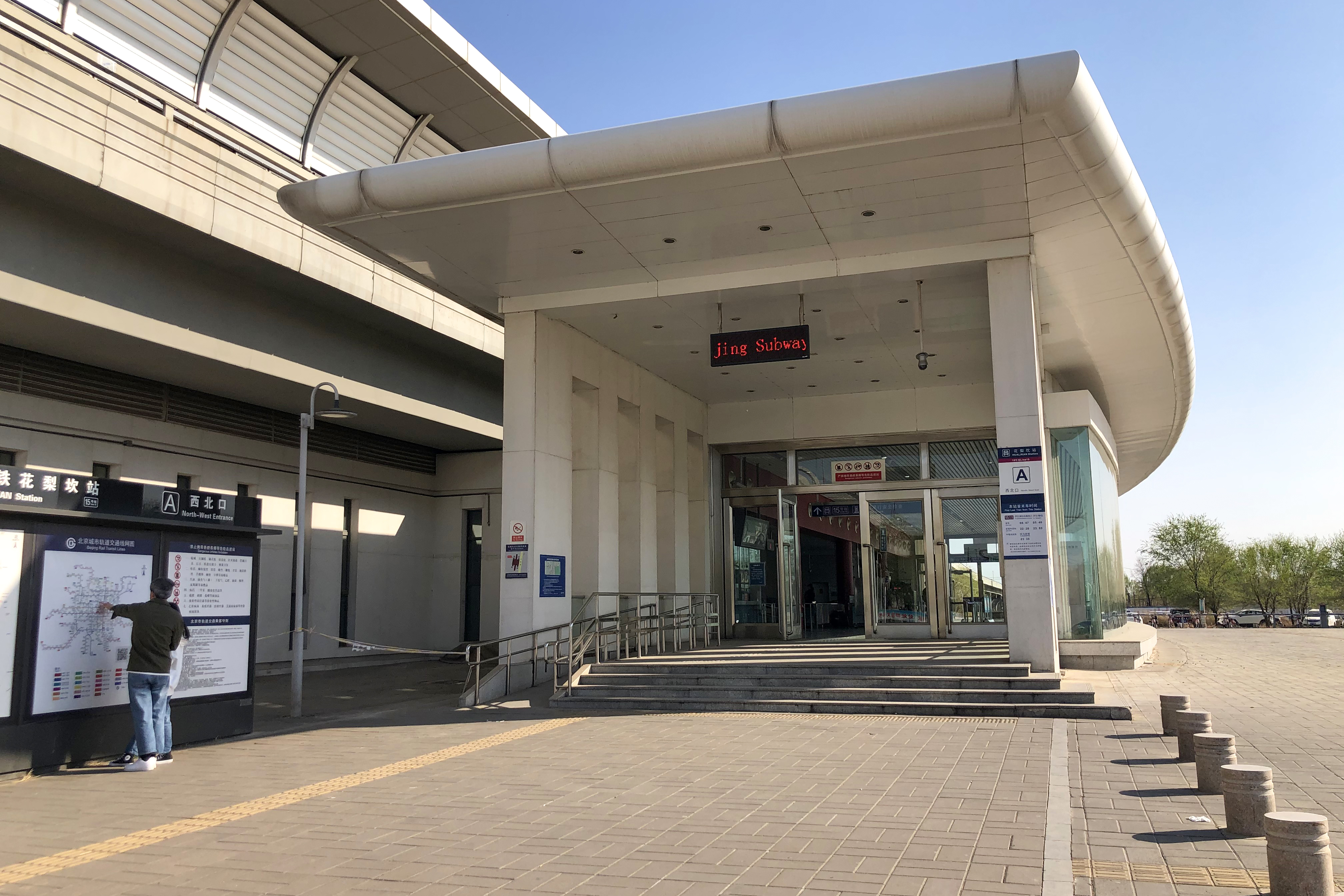
Hualikan Station, 2021

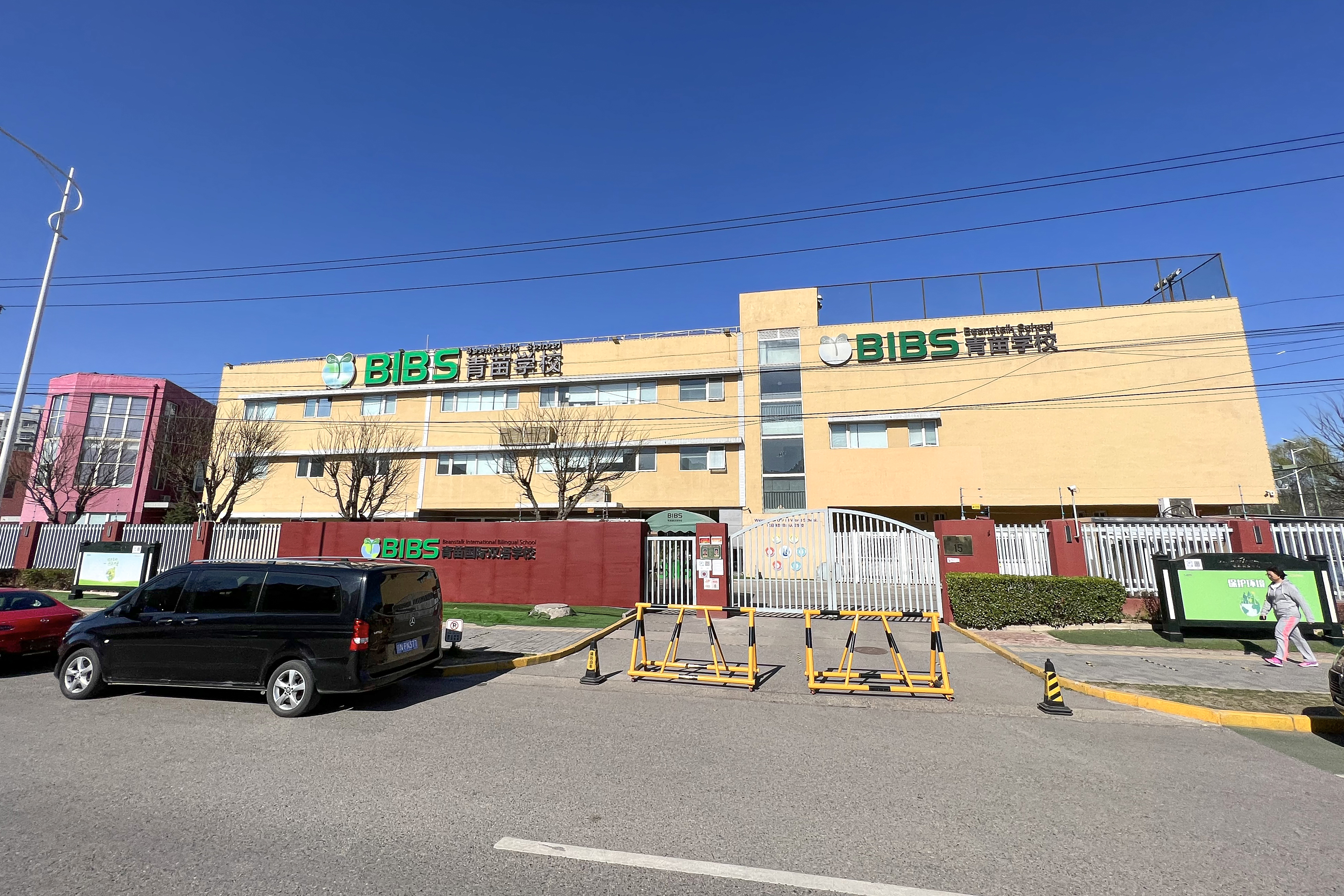
Beanstalk International Bilingual School Tianzhu Campus, 2022

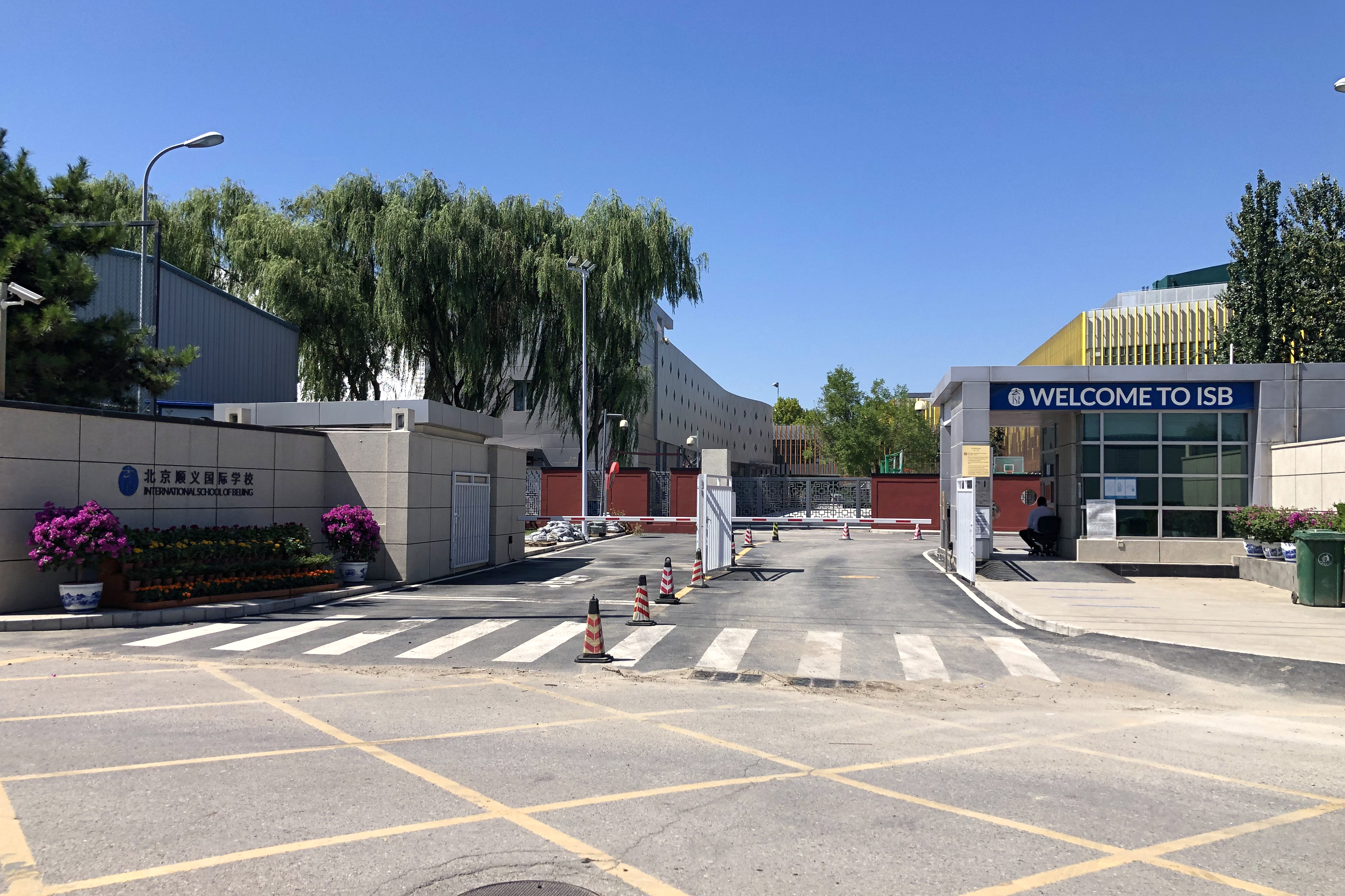
International School of Beijing, 2022

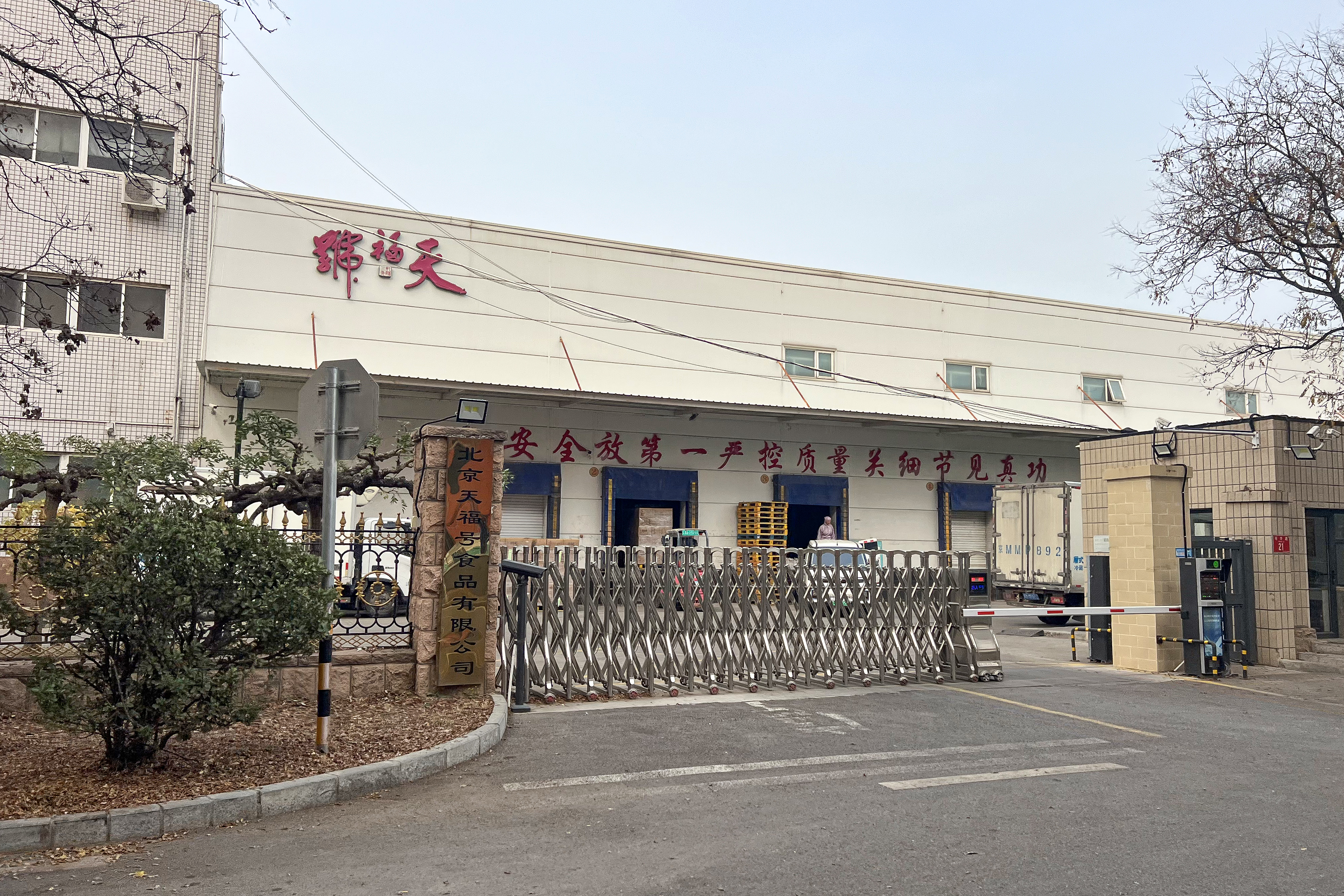
Tian Fu Hao headquarters, 2024

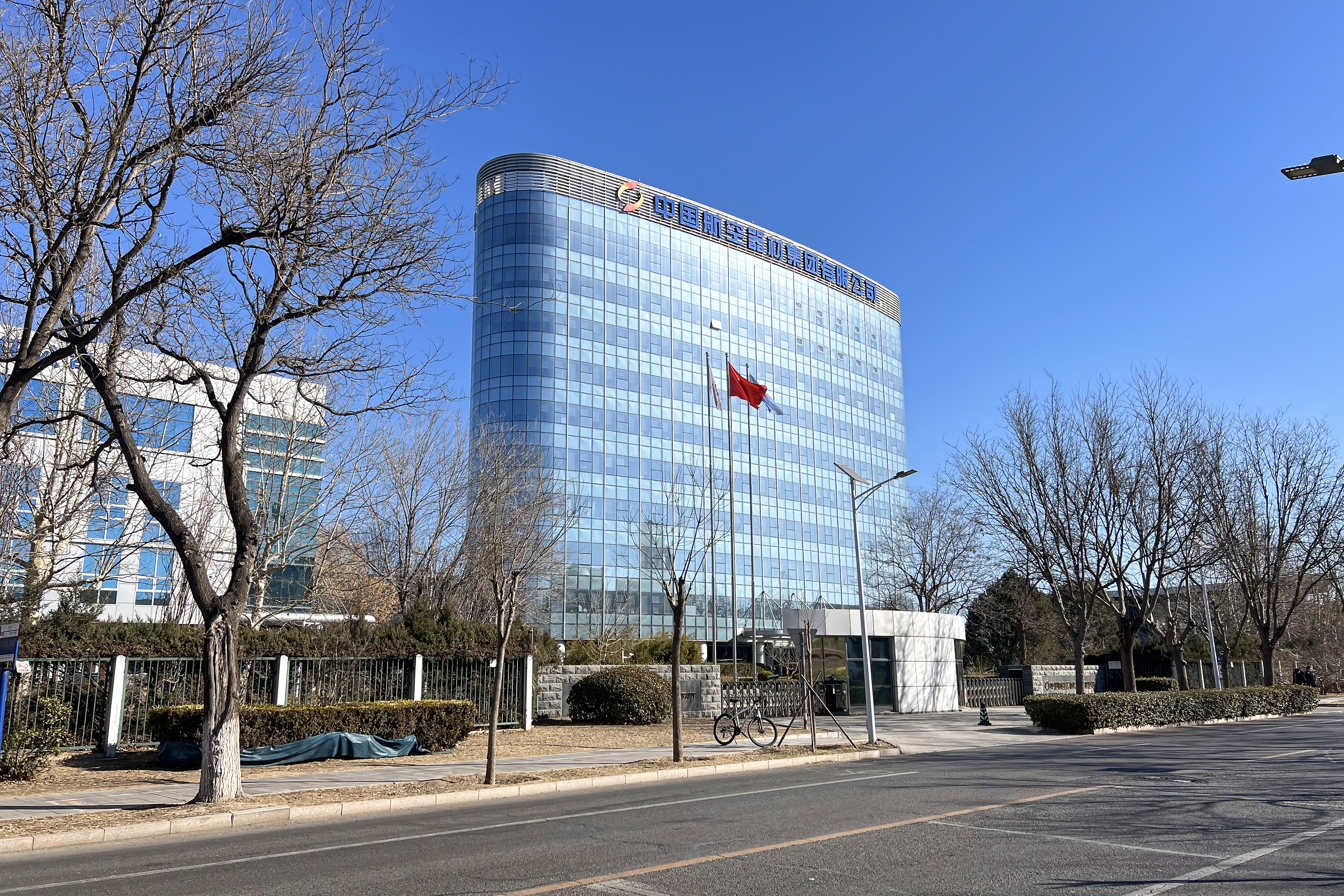
China Aviation Supplies Holding Company headquarters, 2025

== See also ==
- List of township-level divisions of Beijing
