= Capital Airport Subdistrict =

Capital Airport Subdistrict 首都机场街道
- Subdistrict
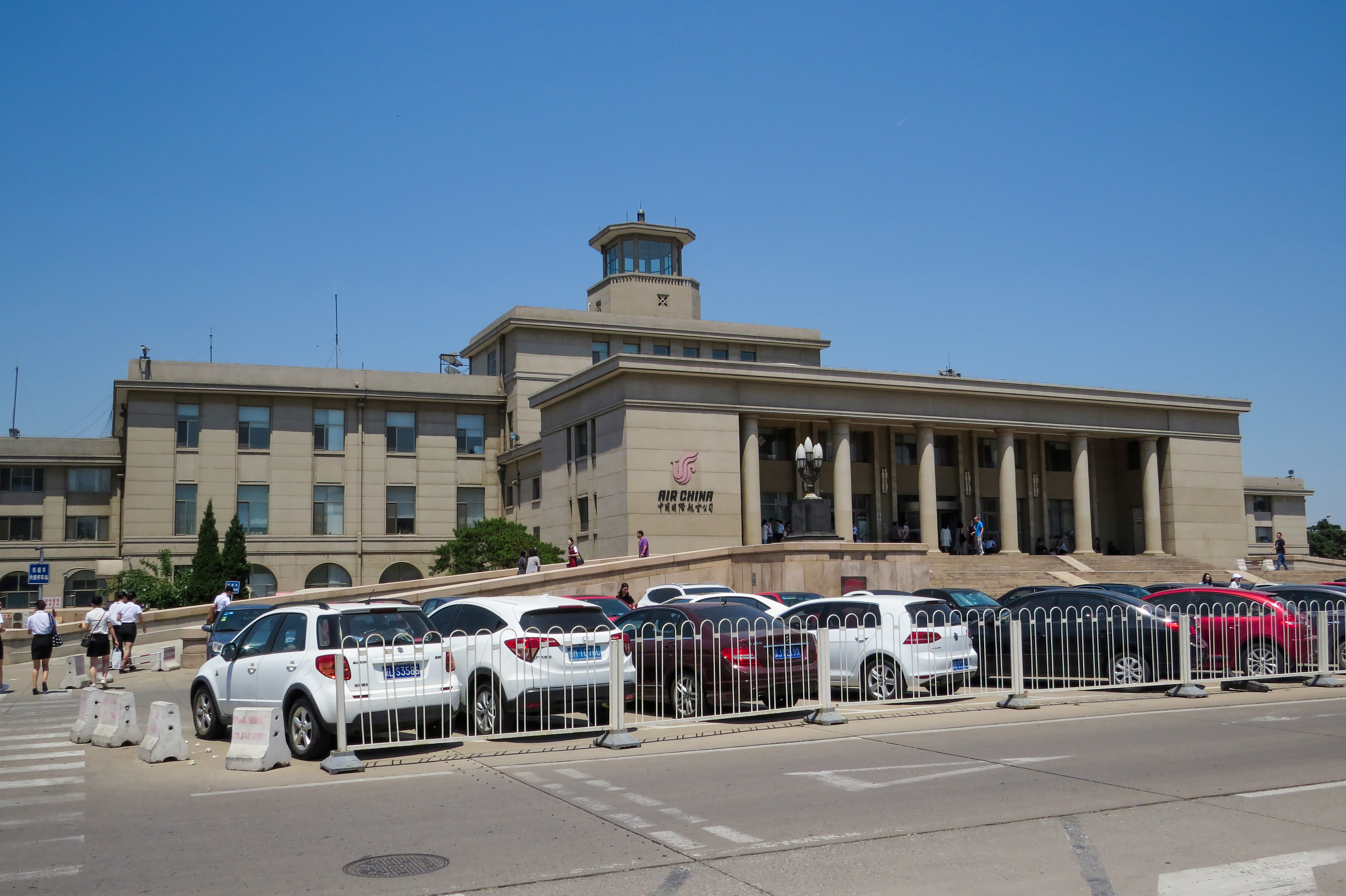
- Oldest terminal of Beijing Capital International Airport, 2017

- Location within Beijing Location within China
- Coordinates: 40°02′49″N 116°35′09″E
- Country: China
- Municipality: Beijing
- District: Chaoyang
- Village-level Divisions: 5 communities

Area
  - Total: 12.2 km^{2} (4.7 sq mi)

Population (2020)
  - Total: 16,837
  - Density: 1,380/km^{2} (3,570/sq mi)
- Time zone: UTC+8 (China Standard)
- Postal code: 100621
- Area code: 010

Capital Airport Subdistrict (Chinese: 首都机场街道; pinyin: Shǒudū Jīchǎng Jiēdào) is a subdistrict and an exclave of Chaoyang District, Beijing, China. It borders Nanfaxin and Houshayu Towns to the north, and Tianzhu Town to other three directions. It hosts Terminal 1 and 2 of the Beijing Capital International Airport, and as of 2020, it had a population of 16,837. Terminal 3 of Beijing Capital International Airport is located in Tianzhu, Shunyi District, Beijing.

== History ==
Timeline of changes in the status of Capital Airport Subdistrict
Time	Status
Liao dynasty	Part of Tianzhu Village (today: Tianzhu, Beijing)
1949	Part of Shunyi County, Tongzhou Division, Hebei
1957	Construction site of Beijing Capital International Airport was incorporated into Chaoyang District, Beijing
1959	Lands no related to agriculture and farmer residence were also incorporated into Chaoyang District
1960	Capital Airport Subdistrict was created
1966	Changed to Capital Airport People's Commune
1978	Restored as a subdistrict

== Administrative Division ==
As of 2021, there were a total of 5 communities under Capital Airport Subdistrict, in which 4 were residential communities and 1 being the working area of the Beijing Capital International Airport:

Administrative Division Code	Community Name in Pinyin and English	Community Name in Simplified Chinese
110105400001	Nanlu Xili	南路西里
110105400002	Nanlu Dongli	南路东里
110105400003	Xipingjie	西平街
110105400004	Xipingli	南平里
110105400400	Jichang (Airport)	机场

== See also ==
- List of township-level divisions of Beijing
