= Yukou, Beijing =

Yukou Town 峪口镇
- Town
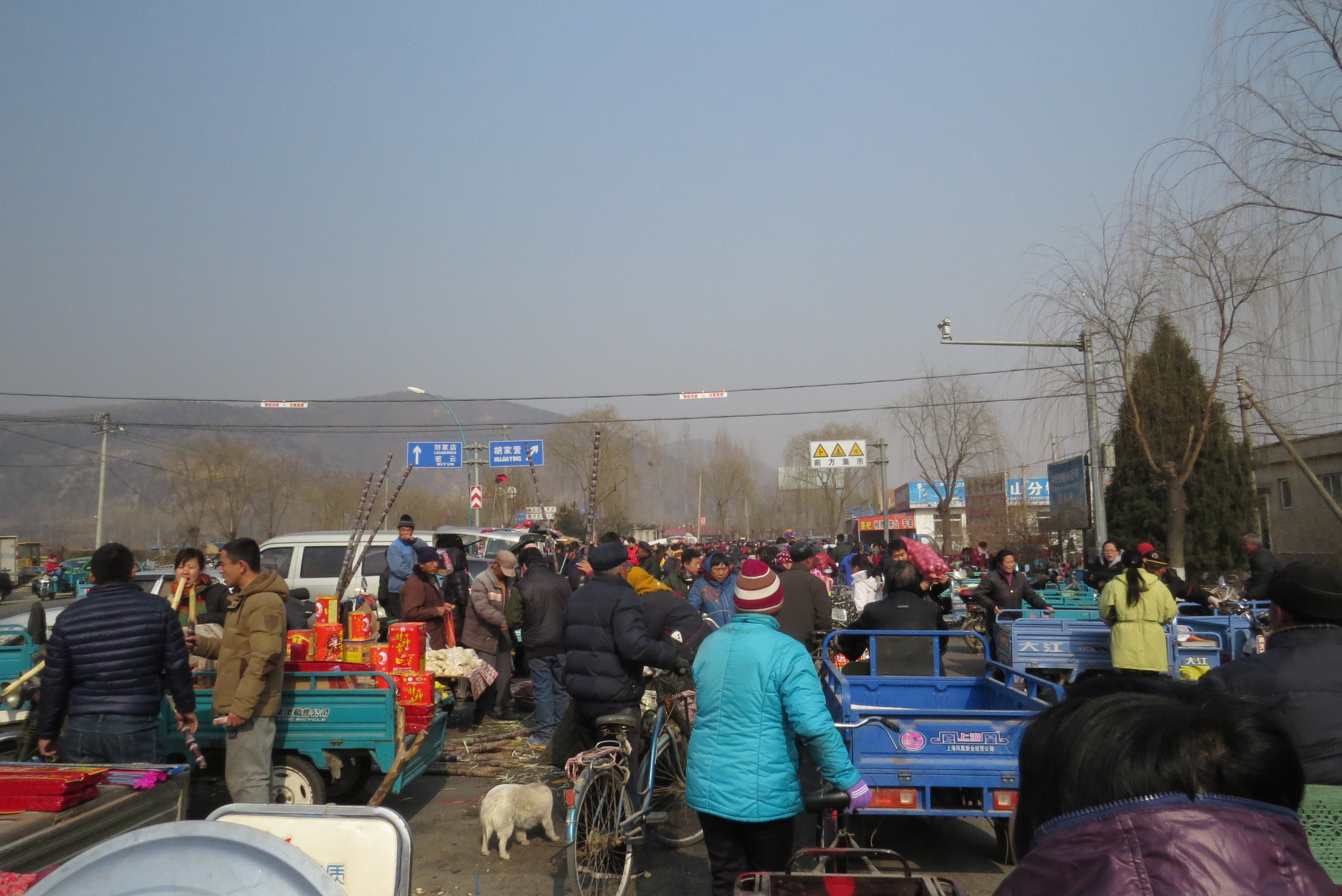
- Chinese Lunar New Year Country Fair in Yukou, 2015

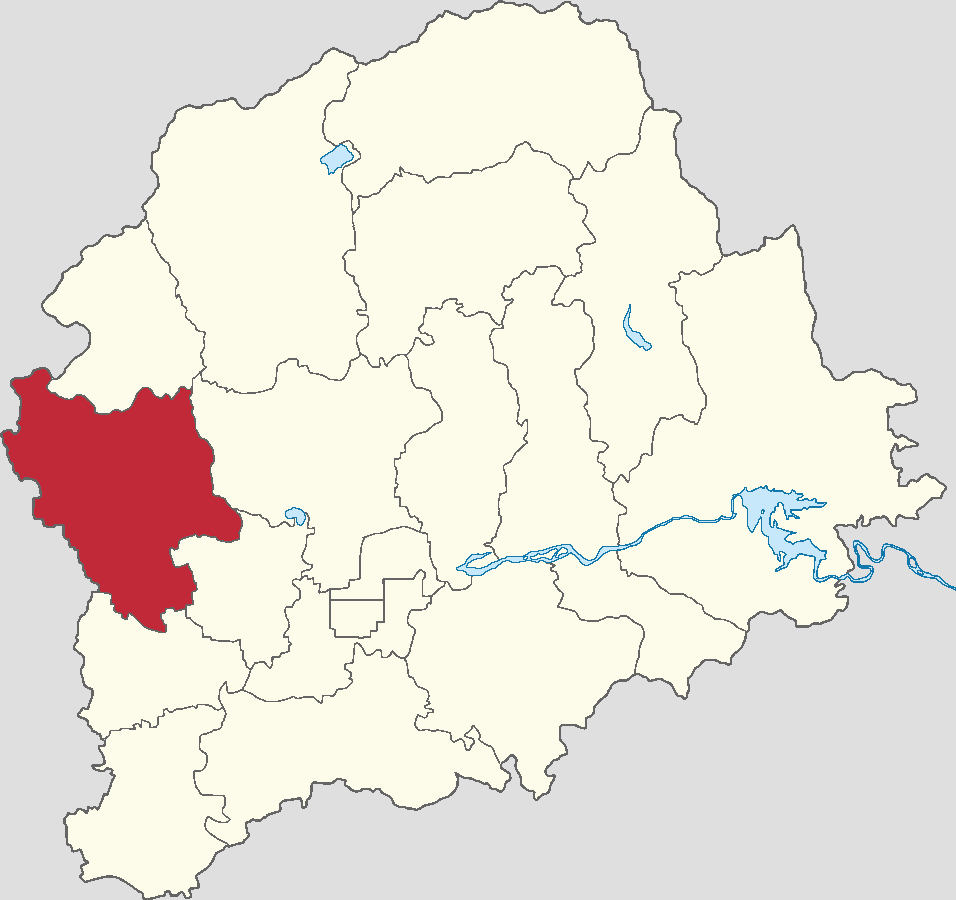
- Location in Pinggu District

- Location within Beijing Location within China
- Coordinates: 40°10′58″N 117°00′09″E
- Country: China
- Municipality: Beijing
- District: Pinggu
- Village-level Divisions: 1 communities 19 villages

Area
  - Total: 64.1 km^{2} (24.7 sq mi)
- Elevation: 38 m (125 ft)

Population (2020)
  - Total: 28,385
  - Density: 443/km^{2} (1,150/sq mi)
- Time zone: UTC+8 (China Standard)
- Postal code: 101206
- Area code: 010

Yukou Town (Chinese: 峪口镇; pinyin: Yùkǒu Zhèn) is a town on the eastern side of Pinggu District, Beijing, China. It shares border with Dongshaoqu and Liujiadian Towns to the north, Wangxinzhuang and Daxingzhuang Towns to the east, Machangying Town to the south, as well as Zhang and Longwantun Towns to the west. It was home to 28,385 people as of 2020.

The name Yukou (Chinese: 峪口; lit. 'Ravine Mouth') refers to its location at the entrance of mountain valleys to the north.

== History ==
Timeline of Yukou Town
Year	Status	Part of
1947 - 1956	5th District	Pinngu County, Hebei
1956 - 1958	Yukou Township	Pinngu County, Hebei
1958 - 1961	Yukou Management Area, within Yukou People's Commune	Pinggu County, Beijing
1961 - 1984	Yukou People's Commune Beiyangjiaqiao People's Commune	Pinggu County, Beijing
1984 - 1990	Yukou Township Beiyangjiaqiao Township	Pinggu County, Beijing
1990 - 2000	Yukou Town Beiyangjiaqiao Township	Pinggu County, Beijing
2000 - 2002	Yukou Town	Pinggu County, Beijing
2002–present	Yukou Area (Yukou Town)	Pinggu District, Beijing

== Administrative divisions ==
In 2021, Yukou Town was composed of 20 subdivisions, with 1 community and 19 villages. The subdivisions are listed in the following table:

Subdivision names	Name transliterations	Type
峪口	Yukou	Community
西营	Xiying	Village
东樊各庄	Dong Fangezhuang	Village
西樊各庄	Xi Fangezhuang	Village
三白山	Sanbaishan	Village
胡家营	Hujiaying	Village
兴隆庄	Xinglongzhuang	Village
中桥	Zhongqiao	Village
蔡坨	Caituo	Village
南营	Nanying	Village
坨头寺	Tuotousi	Village
胡辛庄	Huxinzhuang	Village
梨各庄	Ligezhuang	Village
北杨家桥	Bei Yangjiaqiao	Village
南杨家桥	Nan Yangjiaqiao	Village
桥头	Qiaotou	Village
厂门口	Changmenkou	Village
云峰寺	Yunfengsi	Village
大官庄	Daguanzhuang	Village
小官庄	Xiaoguanzhuang	Village

== See also ==
- List of township-level divisions of Beijing
