= Mafang, Beijing =

Mafang Town 马坊镇
- Town
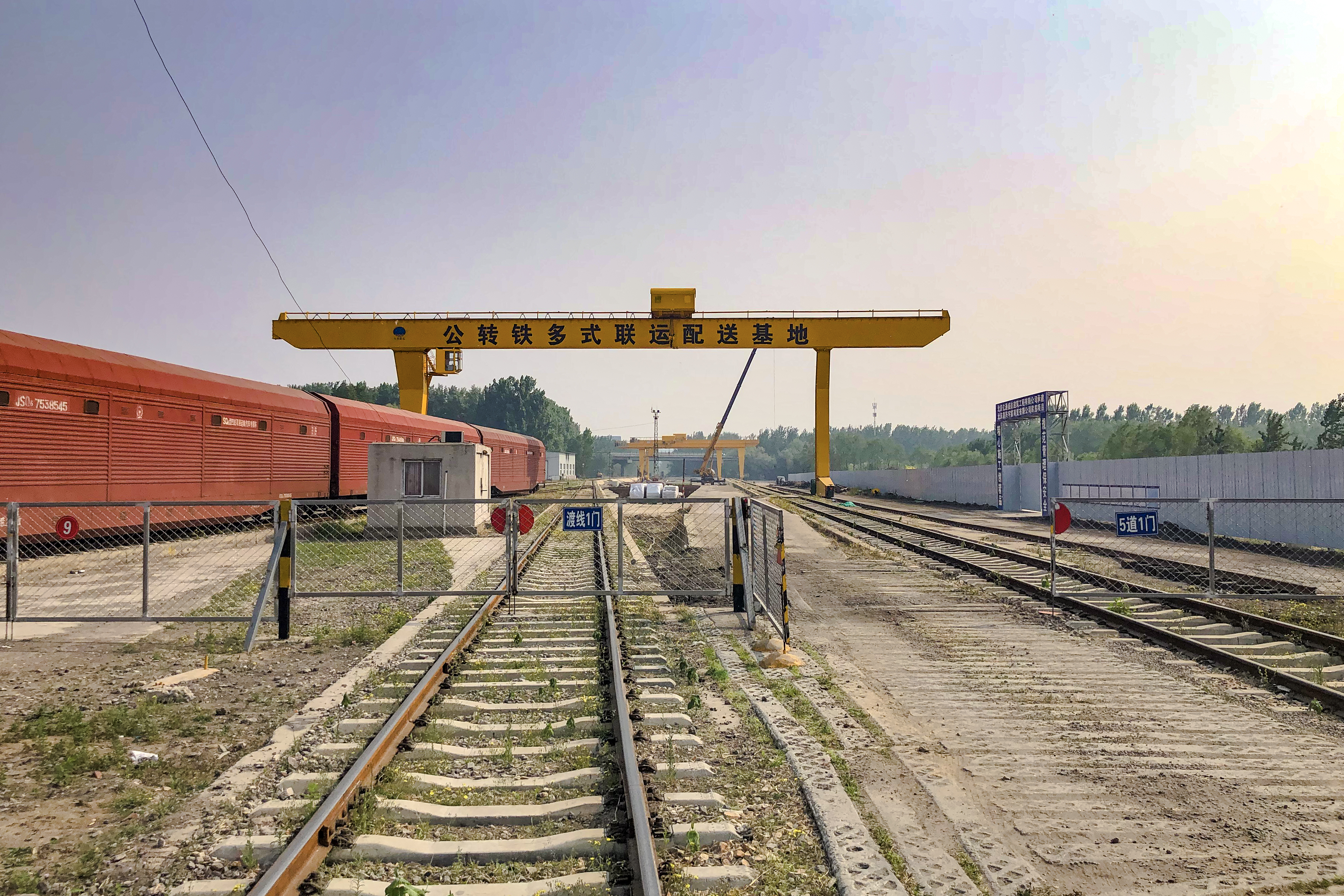
- Freight Yard of Mafang Railway Station, 2020

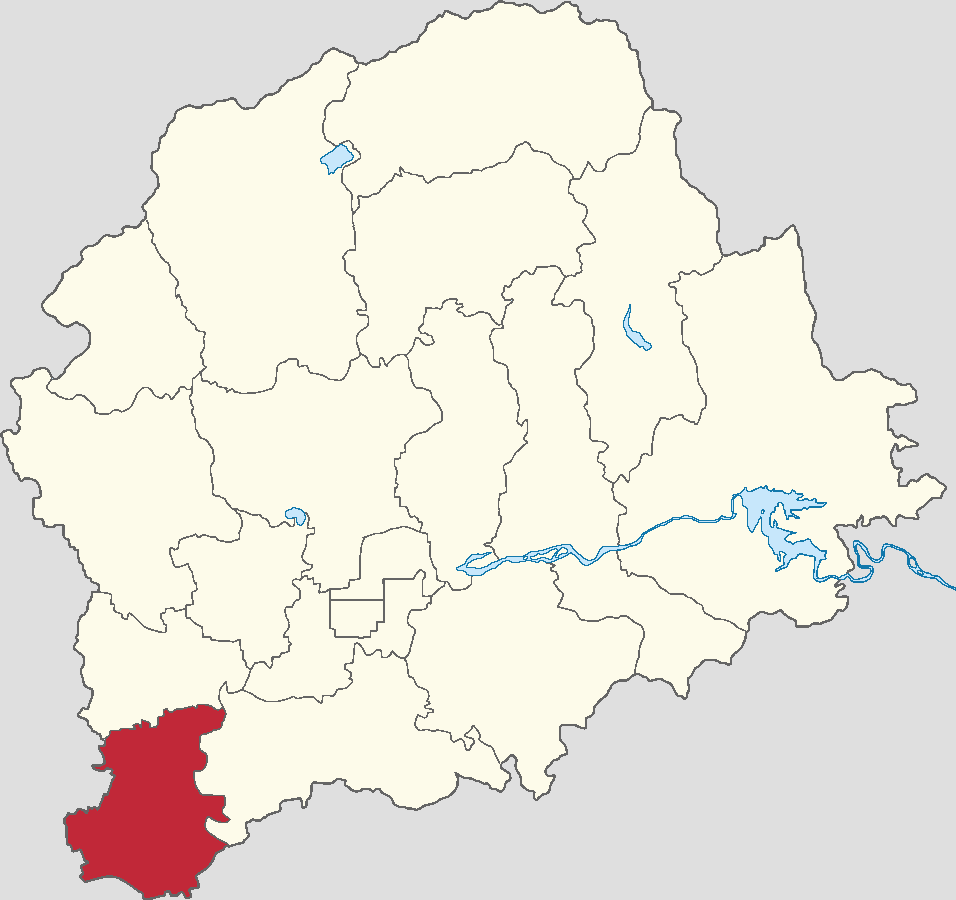
- Location of Mafang Town in Pinggu District

- Location within Beijing Location within China
- Coordinates: 40°04′48″N 117°00′16″E
- Country: China
- Municipality: Beijing
- District: Pinggu
- Village-level Divisions: 4 communities 22 villages

Area
  - Total: 37.28 km^{2} (14.39 sq mi)
- Elevation: 25 m (82 ft)

Population (2020)
  - Total: 29,601
  - Density: 794.0/km^{2} (2,056/sq mi)
- Time zone: UTC+8 (China Standard)
- Postal code: 101204
- Area code: 010

Mafang Town (Chinese: 马坊镇; pinyin: Mǎfáng Zhèn) is a town situated inside of Pinggu District, Beijing, China. It shares border with Machangying Town to the north, Donggaocun Town to the east, Nanniezhuang Village to the south, and Dasungezhuang Town to the west. It was home to 29,601 people as of 2020.

This region had been a horse farm for military usage from Liao dynasty all the way to Qing dynasty, thus receiving its name Mafang (Chinese: 马坊; pinyin: Mǎfáng; lit. 'Horse Shop').

== History ==
Timeline of Mafang Town
Year	Status	Part of
1956–1958	Mafang Township Guogezhuang Township	Pinggu County, Hebei
1958–1961	Mafang management Area	Pinggu County, Beijing
1961–1975	Mafang People's Commune	
1975–1984	Mafang People's Commune Yingcheng People's Commune	
1984–1996	Mafang Township Yingcheng Township	
1996–2000	Mafang Town Yingcheng Township	
2000–2002	Mafang Town	
2002–present	Mafang Area (Mafang Town)	Pinggu District, Beijing

== Administrative divisions ==
In the year 2021, Mafang Town comprised the following 26 subdivisions, where 4 were communities and 22 were villages:

Subdivision names	Name transliterations	Type
汇景	Huijing	Community
慧谷	Huigu	Community
新农	Xinnong	Community
腾飞	Tengfei	Community
东店	Dongdian	Village
三条街	Santiaojie	Village
二条街	Ertiaojie	Village
西大街	Xidajie	Village
蒋里庄	Jianglizhuang	Village
塔寺	Tasi	Village
石佛寺	Shifosi	Village
李蔡街	Licaijie	Village
早立庄	Zaolizhuang	Village
河北村	Hebeicun	Village
小屯	Xiaotun	Village
英城	Yingcheng	Village
果各庄	Guogezhuang	Village
洼里	Wali	Village
梨羊	Liyang	Village
打铁庄	Datiezhuang	Village
西太平庄	Xitaipingzhuang	Village
新建队	Xinjiandui	Village
东撞	Dongzhuang	Village
杈子庄	Chazizhuang	Village
北石渠	Beishiqu	Village
河奎	Hekui	Village

== See also ==
- List of township-level divisions of Beijing
