= Longwantun =

Longwantun Town 龙湾屯镇
- Town
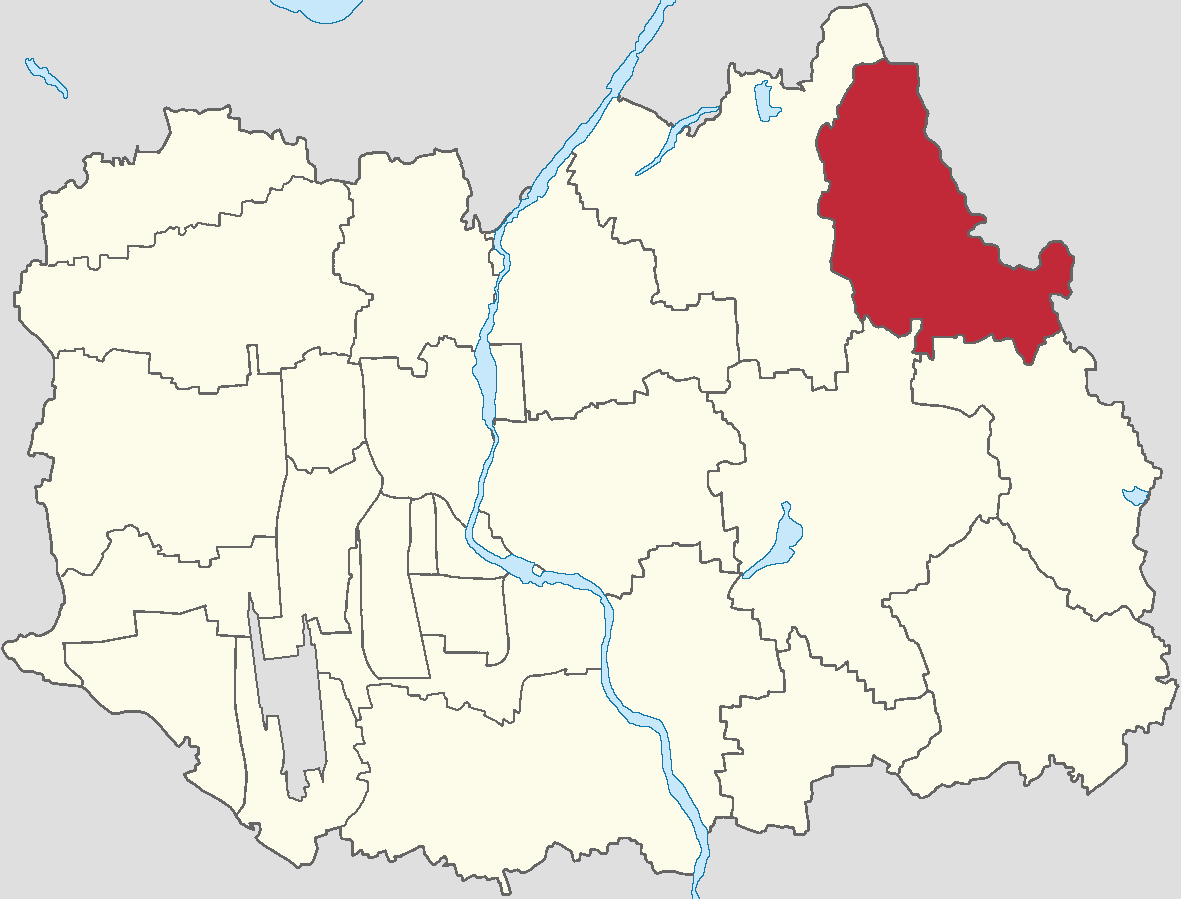
- Location of Longwantun Town within Shunyi District

- Location within Beijing Location within China
- Coordinates: 40°13′52″N 116°51′07″E
- Country: China
- Municipality: Beijing
- District: Shunyi
- Village-level Divisions: 13 villages

Area
  - Total: 57.2 km^{2} (22.1 sq mi)
- Elevation: 50 m (160 ft)

Population (2020)
  - Total: 14,212
  - Density: 248/km^{2} (644/sq mi)
- Time zone: UTC+8 (China Standard)
- Postal code: 101306
- Area code: 010

Longwantun Town (simplified Chinese: 龙湾屯镇; traditional Chinese: 龍灣屯鎮; pinyin: Lóngwāntún Zhèn) is a town in the northeastern part of Shunyi District, Beijing. The town is situated in a plane southwest of Zhigen and Zhongluo Mountains, and shares border with Dongbuqu Town to its northeast, Yukou Town to its southeast, Zhang and Yang Towns to its south, and Mulin Town to its west. The result of the 2020 census determined that Longwantun Town had 14,212 people residing within it.

This region received its name Longwantun (Chinese: 龙湾屯; lit. 'Dragon Bay Village') in the Tang dynasty, when Emperor Taizong stationed his troops for a night during his expedition against Goguryeo.

== History ==
Timeline of Longwantun Town
Time	Status	Part of
1912–1949		Sanhe County Huairou County Miyun County
1949–1958	1st District	Shunyi County
1958–1961	Part of Mulin People's Commune	Shunyi County
1961–1983	Longwantun People's Commune	Shunyi County
1983–1994	Longwantun Township	Shunyi County
1994–1998	Longwantun Town	Shunyi County
1998–present	Longwantun Town	Shunyi District

== Administrative divisions ==
In the year 2021, Longwantun Town consisted of 13 villages:

Administrative division code	Subdivision names	Name transliteration
110113111201	山里辛庄	Shanli Xinzhuang
110113111202	七连庄	Qilianzhuang
110113111203	柳庄户	Liuzhuanghu
110113111204	南坞	Nanwu
110113111205	树行	Shuxing
110113111206	张中坞	Zhangzhongwu
110113111207	史中坞	Shizhongwu
110113111208	丁甲庄	Dingjiazhuang
110113111209	小北坞	Xiao Beiwu
110113111210	大北坞	Da Beiwu
110113111211	焦庄户	Jiaozhuanghu
110113111212	唐洞	Tangdong
110113111213	龙湾屯	Longwantun

== See also ==
- List of township-level divisions of Beijing
