= Zhang, Beijing =

Zhang Town 张镇
- Town
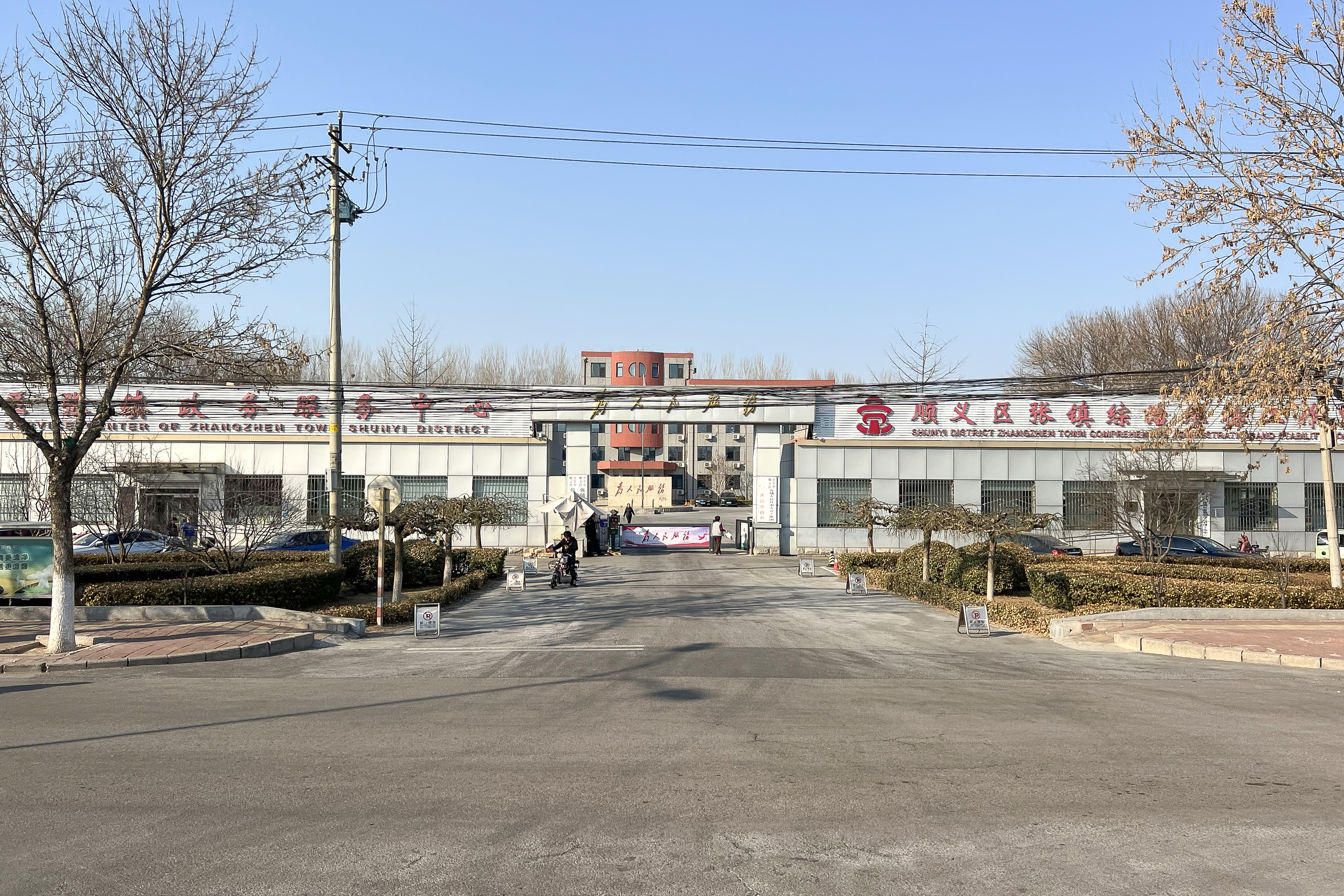

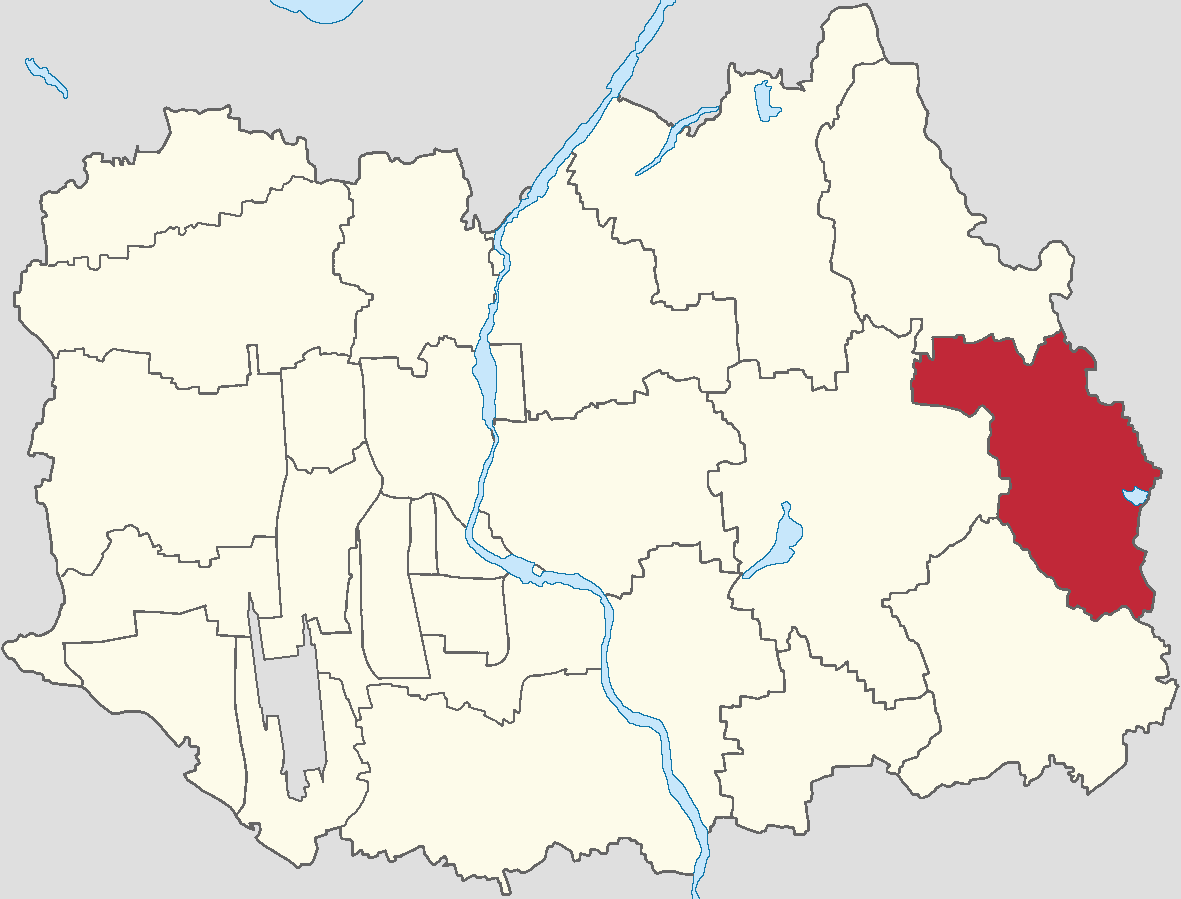
- Location of Zhang Town within Shunyi District

- Location within Beijing Location within China
- Coordinates: 40°09′02″N 116°56′43″E
- Country: China
- Municipality: Beijing
- District: Shunyi
- Village-level Divisions: 2 communities 29 villages

Area
  - Total: 53.34 km^{2} (20.59 sq mi)
- Elevation: 34 m (112 ft)

Population (2020)
  - Total: 24,795
  - Density: 464.8/km^{2} (1,204/sq mi)
- Time zone: UTC+8 (China Standard)
- Postal code: 101307
- Area code: 010

Zhang Town (simplified Chinese: 张镇; traditional Chinese: 張鎮; pinyin: Zhāng Zhèn) is a town on the east side of Shunyi District, Beijing. It borders Longwantun Town to the north, Yukou and Machangying Towns to the east, Dasungezhuang Town to the south, and Yang Town to the west. In the year 2020, its population was 24,795.

The town's name is referring to the town's origin as a settlement founded by people of the Zhang family during the Liao dynasty.

== History ==
Timetable of Zhang Town
Time	Status	Within
Liao to Ming dynasty	Zhanggezhuang (Incorporated Hezhuang, Mijiazhuang, Hetaoyuan and Nanjiazhuang during Ming dynasty)	
Qing dynasty	Yisan Township	Sanhe County
1912–1949	Yisan Town	Sanhe County
1949–1950	6th District	Shunyi County
1950–1958	1st District	Shunyi County
1958–1961	Zhanggezhuang Township	Shunyi County
1961–1983	Zhanggezhuang People's Commune Zhaogezhuang People's Commune	Shunyi County
1983–1989	Zhanggezhuang Township Zhaogezhuang Township	Shunyi County
1989–1997	Zhang Town Zhaogezhuang Township	Shunyi County
1997–1998	Zhang Town	Shunyi County
1998–present	Zhang Town	Shunyi District

== Administrative divisions ==
As of 2021, Zhang Town was made up of 31 subdivisions, in which 2 were communities and 29 villages:

Administrative division code	Subdivision names	Name transliteration	Type
110113110001	永强家园	Yongqiang Jiayuan	Community
110113110002	浅山香邑	Qianshan Xiangyi	Community
110113110201	良山	Liangshan	Village
110113110202	小三渠	Xiaosanqu	Village
110113110203	麻林山	Malinshan	Village
110113110204	贾家洼子	Jiajia Wazi	Village
110113110205	李家洼子	Lijia Wazi	Village
110113110206	吕布屯	Lübutun	Village
110113110207	雁户庄	Yanhutun	Village
110113110208	港西	Gangxi	Village
110113110209	大故现	Daguxian	Village
110113110210	刘辛庄	Liuxinzhuang	Village
110113110211	张各庄	Zhanggezhuang	Village
110113110212	厂门口	Changmenkou	Village
110113110213	虫王庙	Chongwangmiao	Village
110113110214	北营	Beiying	Village
110113110215	西营	Xiying	Village
110113110216	小曹庄	Xiaocaozhuang	Village
110113110217	驻马庄	Zhumazhuang	Village
110113110218	柏树庄	Boshuzhuang	Village
110113110219	白辛庄	Baixinzhuang	Village
110113110220	赵各庄	Zhaogezhuang	Village
110113110221	后王会	Hou Wanghui	Village
110113110222	前王会	Qian Wanghui	Village
110113110223	后苏桥	Hou Suqiao	Village
110113110224	前苏桥	Qian Suqiao	Village
110113110225	王庄	Wangzhuang	Village
110113110226	聂庄	Niezhuang	Village
110113110227	朱庄	Zhuzhuang	Village
110113110228	侯庄	Houzhuang	Village
110113110229	行宫	Xinggong	Village

== See also ==
- List of township-level divisions of Beijing
