= Dasungezhuang =

Dasungezhuang Town 大孙各庄镇
- Town
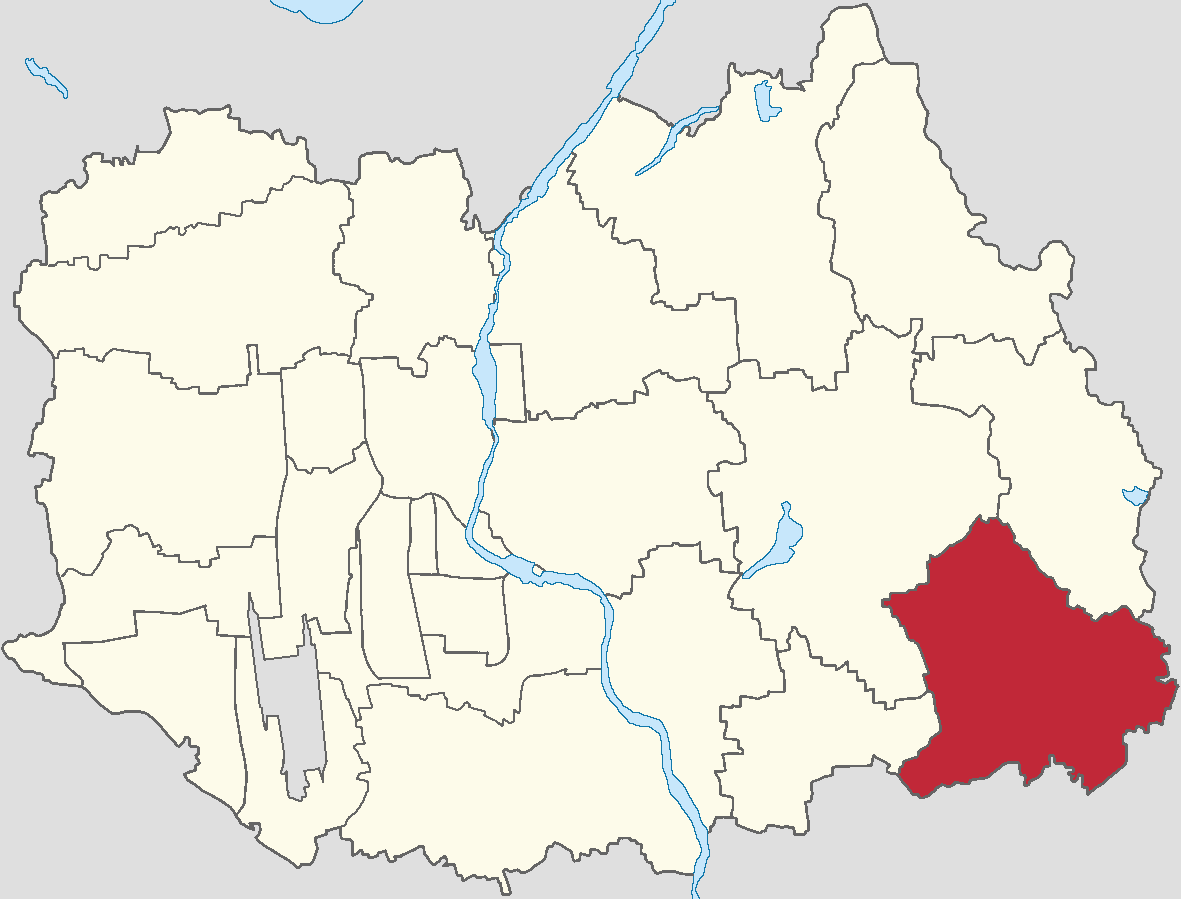
- Location of Dasungezhuang Town within Shunyi District

- Location within Beijing Location within China
- Coordinates: 40°05′02″N 116°55′19″E
- Country: China
- Municipality: Beijing
- District: Shunyi
- Village-level Divisions: 39 villages

Area
  - Total: 69 km^{2} (27 sq mi)
- Elevation: 35 m (115 ft)

Population (2020)
  - Total: 23,712
  - Density: 340/km^{2} (890/sq mi)
- Time zone: UTC+8 (China Standard)
- Postal code: 101308
- Area code: 010

Dasungezhuang Town (simplified Chinese: 大孙各庄镇; traditional Chinese: 大孫各莊鎮; pinyin: Dàsūngèzhuāng Zhèn) is a town situated on the southeastern portion of Shunyi District, Beijing. It shares border with Zhang Town in its north, Machangying and Mafang Towns in its east, Gaolou Town in its south, Beiwu and Yang Towns in the west. In 2020, it was home to 23,712 residents.

Dasungezhuang was originally known as Dasonggezhuang (Chinese: 大松各庄; lit. 'Great Pine Family Villa') during the Ming dynasty, which referred to the pine forest surrounding the settlement.

== History ==
Timeline of Dasungezhuang Town's History
| Time | Status | Belonged to |
|---|---|---|
| 1912–1949 | 6th District 7th District | Sanhe County |
| 1949–1950 | 6th District | Shunyi County |
| 1950–1956 | 4th District | Shunyi County |
| 1956–1958 | Houlingshang Township Nanniezhuang Township | Shunyi County |
| 1958–1962 | Part of Zhanggezhaung People's Commune | Shunyi County |
| 1962–1983 | Dasungezhuang People's Commune | Shunyi County |
| 1983–1994 | Dasungezhuang Township | Shunyi County |
| 1994–1998 | Dasungezhuang Town (Incorporated Yinjiafu Township in 1997) | Shunyi County |
| 1998–present | Dasungezhuang Town (Incorporated Yinjiafu Township in 1997) | Shunyi District |

== Administrative divisions ==
In the year 2021, Dasungezhuang Town was composed of 39 villages:

| Administrative division code | Subdivision names | Name transliteration |
|---|---|---|
| 110113109201 | 大孙各庄 | Da Sungezhuang |
| 110113109202 | 客家庄 | Kejiazhuang |
| 110113109203 | 西辛庄 | Xixinzhuang |
| 110113109204 | 户耳山 | Hu'ershan |
| 110113109205 | 宗家店 | Zongjiadian |
| 110113109206 | 柴家林 | Chaijialin |
| 110113109207 | 顾家庄 | Gujiazhuang |
| 110113109208 | 小故现 | Xiao Guxian |
| 110113109209 | 田各庄 | Tiangezhuang |
| 110113109210 | 吴雄寺 | Wuxiongsi |
| 110113109211 | 小宋各庄 | Xiao Songgezhuang |
| 110113109212 | 小塘 | Xiaotan |
| 110113109213 | 南聂庄 | Nanniezhuang |
| 110113109214 | 王户庄 | Wanghuzhuang |
| 110113109215 | 龙庭侯村 | Longtinghou Cun |
| 110113109216 | 老公庄 | Loagongzhuang |
| 110113109217 | 大坝洼庄 | Da Bawazhuang |
| 110113109218 | 小坝洼庄 | Xiao Bawazhuang |
| 110113109219 | 大塘 | Datang |
| 110113109220 | 佟辛庄 | Zhongxinzhuang |
| 110113109221 | 薛庄 | Xuezhuang |
| 110113109222 | 前岭上 | Qian Lingshang |
| 110113109223 | 后岭上 | Hou Lingshang |
| 110113109224 | 东华山 | Dong Huashan |
| 110113109225 | 西华山 | Xi Huashan |
| 110113109226 | 大段 | Daduan |
| 110113109227 | 小段 | Xiaoduan |
| 110113109228 | 谢辛庄 | Xiexinzhuang |
| 110113109229 | 赵家峪 | Zhaojiayu |
| 110113109230 | 湘王庄 | Xiangwangzhuang |
| 110113109231 | 四福庄 | Sifuzhuang |
| 110113109232 | 后陆马庄 | Hou Lumazhuang |
| 110113109233 | 前陆马庄 | Qian Lumazhuang |
| 110113109234 | 西尹家府 | Xi Yinjiafu |
| 110113109235 | 东尹家府 | Dong Yinjiafu |
| 110113109236 | 大崔各庄 | Da Cuigezhuang |
| 110113109237 | 大石各庄 | Da Shigezhuang |
| 110113109238 | 大田庄 | Datianzhuang |
| 110113109239 | 大洛泡 | Daluopao |

== See also ==
- List of township-level divisions of Beijing
