= Yang, Beijing =

Yang Town 杨镇
- Town
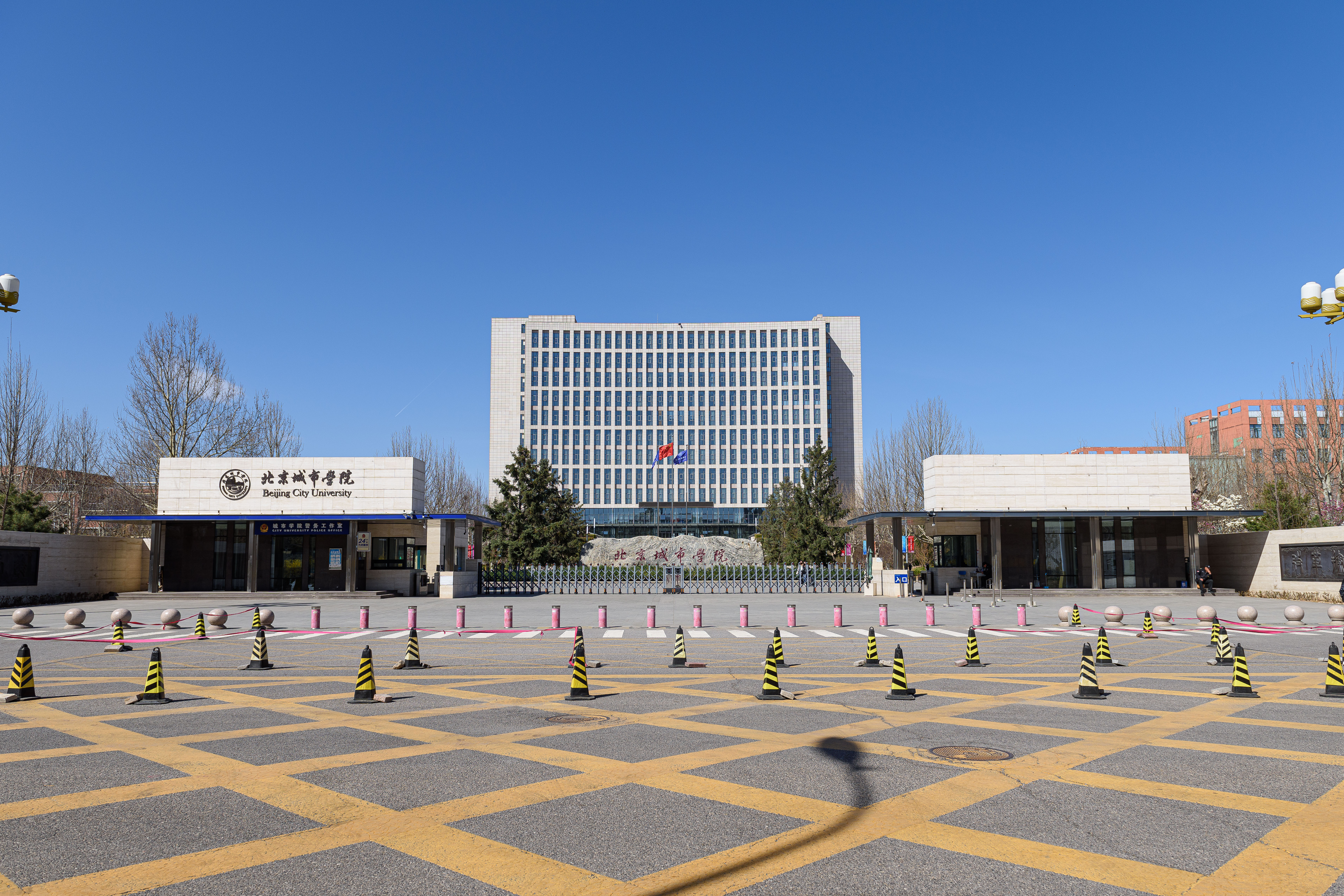
- Beijing City University within the town, 2024

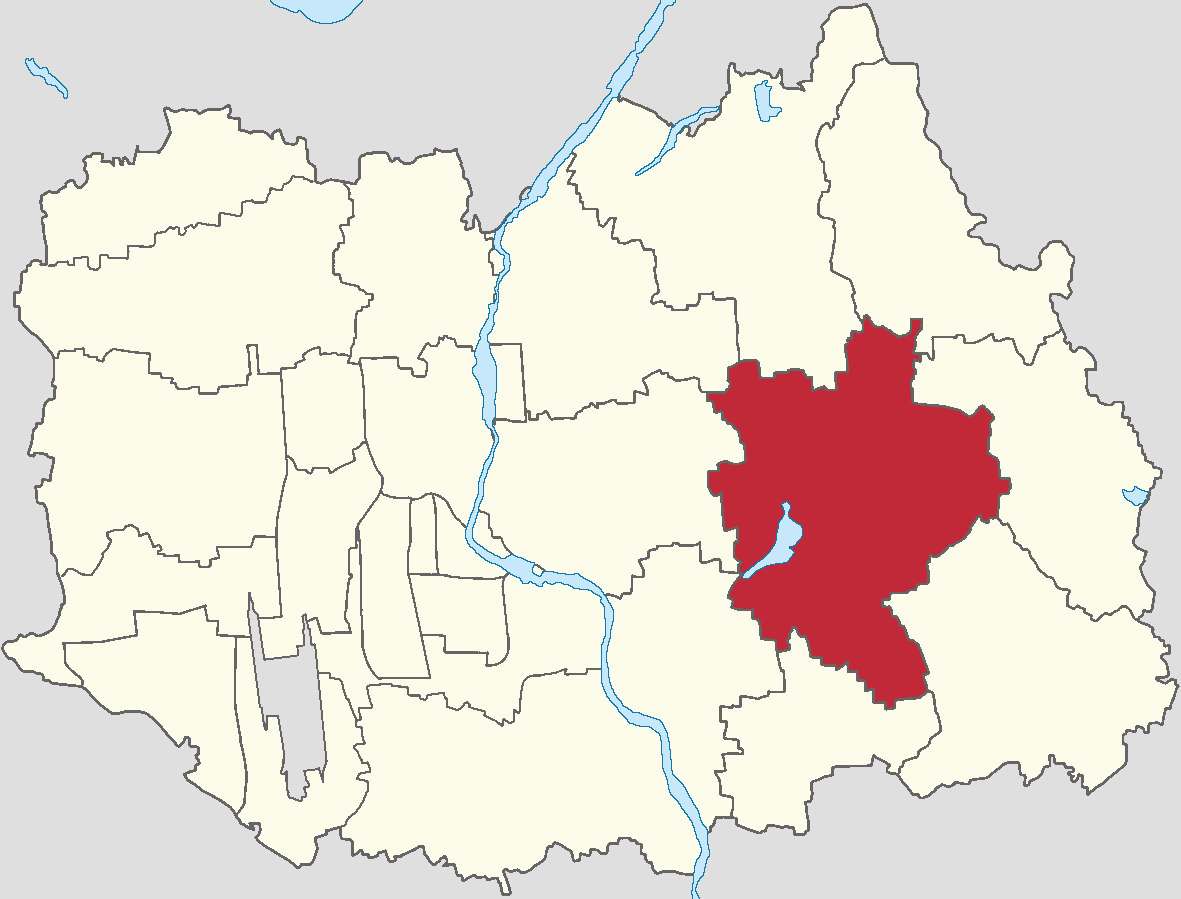
- Location of Yang Town within Shunyi District

- Location within Beijing Location within China
- Coordinates: 40°08′59″N 116°49′18″E
- Country: China
- Municipality: Beijing
- District: Shunyi
- Village-level Divisions: 4 communities 41 villages

Area
  - Total: 96.16 km^{2} (37.13 sq mi)
- Elevation: 38 m (125 ft)

Population (2020)
  - Total: 64,578
  - Density: 671.6/km^{2} (1,739/sq mi)
- Time zone: UTC+8 (China Standard)
- Postal code: 101309
- Area code: 010

Yang Town (simplified Chinese: 杨镇; traditional Chinese: 楊鎮; pinyin: Yáng Zhèn) is a town located within Shunyi District, Beijing, China. It shares border with Mulin and Longwantun Towns to its north, Zhang Town to its east, Dasungezhuang and Beiwu Towns to its south, Beisui and Nancai Towns to its west, and Beixiaoying Town to its northwest. As of 2020, it had a population of 64,578.

The settlement here was used to be called Mazhuang (马庄), but with the reign of Wanli Emperor, it was changed to Yangzhen (Chinese: 杨镇; lit. 'Yang's Town') due to the increasing influence of Yang family within the area.

== History ==
Timeline of Yangzhen's History
Year	Status	Belonged to
1949–1958	2nd District	Shunyi County
1958–1983	Yanggezhuang People's Commune (part of north and south were givent to Ligezhuang and Xiaodian People's Communes respectively in 1975)	Shunyi County
1983–1990	Yanggezhuang Township	Shunyi County
1990–1998	Yanggezhuang Town (Incorporated Xiaodian Township in 1994, Shaling Township in 1997)	Shunyi County
1998–2000	Yangzhen Area	Shunyi District
2000–present	Yangzhen Area (Yangzhen Town)	Shunyi District

== Administrative divisions ==
In 2021, Yang Town consisted of 45 subdivisions, including 4 communities and 41 villages:

Administrative division code	Subdivision names	Name transliteration	Type
110113006001	杨镇第一	Yangzhen Diyi	Community
110113006002	杨镇第二	Yangzhen Di'er	Community
110113006003	杨镇第三	Yangzhen Disan	Community
110113006004	杨镇鑫园	Yangzhen Xinyuan	Community
110113006201	一街	Yijie	Village
110113006202	二街	Erjie	Village
110113006203	三街	Sanjie	Village
110113006204	张家务	Zhangjiawu	Village
110113006205	齐家务	Qijiawu	Village
110113006206	杜庄	Duzhuang	Village
110113006207	东庄户	Dongzhuanghu	Village
110113006208	老庄户	Laozhuanghu	Village
110113006209	二郎庙	Erlangmiao	Village
110113006210	沟东	Goudong	Village
110113006211	东疃	Dongtuan	Village
110113006212	红寺	Hongsi	Village
110113006213	下坡	Xiapo	Village
110113006214	下营	Xiaying	Village
110113006215	安乐庄	Anlezhuang	Village
110113006216	汉石桥	Hanshiqiao	Village
110113006217	沙子营	Shaziying	Village
110113006218	小店	Xiaodian	Village
110113006219	辛庄子	Xinzhuangzi	Village
110113006220	田家营	Tianjiaying	Village
110113006221	高各庄	Gaogezhuang	Village
110113006222	王辛庄	Wangxinzhuang	Village
110113006223	井上	Jingshang	Village
110113006224	荆坨	JIngtuo	Village
110113006225	侉子营	Kuaziying	Village
110113006226	李辛庄	Lixinzhuang	Village
110113006227	松各庄	Songgezhuang	Village
110113006228	破罗口	Poluokou	Village
110113006229	别庄	Biezhuang	Village
110113006230	徐庄	Xuzhuang	Village
110113006231	良庄	Liangzhuang	Village
110113006232	大曹庄	Dacaozhuang	Village
110113006233	周庄	Zhouzhuang	Village
110113006234	沙岭	Shaling	Village
110113006235	曾庄	Zengzhuang	Village
110113006236	白塔	Baita	Village
110113006237	焦各庄村	Jiaogezhuang Cun	Village
110113006238	于庄	Yuzhuang	Village
110113006239	东庞里	Dong Pangli	Village
110113006240	西庞里	Xi Pangli	Village
110113006241	辛庄户	Xinzhuanghu	Village
110113006242	大三渠	Dasanqu	Village

== Transportation ==
Yangzhen is approximately 1 hour by bus from downtown Beijing's Dongzhimen (东直门) long-distance bus terminal.

== Gallery ==
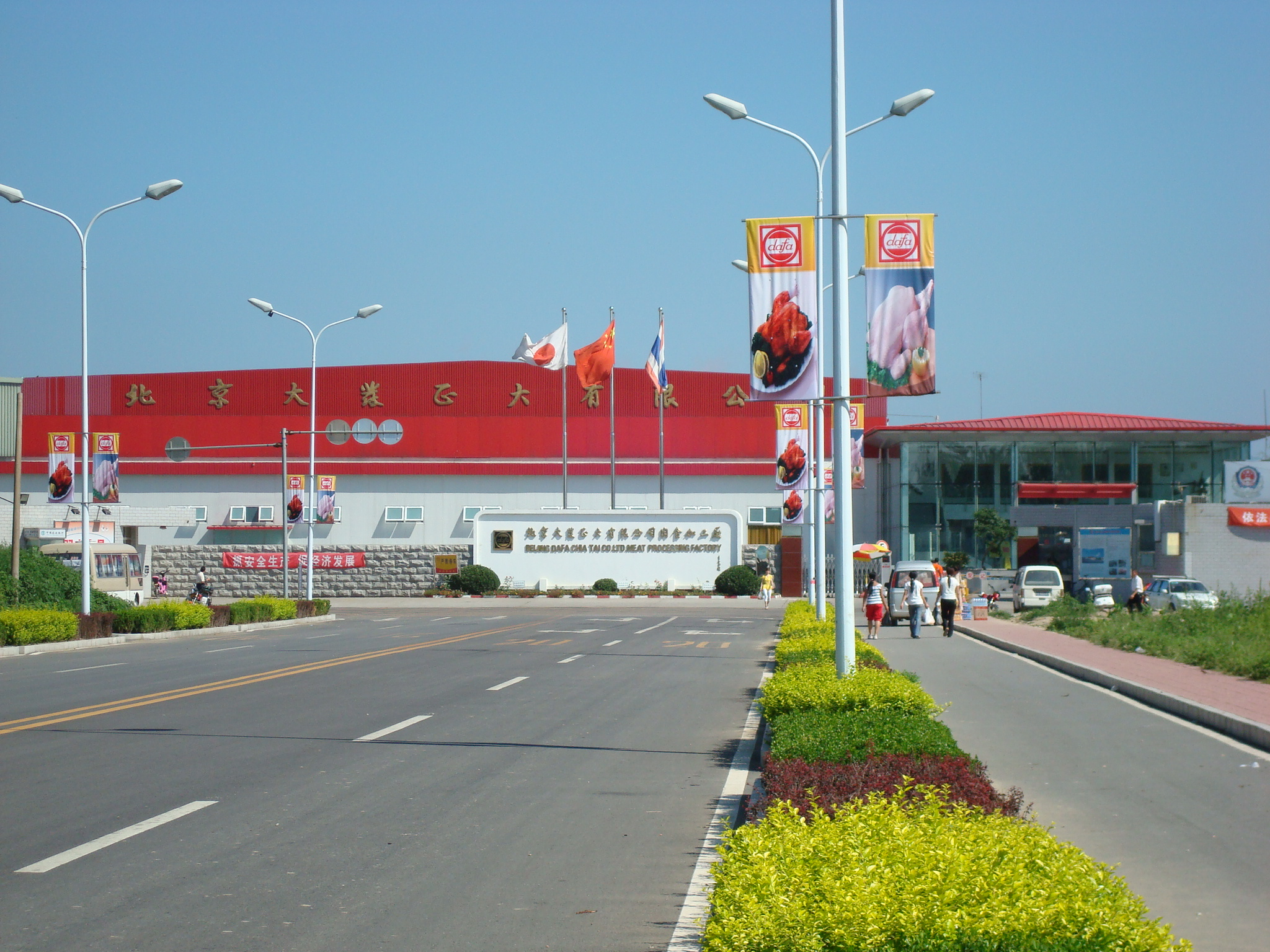
Beijing Dafa Zhengda Ltd. Co., 2007

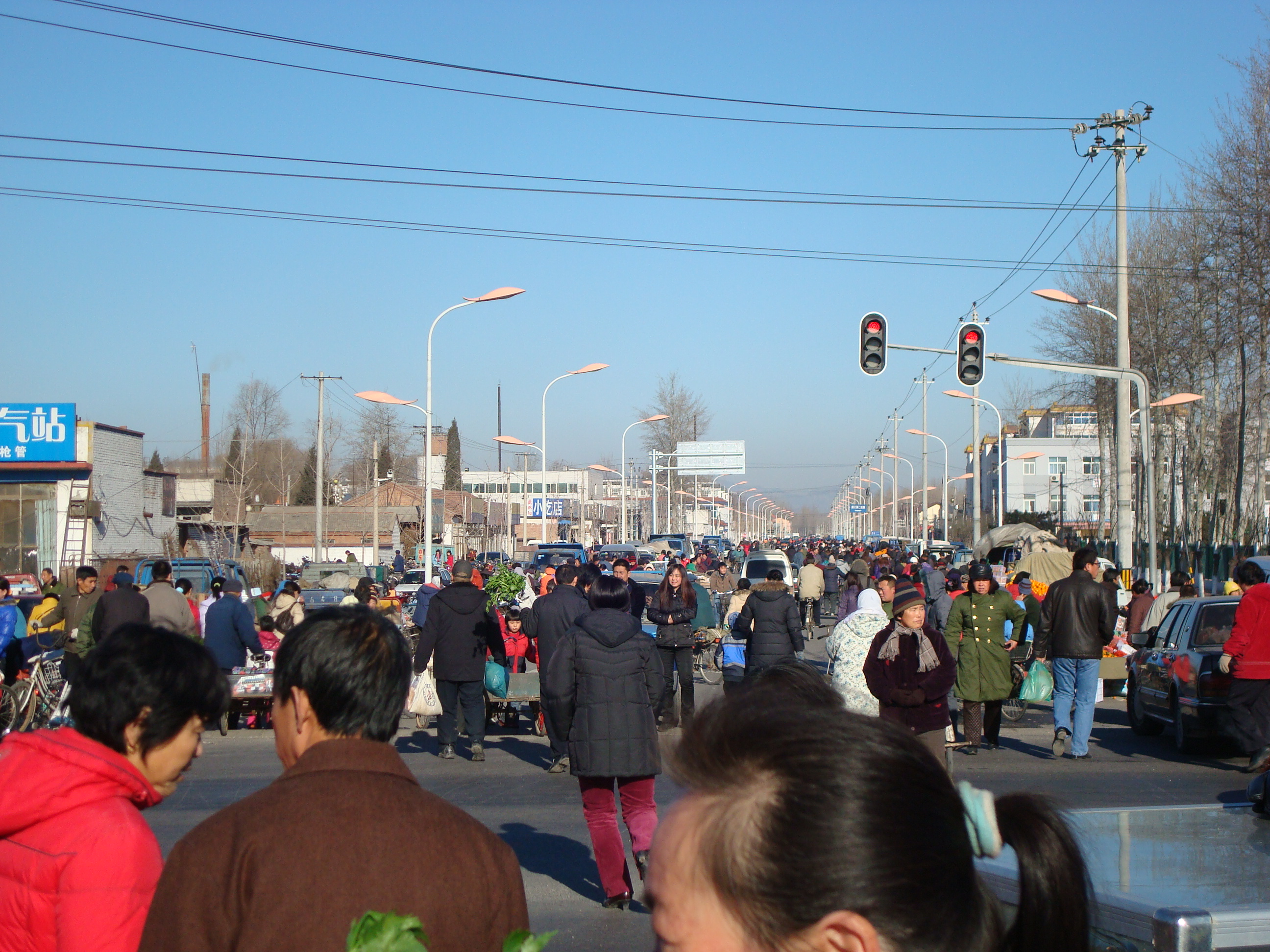
Shunping Road on the center of the town, 2008

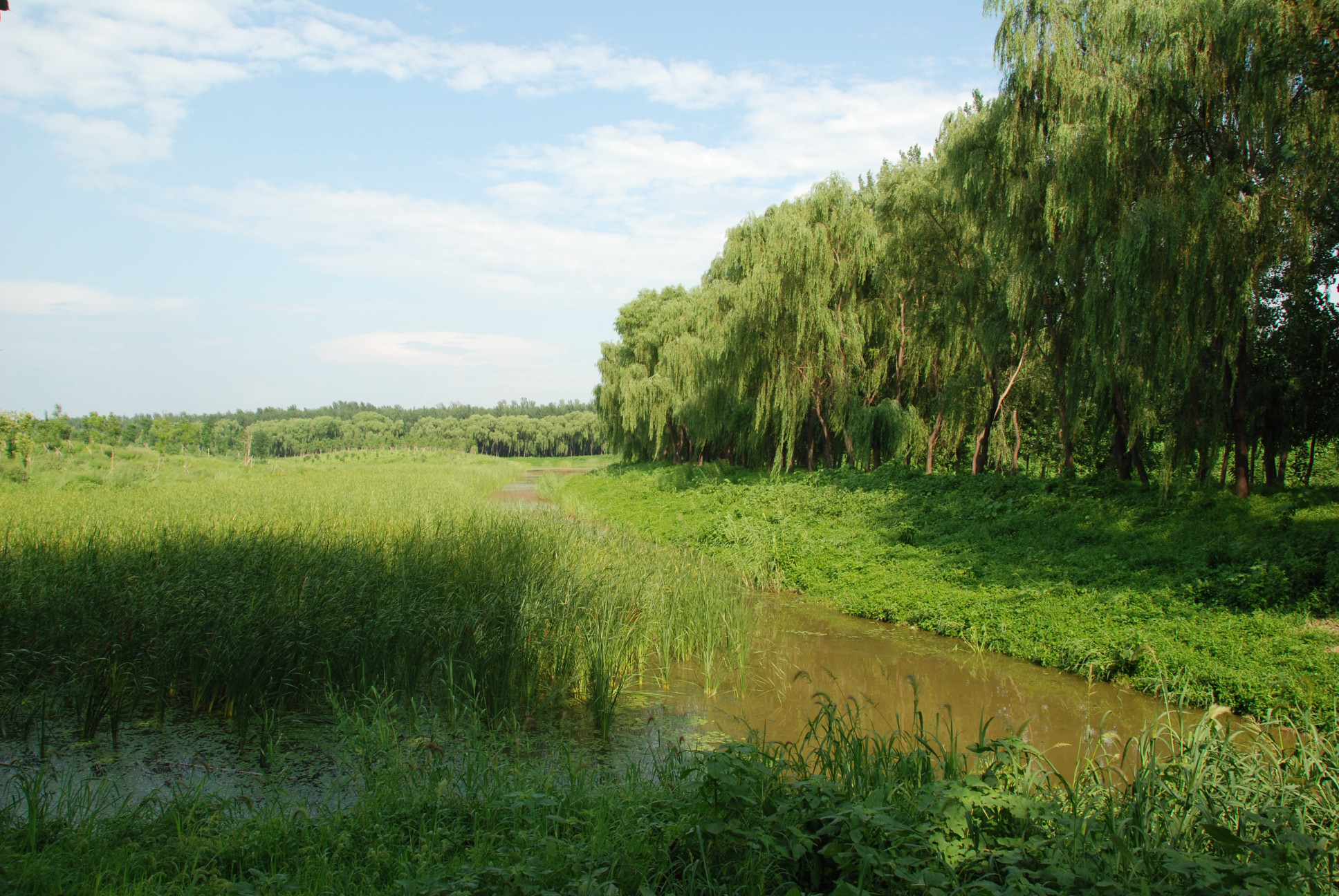
Hanshiqiao Wetland on the southwest of the town, 2009

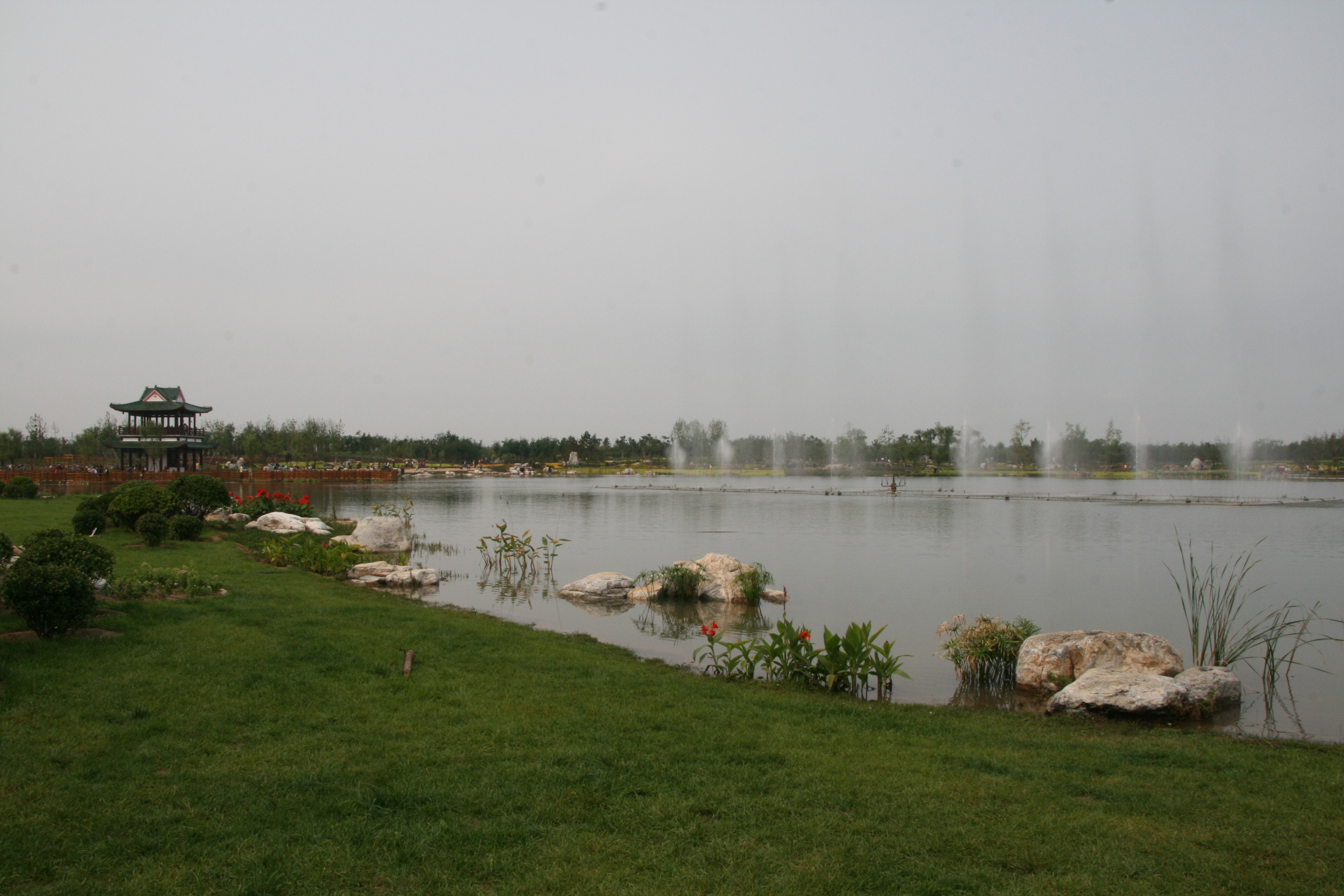
Huanghua Lake north of Hongsi Village, 2009

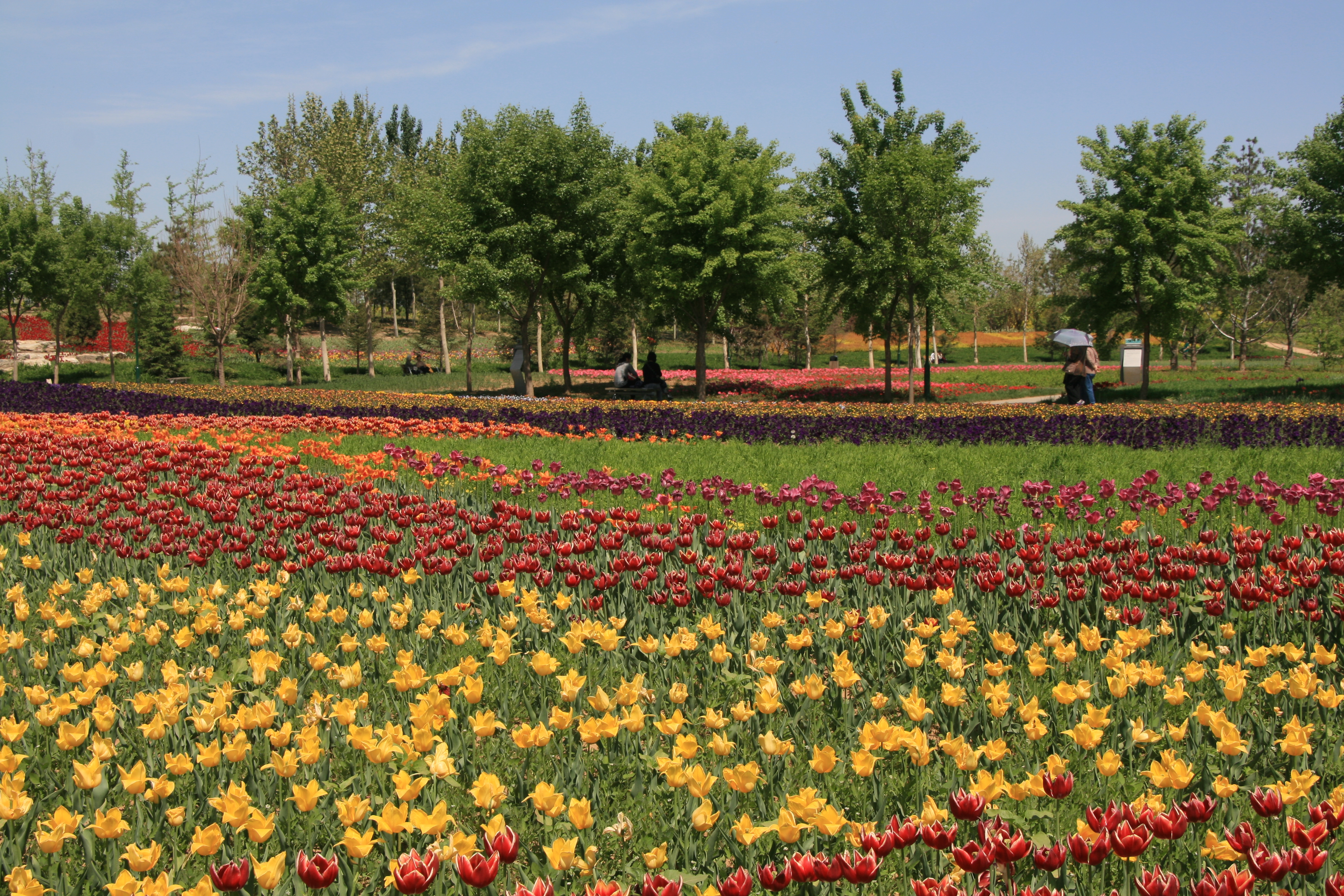
Field of tulips in Beijing International Flower Port

== See also ==
- List of township-level divisions of Beijing
